= List of public hospitals in the United States =

This is a list of public hospitals in the United States.

== Currently operating ==
Alaska

- Bartlett Regional Hospital (Juneau)

Arizona

- Valleywise Health (formerly Maricopa Integrated Health System)
  - Valleywise Health Medical Center (Phoenix)

California

- Alameda Health System
  - Highland Hospital
- Los Angeles County Department of Health Services
  - Los Angeles General Medical Center (Los Angeles)
  - Harbor-UCLA Medical Center
  - Olive View-UCLA Medical Center
- San Francisco Department of Public Health
  - San Francisco General Hospital
- Santa Clara County Health System
  - Santa Clara Valley Medical Center

Colorado

- Aspen Valley Health
- Delta County Memorial Hospital
- Denver Health
- Heart of the Rockies Regional Medical Center
- Kit Carson County Memorial Hospital
- Pagosa Springs Medical Center
- Poudre Valley Hospital
- Prowers Medical Center
- St. Vincent Health (Leadville)
- Southeast Colorado Hospital
- Spanish Peaks Regional Health Center
- Weisbrod Memorial County Hospital
- Wray Community District Hospital

Connecticut

- UConn Health (John Dempsey Hospital)

Florida

- Bay Pines Veterans Administration Hospital (St. Petersberg)
- Jackson Memorial Hospital (operated by Miami-Dade County) (Miami)
- Broward Health (Fort Lauderdale)
- DeSoto Memorial Hospital (Arcadia)
- Hendry Regional Medical Center (Clewiston)
- Lee Health (Fort Myers)
- Sarasota Memorial Hospital (Sarasota)

Georgia

- Grady Memorial Hospital (Atlanta)

Illinois

- John H. Stroger Jr. Hospital of Cook County (Chicago)
- Provident Hospital (Chicago)

Indiana

- Sidney & Lois Eskenazi Hospital (Indianapolis)

Minnesota

- Hennepin County Medical Center

Mississippi

- Greenwood Leflore Hospital - Jointly owned by the City of Greenwood and Leflore County

New Jersey

- University Hospital - Newark

New York

- NYC Health + Hospitals
  - NYC Health + Hospitals/Bellevue
  - NYC Health + Hospitals/Coney Island
  - NYC Health + Hospitals/Elmhurst
  - NYC Health + Hospitals/Harlem
  - NYC Health + Hospitals/Jacobi
  - NYC Health + Hospitals/Kings County
  - NYC Health + Hospitals/Lincoln
  - NYC Health + Hospitals/Metropolitan
  - NYC Health + Hospitals/North Central Bronx
  - NYC Health + Hospitals/Queens
  - NYC Health + Hospitals/Woodhull

North Carolina

- Atrium Health (Mecklenburg County)
  - Carolinas Medical Center (Charlotte)

Oregon

- Harney District Hospital (Burns)
- Lake District Hospital

Tennessee

- West Tennessee Healthcare (Jackson-Madison County General Hospital District)

Texas

- Bexar County Hospital District, doing business as University Health System (Bexar County)
  - University Hospital
- Brooke Army Medical Center
- Harris Health (Harris County)
  - Ben Taub Hospital (Houston)
  - Lyndon B. Johnson General Hospital (Houston)
- JPS Health Network (Tarrant County)
  - John Peter Smith Hospital (Fort Worth)
- MD Anderson Cancer Center (Houston)
- Parkland Health & Hospital System (Dallas County)
  - Parkland Memorial Hospital (Dallas)
- University Medical Center of El Paso (El Paso)

Virginia

- University of Virginia Health System
  - UVA Children's Hospital
- VCU Medical Center

Wisconsin

  - Clement J. Zablocki center for Veterans Affairs and Medical center (west allis) (Milwaukee county)

== Former hospitals ==
- Blockley Almshouse/Philadelphia General Hospital
- Boston City Hospital
- Brackenridge Hospital (Austin, Texas)
- Detroit General Hospital (privatized, now Detroit Receiving Hospital)
- District of Columbia General Hospital
- Greenville General Hospital (of the Greenville Health Authority), owned by the city of Greenville, SC. It continues to own the hospital facility but leases management to Prisma Health, which operates it as Prisma Health Greenville Memorial Hospital.
- Martin Luther King Jr./Drew Medical Center (Los Angeles County, California)
- New Hanover Regional Medical Center (Wilmington, North Carolina) - Formerly operated by New Hanover County. In February 2021 Novant Health, a nonprofit private organization, acquired the hospital. Due to the acquisition it is no longer a public hospital.
- Tampa General Hospital (formerly Tampa Municipal Hospital) - Became a private hospital circa 1997

== See also ==
- Central Health - Hospital district of Travis County, Texas
