= St. Mary-Corwin Medical Center =

- CommonSpirit Health
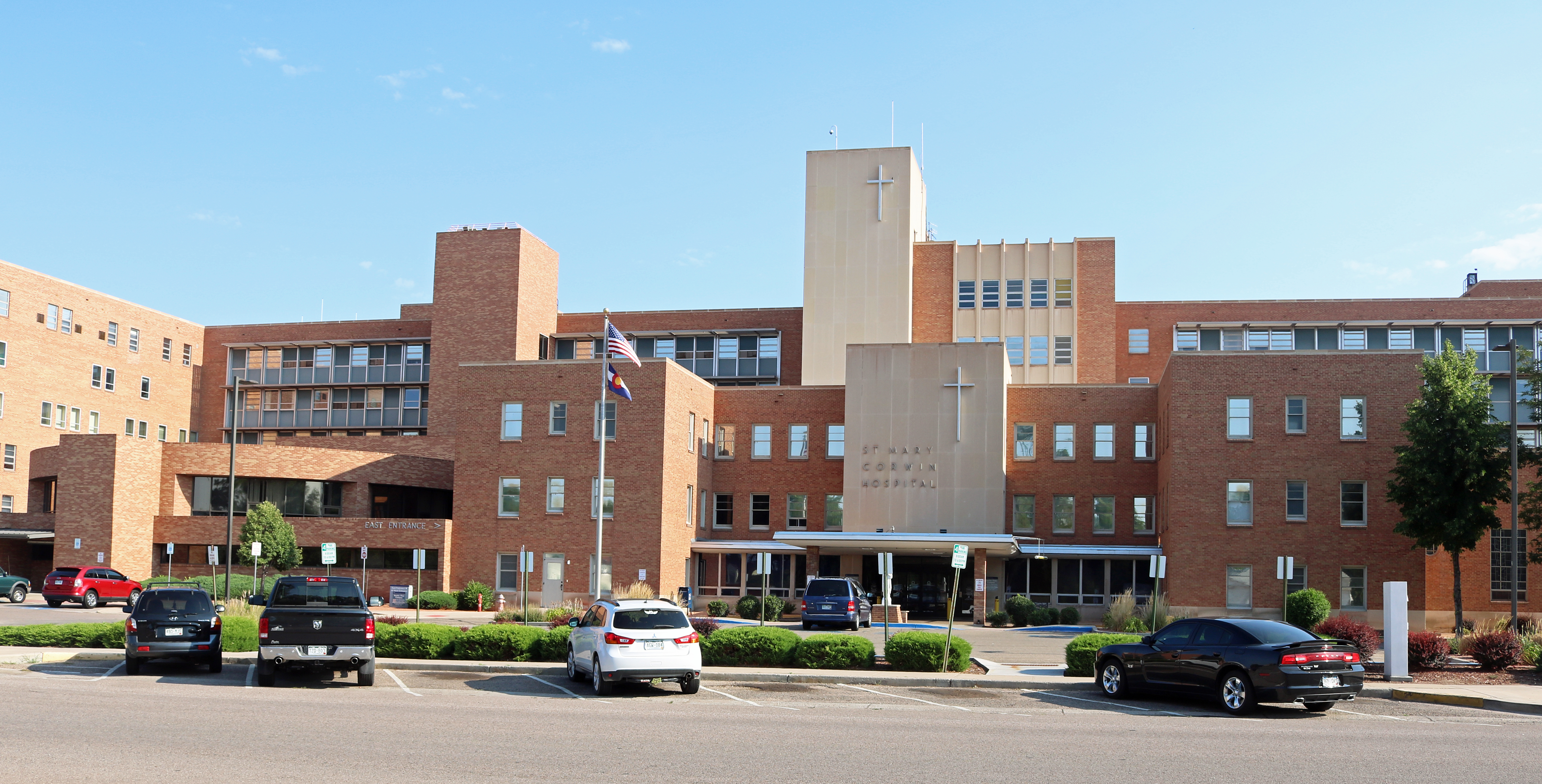
- The hospital's main entrance area

Geography
- Location: 1008 Minnequa Avenue, Pueblo, Colorado, United States
- Coordinates: 38°14′02.0″N 104°37′35.6″W

Organization
- Type: General

Services
- Emergency department: Level III Trauma Center
- Beds: 42

Helipads
- Helipad: Yes

History
- Founded: 1882

Links
- Website: www.centura.org/locations/st-mary-corwin-medical-center
- Lists: Hospitals in Colorado

St. Mary-Corwin Medical Center is a medical facility with a Flight for Life base, cancer and stroke center and residency program located in Pueblo, Colorado. It is a part of the CommonSpirit Health network. It specializes in orthopedics, cancer care, emergency services, robot-assisted surgery, breast care and women's services.

== History ==
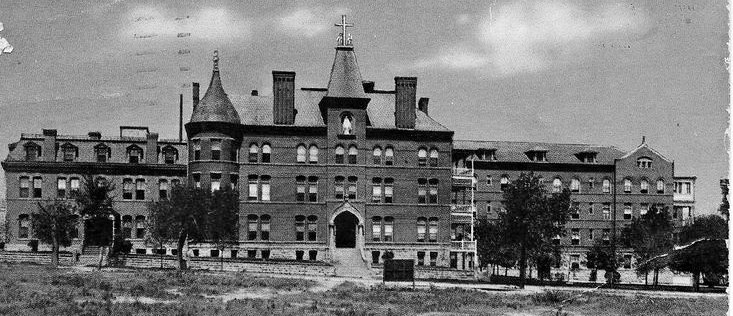
St. Mary's Hospital, Pueblo, Colorado

In 1882, the Sisters of Charity opened St. Mary's Hospital in what had been a two-story boarding house. The hospital eventually outgrew this building and a new, four-story, 90-bed structure was built and used until the mid-1950s.

In 1881 the Colorado Coal and Iron Company (predecessor of the Colorado Fuel & Iron Company- CF&I) hired Dr. Richard Corwin to start a company medical clinic in Pueblo.

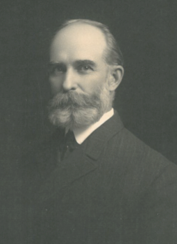
Dr. Richard Corwin

The first building was located on company grounds near the Minnequa Plant in south Pueblo and became known as Minnequa Hospital. In 1882, a typhoid outbreak among the iron workers overwhelmed the small hospital, so a larger 30-bed facility was built. In 1902, a completely new, 200-bed facility was built near Lake Minnequa. Upon the death of Dr. Corwin in 1929, the hospital renamed itself in honor of its founding physician.

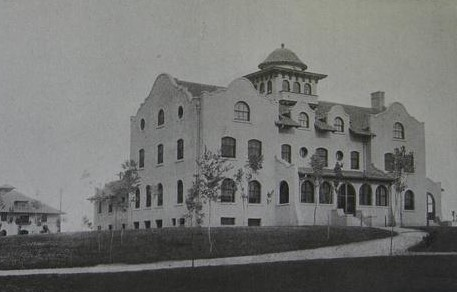
Colorado Fuel & Iron's Minnequa Hospital

By the late 1940s, the CF&I wanted to get out of the healthcare business and St. Mary's was aggressively seeking funds for needed expansion. Based on the Sisters' good reputation, the board of directors voted to transfer ownership of Corwin Hospital to them for $1.

In 1950, Corwin Hospital consisted of three two-story wings and 200-beds. In 1953, the Sisters of Charity decided to consolidate both hospitals. St. Mary's would be razed and Corwin Hospital would be expanded by building over and around the existing structure. The new St. Mary-Corwin Medical Center was dedicated in 1957. With nearly 500 beds and its advanced medical equipment it drew new specialists to the area and was followed by a medical office building, outpatient pharmacy, EEG Lab, cafeteria and dining room. A psychiatric unit opened in 1960 followed by an on-site blood bank in 1961 and the hospital's first intensive care unit in 1962.

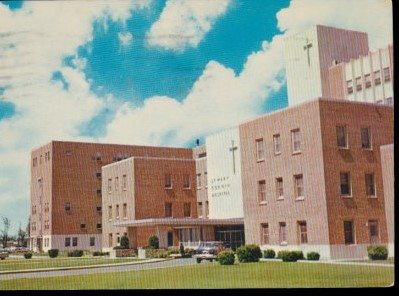
St. Mary-Corwin Medical Center in 1964.

In the 1970s, a helipad was built and Flight For Life service was initiated. The Southern Colorado Family Medicine residency clinic was opened, and a new, circular-designed ICU was added. In the 1980s another wing was added. The 1990s brought about the opening of a new clinic, the St. Mary-Corwin Health Center on Pueblo's northside. In 1995, the Sisters of Charity joined with other Catholic healthcare providers to form Catholic Health Initiatives (CHI). The following year, Colorado CHI hospitals signed a joint operating agreement with the Portercare Adventist Health System to form a new management company, Centura Health.

In 2023, the two healthcare organizations that joined to form Centura disaffiliated and became two separate health networks again, one called CommonSpirit Health (the successor to Catholic Health Initiatives) and one called AdventHealth. As of August 1, 2023, St. Mary-Corwin Medical Center is part of the CommonSpirit Health network.

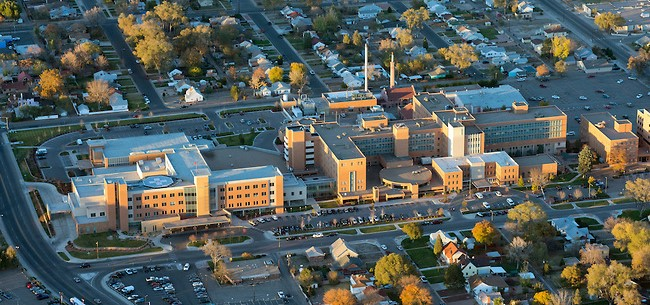
St Mary-Corwin Medical Center today

== Hospital ==
=== Specialties and departments ===
- Breast Center
- Joint Replacement Center- Orthopedics
- Dorcy Cancer Center
- Diagnostic Imaging (X-Ray)
- Emergency Services
- GI/Endoscopy
- Health at Home
- Cardiovascular
- Physician Practices
- Robotic-Assisted Surgery
- Surgical Services
