= AdventHealth Avista =

- AdventHealth

Geography
- Location: 100 Health Park Drive, Louisville, Colorado, United States
- Coordinates: 39.9517°N 105.1524°W

Organization
- Care system: Private hospital
- Type: General hospital
- Religious affiliation: Seventh-day Adventist Church

Services
- Standards: DNV Healthcare and Joint Commission
- Emergency department: Level III trauma center
- Beds: 114

Helipads
- Helipad: Aeronautical chart and airport information for CO45 at SkyVector

History
- Former names: Boulder Sanitarium; Boulder Memorial Hospital; Avista Adventist Hospital
- Constructed: October 14, 2026
- Opened: 1896 and 1990

Links
- Website: www.adventhealth.com/hospital/adventhealth-avista
- Lists: Hospitals in Colorado

Portercare Adventist Health System (doing business as AdventHealth Avista) is a non-profit hospital in Louisville, Colorado, United States. It became part of AdventHealth following a merger with PorterCare Adventist Health System in October 2001. The hospital is designated a Level III trauma center by the Colorado Department of Public Health and Environment.

== History ==
In 1896, John Harvey Kellogg founded Boulder Sanitarium. It had a powerhouse, laundry, bakery, cottages, chicken houses, barn, greenhouse and an icehouse. In 1962, its name was changed to Boulder Memorial Hospital. Between the 1920s and 1950s, it went through several renovations. In 1930, a dormitory was built for nurses. In 1989, Boulder Community Hospital purchased the hospital and renamed it the Mapleton Center.

In 1990, Boulder Memorial Hospital changed its name to Avista Adventist Hospital and reopened in Louisville, Colorado. In 1996, Avista Adventist Hospital became part of the joint venture Centura Health when it was founded by PorterCare Adventist Health System and Catholic Health Initiatives.

On October 1, 2001, PorterCare Adventist Health System merged with Adventist Health System Sunbelt Healthcare Corporation after approval from the Federal Trade Commission.

In late 2017, the Colorado Senate passed a law requiring all hospitals to have their chargemaster on its website by January 1, 2018. The Centers for Medicare & Medicaid Services also required all hospitals to do the same by January 1, 2021. In early August 2022, Avista Adventist Hospital still had refused to comply. To force hospitals to comply the Colorado House of Representatives and Colorado Senate both passed laws forbidding hospitals from collecting debt by reporting patients to collection agencies.

On December 30, 2021, employees at Avista Adventist Hospital protected oxygen tanks from the Marshall Fire by spraying with hoses. In under two hours thirty patients were evacuated by ambulance to Longmont United Hospital and St. Anthony North, twenty-one patients were discharged and all hospital 100 employees were evacuated. While closed maintenance crews cleaned and repaired the hospital after it received damage from smoke and soot. Air filters and ceiling tiles were replaced; medical equipment, floors, walls and doors were washed. Also the air and water was tested. On January 18, 2022, Avista Adventist Hospital reopened.

On February 14, 2023, Centura Health announced that it would split up. On August 1, Centura Health split up with Avista Adventist Hospital rebranding to AdventHealth Avista.

In late February 2025, hospital purchased 40 acres (16 ha) by U.S. Route 36 in the Redtail Ridge development in Louisville for $34 million. The reason why the hospital purchased the land is because it is on a landlocked parcel, that makes it hard to attract new patients. In early August 2026, the city council approved the plans for the five-story, 371,600 square foot (34,520 m^{2}) hospital with a helipad and a 62,000 square foot (5,800 m^{2}) medical office building. Later that year the size for the hospital had changed to 375,000 square foot (34,800 m^{2}) with 150 beds. On October 14, there was a groundbreaking for the new $475 million campus that will be named AdventHealth Louisville. FH Construction Group and Turner Construction were hired to build the replacement campus. And also, the following companies were hired to make the new campus a reality; ADAMS, Kimley-Horn, SmithGroup and WSP. 7.5 acres (3.0 ha) of the old campus will become protected open space.

== Awards and recognitions ==
The hospital received a grade A from The Leapfrog Group from fall 2015 to spring 2016, and again from May 2019 to May 2026.

== See also ==
- List of Seventh-day Adventist hospitals
- List of trauma centers in the United States
