= Spanish Peaks Regional Health Center =

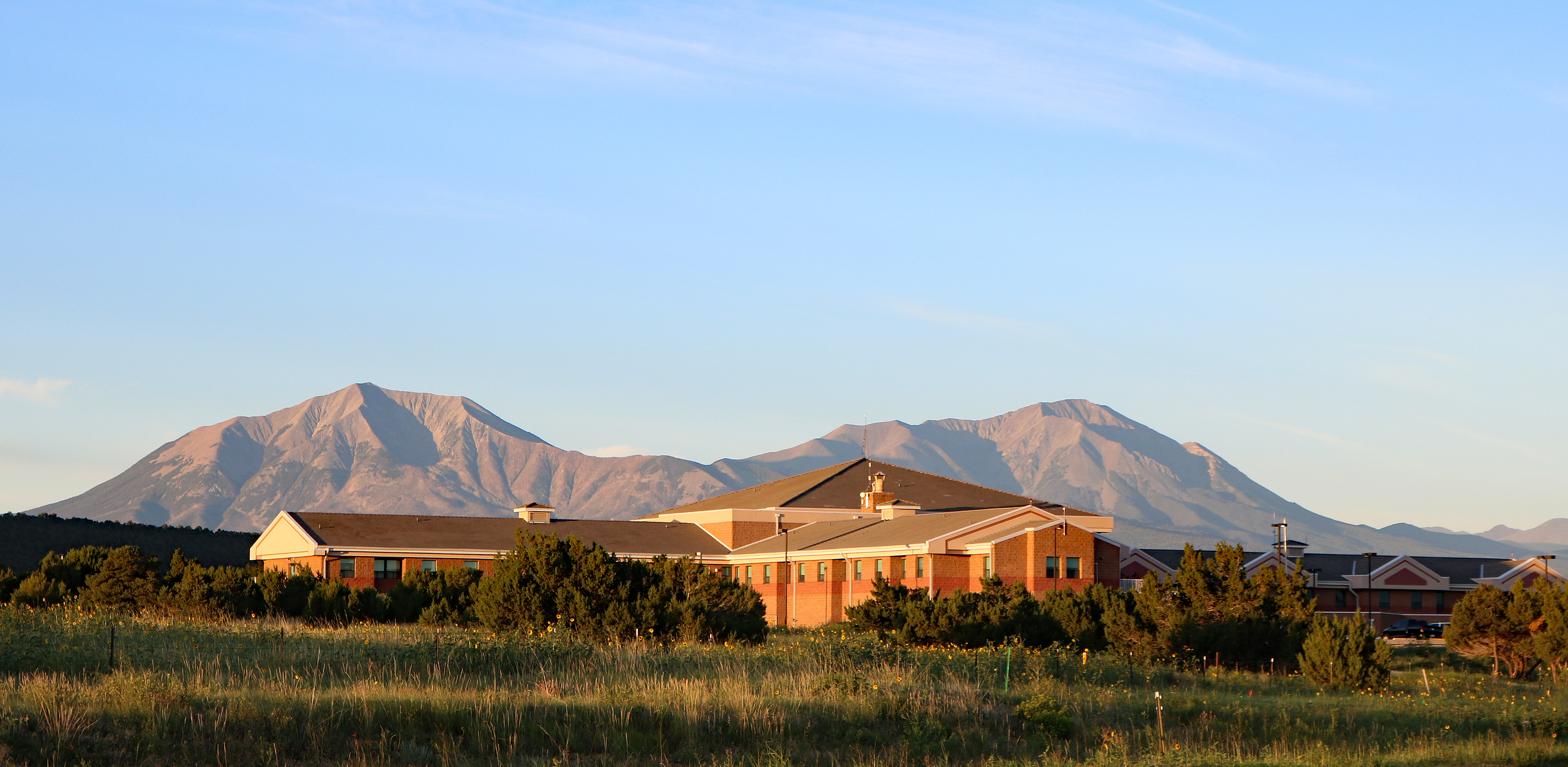
- The hospital building and the Spanish Peaks.

- The hospital's location in Colorado.

Geography
- Location: Near Walsenburg, Huerfano County, Colorado, United States
- Coordinates: 37°36′02″N 104°49′52″W

Organization
- Care system: Private, regional hospital
- Type: District general
- Affiliated university: None

Services
- Emergency department: Level IV trauma center
- Beds: 20

Helipads
- Helipad: Yes

History
- Founded: 1993

Links
- Website: www.sprhc.org
- Lists: Hospitals in Colorado

The Spanish Peaks Regional Health Center is a public district-owned regional hospital near Walsenburg, Colorado. Founded in 1993, the medical center currently has 20 licensed beds.

The Huerfano County Hospital District owns and operates the health center but only operates the state-owned 120-bed Spanish Peaks Veterans Community Living Center, a nursing home, on the same property.

The hospital is a Level IV trauma center and a critical access hospital. It is located directly across the highway from Lathrop State Park.
