= Vail Health Hospital =

- Vail Health
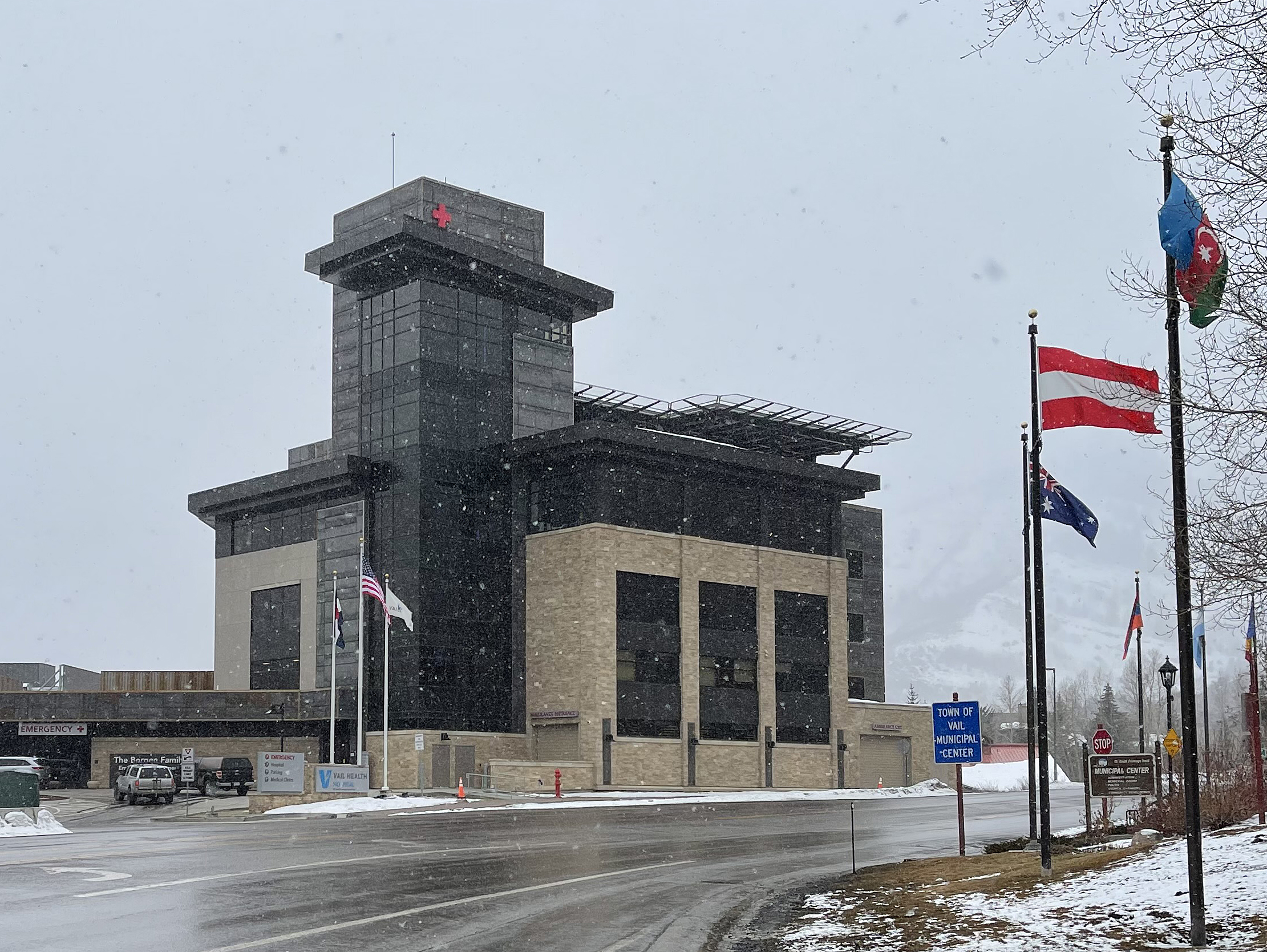
- The hospital's east wing, built in 2020

- The hospital's location in Colorado.

Geography
- Location: 180 South Frontage Road West; Vail, Colorado 81657, Eagle County, Colorado, United States
- Coordinates: 39°38′36″N 106°22′57″W

Organization
- Type: Regional hospital

Services
- Emergency department: Level III trauma center
- Beds: 56

Helipads
- Helipad: Yes

History
- Founded: 1965

Links
- Website: vailhealth.org
- Lists: Hospitals in Colorado

Vail Health Hospital is a regional hospital in Vail, Colorado, in Eagle County. Originally established as a small clinic in 1965, the hospital now has 56 beds. The hospital is a Level III trauma center.

== History ==
Vail Health Hospital began as Vail Clinic in 1965 and was staffed by just one doctor, Dr. Tom Steinberg. The first hospital building was constructed in 1967, and it was expanded in 1979. In 1980, the clinic changed its name to Vail Valley Medical Center. By this year, it had 25 full-time doctors on its staff. Major expansions took place in 1987, 1989, and 2001, when Vail Health's Shaw Regional Cancer Center opened. In 2017, Vail Valley Medical Center changed its name to Vail Health, its current name.

=== 2020 expansion ===
In December 2020, the hospital opened a new, $194 million wing, the East Wing. The 350,000-square-foot (33,000-square-meter) wing brings the hospital campus's total floor space to 520,000 square feet (48,000 square meters). The new wing features a helipad on the roof, with an elevator that brings patients directly to the emergency department.

== Vail Health ==
The umbrella organization behind Vail Health Hospital is Vail Health, a nonprofit 501(c)(3) organization governed by a board of directors. Vail Health also operates satellite clinics in Eagle and Summit counties. The clinics are located in Avon, Beaver Creek, Breckenridge, Dillon, Eagle, Edwards, Frisco, Gypsum, Leadville, and Silverthorne.
