= Mercy Regional Medical Center =

- CommonSpirit Health
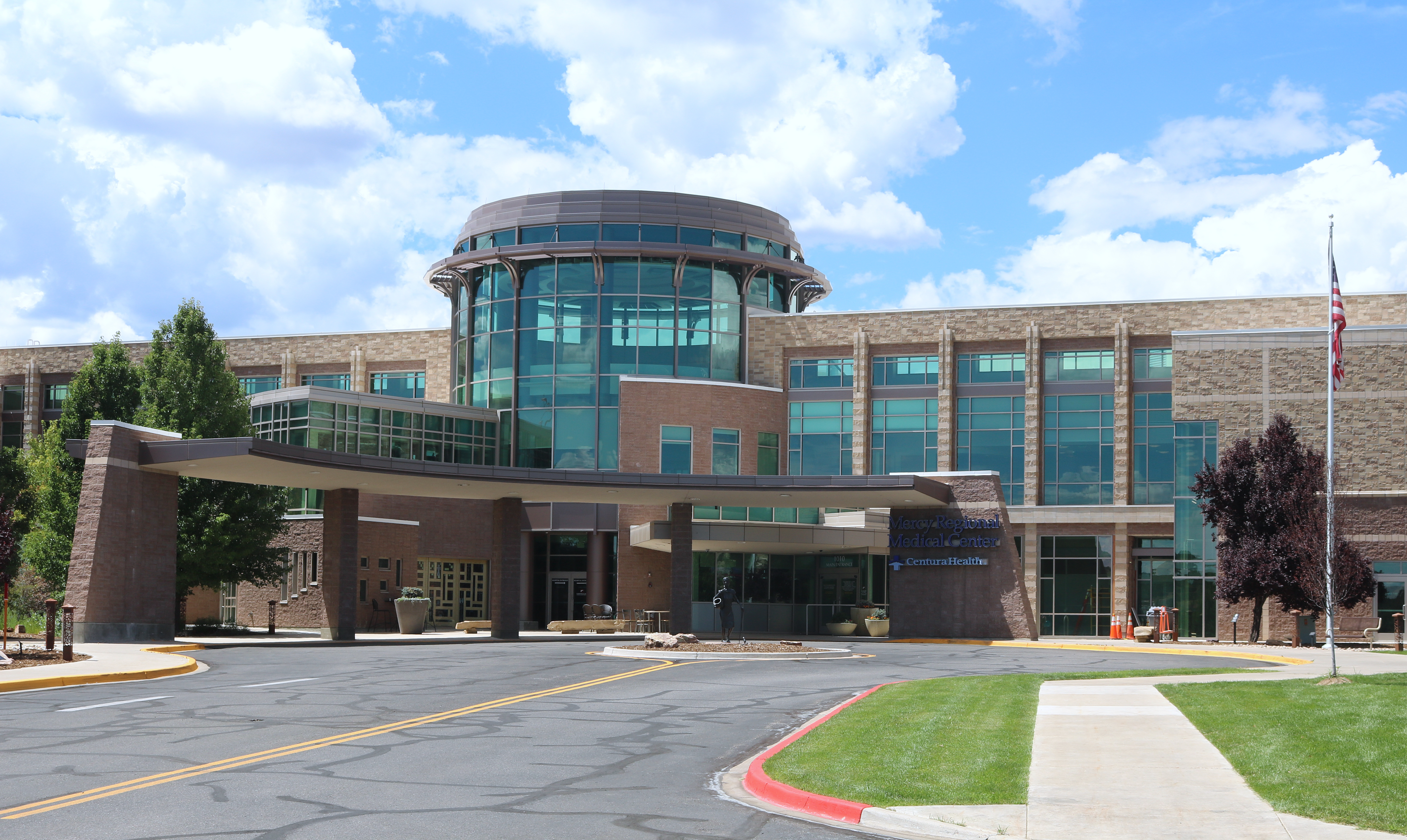
- The hospital's main entrance area

- The hospital's location in Colorado.

Geography
- Location: 1010 Three Springs Blvd. Durango, Colorado 81301, La Plata County, Colorado, United States
- Coordinates: 37°14′8.95″N 107°49′33.98″W

Organization
- Type: Regional hospital

Services
- Emergency department: Level III trauma center
- Beds: 82

Helipads
- Helipad: Yes

History
- Founded: 1882

Links
- Website: www.mountain.commonspirit.org/location/mercy-hospital
- Lists: Hospitals in Colorado

Mercy Regional Medical Center is a general hospital in Durango, Colorado, in La Plata County. Originally established in 1882, the hospital has 82 beds. The hospital's current campus opened in June 2006. It is located east of downtown Durango in the city's Grandview neighborhood.

The hospital is a Level III trauma center.

On August 1, 2023, Centura Health split back into two healthcare organizations, AdventHealth and CommonSpirit Health. At that time, Mercy Hospital became part of CommonSpirit Health.
