= Rio Grande Hospital =

- Valley Citizens' Foundation for Healthcare, Inc.
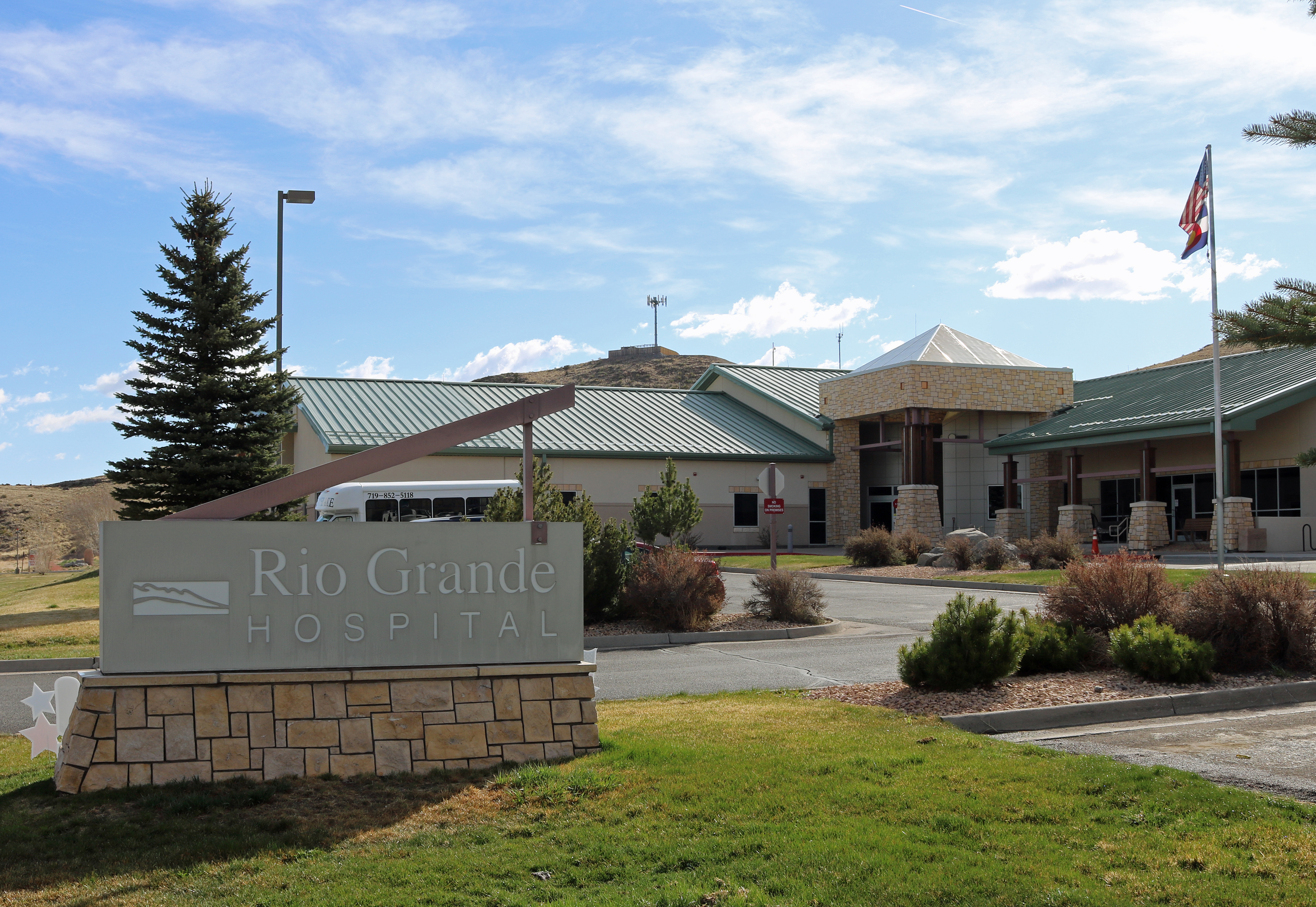
- The hospital's main building in Del Norte

- The hospital's location in Colorado.

Geography
- Location: 310 County Road 14; Del Norte, Colorado 81501, Rio Grande County, Colorado, United States
- Coordinates: 37°40′28″N 106°21′50″W

Organization
- Type: General

Services
- Emergency department: Level IV trauma center
- Beds: 17

History
- Founded: 1996

Links
- Website: riograndehospital.org
- Lists: Hospitals in Colorado

Rio Grande Hospital is a critical access hospital in Del Norte, Colorado, in Rio Grande County. The hospital has 17 beds. In addition to the main hospital buildings in Del Norte, the hospital also operates clinics in Creede, South Fork, and Monte Vista.

The hospital is a Level IV trauma center.

== History ==
The hospital was established in 1996 by the Valley Citizens’ Foundation for Healthcare, Inc., a community non-profit organization, succeeding an earlier hospital organization that closed in 1993.

70% of the patients served at Rio Grande Hospital are on Medicare and Medicaid.

== Recognition ==
In 2024, the hospital earned a Performance Leadership award for excellence in quality and patient perspective.
