= St. Anthony Hospital (Gig Harbor, Washington) =

Hospital in Gig Harbor, Washington, US

Coordinates: 47°21′50″N 122°36′49″W

St. Anthony Hospital in Gig Harbor, Washington is operated by CommonSpirit Health under the Virginia Mason Franciscan Health brand. It opened in March 2009.

== See also ==
- List of hospitals in Washington (state)
