= Heart of the Rockies =

Heart of the Rockies may refer to:

- Heart of the Rockies (1937 film), a 1937 film
- Heart of the Rockies (1951 film), a 1951 film
- Heart of the Rockies Regional Medical Center, a hospital in Salida, Colorado
