= Saint Thomas More Hospital =

- CommonSpirit Health
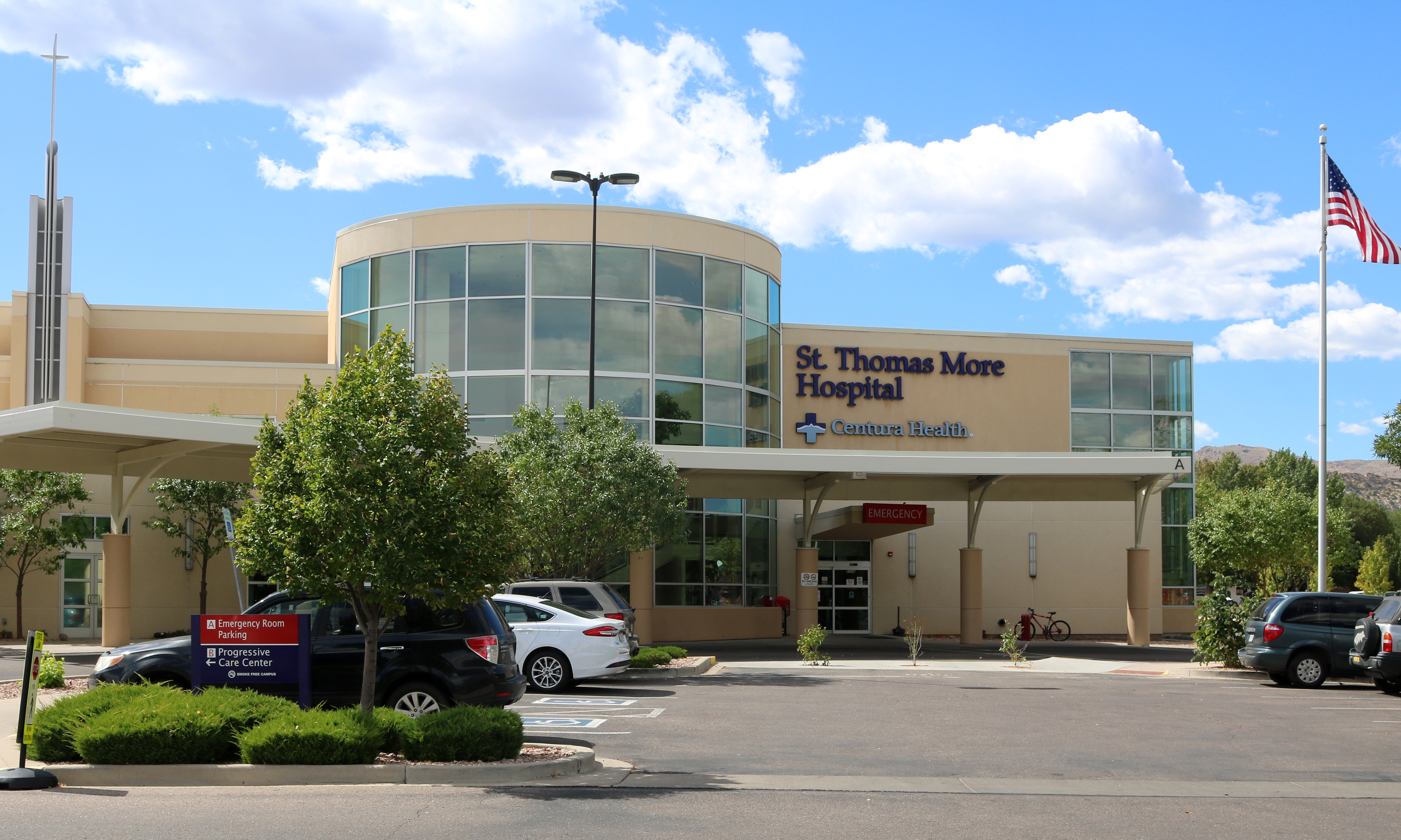
- The hospital in 2018

Geography
- Location: Cañon City, Fremont County, Colorado, United States
- Coordinates: 38°27′19″N 105°13′50″W

Organization
- Type: General

Links
- Website: www.stmhospital.org/STM/Home
- Lists: Hospitals in Colorado

Saint Thomas More Hospital, commonly styled as St. Thomas More Hospital, is the main hospital for Cañon City and the surrounding area in Fremont County, Colorado. It is owned by CommonSpirit Health.

== History ==
Saint Thomas More Hospital has evolved from a small local hospital in the downtown area to a thriving medical center in northern Cañon City. The hospital was started in 1938 and celebrated its 75th anniversary on November 16, 2013.

In 2023, the two healthcare organizations that joined to form Centura in 1995 disaffiliated and became two separate health networks again, one called CommonSpirit Health and one called AdventHealth. As of August 1, 2023, Saint Thomas More Hospital is part of the CommonSpriit Health network.

== Services ==
Saint Thomas More Hospital is a full-service hospital. The facility features a birth center, emergency services, and an intensive care unit.
