= List of hospitals in Colorado =

Coordinates: 38.9972°N 105.5478°W

The location of the state of Colorado in the United States

This is a list of hospitals in the U.S. state of Colorado. The American Hospital Directory lists 60 hospitals in Colorado in 2024.

== Hospitals ==
Hospital	County	City	Bed count	Trauma center	Founded	Notes
AdventHealth Avista	Boulder	Louisville	114	Level III	1990	Formerly Avista Adventist Hospital
AdventHealth Castle Rock	Douglas	Castle Rock	60	Level III	2011	Formerly Castle Rock Adventist Hospital
AdventHealth Littleton	Arapahoe	Littleton	231	Level II	1989	Formerly Littleton Adventist Hospital
AdventHealth Parker	Douglas	Parker	170	Level II	2004	Formerly Parker Adventist Hospital
AdventHealth Porter	Denver	Denver	368	Level III	1930	Formerly Porter Adventist Hospital
Animas Surgical Hospital	La Plata	Durango	12	Level IV	2004	
Arkansas Valley Regional Medical Center	Otero	La Junta	78	Level IV	1971	
Aspen Valley Health	Pitkin	Aspen	25	Level III	1891	
Banner Fort Collins Medical Center	Larimer	Fort Collins	23	None	2015	
Cedar Springs Behavioral Hospital	El Paso	Colorado Springs	76	None	1924	Psychiatric
Centennial Peaks Hospital	Boulder	Louisville	72	None		Psychiatric
Children's Hospital Colorado	Adams	Aurora	414	Level I Pediatric	1908	
Children's Hospital Colorado, Colorado Springs	El Paso	Colorado Springs	115	Level I Pediatric	2019	
Children's Hospital Colorado North Campus	Boulder	Broomfield	Unknown	Unknown	Unknown	
Children's Hospital Colorado South Campus	Douglas	Highlands Ranch	16	None	2013	
Clear View Behavioral Health (changed to Johnstown Behavioral Health)	Larimer	Johnstown	92	None		Psychiatric; Permanently closed as of March 31, 2025
Colorado Acute Long Term Hospital	Denver	Denver	63	None		Long term
Colorado Mental Health Institute at Fort Logan	Denver	Denver	94	None	1961	Psychiatric
Colorado Mental Health Institute at Pueblo	Pueblo	Pueblo	459	None	1879	Psychiatric
Community Hospital	Mesa	Grand Junction	78	Level III	1946	
Conejos County Hospital	Conejos	La Jara	17	Level IV	1963	
Craig Hospital	Arapahoe	Englewood	93	None	1907	Long term
Delta County Memorial Hospital	Delta	Delta	49	Level IV	1975	
Denver Health Medical Center	Denver	Denver	525	Level I, Level II Pediatric	1860	
Denver Springs	Douglas	Unincorporated Douglas County	96	None	2017	Psychiatric
East Morgan County Hospital	Morgan	Brush	25	Level IV	1967	
Eating Recovery Center a Behavioral Hospital	Denver	Denver	36	None		Psychiatric
Eating Recovery Center a Behavioral Hospital for Children and Adolescents	Denver	Denver	24	None		Psychiatric
Eating Recovery Center Behavioral Health	Denver	Denver	29	None		Psychiatric
Estes Park Medical Center	Larimer	Estes Park	23	Level IV		
Evans Army Community Hospital	El Paso	Fort Carson	92	None	1942	
Family Health West Hospital	Mesa	Fruita	25	Level IV	1946	
Foothills Hospital	Boulder	Boulder	160	Level II	1922	
Good Samaritan Medical Center	Boulder	Lafayette	234	Level II	2004	
Grand River Health	Garfield	Rifle	25	Level IV		
Gunnison Valley Health	Gunnison	Gunnison	24	Level IV	1938	
Haxtun Hospital District	Phillips	Haxtun	25	Level IV	1949	
HealthSouth Rehabilitation Hospital of Colorado Springs	El Paso	Colorado Springs	64	None		Rehabilitation
HealthSouth Rehabilitation Hospital of Littleton	Arapahoe	Littleton	40	None		Rehabilitation
Heart of the Rockies Regional Medical Center	Chaffee	Salida	25	Level IV	1885	
Highlands Behavioral Health System	Douglas	Highlands Ranch	86	None		Psychiatric
Intermountain Health Lutheran Hospital	Jefferson	Wheat Ridge	226	Level II	1905	
Keefe Memorial Hospital	Cheyenne	Cheyenne Wells	25	Level IV	1931	
Kindred Hospital - Denver	Denver	Denver	68	None		Long term
Kindred Hospital - Denver South	Denver	Denver	28	None		Long term
Kindred Hospital Aurora	Arapahoe	Aurora	37	None		Long term
Kit Carson County Memorial Hospital	Kit Carson	Burlington	19	Level IV		
Lincoln Community Hospital	Lincoln	Hugo	15	Level IV	1959	
Longmont United Hospital	Boulder	Longmont	186	Level III	1959	
Longs Peak Hospital	Boulder	Longmont	51	Level III	2017	
McKee Medical Center	Larimer	Loveland	115	Level III	1976	E.R Closed in 2025, is only a Surgery Center and Cancer Center now
The Medical Center of Aurora	Arapahoe	Aurora	346	Level II	1974	
Medical Center of the Rockies	Larimer	Loveland	193	Level I	2007	
Melissa Memorial Hospital	Phillips	Holyoke	15	Level IV	1918	
The Memorial Hospital	Moffat	Craig	25	Level IV		
Memorial Hospital Central	El Paso	Colorado Springs	413	Level I	1904	
Memorial Hospital North	El Paso	Colorado Springs	110	Level III	2007	
Mercy Regional Medical Center	La Plata	Durango	82	Level III	1882	
Middle Park Medical Center	Grand	Kremmling	23	Level IV	1933	
Middle Park Medical Center - Granby	Grand	Granby	2	Level IV	2012	
Montrose Regional Health	Montrose	Montrose	75	Level III	1950	
Mt. San Rafael Hospital	Las Animas	Trinidad	25	Level IV	1889	
National Jewish Health	Denver	Denver	46	None	1899	
North Colorado Medical Center	Weld	Greeley	378	Level II	1906	
North Suburban Medical Center	Adams	Thornton	157	Level II	1975	
Northern Colorado Long Term Acute Hospital	Larimer	Johnstown	20	None		Long term
Northern Colorado Rehabilitation Hospital	Larimer	Johnstown	40	None		Rehabilitation
OrthoColorado Hospital at St. Anthony Medical Campus	Jefferson	Lakewood	48	None	2010	
Pagosa Springs Medical Center	Archuleta	Pagosa Springs	11	Level IV	2008	
Parkview Pueblo West Hospital	Pueblo	Pueblo West	30		2022	
Peak View Behavioral Health	El Paso	Colorado Springs	112	None		Psychiatric
Penrose Hospital	El Paso	Colorado Springs	364	Level II	1890	
Pikes Peak Regional Hospital	Teller	Woodland	15	Level IV	2007	
Pioneers Medical Center	Rio Blanco	Meeker	15	Level IV	1950	
Platte Valley Medical Center	Adams	Brighton	98	Level III	1960	
Poudre Valley Hospital	Larimer	Fort Collins	226	Level III	1925	
Presbyterian/St. Luke's Medical Center/Rocky Mountain Hospital for Children	Denver	Denver	680	Level IV	1881	
Prowers Medical Center	Prowers	Lamar	25	None	1928	
Rangely District Hospital	Rio Blanco	Rangely	25	Level IV		
Rio Grande Hospital	Rio Grande	Del Norte	17	Level IV	1996	
Rose Medical Center	Denver	Denver	422	Level IV	1945	
St. Anthony Hospital	Jefferson	Lakewood	237	Level I	1892	
St. Anthony North Health Campus	Adams	Westminster	92	Level III	1971	
St. Anthony Summit Medical Center	Summit	Frisco	35	Level III	1970	
St. Elizabeth Hospital (Fort Morgan, Colorado)	Morgan	Fort Morgan	50	Level III	1952	
St. Francis Hospital	El Paso	Colorado Springs	158	Level III	2008	
St. Francis Hospital – Interquest	El Paso	Colorado Springs	64	None	2023	
Saint Joseph Hospital	Denver	Denver	369	Level III	1883	
St. Mary-Corwin Medical Center	Pueblo	Pueblo	42	Level III	1882	
St. Mary's Medical Center	Mesa	Grand Junction	310	Level II	1896	
St. Thomas More Hospital	Fremont	Cañon City	55	Level IV	1938	
St. Vincent General Hospital District	Lake	Leadville	25	None	1879	
San Luis Valley Regional Medical Center	Alamosa	Alamosa	49	Level III		
SCL Health Community Hospital - Northglenn	Adams	Northglenn	8	None		
SCL Health Community Hospital - Southwest	Jefferson	Littleton	8	None		
SCL Health Community Hospital - Westminster	Jefferson	Westminster	8	None		
Sedgwick County Memorial Hospital	Sedgwick	Julesburg	15	Level IV	1950	
Sky Ridge Medical Center	Douglas	Lone Tree	284	Level II	2003	
Southeast Colorado Hospital	Baca	Springfield	23	None	1969	
Southwest Memorial Hospital	Montezuma	Cortez	25	Level IV		
Spalding Rehabilitation Hospital	Arapahoe	Aurora	78	None	1965	Rehabilitation
Spanish Peaks Regional Health Center	Huerfano	Walsenberg	20	Level IV		
Sterling Regional MedCenter	Logan	Sterling	25	Level III	1921	
Swedish Medical Center	Arapahoe	Englewood	368	Level I	1905	
Telluride Regional Medical Center	San Miguel	Telluride	0	Level V		
UCHealth Broomfield Hospital	Broomfield	Broomfield	40	None	2016	
UCHealth Grandview Hospital	El Paso	Colorado Springs	22	None		
UCHealth Highlands Ranch Hospital	Douglas	Highlands Ranch	93	None	2019	
UCHealth Greeley Hospital	Weld	Greeley	53	None	2019	
UCHealth Parkview Medical Center	Pueblo	Pueblo	266	Level III	1923	
University of Colorado Hospital	Adams	Aurora	678	Level I	1921	
Vail Health Hospital	Eagle	Vail	56	Level III	1965	
Valley View Hospital	Garfield	Glenwood Springs	78	Level III	1955	
Vibra Long Term Acute Care Hospital	Adams	Thornton	54	None		Long term, part of Vibra Healthcare
Weisbrod Memorial County Hospital	Kiowa	Eads	25	None		
West Springs Hospital	Mesa	Grand Junction	44	None	2005	Psychiatric
Wray Community District Hospital	Yuma	Wray	15	Level IV	1995	
Yampa Valley Medical Center	Routt	Steamboat Springs	39	Level IV	1946	
Yuma District Hospital	Yuma	Yuma	15	Level IV		

== Counties without hospitals ==
As of September 22, 2026, the following counties do not have a currently operating hospital. Bent, Clear Creek, Costilla, Crowley, Custer, Dolores, Elbert, Gilpin,Hinsdale, Jackson, Mineral, Ouray, Park, Saguache, San Juan or Washington counties.

== Former hospitals ==
Hospital	County	City	Bed count	Trauma center	Founded	Closed	Notes
Cragmor Sanatorium	El Paso County	Colorado Springs			1905	1960s	
Mesa Vista Sanitorium	Boulder	Boulder			1919	1960s Notes	
Fort Lyon Veterans Administration Medical Center	Bent County	Fort Lyon			1860	2001	It originated as a hospital on base, transitioned into the Navy, which became a tuberculosis sanatorium then shifted to the VA until the closure in 2001. It was transformed into a minimum security prison.
Bent County Hospital	Bent County	Las Animas			1929	1997	It originated as a hospital for civilians as the nearby hospital was for military personnel only. In 1997 the facility was transitioned into a nursing facility due to a lack of demand, high cost, and competition with a hospital in a neighboring county.
St. Joseph Minors Hospital	Ouray County	City of Ouray			1887	1964	Closed when the population declined after the mines closed and easier travel to larger cities.
San Juan County Hospital/Miner’s Union Hospital	San Juan County	Silverton			1908	1974	It transitioned into a clinic and the counties public health office. Although no longer officially a hospital excepting emergencies, they are known for helping with emergencies and having outpatient care.
Washington County Public Hospital	Washington County	Akron			1912	1944	Closeed due to rising cost and lower population.
