= Arkansas Valley Regional Medical Center =

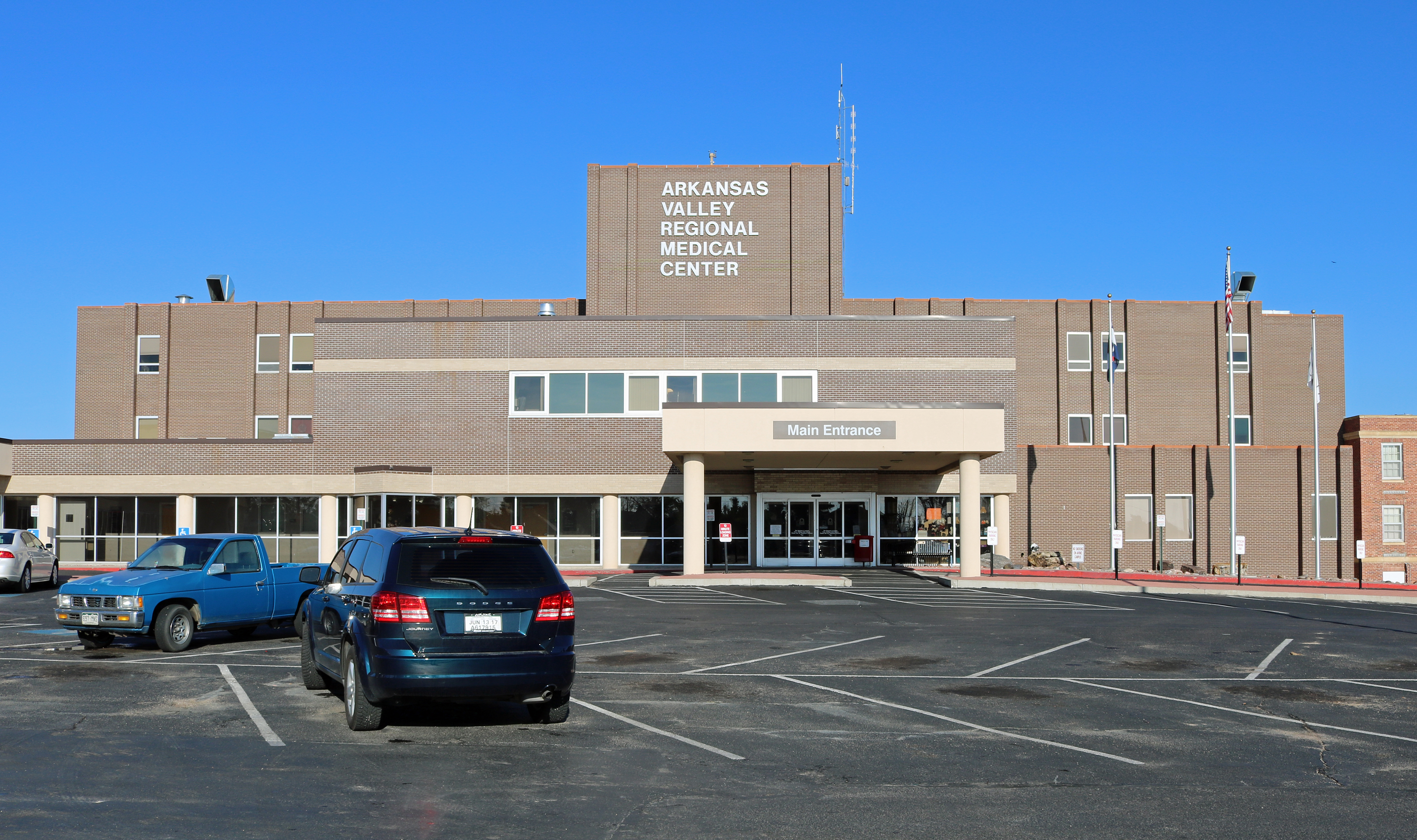

- The hospital's location in Colorado. Arkansas Valley Regional Medical Center (the United States)

Geography
- Location: La Junta, Otero County, Colorado, United States
- Coordinates: 37°58′41″N 103°32′57″W

Organization
- Care system: Private non-profit, regional hospital
- Type: Community
- Affiliated university: None

Services
- Emergency department: Level IV trauma center
- Beds: 25

Helipads
- Helipad: Yes

History
- Founded: 1971

Links
- Website: www.avrmc.org
- Lists: Hospitals in Colorado

The Arkansas Valley Regional Medical Center is a regional hospital in La Junta, Colorado, United States. The present hospital building was completed in 1971, replacing earlier hospital buildings and sanitariums that had existed since the early 20th century.

The medical center currently has 25 licensed beds.

The hospital is a Level IV trauma center.
