= Southeast Colorado Hospital =

- Southeast Colorado Hospital District
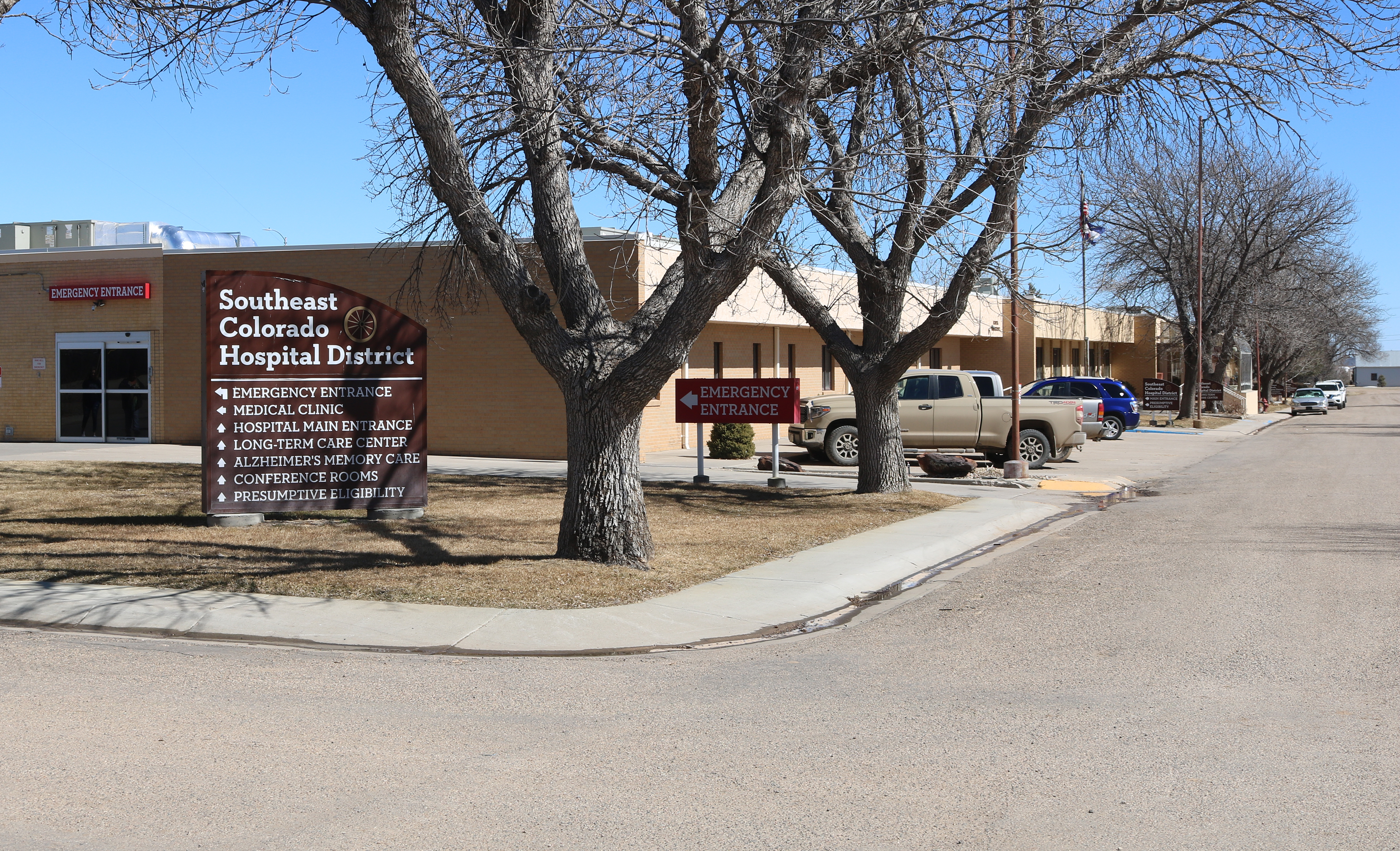
- The hospital campus in Springfield

- The hospital's location in Colorado.

Geography
- Location: Springfield, Baca County, Colorado, United States
- Coordinates: 37°24′16″N 102°36′47″W

Organization
- Care system: Public
- Type: Special district subtype Health Service District
- Affiliated university: None

Services
- Emergency department: Level IV trauma center
- Beds: 23

Helipads
- Helipad: Yes

History
- Founded: 1966

Links
- Website: www.sechosp.org
- Lists: Hospitals in Colorado

Southeast Colorado Hospital is a regional hospital in Springfield, Colorado, in Baca County. Established in 1966 and first opened in 1969, the hospital has 23 beds. The hospital is publicly owned and operated by the Health Service District dba Southeast Colorado Hospital District.

The hospital is a Level IV trauma center. The hospital also operates a 40-bed long-term care center, a home health agency and hospice, a 16-bed Alzheimer's care unit, and an outpatient medical clinic.
