= Montrose Regional Health =

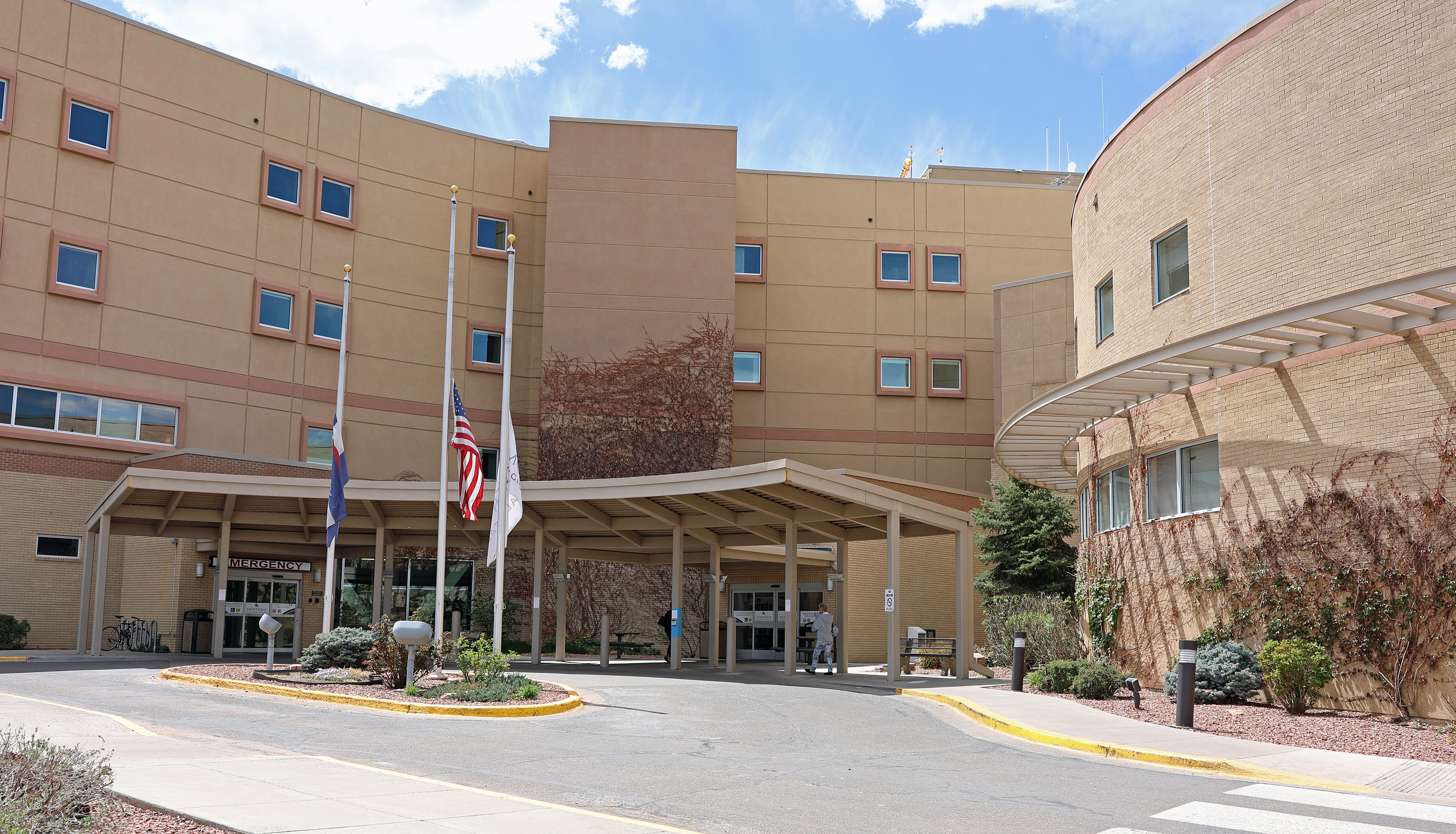
- The hospital's main entrance area

- The hospital's location in Colorado.

Geography
- Location: 800 South 3rd Street; Montrose, Colorado, Montrose County, Colorado, US
- Coordinates: 38°28′49.64″N 107°52′6.65″W

Organisation
- Care system: Private
- Type: Acute hospital

Services
- Emergency department: III
- Beds: 75

History
- Former name: Montrose Memorial Hospital
- Founded: 1950

Links
- Website: montrosehealth.com

Montrose Regional Health is a regional, acute hospital in Montrose, Colorado, in Montrose County. The hospital is a level III trauma center. It has 75 beds. The hospital serves patients in Montrose, San Miguel, Ouray, Gunnison, Delta, Hinsdale and San Juan counties in Colorado.

== History ==
The hospital was first opened in 1950 as a county hospital with 25 beds. The buildings were remodeled and expanded in 1975, 1985, 1998 and 2005. Originally called Montrose Memorial Hospital, it changed its name to Montrose Regional Health in October 2021. At that time, the hospital buildings were still owned by Montrose County, but the hospital was operated by a non-profit organization. In 2023, the county commissioners voted to transfer ownership of the hospital buildings to the organization running the hospital.
