= Pagosa Springs Medical Center =

- Upper San Juan Health Service District
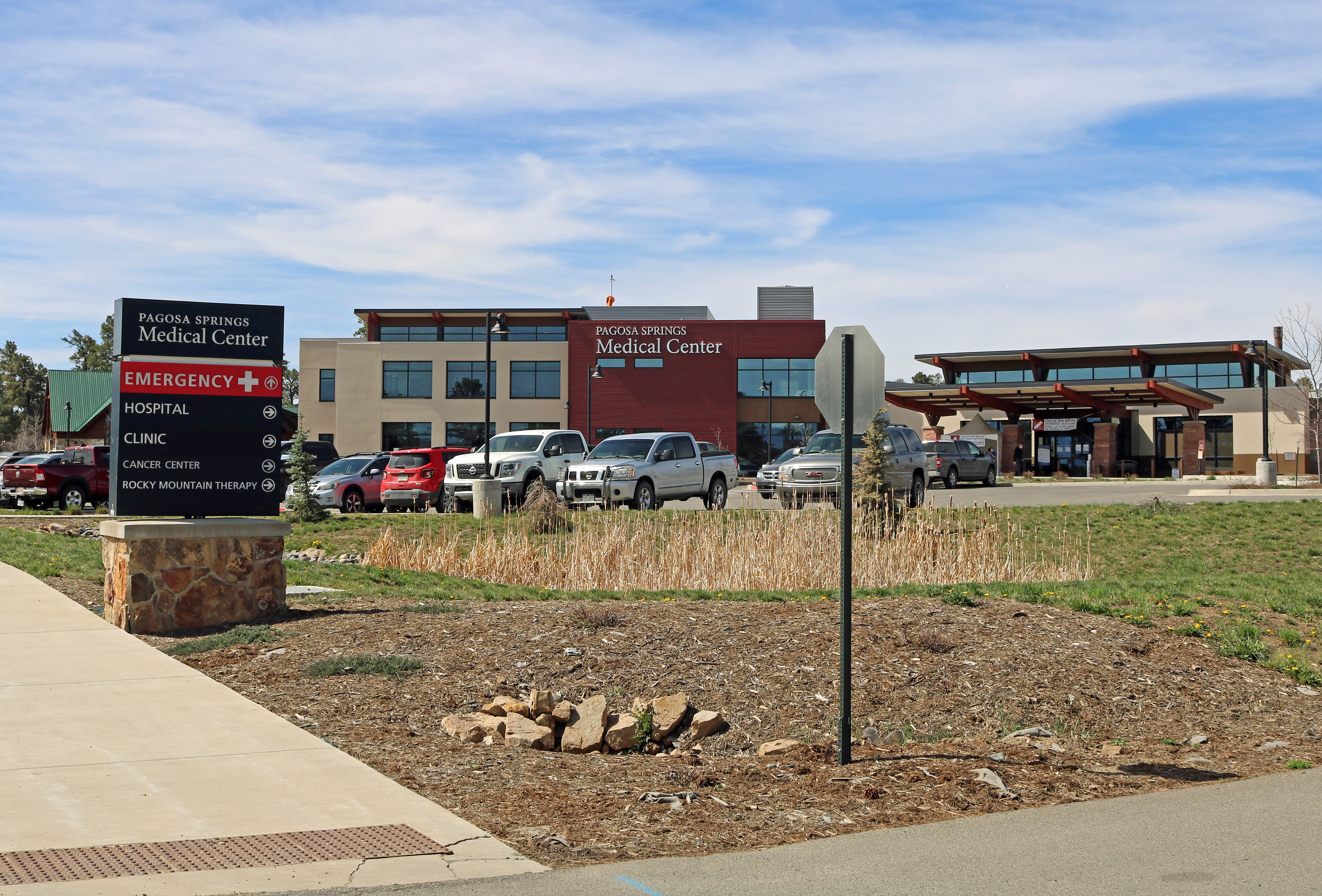
- The hospital's main entrance area

- The hospital's location in Colorado.

Geography
- Location: 95 South Pagosa Boulevard; Pagosa Springs, Colorado 81147, Colorado, United States
- Coordinates: 37°17′07″N 107°04′42″W

Organization
- Care system: Public
- Type: Rural, District

Services
- Emergency department: Level IV trauma center
- Beds: 11

History
- Founded: 2008

Links
- Website: pagosaspringsmedicalcenter.org
- Lists: Hospitals in Colorado

Pagosa Springs Medical Center is a critical access hospital in Pagosa Springs, Colorado, in Archuleta County. The hospital has 11 beds. It is a Level IV trauma center.

== History ==
The medical center is owned and operated by a public Health Service District, a special district serving all of Archuleta County, and the parts of Hinsdale and Mineral counties that are south of the continental divide. The special district was formed in 1981, and the current hospital building opened in early 2008.
