= St. Vincent Health (Leadville, Colorado) =

- St. Vincent General Hospital District
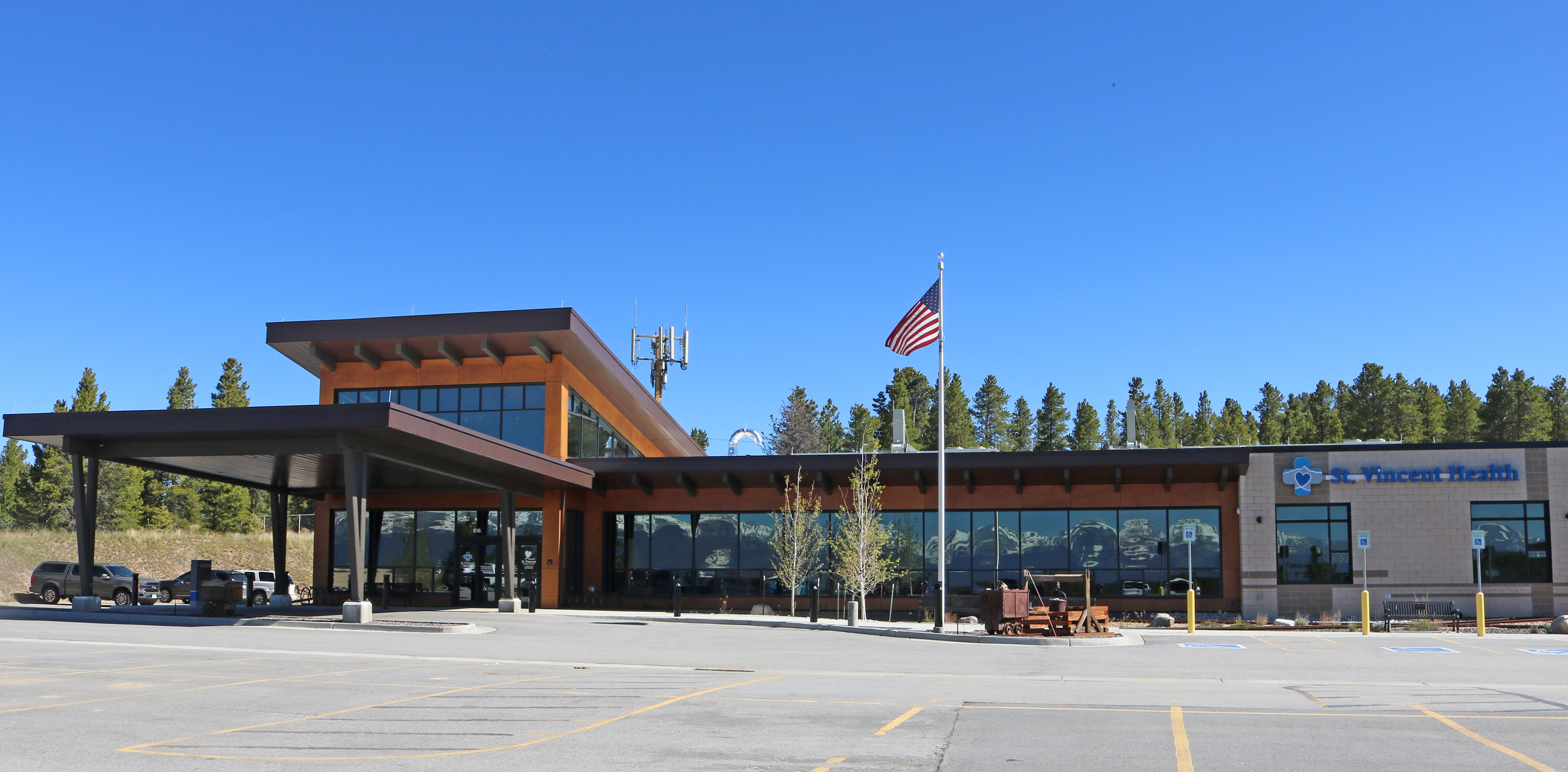
- The hospital's main entrance area, with the mountains of the northern Sawatch Range reflected on the windows

- The hospital's location in Colorado.

Geography
- Location: 822 West 4th Street; Leadville, Colorado 80461, Lake County, Colorado, United States
- Coordinates: 39°14′43″N 106°18′8″W

Organization
- Care system: Hospital district
- Type: General

Services
- Beds: 8

History
- Founded: 1879

Links
- Website: leadvillehospital.org
- Lists: Hospitals in Colorado

St. Vincent Health is a critical access hospital in Leadville, Colorado, in Lake County. The hospital has 8 beds. Hospital departments include: Acute Care, Swing Bed, Primary Care Clinic, 24/7 ER and Ambulance Service, Imaging, Lab, Wound Care, Physical Therapy, Occupational Therapy, Speech Therapy,

== History and organization ==
The hospital was founded in 1879 by the Sisters of Leavenworth. The sisters sold the hospital in 1972 to the special hospital district that was formed at that time.

=== St. Vincent General Hospital District ===
The hospital is owned and run by the St. Vincent General Hospital District. The district comprises Lake County and is governed by an elected board of directors.

=== New hospital building ===
The hospital opened a new, $26 million hospital building in September 2021, replacing the previous building constructed in 1958.
