= Prowers Medical Center =

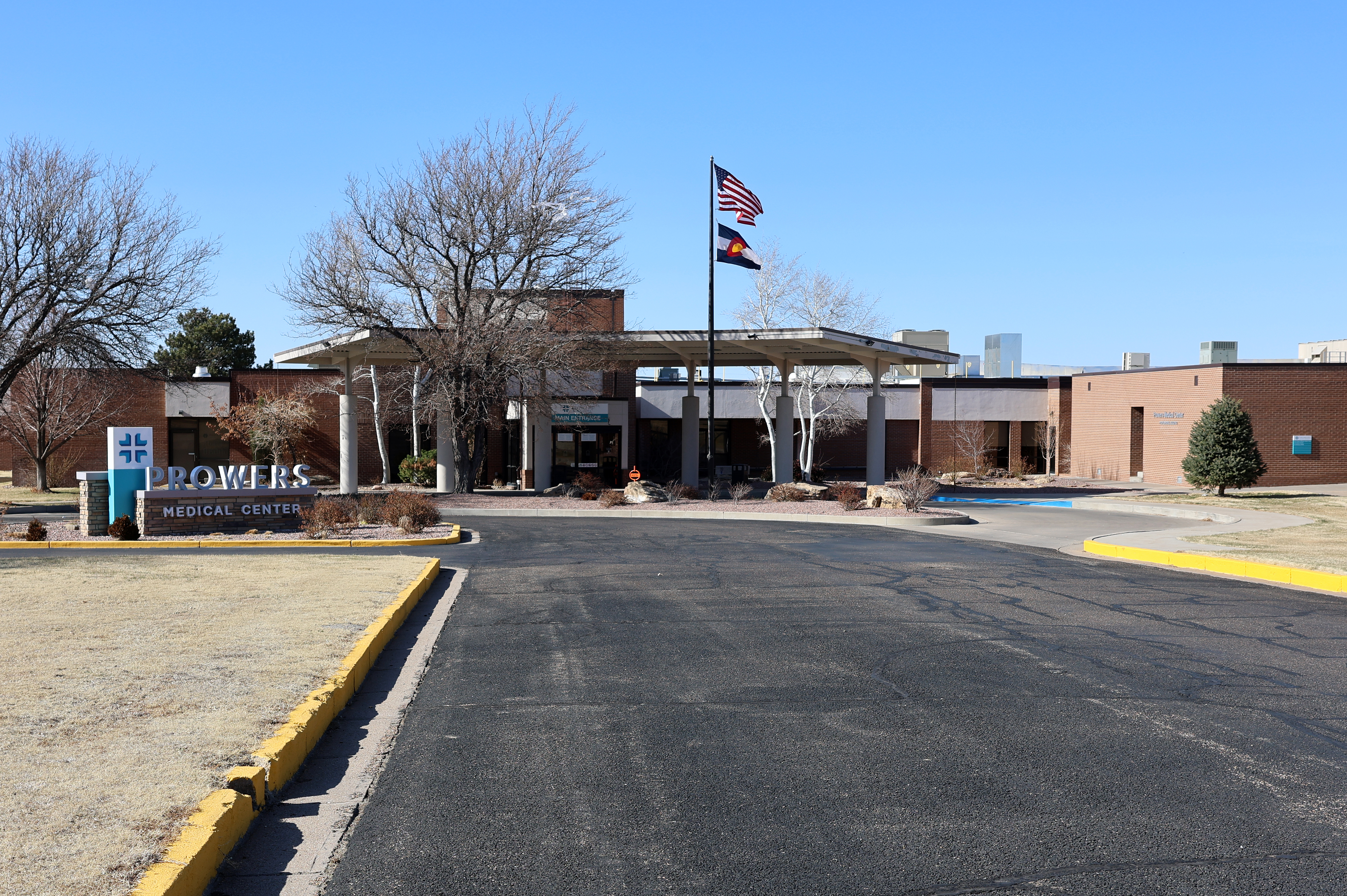
- The hospital's main entrance and parking area

- The hospital's location in Colorado.

Geography
- Location: 401 Kendall Drive; Lamar, Colorado, Prowers County, Colorado, United States
- Coordinates: 38°4′12.87″N 102°36′35.26″W

Organization
- Care system: District hospital
- Type: Critical access hospital

Services
- Emergency department: Level IV trauma center
- Beds: 25

History
- Founded: 1967

Links
- Website: www.prowersmedical.com
- Lists: Hospitals in Colorado

Prowers Medical Center is a critical access hospital in Lamar, Colorado, in Prowers County. The hospital is a level IV trauma center.

== History ==
Lamar's first hospital was a privately funded hospital called Charles Maxwell Hospital that began operating in 1920. Maxwell Hospital's first dedicated hospital building was built in 1928. In 1946, the Dominican Sisters of the Immaculate Conception bought the hospital and changed its name to Sacred Heart Hospital. In 1967, the Dominican Sisters, facing insufficient funding, decided to close the hospital. At this time, the community came together and formed the Prowers County Hospital District. A new hospital building was completed in 1978, and three expansions have been added since then.
