= Kit Carson County Memorial Hospital =

- Kit Carson County Health Service District
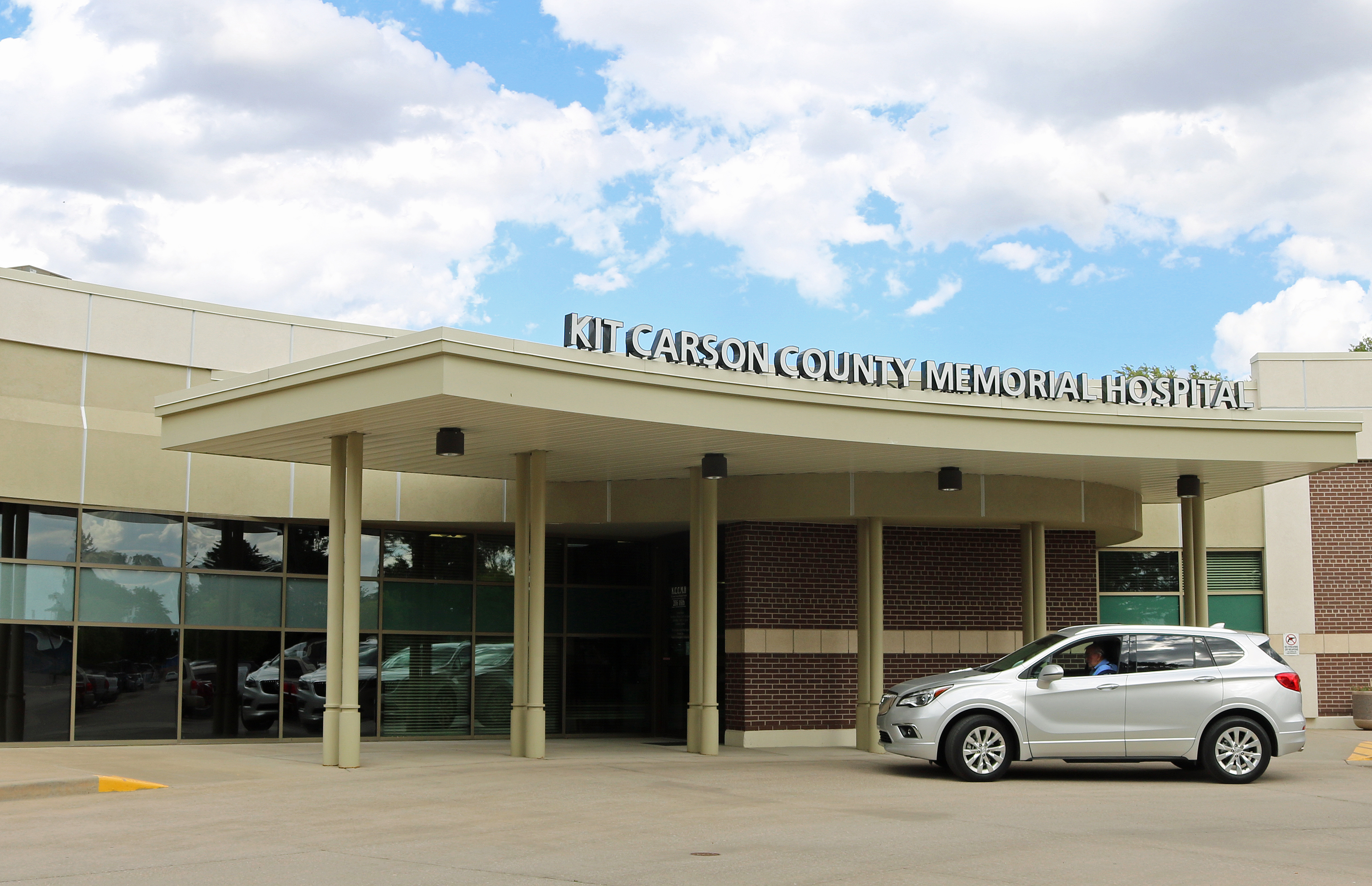
- The hospital's main entrance area

- The hospital's location in Colorado.

Geography
- Location: 286 16th Street; Burlington, Colorado 80807, Kit Carson County, Colorado, United States
- Coordinates: 39°18′10.16″N 102°16′14.49″W

Organization
- Type: [[Critical access hospital][District]]

Services
- Emergency department: Level IV trauma center
- Beds: 19

History
- Founded: 1946

Links
- Website: www.kcchsd.org/home.aspx
- Lists: Hospitals in Colorado

Kit Carson County Memorial Hospital is a critical access hospital in Burlington, Colorado, in Kit Carson County. Originally established in 1946, the hospital has 19 beds.

The hospital is part of the Kit Carson County Health Service District. Other facilities within the district include the Parke Health Center, the Parke Wellness Center, the Stratton Medical Clinic, the Seibert Clinic, and the Kit Carson County Home Health and Caring Hands Service.

The hospital is a Level IV trauma center.
