= Longmont United Hospital =

- CommonSpirit Health
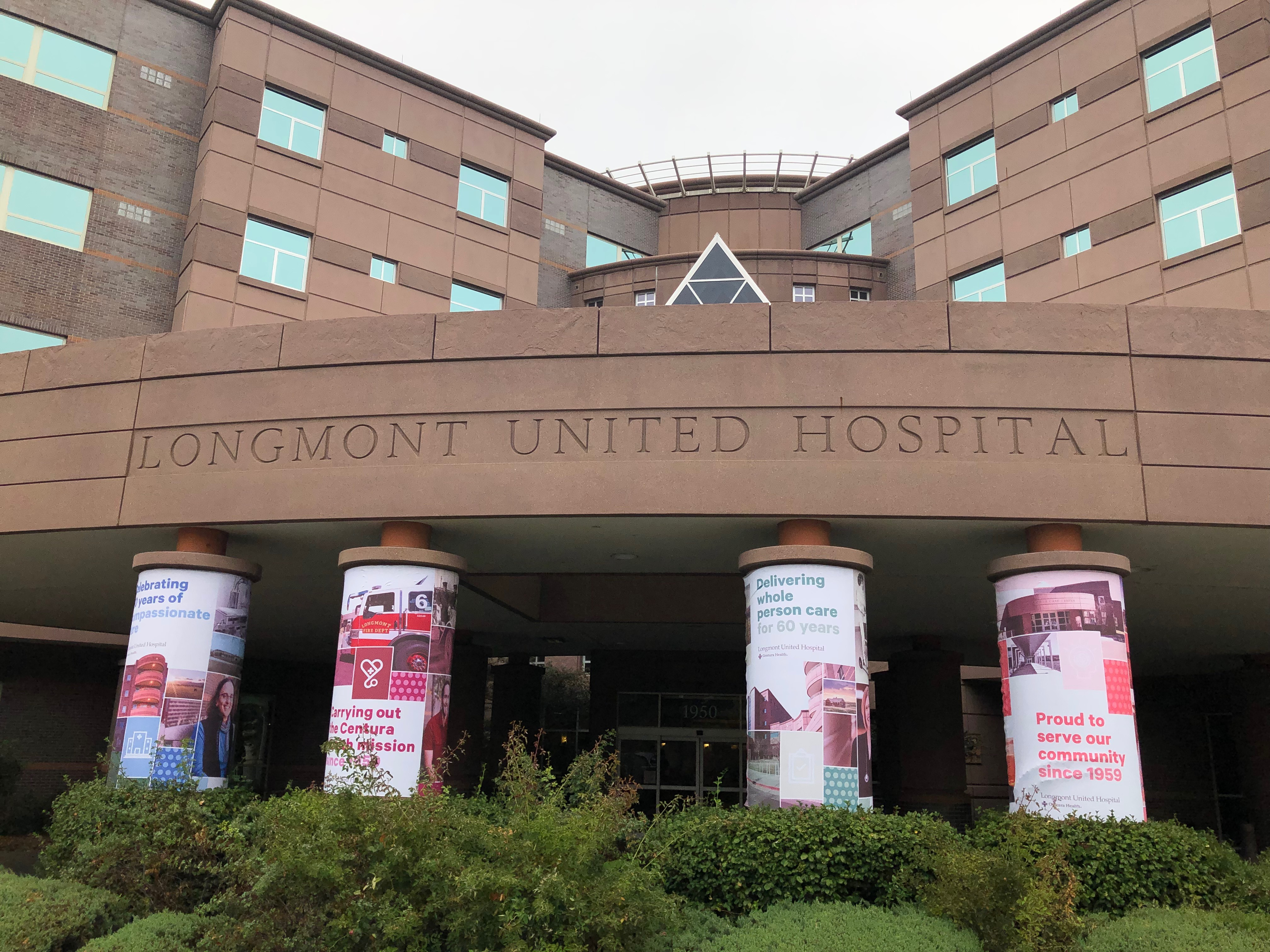

Geography
- Location: 1950 Mountain View Avenue, Longmont, Colorado, United States
- Coordinates: 40°10′56″N 105°07′34″W

Services
- Emergency department: Level III trauma center
- Beds: 186

Links
- Website: www.mountain.commonspirit.org/location/longmont-united-hospital
- Lists: Hospitals in Colorado

Longmont United Hospital is an acute hospital in Longmont, Colorado, United States.

The hospital has 186 beds. It includes a 24-hour emergency department.

The hospital is a Level III trauma center.

== History ==
Since its foundation in 1959, Longmont United Hospital has provided people throughout Boulder County and the surrounding communities compassionate, personalized, whole-person care.

The Longmont Community Hospital Association was organized in 1955 by a group of business leaders and physicians with the express purpose of establishing a community hospital for the care and treatment of the sick. The citizens of the community raised the necessary funds to construct the hospital and it opened in 1959 with 50 beds and 19 physicians.

LUH joined Centura Health in 2015, Colorado's largest health network at the time with 17 hospitals and a number of senior living communities, medical clinics, Flight for Life Colorado, and home care and hospice services.

On August 1, 2023, Centura Health split back into two healthcare organizations, AdventHealth and CommonSpirit. At that time, Longmont United Hospital became part of CommonSpirit Health.
