= Flight for Life =

American prehospital care service

Flight for Life is a prehospital care service with many bases of operation across the United States. Flight for Life is primarily known for its emergency medical helicopter transport, but also operates a fleet of land vehicles and fixed-wing aircraft for the transport of critically ill patients to specialized medical care. Helicopter transport is normally reserved for the most critically injured patients or patients who cannot be reached by traditional means of Emergency medical services. Helicopter transport is also especially useful for the transport of critically wounded patients to specialty medical facilities, such as burn, pediatric, or advanced trauma centers, that may be further away from the location of injury. Many rural communities rely on the speed of the helicopter to reach and evacuate their most serious patients to an available medical center. The helicopter may also be used for search and rescue operations in conjunction with ground units or alone.

== History ==
Flight For Life began in 1972 with a single Alouette III helicopter, based at St. Anthony Central Hospital in Denver, Colorado. It was the first civilian, hospital-based medical helicopter program in the U.S. It has grown to be a regional program responding to nine states.

The idea was generated from St. Anthony administrator E. V. Kuhlman, who wanted to improve medical transport of patients from the mountains and rural areas.

People teased him that he'd seen too many episodes of MASH, and one of his board members called him a “lunatic”. But he persisted with Drs. Dan Dracon and Henry Cleveland, and Asst. Admin. Jack Goetzinger. When the “bird went up” and became successful and copied, Kuhlman found his cynical Franciscan nun board member and told her, “Sister, every now and then the lunatic fringe becomes the cutting edge.”

Recruitment of helicopter pilots was not difficult given the Vietnam War and helicopter pilots returning to the US and looking for challenging jobs. Likewise nurses, techs, and before long paramedics were lined up to be a part of the Flight For Life team.

The choice for an Alouette helicopter came simply because of the need to reach high altitudes in the Rockies and Alouettes were the best. Kuhlman also had the idea to paint the helicopter orange, so that it would be easily seen; he never admitted that it would become the marketing tool that it became.

The Flight program itself was never a profitable venture, but it was Kuhlman's mantra of “the right thing to do” — and it brought in an increased number of referrals and recognition of St. Anthony

On June 1, 2004, St. Anthony Flight For Life and Penrose-St. Francis Flight For Life in Colorado Springs, Colorado consolidated under a single administrative structure based at St. Anthony Hospital and became Flight For Life Colorado. The following November, operations expanded to Pueblo, Colorado with a fourth helicopter.

In August 2011, a fifth helicopter and second fixed-wing base were added in Durango, Colorado.

== Training ==
The Flight For Life organization comprises many teams, made up of Nurses, Paramedics, EMT-Bs, Respiratory therapists, Pilots, and Mechanics.

Traditionally the helicopter is staffed by a flight crew composed of an experienced pilot, critical care nurse, and critical care paramedic. If advanced knowledge of the patient's condition is known before takeoff, the crew may also include a respiratory therapist, medical doctor or other specialized medical personnel.

Because of the training and medical equipment available on the helicopter a higher level of care can normally be provided by the crew on the scene of the accident and in-transit to an appropriate medical facility. The flight nurse and paramedic can usually perform more advanced acts and procedure needed for critical patients than the traditional Paramedic on-scene. This includes the placement and monitoring of chest-tubes, certain surgical procedures, an aortic balloon-pump and all of the acts allowed by EMTs and Paramedics.

The pilot's chief responsibility is the safe operation of the aircraft. Any crew member (pilot, nurse, or paramedic) may turn down a trip if they are not comfortable. All helicopter operations are under “visual flight rules” (VFR), so weather factors will significantly affect a pilot's decision.

== Equipment ==
=== Helicopters ===
Currently Flight for Life Colorado operates distinctively painted orange Eurocopter Ecureuil AS 350 “AStar” helicopters. Chosen for its high altitude capability and economy of operation, the AStar is a fit for Colorado's mountain communities and terrain. The helicopters are based at St. Anthony Hospital in Lakewood (Lifeguard 1), St. Anthony's Summit Medical Center in Frisco (Lifeguard 2), Penrose-St. Francis Hospital in Colorado Springs (Lifeguard 3), St. Mary- Corwin Medical Center in Pueblo (Lifeguard 4). As of January 3, 2010 all four are in service twenty-four hours a day, seven days a week. They have a service radius of approximately one hundred and twenty miles (190 km) from their bases. As of August 15, 2011 operations will expand with a new base at Mercy Regional Medical Center in Durango (Lifeguard 5). All helicopters are leased from Air Methods Corporation in Englewood, Colorado. Pilots and mechanics are employees of Air Methods Corp.

=== Airplanes ===
When the transport is beyond the range of the helicopter, or when weather precludes flight to a location, a fixed-wing aircraft is called into service. Flight For Life partners with Mayo Aviation, LLC. at Centennial Airport in Englewood, Colorado for a dedicated Beechcraft Super King Air 200. This pressurized, twin turboprop aircraft is capable of instrument flight (IFR) at a speed of 265 nautical miles (491 km) per hour (knots), and is used for flights of up to approximately 800 miles (1,290 km) round trip distance. The pilots are all proficient in multi-engine and instrument flight. Outfitted in a dedicated air medical configuration, the KingAir is capable of transporting any combination of two adult patients, one adult and an isolette, or two isolettes. On most flights, at least one family member is also able to fly along. The bases in Colorado Springs and Pueblo, Colorado do not have dedicated fixed-wing aircraft. When the weather makes helicopter flight impossible, the aircraft from Mayo Aviation may be sent to them to help move a critical patient.

=== Ground ===
In some cases, patients may need transport from one ICU to another, for specialized care. Flight For Life's Critical Care Transport (CCT), known as “Terra One”, is a specially outfitted ambulance, staffed by one of the adult team flight nurses and a paramedic. Ground transport is performed roughly within a two-hour drive radius of Denver; Cheyenne to the north, Limon to the east, Pueblo to the south, and Vail to the west.

Based at St. Anthony's Central, Terra One is capable of moving patients while maintaining the highest levels of care. Some examples of patients that are transported include cardiac patients receiving vasoactive, anticoagulant, or fibrinolytic infusions, mechanically ventilated patients, patients undergoing IABP therapy, or for any patient that needs continuous ICU level care en route.

Terra Two, is a CCT ambulance based at Summit Medical Center in Frisco, and is in service when Lifeguard Two is grounded by weather, and at night. This provides the mountain communities with round the clock access to critical care transport, regardless of weather conditions. Terra Two is operated in partnership with Summit County Ambulance, which provides the EMT and a paramedic to assist with patient care.

The Newborn/Young Child Team travels via its own dedicated CCT ambulance, (Terra Three), and fixed-wing aircraft, and helicopter, twenty-four hours a day. When circumstances demand, the helicopter may be used to transport the Newborn/Young Child Team to a referring facility to attend a pending delivery or provide emergency assistance, while the ground ambulance proceeds toward that location for the trip back. A neonate may also be safely transported aboard the helicopter in a specially equipped isolette.

In certain circumstances, several transport resources may be needed to transport a patient to an appropriate destination. Weather conditions may prevent a helicopter from reaching the scene or referring facility, or a mass casualty incident may tax all other resources. In these situations, the flight crews will do whatever is appropriate to safely accomplish the transport.

== General sources ==
- "Flight for Life Colorado". January 4, 2007.
