= Heart of the Rockies Regional Medical Center =

- Salida Hospital District
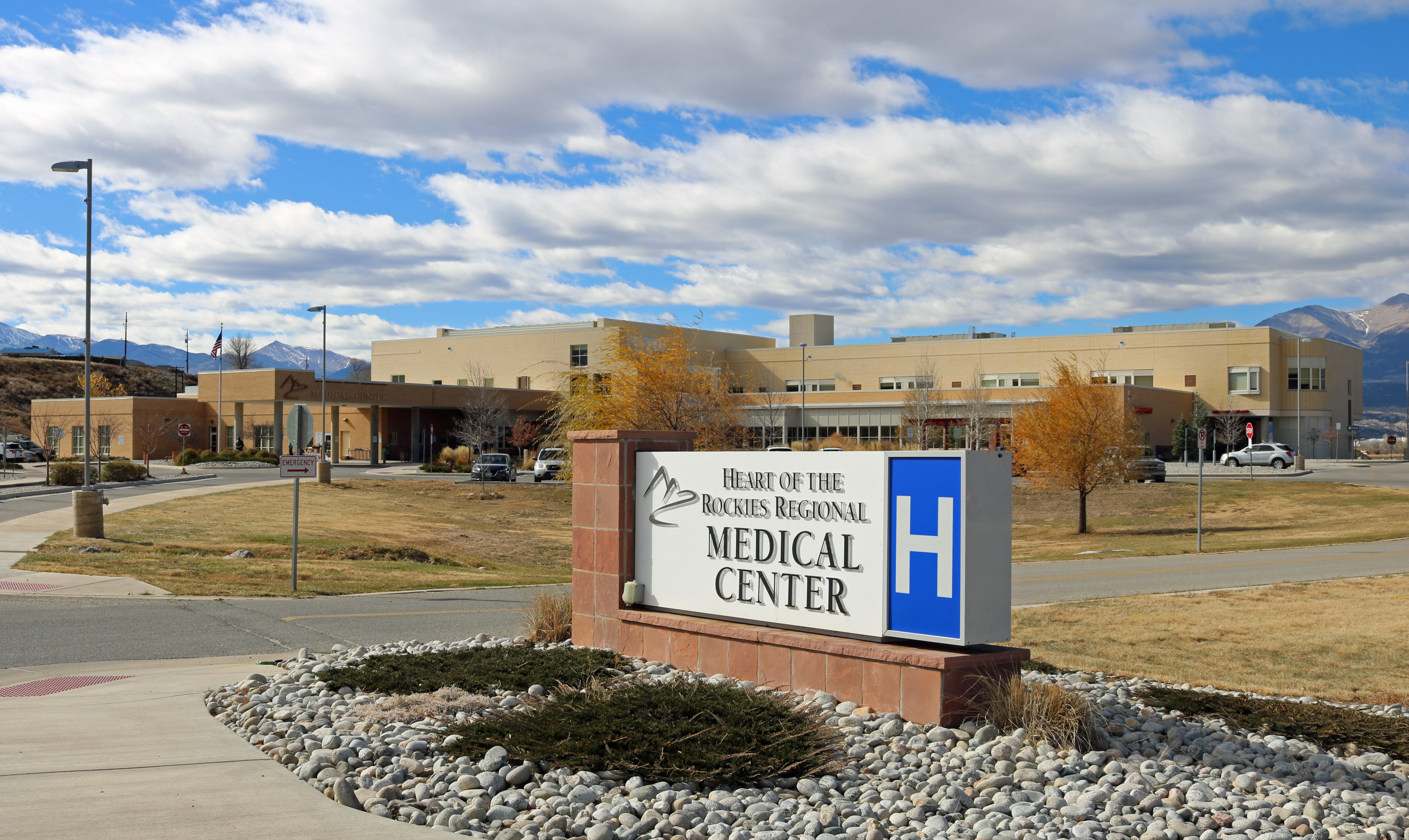
- The hospital's entrance.

- The hospital's location in Colorado.

Geography
- Location: 1000 Rush Drive Salida, Chaffee County, Colorado, United States
- Coordinates: 38°32′34″N 106°0′30″W

Organization
- Care system: Public regional healthcare system
- Type: Health Service District
- Affiliated university: None

Services
- Emergency department: Level IV trauma center
- Beds: 25

Helipads
- Helipad: Yes

History
- Founded: 1885

Links
- Website: www.hrrmc.com//
- Lists: Hospitals in Colorado

The Heart of the Rockies Regional Medical Center may refer to a regional hospital in Salida, Colorado, or the Colorado Health Service District and health system called Salida Hospital District.

The Salida Hospital District dba Heart of the Rockies Regional Medical Center is one of Colorado's Special Districts, specifically a Health Service District.

The Salida Hospital District was formed in 1976, and as of 1989 it is dba Heart of the Rockies Regional Medical Center. The Salida Hospital District covers all of Chaffee county and parts of Fremont and Saguache counties. The Salida Hospital District is a health system as it also operates several facilities outside of its geographical district including the Custer County Health Center. Overall the estimated population in the special district itself is 40,000 with an additional 20,000 people living in the rural areas proximal to facilities operated by the Salida Hospital District.

The Salida Hospital District operates a critical access hospital, six primary care clinics, multiple subspecialty clinics, an outpatient rehabilitation center, and two pharmacies.

== History ==
The hospital was originally founded by the Denver & Rio Grande Railroad in 1885 to serve its employees. The railroad sold the hospital to private investors in 1962, and they operated it until 1976, when it became a district hospital. The current name dates from 1989, and the hospital moved to its current location in 2008. The hospital is part of the Salida Hospital District, a special district which covers Chaffee County and portions of Saguache and Fremont counties in central Colorado. Salida Hospital is a Critical Access Hospital, the hospital has 25 beds and a level IV trauma certification.
