= Wray Community District Hospital =

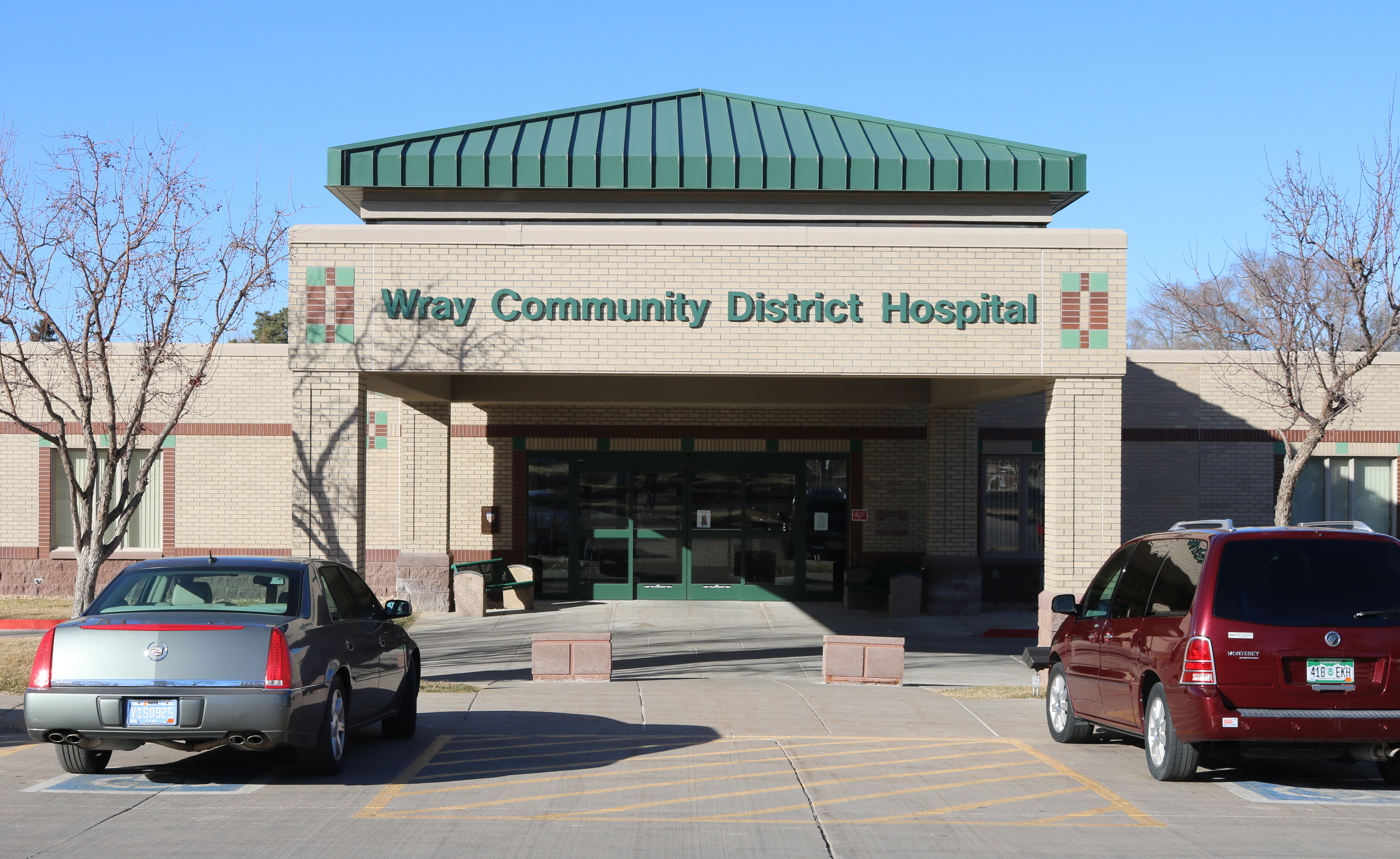

- The hospital's location in Colorado.

Geography
- Location: Wray, Yuma County, Colorado, United States
- Coordinates: 40°4′32″N 102°14′5″W

Organization
- Care system: Public District
- Type: District

Services
- Emergency department: Level IV trauma center
- Beds: 15

History
- Founded: 1995

Links
- Website: wrayhospital.org
- Lists: Hospitals in Colorado

Wray Community District Hospital is a community hospital owned and operated by the Wray Community Hospital District in Wray, Colorado. Built in 1995, the hospital has fifteen beds. The hospital district has an affiliation with the Western Healthcare Alliance.

The hospital is a Level IV trauma center.
