= Catholic Health Initiatives =

American hospital network

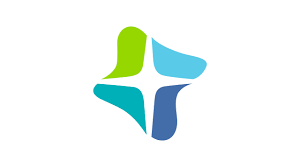

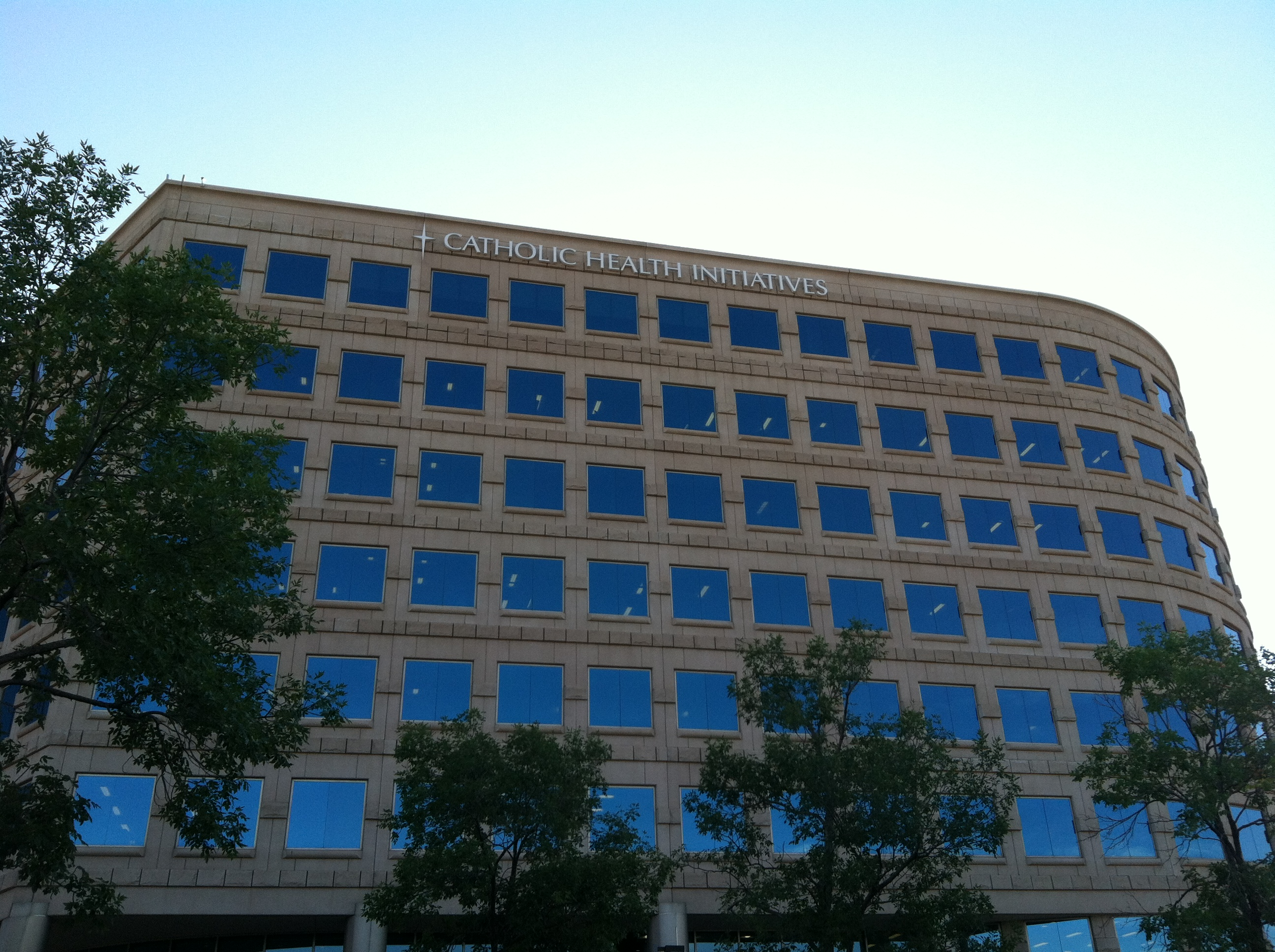
- Catholic Health Initiatives headquarters in Englewood, Colorado
- Type: Private
- Industry: Healthcare
- Founded: 1996; 30 years ago
- Defunct: January 31, 2019
- Headquarters: Englewood, Colorado, U.S.
- Area served: CO, NE, PA, OH, KY, ND, IN, TX, AR, IA, MN, NJ, OR, TN, WA
- Key people: Kevin E. Lofton (CEO)
- Divisions: CHI Health
- Subsidiaries: Centura Health (partnership with AdventHealth); Premier Health Partners (partnership); TriHealth (partnership); MercyOne (partnership with Trinity Health; Virginia Mason Franciscan Health
- Website: www.catholichealthinitiatives.org

Catholic Health Initiatives (CHI) was an American Catholic healthcare system, with headquarters in Englewood, Colorado. CHI was a nonprofit, faith-based health system formed, in 1996, through the consolidation of three Catholic health systems. It was one of the largest healthcare systems in the United States. In February 2019, CHI merged with Dignity Health, forming CommonSpirit Health.

== History ==
=== Founding ===
CHI began operations in 1996. The founding systems were the Catholic Health Corporation of Omaha, Nebraska, the Franciscan Health System of Aston, Pennsylvania, and the Sisters of Charity Health Care Systems of Cincinnati, Ohio.

=== Expansion ===
In September 1997, the Sisters of Charity of Nazareth Health System in Nazareth, Kentucky consolidated with Catholic Health Initiatives. In March 1998, the Sisters of St. Francis of the Immaculate Heart of Mary in Hankinson, North Dakota transferred sponsorship of a hospital and eight clinics to CHI. In September 2010, Consolidated Health Services, a home care service provider with 30 locations in Kentucky, Ohio, and Indiana, joined CHI. Home health is later re-branded as CHI Health at Home. In May 2013, St. Luke's Episcopal Health System, a six-hospital system based in Houston, Texas, joined CHI as St. Luke's Health System. The organization included outpatient clinics in Houston and affiliations with Baylor College of Medicine, Kelsey-Seybold Clinic, Texas Heart Institute, Texas Children's Hospital, and MD Anderson Cancer Center. On April 1, 2014, Mercy Health of Hot Springs, Arkansas signed a definitive agreement to transfer ownership of Mercy Hot Springs hospital and medical group to CHI St. Vincent. In June 2014, CHI St. Luke's Health Memorial of Lufkin, Texas joined CHI. In October 2014, CHI St. Alexius Health of Bismarck, North Dakota becomes a direct affiliate of CHI, adding St. Alexius Medical Center and two critical access hospitals to the system. In November 2014, Sylvania Franciscan Health becomes part of CHI, adding St. Joseph Health System in the Brazos Valley region of Texas; Franciscan Living Communities in Kentucky and Ohio; and three hospitals in eastern Ohio to the system In January 2016, Brazosport Regional Health System in Lake Jackson, Texas joins CHI St. Luke's Health, Houston. In December 2017, Dignity Health and CHI announce a definitive agreement to merge.

CHI has expanded since 2011, entering new states and expanding in existing ones. CHI also acquired the health insurer QualChoice, but was unsuccessful in its ownership; QualChoice is currently for sale.

=== 2019 merger ===
In 2018, Dignity Health and Catholic Health Initiatives received a merger approval from the Catholic Church, through the Vatican. Merged on February 1, 2019, as CommonSpirit Health, the new company formed as the largest Catholic health system, and the second-largest nonprofit hospital chain, in the United States.

In January 2019, the KentuckyOne Health system decided to transition to the legacy of the Sisters of Charity of Nazareth, Lexington's first hospital. Focusing on central and southern Kentucky, it is one of the largest health organizations in the Commonwealth of Kentucky. KentuckyOne Health system hospitals and clinics in the Louisville area was later purchased by the University of Louisville's UofL Health.

== Operations ==
Colorado-based CHI is one of the nation's largest health systems, operating in 18 states and comprising 104 hospitals, including four academic health centers and major teaching hospitals and 30 critical-access facilities; community health-services organizations; accredited nursing colleges; home-health agencies; and other facilities that span the inpatient and outpatient continuum of care.

In fiscal year 2014, CHI provided $910 million in charity care and community benefit - a nearly 20% increase over the previous year - for programs and services for the poor, free clinics, education and research. Charity care and community benefit totaled more than $1.7 billion with the inclusion of the unpaid costs of Medicare. The health system, which generated revenues of almost $3.9 billion (FY 2018), has total assets of $5.1 billion.

=== Shareholder activism ===
CHI practices shareholder activism by purchasing shares in publicly traded corporations and engaging with corporate management on environmental, social and corporate governance issues. Following the 2018 Stoneman Douglas High School shooting, in example; Catholic Health Initiatives was the lead filer, co-filing with the Adrian Dominican Sisters, of a shareholder resolution asking firearms manufacturer Sturm, Ruger & Co. to report to investors regarding the steps they are taking to reduce gun violence. Ruger opposed the resolution. BlackRock, the world's largest asset manager and Ruger's largest investor, as well as Institutional Shareholder Services and Glass Lewis, the two most important shareholder advisory firms in the United States, supported the resolution. At Ruger's annual meeting on May 9, 2018, 69 percent of shareholders voted in favor and Ruger agreed to heed the resolution. The Brady Campaign to Prevent Gun Violence called the vote a "first-of-its-kind victory."

== Controversy ==
In January 2013, the hospital's defense lawyers provoked controversy when they defended against a wrongful death lawsuit by arguing that unborn fetuses should not be classed as persons. This contradicted Catholic doctrine established by Pope John Paul II. When the case was submitted to the three bishops of Colorado for review, they issued a joint statement which reiterated their commitment to defending human dignity against attacks.

== Divisions ==
- Arkansas Hospitals (CHI St. Vincent)
  - CHI St. Vincent Infirmary, Little Rock, Arkansas
  - CHI St. Vincent Hot Springs, Hot Springs, Arkansas
  - CHI St. Vincent Morrilton, Morrilton, Arkansas
  - CHI St. Vincent North, Sherwood, Arkansas
- Centura Health, Englewood, Colorado (partnership with AdventHealth)
- MercyOne, Des Moines, Iowa (partnership with Trinity Health)
- Kentucky Hospitals (formerly KentuckyOne Health, now CHI Saint Joseph Health). VNA Health at Home and Amerimed locations are also part of Saint Joseph Health
  - CHI Saint Joseph Hospital, Lexington, Kentucky
  - CHI Saint Joseph East, Lexington, Kentucky (formerly Jewish Hospital Lexington)
  - Continuing Care Hospital, Lexington, Kentucky
  - CHI Saint Joseph Health - Women's Hospital, Lexington, KY
  - CHI Saint Joseph Hospital, Berea, Kentucky (formerly Berea Hospital)
  - CHI Saint Joseph Hospital, London, Kentucky (formerly Marymount – Our Lady of the Mountain)
  - CHI Saint Joseph Martin, Martin, Kentucky
  - CHI Saint Joseph Mount Sterling, Mount Sterling, KY (formerly Mary Chiles Hospital)
  - Flaget Memorial Hospital, Bardstown, KY
- Minnesota Hospitals
  - CHI LakeWood Health, Baudette, Minnesota
  - CHI St. Francis Health, Breckenridge, Minnesota
  - CHI St. Joseph's Health, Park Rapids, Minnesota
  - CHI St. Gabriel's Health, Little Falls, Minnesota
- Nebraska & Iowa Hospitals (CHI Health)
  - CHI Health Creighton University Medical Center Bergan Mercy, Omaha, Nebraska
  - CHI Health Good Samaritan, Kearney, Nebraska
  - CHI Health Immanuel Medical Center, Omaha, Nebraska
  - CHI Health Lakeside, Omaha, Nebraska
  - CHI Health Mercy, Corning, Iowa
  - CHI Health Mercy, Council Bluffs, Iowa
  - CHI Health Midlands, Papillion, Nebraska
  - CHI Health, Missouri Valley, Iowa
  - CHI Health Nebraska Heart, Lincoln, Nebraska
  - CHI Health Saint Elizabeth Regional Medical Center, Lincoln, Nebraska
  - CHI Health Saint Francis Medical Center, Grand Island, Nebraska
  - CHI Health Saint Mary's, Nebraska City, Nebraska
- Saint Clare's Health System, Denville, New Jersey
- North Dakota
  - CHI Lisbon Health
  - CHI Mercy Health
  - CHI Oakes Hospital
  - CHI St. Alexius Health
- Premier Health Partners, Dayton, Ohio (partnership)
- TriHealth, Cincinnati, Ohio (partnership with Bethesda Inc.)
- Oregon hospitals
  - CHI Mercy Health
  - CHI St. Anthony Hospital
- CHI St. Joseph Children's Health (Pennsylvania)
- CHI Memorial, Chattanooga, Tennessee
- Texas hospitals
  - CHI St. Joseph Health
  - CHI St. Luke's Health
    - Baylor St. Luke's Medical Center, Houston, Texas
- Washington hospitals: Virginia Mason Franciscan Health (2021 merger of Virginia Mason and CHI Franciscan)
  - Virginia Mason Medical Center
  - St. Anne Hospital
  - St. Anthony Hospital
  - St. Clare Hospital
  - St. Elizabeth Hospital
  - St. Francis Hospital
  - St Joseph Medical Center
  - St. Michael Medical Center
  - CHI Franciscan Rehabilitation Hospital
  - Wellfound Behavioral Health Hospital

== See also ==
- CHI Health Center Omaha
