= CommonSpirit Health =

Hospital network in the United States

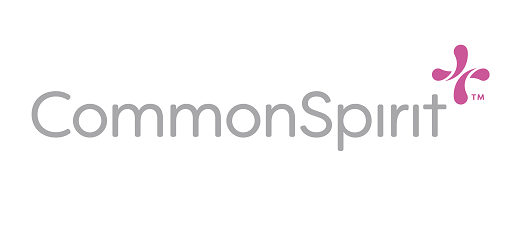
- Type: Private
- Industry: Healthcare
- Founded: February 1, 2019; 7 years ago
- Headquarters: Chicago, Illinois, U.S.
- Number of locations: 142 hospitals 700 care sites
- Key people: Wright L. Lassiter III (CEO)
- Services: Hospital management
- Revenue: ▲US$34.5 billion (2023)
- Total assets: 5,206,692,632 United States dollar (2011)
- Number of employees: 175,000 (2024)
- Divisions: Dignity Health; CHI Health
- Website: commonspirit.org
- Footnotes; Formed by 2019 merger

CommonSpirit Health is an American health system based in Chicago, Illinois. It is the country's largest Catholic hospital chain and its second-largest nonprofit hospital chain (as of 2019). It operates more than 700 care sites and 142 hospitals in 21 states.

Founded in 2019 by the merger of Dignity Health and Catholic Health Initiatives, CommonSpirit Health formed as one of the largest non-profit hospital systems by revenue in the United States.

== History ==
Formed on February 1, 2019, the hospital network was created by the merger of two nonprofit hospital systems: San Francisco-based Dignity Health, and Catholic Health Initiatives of Colorado.

Dignity Health was founded in 1986 as Catholic Healthcare West, when the Sisters of Mercy Burlingame Regional Community and the Sisters of Mercy Auburn Regional Community merged their healthcare ministries into one organization. Catholic Health Initiatives began operations in 1996. The founding systems were the Catholic Health Corporation of Omaha, Nebraska, the Franciscan Health System of Aston, Pennsylvania, and the Sisters of Charity Health Care Systems of Cincinnati, Ohio.

CommonSpirit reported operating losses of $227 million in the first quarter of 2020, while combining Dignity Health and Catholic Health Initiatives into a single organization.

In February 2021, CommonSpirit, along with 13 other health care systems such as Trinity Health and Tenet Healthcare, have combined to launch a data analytics company, Truveta.

== Leadership ==
Lloyd H. Dean and Kevin E. Lofton served as joint CEOs for the health system from its founding, in early 2019. Prior, Dean was CEO and president at Dignity Health, and Lofton was CEO of Catholic Health Initiatives. Lofton retired at the end of June 2020, leaving Dean as sole CEO. In 2022, Dean retired and was succeeded as CEO by Wright L. Lassiter III, previously of Henry Ford Health.
