= Regional hospital =

Hospital that serves a large geographic area

A regional hospital or district hospital is a hospital that serves a geographic region larger area than a single local or rural area. Some countries also define specific services that required in regional hospitals. The word regional or district may also be part of the name of the hospital. Regional hospitals sometimes serve specific needs that cannot be adequately met by a local or rural hospital, such as treating rare cancers, providing 24 hour emergency services, treating rare diseases such as ebola or rare conditions such as obstetric fistula, or providing elective orthopedic surgery.

== Country variations ==
In the National Health Service of the United Kingdom, a regional hospital is one that provides more complex services than a district hospital, such as transplantations or rare cancers.

The World Health Organization defines a regional hospital or provincial hospital as a secondary level hospital providing 5 to 10 clinical specialties and with 200 to 800 hospital beds. It is different from a smaller primary-level hospital and larger tertiary-level hospital.

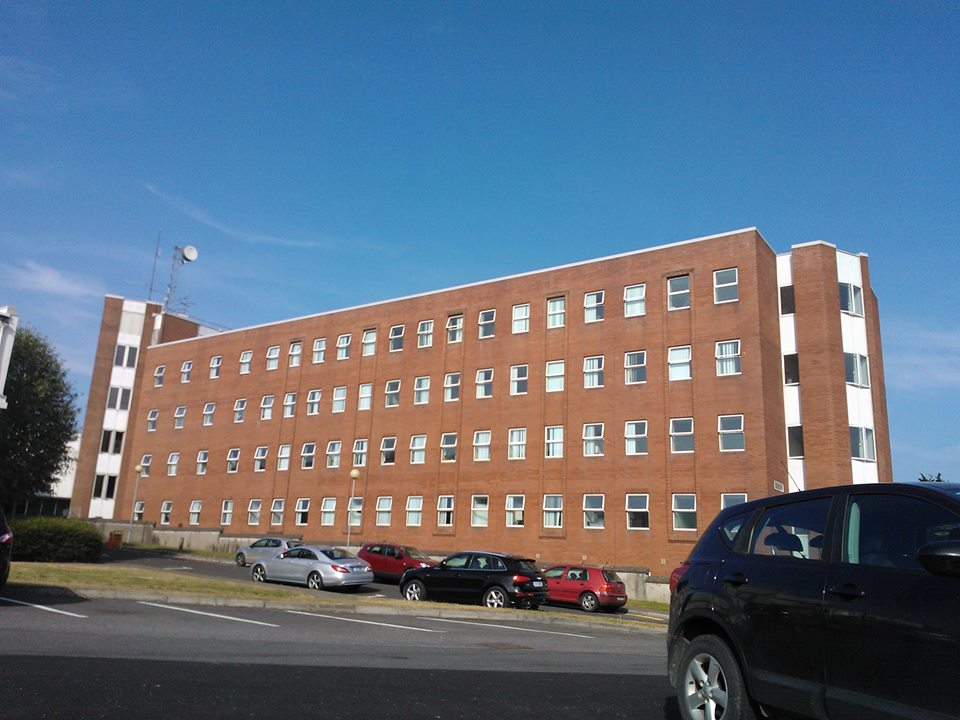
Midland Regional Hospital, Mullingar, Ireland.

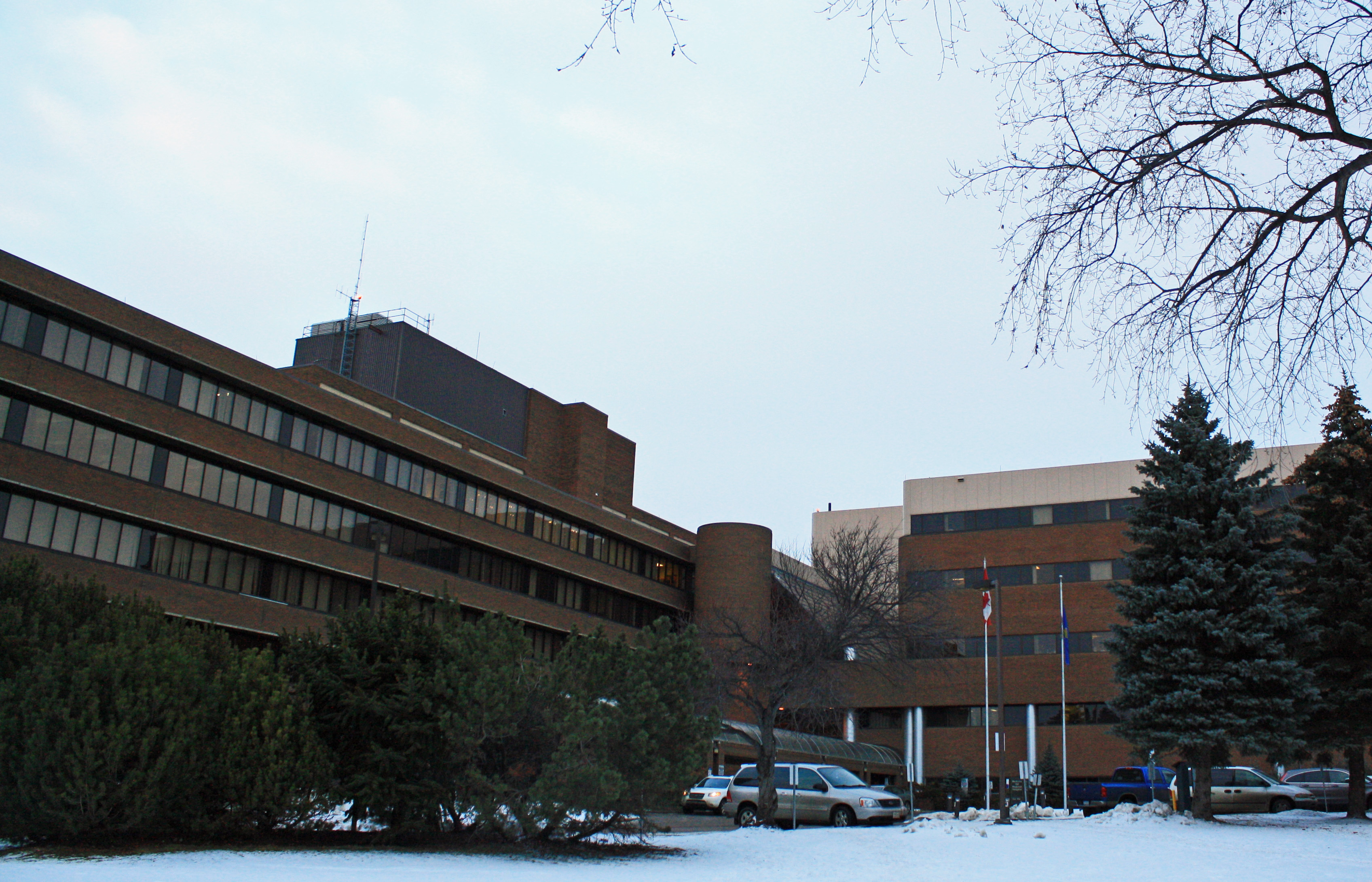
Medicine Hat Regional Hospital, Medicine Hat, Canada

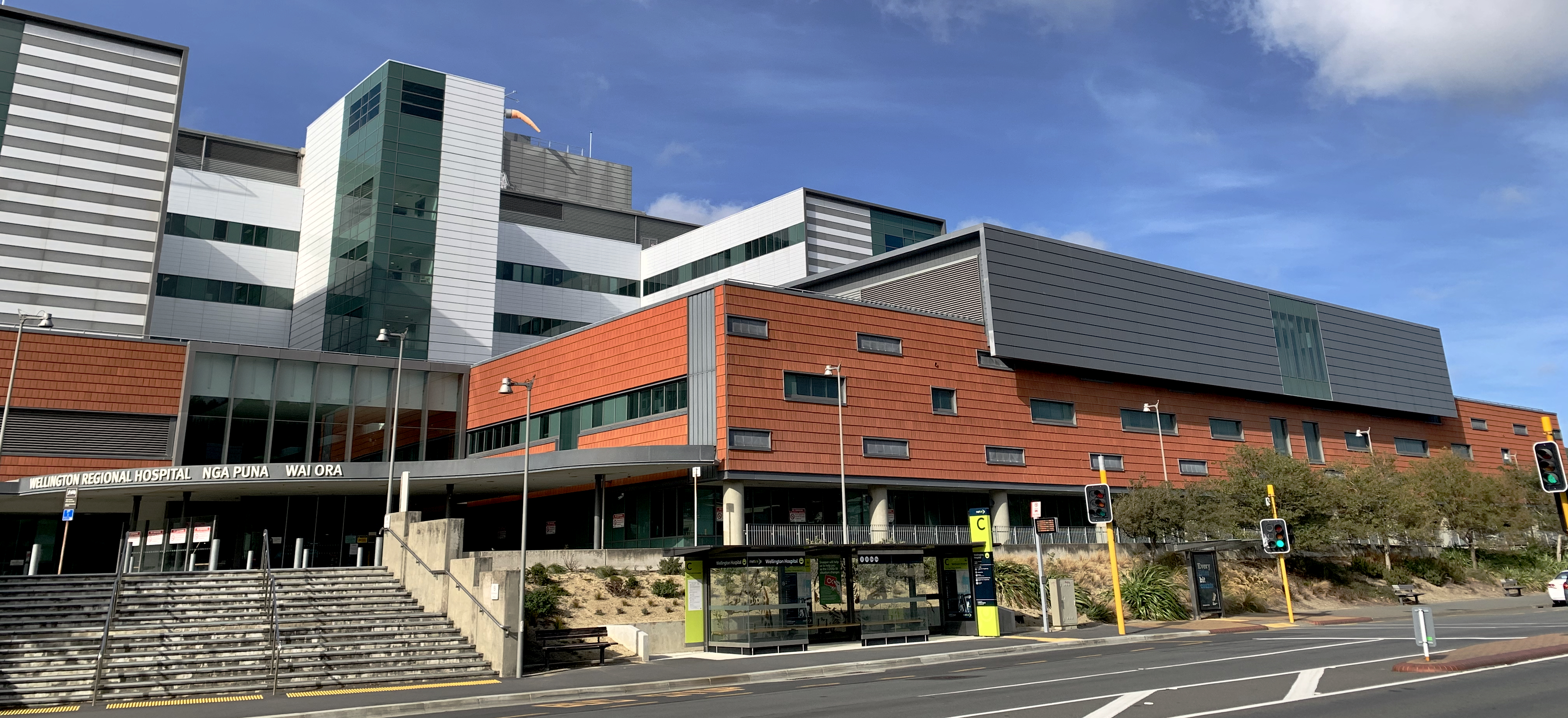
Wellington Hospital, regional hospital in Wellington, New Zealand

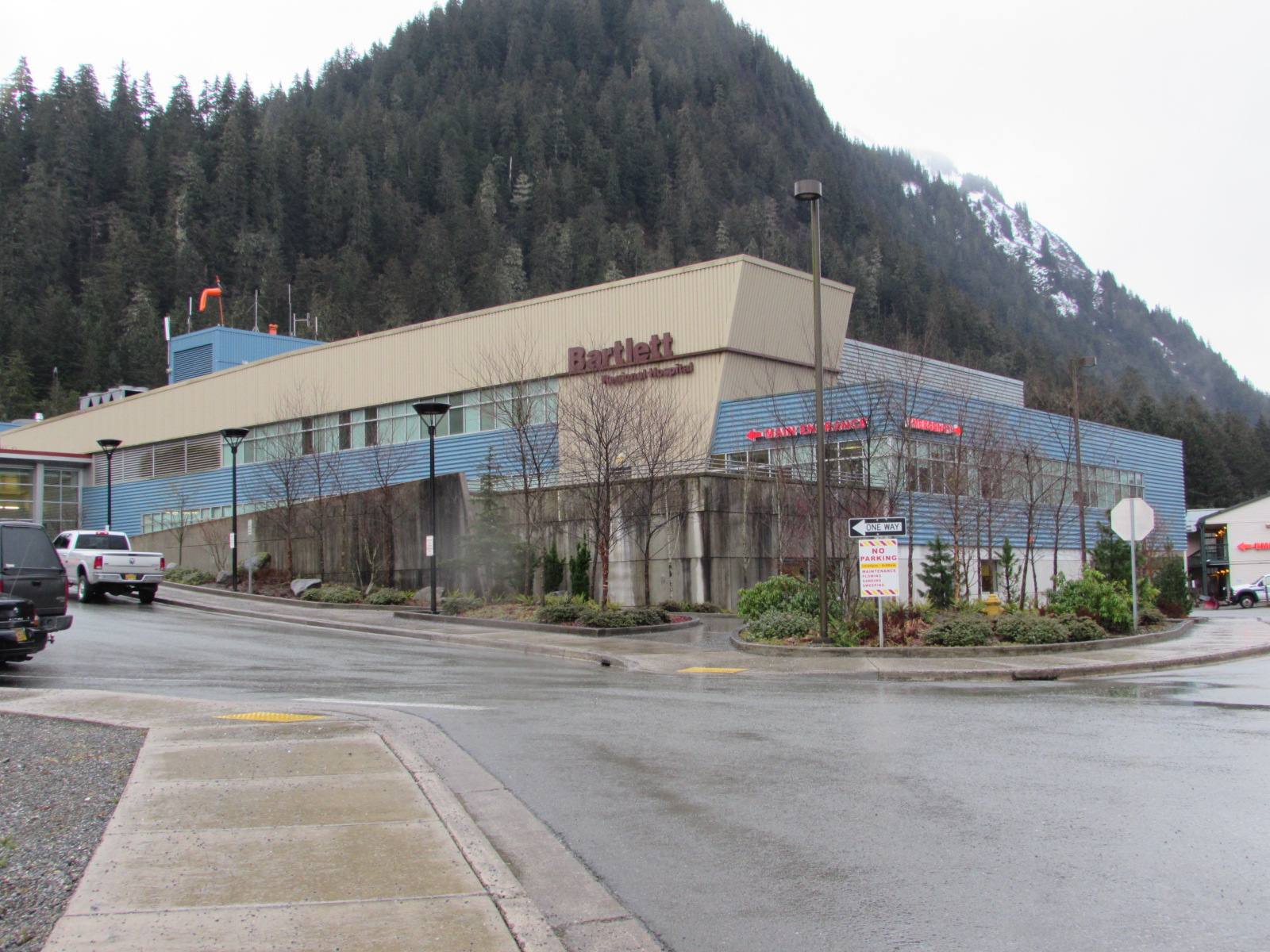
Bartlett Regional Hospital in Juneau, Alaska, U.S.

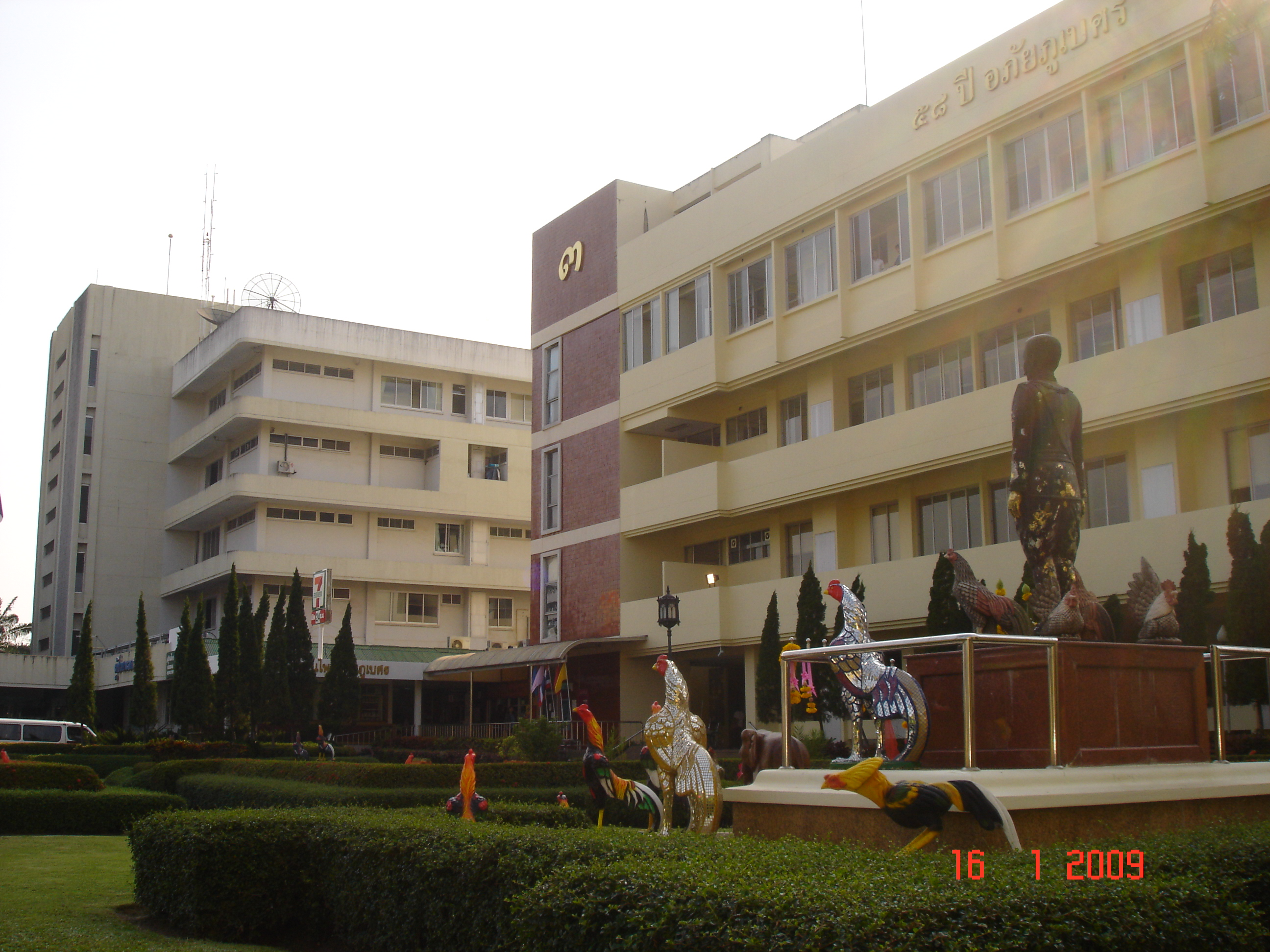
Chaophraya Abhaibhubejhr Hospital. a regional hospital in Prachinburi, Thailand

In South Africa, a regional hospital must provide the following services on a 24-hour basis:

- health services in the fields of internal medicine, paediatrics, obstetrics and gynaecology, and general surgery;
- health services in at least one of the following specialties—
  - orthopaedic surgery;
  - psychiatry;
  - anaesthetics;
  - diagnostic radiology;
  - trauma and emergency services;
- short-term ventilation in a critical care unit;
- services to a defined regional drainage population, limited to provincial boundaries and receives referrals from several district hospitals; and
- where practical, provide training for health care service providers.

In addition, a regional hospital receives outreach and support from tertiary hospitals has between 200 and 800 beds.

In Thailand, the classification of regional hospitals is different in that a regional hospital has higher treatment capabilities compared to a general hospital. Most regional hospitals are located in major provincial cities, while general hospitals serve smaller provincial cities and towns.

== See also ==
- Health care, Primary care, Secondary Care, Tertiary care, Quaternary care
