= Critical access hospital =

Type of Medicare facility

A critical access hospital (CAH) in the United States is a type of Medicare facility designation for certain rural hospitals, available through a state's rural hospital flexibility program (flex program). These programs allow states to designate small rural hospitals as CAHs if they are sufficiently distant from other facilities, provide 24-hour emergency services, and meet limits on inpatient beds and length of stay. The programs and designations were first authorized by the Balanced Budget Act of 1997.

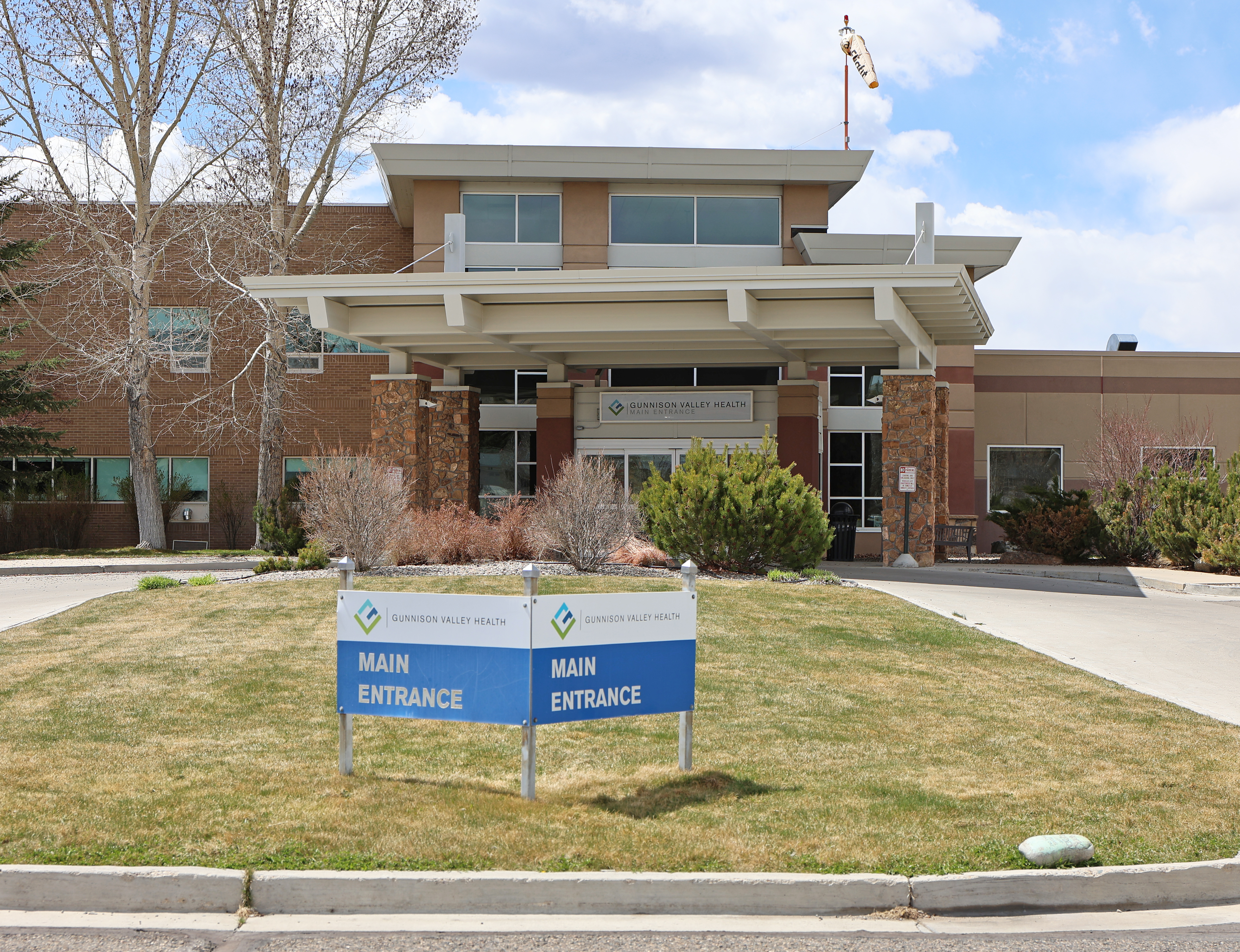
Gunnison Valley Health is a CAH owned and operated by Gunnison County, Colorado

As of July 2025, there were 1,377 certified critical access hospitals in 45 states; Connecticut, Delaware, Maryland, New Jersey and Rhode Island did not have any CAHs.

== Requirements ==
To receive federal funding, critical access hospitals must adhere to several guidelines. They may have no more than 25 beds and must have an average duration of hospital stay under 96 hours. They must also be more than 35 miles from another hospital, with exceptions allowed for areas with poor roads or difficult terrain.

CAHs have more flexibility than other hospitals in staffing requirements. They must offer 24/7 emergency care and have a physician on-call available to be on-site within 60 minutes. They are required to have a registered nurse on site at all times when acutely ill patients are in the hospital.

In most cases, a Doctor of Medicine or Doctor of Osteopathic Medicine, a physician assistant, a nurse practitioner, or a clinical nurse specialist must be available for immediate contact by phone or radio and on-site within 30 minutes, or within 60 minutes in a frontier area or remote location. In CAHs with 10 or fewer beds located in such areas, a registered nurse with training in emergency care may fulfill this role by governor–CMS agreement.

Critical access hospitals must have equipment and medications commonly used in life-saving procedures, and have transfer agreements or arrangements with larger hospitals for patients in need of further care.

Pharmaceutical manufacturers that participate in Medicaid are legally required to sell outpatient drugs to critical access hospitals at discounted prices under the 340B Drug Pricing Program.

Few CAHs provide intensive care treatment. A review of CAHs in the early 2000s counted 26% of the hospitals providing intensive care-level treatment to at least one patient. About two-thirds of these hospitals had a physical intensive care unit, while the remainder provided intensive care treatment in areas of the hospital also treating acute care patients. The mean number of intensive care beds in each hospital was 3.5. Two-thirds of the hospitals providing intensive care treatment staffed these areas with registered nurses only. Most of the hospitals providing intensive care services also provided surgical services.

== Key legislation ==
The program was created with the Balanced Budget Act of 1997, and modified with the Balanced Budget Refinement Act of 1999. The Medicare Prescription Drug, Improvement, and Modernization Act of 2003 increased reimbursement for CAHs to 101% of care costs. The Medicare Improvements for Patients and Providers Act of 2008 expanded grants available to CAHs and further incentivized reimbursement.
