= 2022 Club Q shooting =

Mass shooting in Colorado, U.S.

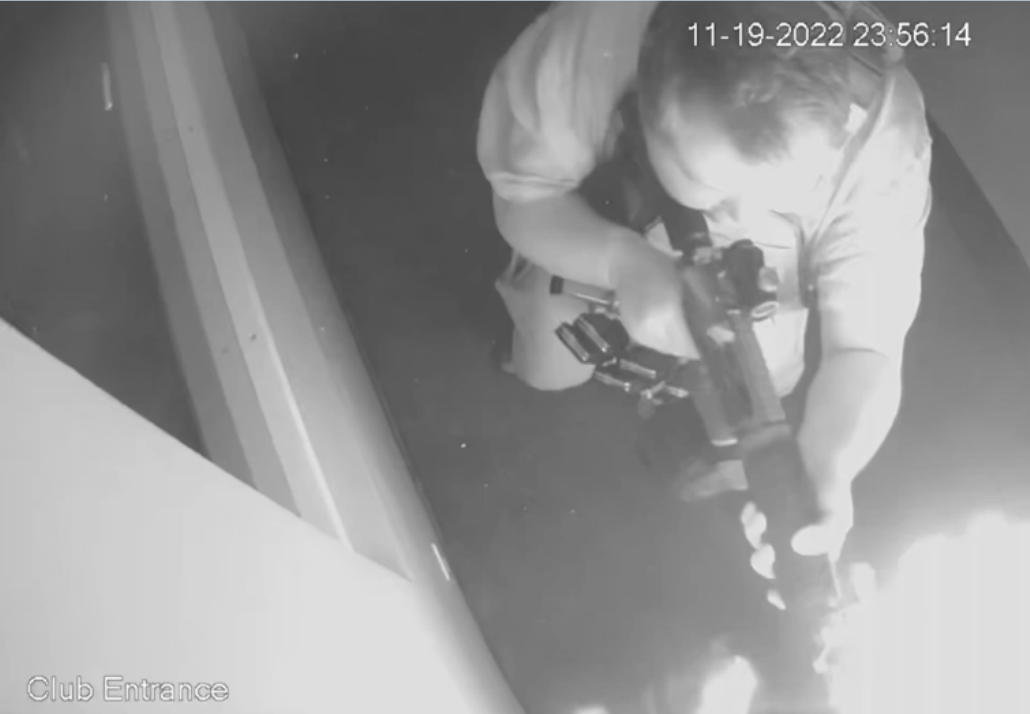
- CCTV still of Aldrich entering Club Q
- Location: Club Q, Colorado Springs, Colorado, U.S.
- Date: November 19–20, 2022 c. 11:56 p.m. – 12:02 a.m. (MST)
- Target: LGBTQ people
- Attack type: Mass shooting; mass murder; spree shooting; hate crime (violence against LGBTQ people); domestic terrorism
- Weapons: AR-15–style rifle (privately made); Glock 17 style handgun (privately made)
- Deaths: 5
- Injuries: 26 (including the perpetrator; 19 by gunfire)
- Perpetrator: Anderson Lee Aldrich
- Defenders: Richard M. Fierro; Thomas James; Drea Norman
- Motive: Anti-LGBTQ extremism
- Verdict: Pleaded guilty
- Convictions: Federal: 74 counts of hate crime and weapons charges; Colorado: First-degree murder (5 counts); Attempted first-degree murder (46 counts); Bias-motivated hate crimes (2 counts)
- Sentence: Federal; Life imprisonment without the possibility of parole plus 190 years Colorado; Five consecutive life sentences without the possibility of parole, plus 2,211 years

On November 19–20, 2022, an anti-LGBTQ–motivated mass shooting occurred at Club Q, a gay bar in Colorado Springs, Colorado, United States. Five people were killed, and 25 others were injured, 19 of them by gunfire. The shooter, 22-year-old Anderson Lee Aldrich, was also injured while being restrained, and was taken to a local hospital. Aldrich was then charged and remanded in custody.

On June 26, 2023, Aldrich pleaded guilty to the shooting and state level charges and was officially sentenced to a total of five consecutive life terms plus an additional consecutive 2,211 years, all without the possibility of parole. On January 16, 2024, Aldrich was additionally charged with 50 federal hate crimes in connection with the shooting. On June 18, 2024, Aldrich pleaded guilty to the federal charges and was sentenced to 55 concurrent life sentences without parole, plus a consecutive 190 years.

== Background ==
Club Q is located at the 3430 block of North Academy Boulevard and opened in 2002. It was for a time the only LGBTQ club in Colorado Springs, Colorado's second-most populous city with a population of just under 500,000. A 2021 article by Denver-based magazine 5280 noted the club to be a place "where LGBTQ folks [went] for drag performances, dance parties, and drinks". The shooting occurred on the eve of the Transgender Day of Remembrance.

Since 2019, Colorado has had a red flag law that allows citizens or law enforcement to petition a court to order the removal of firearms from a potentially dangerous person. Of the 19 states and the District of Columbia with red flag laws, Colorado has among the lowest per capita rates of invocation of the law. In opposition to the Colorado statute, more than half of the state's 64 counties declared themselves Second Amendment sanctuaries, including El Paso County where the shooting occurred. According to the Los Angeles Blade, "It is El Paso County Sheriff's Office's explicit policy not to petition for an Extreme Risk Protection Order (ERPO) or Temporary Risk Protection Order (TRPO) to remove firearms from at-risk people."

== Shooting ==
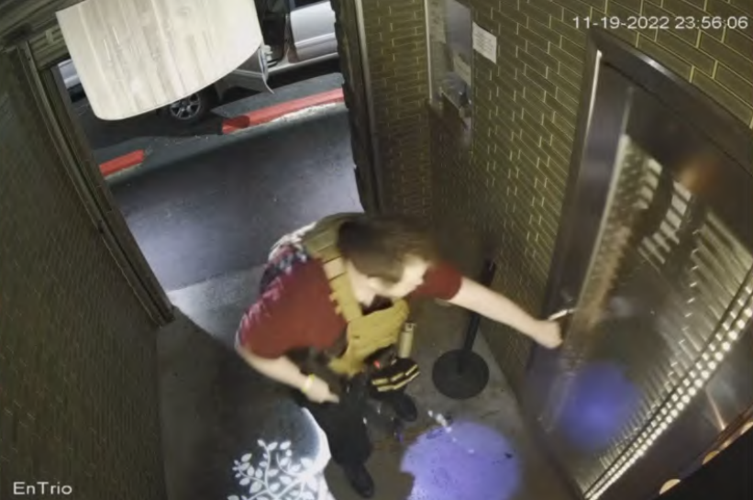
A still of the CCTV footage showing Aldrich entering Club Q

According to the police chief, the shooting began when Anderson Lee Aldrich entered Club Q while a dance party was being held. Wielding an AR-15–style rifle loaded with a 60-round drum magazine, carrying a Polymer80 PF940V2 (Glock 17 style) handgun, multiple magazines of ammunition, and wearing body armor, Aldrich immediately began firing at employees and patrons while moving further into the building. Aldrich entered the building, turned and shot two people in the ticket booth. The surviving victim, who was the door girl, was protected by Daniel Aston, who used his body to cover his coworker. Aldrich rushed to the bar area and opened fire on several victims there, including Kelly Loving, Raymond Green Vance, and Ashley Paugh. Aldrich walked down the ramp to the dance floor and shot more victims before going up the stairs towards the patio. Aldrich opened fire through the patio door and fatally shot Derrick Rump. At this point, Aldrich's rifle was empty and Aldrich began to reload the weapon. Many survivors at first mistook the gunfire for being a part of the music, until the shots continued and the occupants saw the muzzle flashes. Multiple people sheltered behind the bar and in dressing rooms, while others stayed low to the ground.

Thirty-eight seconds after the shooting started, a U.S. Navy petty officer who was trapped in the patio, Thomas James, rushed towards the shooter and grabbed the barrel of their rifle. He struggled with the shooter for the rifle before Aldrich pulled out the handgun and shot James twice in the torso. A club patron, identified as U.S. Army veteran Richard M. Fierro, charged across the room and joined to help James. Aldrich pointed the handgun at Fierro but was unable to fire the gun due to the magazine falling out during the struggle. Fierro then grabbed the handgun from the shooter's hand and used it to hit the shooter repeatedly in the head. Fierro and James continued to fight the shooter. During this time, James successfully grabbed the rifle and slid it across the floor. A transgender woman, Drea Norman, came out of hiding and joined Fierro and James in subduing Aldrich. She stomped on the shooter's head repeatedly in order to keep them down. Fierro estimated the shooter's weight at 300 pounds (140 kg).

Police received an initial call for service regarding the shooting at 11:56 p.m. on November 19, with the first officer being dispatched a minute later. A total of 39 patrol officers from all four divisions of the Colorado Springs Police Department, along with 34 firefighters and 11 ambulances, responded to the scene. The suspect was in custody within about five minutes after the first 9-1-1 call. After the shooting stopped, many were at first reluctant to leave their hiding spots as they were unsure if the shooter was reloading or had been stopped. Fierro, who had been covered in blood, was placed in police custody in a squad car for over an hour before he was cleared of suspicion and released.

The injured were transported to three hospitals: seven to Penrose Hospital, 10 to Memorial Hospital Central, and two to Memorial Hospital North. Some ambulances, with most of them AMR, had to transport up to three patients at a time, and a few police cruisers had to transport victims as well.

== Victims ==
Fatalities

- Daniel Davis Aston, 28
- Kelly Loving, 40
- Ashley Paugh, 35
- Derrick Rump, 38
- Raymond Green Vance, 22

Five people were killed, and 25 others were injured in the shooting, of whom 19 were by gunfire. One of the deceased victims, Daniel Aston, was a bar supervisor and a frequent performer at the nightclub. Another fatality, Raymond Vance, was the boyfriend of Fierro's daughter.

During the press conference, the chief of the Colorado Springs Police Department made a point to say the department respected all community members and that they would be identifying the deceased by the names they and their loved ones used. He then read the names of the deceased victims and included their pronouns.

== Aftermath ==
A vigil was held on November 20 with standing room only at the All Souls Unitarian Church, which was also attended by several members of the Colorado Springs City Council.

Additional memorials and events were held throughout the week, which promoted spaces for people to gather and donate.

Donation drives were set up shortly after the shooting from both local organizations and GoFundMe fundraisers for the victims and their families.

On November 24, Colorado Springs evangelical ministry Focus on the Family was targeted with a graffiti message, reading: "Their blood is on your hands. Five lives taken."

== Perpetrator ==
Anderson Lee Aldrich
- Born: Nicholas Franklin Brink; May 20, 2000 (age 26); San Diego, California, U.S.
- Parent: Aaron Brink (father)
- Relatives: Randy Voepel (maternal grandfather)
- Status: Incarcerated at United States Penitentiary, Big Sandy

The shooter was identified as Anderson Lee Aldrich, a then 22-year-old resident of Colorado Springs. Aldrich was born as Nicholas Franklin Brink on May 20, 2000, in San Diego, California, to Aaron Brink, a former pornographic film actor and mixed martial arts fighter, and Laura Voepel, the daughter of Randy Voepel, a Republican former member of the California State Assembly. Voepel and Brink separated and divorced one year after Aldrich's birth, while Voepel went on to receive custody over Aldrich. Her tumultuous life – which included multiple arrests and mental health evaluations – resulted in Aldrich being cared for by Voepel's mother and stepfather, who eventually became Aldrich's legal guardians.

Aldrich grew up in northern San Antonio, Texas, and is a member of The Church of Jesus Christ of Latter-day Saints, though according to the church, had not been involved in church services for at least a decade. Records indicate that Aldrich was a target of online bullying that involved homophobic taunts while in middle school. A mocking Encyclopedia Dramatica page was created about Aldrich in 2015, a website to which a moderator claims Aldrich had also contributed to. In the aftermath of the shooting, the website issued a statement saying: "It wasn't our fault, we swear!" Aldrich changed names on April 28, 2016, shortly before turning 16, citing a desire to remove associations with their father, who by that point had multiple criminal convictions.

On November 22, 2022, Aldrich's attorneys revealed in court filings that their client identifies as non-binary and uses they/them pronouns, with the filings addressing them as Mx. Aldrich. Experts in online extremism have voiced the possibility that Aldrich's self-identification could be disingenuous, noting Aldrich's online activity prior to the shooting on racist and homophobic trolling websites. A neighbor and former friend of Aldrich alleged that Aldrich had made hateful comments towards the LGBTQ community in the past, including frequent usage of homophobic slurs. He believed that Aldrich claiming to be non-binary was "a total troll on the community, and a total troll on the system." Despite this, the CEO of the Center for Countering Digital Hate said that using they/them pronouns for Aldrich, while acknowledging their past actions and impact on the LGBTQ community, is "the best course of action", believing that it's important to not "play the troll's game."

=== Prior incidents ===
On June 18, 2021, Aldrich's maternal grandparents, with whom Aldrich lived, revealed their plans to sell their house relocate to Florida. Angered at the development, Aldrich complained about losing access to the material stored in the basement which was intended for "conduct[ing] a mass shooting and bombing". Aldrich threatened to kill them, but they were able to flee and call 911 when Aldrich went to the basement. Aldrich then moved to Voepel's home, who fled after Aldrich indicated intent to make a last stand there. During an hour-long standoff with Colorado SWAT, an armed Aldrich live-streamed from inside and threatened to blow up the house. Ten neighboring homes were evacuated in response to the threats. Upon surrendering, a tub filled with explosive-grade material — including ammonium nitrate and tannerite — was recovered alongside handguns, ballistic vests, and gas masks; Aldrich was jailed and charged with multiple counts of kidnapping and felony menacing. Aldrich entered a not guilty plea and was released on bail two weeks later. The case made negligible progress, with Voepel and the grandparents refusing to accept any subpoena (under technical grounds) to avoid testifying against Aldrich. In July 2022, the case was dismissed, and records were sealed a month later.

Twice before the 2021 incident Aldrich had been reported to Colorado Police for "escalating homicidal behavior". On June 17, 2021, Aldrich's grand-aunt contacted the FBI to report Aldrich was planning to kill Christians and government employees after Aldrich's grandfather had reported being threatened by Aldrich; however, the family did not press charges with local police. There is no record that law enforcement authorities or Aldrich's relatives attempted to trigger the Colorado red flag law, which might have allowed for the seizure of any weapons and ammunition that Aldrich possessed.

Aldrich and Laura Voepel had conflicts with passengers and crew during a July 2022 flight from California to Colorado. They were accused of harassing others while aboard the plane and insulting some with racial slurs. After deplaning, Aldrich was filmed saying to another passenger: "I wish I can (sic) shoot all of you" and "You keep following me and I'm going to fuck you up."

=== Social media activity ===
Aldrich had allegedly created a "free speech" website that hosted violent and racist content — including a video that advocated killing civilians to "cleanse society" — as of the night of the shooting. A second site, that was identified as a "brother website" on its homepage, had hosted footage of the 2022 Buffalo shooting, the Christchurch mosque shootings, and on the night of the Club Q shooting, came to display four other videos, including one which apparently showed Aldrich's face reflected in a vehicle's rear view mirror. Testimony from a February 2023 hearing implied that Aldrich had operated a neo-Nazi website prior to the shooting.

== Legal proceedings ==
After the shooting, Aldrich was charged with ten felony counts: five counts of murder, and five counts of committing a bias-motivated crime causing bodily injury. An El Paso County judge authorized the sealing of Aldrich's prior arrest records, saying the public release of the documents could "jeopardize the ongoing investigation". Aldrich was represented by a public defender.

On December 6, Aldrich was charged with 305 criminal counts, which included first-degree murder, attempted first-degree murder, assault of the first and second degree, and hate crimes. District Attorney Michael Allen said it was "probably the most charges that we've ever filed in a single case, on a murder case like this in the state of Colorado". On December 8, a judge ordered the unsealing of court documents pertaining to Aldrich's June 2021 arrest.

On January 13, 2023, Aldrich was charged with new felony offenses for attempted murder and hate crimes. The additional twelve charges raised the total number of criminal counts to 317.

On June 26, Aldrich pleaded guilty to the shooting and was formally sentenced to a total of five consecutive life terms plus an additional 2,211 years in prison, all without any possibility of parole.

On June 18, 2024, Aldrich pleaded guilty to the federal charges and was sentenced to 55 life terms in prison. Aldrich was imprisoned in the Wyoming State Penitentiary, where he was transferred in late 2023. Aldrich was later transferred into the Federal Bureau of Prisons, first to FCI Coleman Medium, and subsequently to USP Big Sandy in Inez, Kentucky.

== Responses and reactions ==
The shooting was condemned by politicians in the immediate aftermath. The then-United States President Joe Biden said, "While no motive in this attack is yet clear, we know that the LGBTQ+ community has been subjected to horrific hate violence in recent years."

Transportation Secretary Pete Buttigieg said that anti-LGBTQ political discourse is partially to blame for the shooting.

The El Paso County government said "We are deeply saddened by the senseless shooting that occurred early this morning in Colorado Springs at Club Q" and they sent their condolences and support to the victims and families.

Colorado's red flag law and its application were scrutinized by advocates of gun violence prevention, politicians, and many other people.

Colorado Governor Jared Polis, who is also Colorado and the nation's first openly gay governor, said "We are eternally grateful for the brave individuals who blocked the [shooter] likely saving lives in the process" and called for an examination of the application of Colorado's red flag law by Colorado's sheriffs.

Colorado Springs Mayor John Suthers said law enforcement should've taken advantage of the law under appropriate circumstances, while cautioning against jumping to conclusions about the application of the law to the shooting.

Colorado state Representative Tom Sullivan, whose son (Alex Sullivan), was killed in the 2012 Aurora theater shooting and sponsor of the state's red flag law said the prior incident should have alerted the community.

Jeffrey Swanson, a professor at Duke University School of Medicine who studies red flag laws, said Colorado's law could have been invoked.

LGBTQ groups have widely memorialized the victims, and linked the mass shooting to recent rhetoric.

Club Q said on social media that it was "devastated by the senseless attack on our community" and that it offered condolences to the victims and their families.

The co-owners of Club Q attributed the shooting to a different kind of anti-LGBTQ hatred, inflamed by some Republican politicians and right-wing influencers and rooted in the demonization of drag queens as "groomers".

Some have cited Colorado Springs' role as the "Evangelical Vatican" — recent home to numerous local, regional and major national Evangelical organizations, many of whom had strongly denounced LGBTQ+ people and/or their sexual choices — as a formative environment contributing to the massacre.

Democrats have also been criticized by some for historically not doing enough to counteract anti-trans narratives, and generally being reluctant to proactively defend the transgender community.

The Church of Jesus Christ of Latter-day Saints released a statement condemning the shooting. The statement read, in part, "The senseless act of violence in Colorado Springs is of great sadness and concern to us. We are greatly troubled by any violence in our communities and condemn most especially violent acts that are the result of intolerance..."

In their responses to the shooting, several far-right media pundits promoted the LGBTQ grooming conspiracy theory, as well as perpetuating moral panic.

Conservative media personality and political commentator Tucker Carlson displayed a banner on his Fox News program Tucker Carlson Tonight that read "Stop Sexualizing Kids" while later hosting a guest who said that mass shootings would keep happening "until we end this evil agenda that is attacking children".

YouTube political commentator and podcast host Tim Pool responded by criticizing the venue's drag show performances, saying, "We shouldn't tolerate pedophiles grooming kids. Club Q had a grooming event"; while other right-wing and conservative political commentators such as Matt Walsh, Candace Owens, Chaya Raichik, and Representative Marjorie Taylor Greene all continued to publish content targeting LGBTQ people, some of which focused specifically on the Colorado area.

After issuing a statement in which she offered her prayers to those affected by the shooting and called for the lawless violence to end, Representative Lauren Boebert (R-CO) was accused of hypocrisy based on her history of anti-LGBTQ rhetoric. Her past comments have included false grooming narratives and the litter boxes in schools hoax. She has been criticized for blocking gun control laws.

Jenna Ellis, a former lawyer for Donald Trump, was criticized for saying that the five people killed during the shooting were "now reaping the consequences of ... eternal damnation" because she claimed that there was "no evidence" the victims were Christian.

Far-right provocateurs, including Jack Posobiec, questioned Richard Fierro's presence at the drag show, while others on the far-right called Fierro a "groomer" and a "faggot" simply because he and his family were at Club Q. Analysis published by the Institute for Strategic Dialogue has estimated that online usage of the terms 'pedophile' and 'groomer' increased sharply in the days following the shooting, as part of far-right and neo-Nazi celebration of, and apologia for, the mass shooting.

The Department of Homeland Security also reported in a bulletin published on November 30 that online extremists praised the actions of the shooter. A significant rise in homophobic and transphobic posts following the shooting have been tracked by LGBTQ advocates both in far-right forums such as Gab and even in more mainstream social media platforms such as Twitter, Facebook, and YouTube.

On December 14, 2022, several survivors of the mass shooting presented their testimony to the United States House Committee on Oversight and Reform. The witnesses placed blame for the attack on hateful rhetoric, calling it the direct cause of the shooting, and also warned of the dangers of hate speech, saying that it is damaging even in the absence of explicit calls for violence.

At the hearing, Club Q owner Matthew Haynes pushed back at Republican politicians, saying: "I know that we, our Club Q community, are in the thoughts and prayers of so many of you. Unfortunately these thoughts and prayers alone are not saving lives. They're not changing the rhetoric of hate." Haynes also read aloud examples from some of the hundreds of the hateful messages received following the shooting, including one that said "the shooter was doing God's work".

Survivor James Slaugh said that LGBTQ issues should not be politicized, and urged respect for basic human rights: "Outside of these spaces, we are continually being dehumanized, marginalized and targeted. The fear-based and hateful rhetoric surrounding the LGBTQ+ community, especially around trans individuals and drag performers, leads to violence."

== See also ==
- 2020s anti-LGBTQ movement in the United States – Political backlash against LGBTQ people
- 2022 Bratislava shooting – Attack in Bratislava, Slovakia
- 2022 Oslo shooting – Mass shooting in Norway
- List of mass shootings in the United States in 2022
- List of people killed for being transgender
- List of shootings in Colorado
- Pulse nightclub shooting – 2016 mass shooting in Florida, U.S.
- Tel Aviv gay centre shooting – 2009 shooting at an Israeli gay centre that resulted in two deaths
- UpStairs Lounge arson attack – 1973 arson attack on a gay bar in New Orleans
- Violence against LGBTQ people
