= Elizabeth Concordia =

President of UCHealth

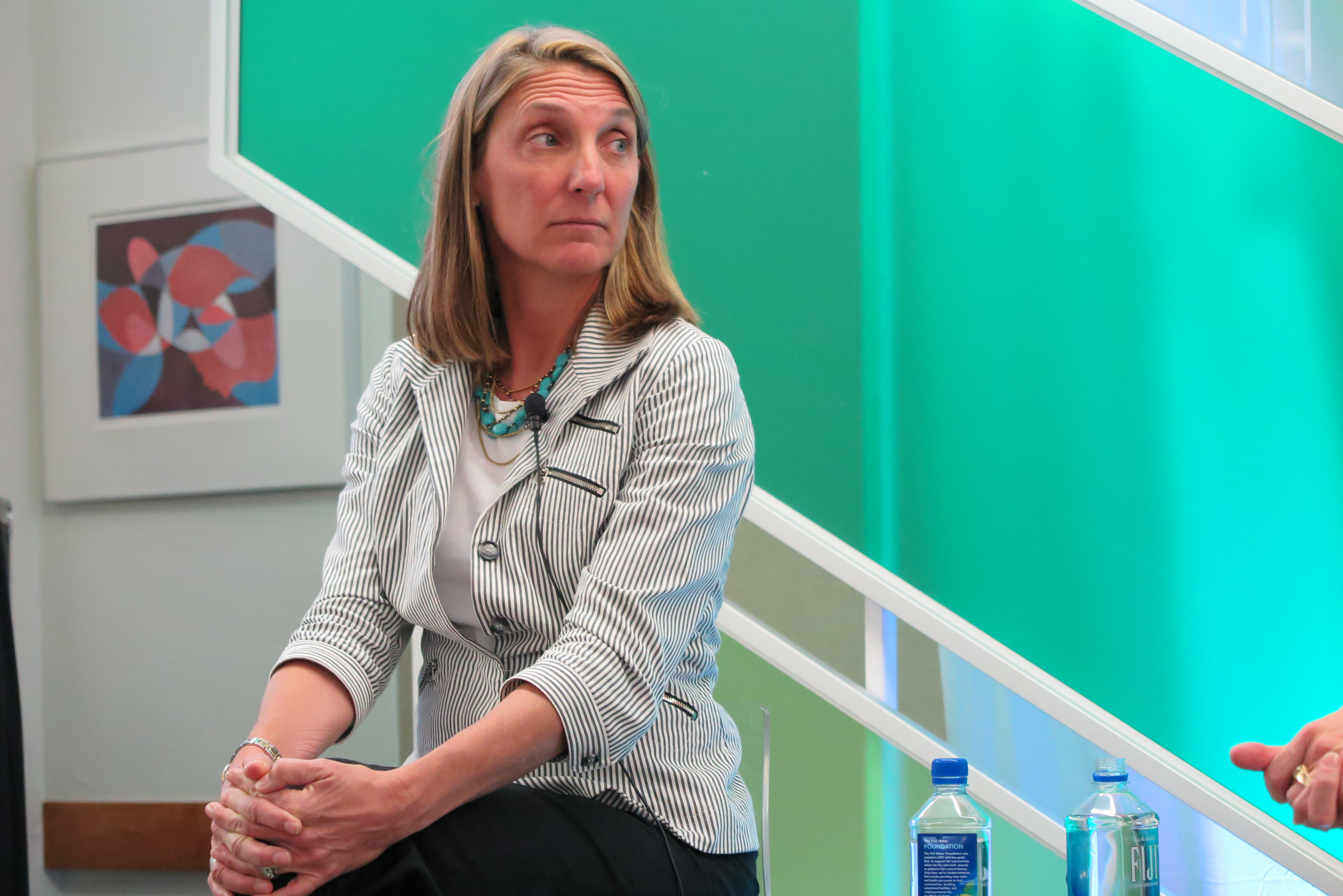

CEO and President of UCHealth
- Incumbent
- Assumed office August 2014

Personal details
- Spouse: Michael Concordia
- Children: Alexis Concordia, Michael Concordia, Erica Concordia
- Education: Duke University B.A., Johns Hopkins University MHA
- Profession: health administration

Elizabeth Concordia is the CEO and President of UCHealth. In her position she manages the University of Colorado Hospital Authority and Poudre Valley Health System.

Previously she was the first female CEO of the University of Pittsburgh Medical Center Presbyterian Shadyside Hospital.

Concordia holds a Bachelor of Arts in Economics and German from Duke University and a Master of Administrative Science Management from Johns Hopkins University.
