= Laurie E. Gaspar =

- Education: University of Western Ontario (MD); University of Michigan (MBA)
- Scientific career
- Fields: Radiation oncology
- Workplaces: University of Colorado

Laurie E. Gaspar is a professor emerita in the department of radiation oncology at the University of Colorado School of Medicine. She specializes in lung cancer and brain tumors.

== Education ==
In 1982, Gaspar received her MD from the University of Western Ontario. She graduated a few months later than her class as a result of taking maternity leave. To fill the gap between receiving her degree and the next cycle of internships, she began doing research on cancer. She then completed a residency in radiation oncology at the University of Western Ontario.

In 2004, she completed an Master of Business Administration from the University of Michigan.

== Career ==
Gaspar is a professor emerita in the department of radiation oncology at the University of Colorado School of Medicine. She was formerly the chair of the department.

Gaspar served as the 2019–2020 treasurer for the American Society of Clinical Oncology. She is a board member for the International Society for the Study of Lung Cancer.
