= Ruth Kempe =

American physician

Ruth Kempe (October 11, 1921 – July 24, 2009) was an American pediatrician and child psychiatrist. She spent most of her career doing clinical research on child abuse and co-founded The Kempe Center in 1972.

== Biography ==
Ruth Irene Svibergson was born on October 11, 1921, in Norwood, Massachusetts, to Emil and Aina Svibergson. She studied at Radcliffe College and Yale School of Medicine. After meeting C. Henry Kempe during her pediatrics residency at Yale New Haven Hospital, the couple married in 1948.

Kempe served on the faculty at University of Colorado School of Medicine beginning in 1961, first as an assistant clinical professor of pediatrics, and later as an assistant professor of psychiatry and pediatrics. She spent most of her career doing clinical research on child abuse and co-founded [The Kempe Center in 1972.

== Published works ==
- Healthy Babies, Happy Parents (coauthor, 1958)
- The Battered Child (coauthor, 1968)
- Child Abuse (coauthor, 1978)
- The Common Secret: Sexual Abuse of Children and Adolescents (coauthor, 1984)
