= The Kempe Award =

- Awarded for: Work in prevention of child abuse and neglect.
- Presented by: International Society for the Prevention of Child Abuse and Neglect
- First award: 1985

The Kempe Award, established in 1984 and first awarded in 1985, is presented every two years to "an outstanding young professional or organization working in any discipline in the field of child abuse and neglect." Since 1986, it has been presented by the International Society for the Prevention of Child Abuse and Neglect. The award is named after C. Henry Kempe, a pioneer in the identification of child abuse.

== Award recipients ==
- 1985 – James Garbarino (USA)
- 1986 – George W. Brown (USA)
- 1988 – Philista Onyango (Kenya)
- 1990 – NEWPIN New Parent-Infant Network (England)
- 1992 – PANIAMOR (Costa Rica)
- 1994 – National Movement of Street Children in Brazil (Brazil)
- 1996 – The Center for Children's Rights (Thailand)
- 1998 – Indian Council for Child Welfare (India)
- 2000 – Patricia Ip (Hong Kong)
- 2002 – Jordan River Foundation (Jordan)
- 2004 – Heather Taussig (USA)
- 2006 – Fu-Yong Jiao (China)
- 2008 – Vidya Reddy (India)
- 2010 – John Leventhal, MD (USA)
- 2012 – R. Kim Oates (Australia)
- 2014 – R. Kim Oates (Australia)
- 2016 – David Finkelhor (USA), Pooja Taparia (India), Franziska Meinck (England)
