= Maurice H. Rees =

American medical educator

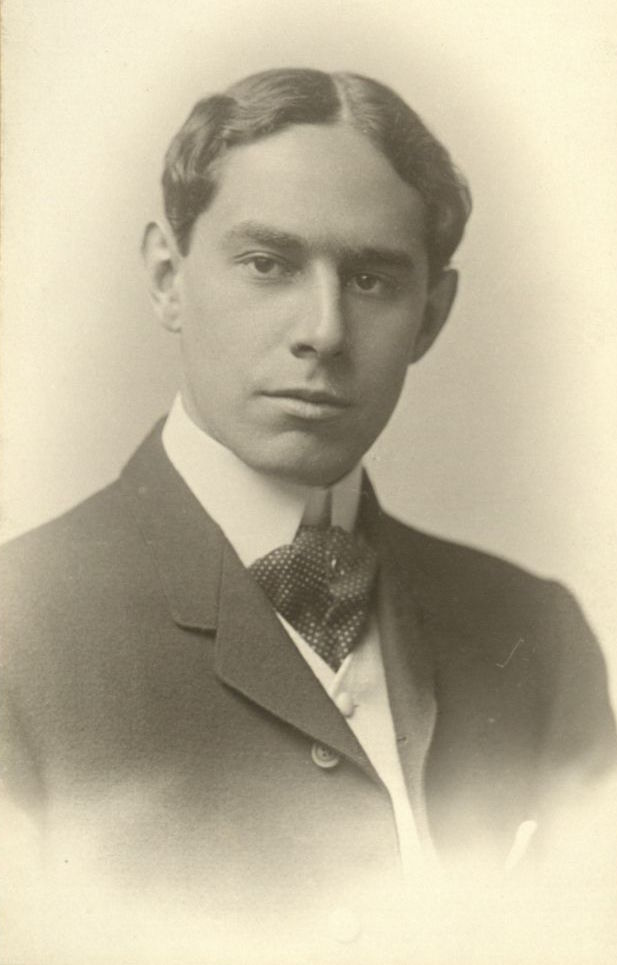
- Born: April 27, 1880; Newton, Iowa
- Died: May 25, 1945 (aged 65); Denver, Colorado
- Education: Monmouth College (A.B.); University of Illinois (A.M.); University of Chicago (Ph.D); Washington University in St. Louis (M.D.)
- Occupations: University Dean; Hospital Superintendent
- Spouse: Elizabeth M. Prather (married 1911)
- Children: a son

Maurice Holmes Rees (April 27, 1880 – May 25, 1945) was an American medical educator who served as Dean of the University of Colorado School of Medicine and Superintendent of the University of Colorado Hospital from 1920 to 1945.

== Early life and education ==
Maurice Holmes Rees was born on April 27, 1880, in Newton, Iowa, to Spencer Harris Rees and Margaret Holmes. He attended Newton High School and served in the Iowa National Guard from 1889 to 1901, where he was honorably discharged.

He earned a Bachelor's of Arts degree at Monmouth College in 1904 and a Master's of Arts at the University of Illinois Urbana-Champaign in 1905. Rees earned a Doctor of Philosophy degree from the University of Chicago in 1917 and a Doctor of Medicine from Washington University School of Medicine in 1921.

== Academic career ==
Rees held a multitude of academic positions throughout his career. He served as a professor of natural science at York College (Nebraska) (1905–1906), a professor of biology at Tarkio College (1906–1914), an assistant professor in physiology at the University of Kansas (1914–1916) assistant professor in physiology at the University of Chicago (1916–1917) and a physiology professor at the University of South Dakota (1917–1921).

From there he would join the University of Colorado Boulder as professor of physiology and pharmacology in 1921. He would go on to become head of the school's Department of Physiology and later dean at the University of Colorado School of Medicine in 1925. He would hold that position for 20 years until his death in 1945.

For a year he served as president of the Association of American Medical Colleges (1930–1931).

Rees was a member of the American Medical Association, the American College of Hospital Administrators, the American Physiological Society and the Denver Clinical and Pathological Society.

== Select publications ==
- The Influence of Pituitary Extracts on the Daily Output of Urine (January 22, 1918), The American Journal of Physiology
- The Influence of Pituitary Extracts on the Absorption of Water from the Small Intestine (May 12, 1920), The American Journal of Physiology
- The Use of Pituitary Extracts by Mouth in the Treatment if Diabetes Insipidus (January, 1922) Endocrinology: The Bulletin of the Association for the Society of Internal Secretions
- Relation of Physiology to Clinical Medicine (September 7, 1929), The Journal of the American Medical Association
- Effect of Digestive Enzymes on Pituitary Extract Action (June 1, 1923), The American Journal of Physiology

== Personal life ==
Rees was married to Elizabeth M. Prather on June 21, 1911, in Tarkio, Missouri. The couple had one son together, Maurice Prather Rees.

== Death and legacy ==
Rees died from coronary artery disease at the age of 64 on May 25, 1945, in Denver, Colorado. His body was cremated at Fairmount Crematorium and his ashes given to his wife, Elizabeth.

In his honor, the Regents of the University of Colorado established the Dean Maurice H. Rees Scholarship Fund. The scholarship is to be awarded to a single student each year who is entering the junior class of the school of medicine and "has shown, in addition to excellent scholarship during his first two years, those fine qualities of character and conscientious devotion to duty manifested by Dean Rees during his life time".
