= Kim Oates =

Australian paediatrician and medical educator

- Born: Ronald Kim Oates
- Occupations: Paediatrician, medical educator, author
- Employer: University of Sydney
- Known for: Child protection, medical education, child health
- Title: Emeritus Professor, University of Sydney
- Awards: Officer of the Order of Australia (2020)

Academic background
- Education: University of Sydney

Academic work
- Discipline: Paediatrics
- Institutions: The Children's Hospital at Westmead, University of Sydney

Ronald Kim Oates is an Australian paediatrician, medical educator, and author. He is an Emeritus Professor at the University of Sydney and a former Chief Executive of The Children's Hospital at Westmead. He is noted for his work in child health, medical education, and child protection.

He was a recipient of an Officer of the Order of Australia (AO) in the 2020 Queen's Birthday Honours.

== Early life and education ==
Oates completed his medical degree at the University of Sydney and later specialised in paediatrics. His professional interests expanded to include medical education and healthcare quality improvement, with a focus on child safety and protection. Child protection was longstanding area of Oates clinical and research work. In the later part of his career, his research and professional activities increasingly focused on medical education and patient safety.

== Career ==
Oates began his career as a practising paediatrician before being appointed the foundation Professor of the Douglas Burrows Chair of Paediatrics and Child Health at the University of Sydney in 1985. He became an advocate for child abuse and integrate child protection education into medical training programs.

He was Chief Executive of The Children's Hospital at Westmead (formerly the Royal Alexandra Hospital for Children), where he was involved in initiatives to improve open communication and to develop a strong culture of research. After retiring from clinical and executive roles, he remained active in medical education in the Faculty of Medicine at the University of Sydney. At the request of the Clinical Excellence Commission of New South Wales, he developed a course to teach medical students to improve patient safety by reducing medical error, teaching this course in four medical schools.

Before joining the University of Sydney, Oates established a community unit in 1974 to provide care of children with development disabilities. The unit brought together hospital based clinical services, community support, family involvement and special education. His clinical and research interestes included child development, child behaviour and child abuse.

At the Children Hospital at Camperdown and later Westmead, Oates held serveral positions, including Head of Community Paediatics, Head of the Children Protection unit, Head of Child Development and Director of Medical Services. He also served as Chief Executive of the Children Hospital at Westmead from 1997 to 2006.

== Research and contributions ==
Oates has published extensively on topics related to child abuse and child health. His publications include articles on recognising child abuse, memory in children, medical leadership, and communication in medical practice.

He has also worked to promote a culture of safety in healthcare, encouraging transparency, learning from medical errors, and improving outcomes for patients.

== Achievements and recognition ==
In 1974, Oates established Australia’s first community paediatric unit with an emphasis on caring for children with developmental disabilities. This initiative brought together teaching hospital clinical care, community support, family partnerships, and special education under a single banner.

Oates is internationally recognised as a child advocate, particularly for his pioneering research in child protection. His research in this area began at a time when it was a taboo subject, and his studies on the long-term effects of child abuse have been influential on an international level. For his pioneering research, Oates was awarded two research doctorates from the University of Sydney: an MD and a DSc.

Additionally, his work on the effects of deep hypothermia on the brain during cardiac surgery in children led to a reduction in the use of this technique. Oates has authored over 200 peer-reviewed papers, written or edited 15 books, and contributed numerous book chapters, reviews, editorials, and opinion pieces.

Internationally, Oates has held several prestigious roles, including President of the International Society for the Prevention of Child Abuse and Neglect and Councillor for Defence for Defence for Children International. In 1993, he was Director of the Kempe National Center for the Prevention of Child Abuse and Neglect in Denver, USA.

In Australia, his leadership roles have included inaugural Chair of the National Council for the Prevention of Child Abuse and Neglect, Board Chair of the National Association for the Prevention of Child Abuse and Neglect, and Chair of the NSW Child Death Review Team. He has received numerous national and international awards, including the New College Lecturer and Medal, the Henry Kempe International Lectureship, the Nathalie Masse International Prize for Research into Childhood, the Howard Williams Medal for Outstanding Contributions to Paediatrics and Child Health in Australasia, and the People’s Health Medal for his contributions to health in Vietnam.

In 2013, Oates received an Honorary Doctorate of Science from Western Sydney University for his contributions to paediatrics and advocacy for child welfare.

In 2020, Oates was made an Officer of the Order of Australia (AO), in recognition of his contributions to paediatrics, child protection, and medical education. He holds professorial positions at three Australian universities, as well as in China and Vietnam.

== Selected publications ==
- Oates, R.K. (1996). The Spectrum of Child Abuse: Assessment, Treatment and Prevention. Brunner-Mazel, New York.
- Cohn Donnelly, A., and Oates, K. (Eds.) (2000). Classic Papers in Child Abuse. Sage Publications, Beverly Hills.
- Oates, K. (2014). 20 Tips for Parents. Finch Publications, Sydney. (also translated into Czech)

== Selected papers ==
- Oates, R.K., Simpson, J.M., Cartmill, T.B., and Turnbull, J. (1995). Intellectual function and age of repair in cyanotic congenital heart disease. Archives of Disease in Childhood, 72: 298–301.
- Oates, R.K., Simpson, J.M., Turnbull, J., and Cartmill, T. (1995). The relationship between intelligence and duration of cardiac arrest with deep hypothermia. The Journal of Thoracic and Cardiovascular Surgery, 110: 786–792.
- Lyons, T., and Oates, R.K. (1993). Falling out of bed – a relatively benign occurrence. Pediatrics, 92: 125–127.
- Oates, R.K., Peacock, A., and Forrest, D.F. (1985). Long-Term Effects of Non-organic Failure to Thrive. Pediatrics, 75: 36–40.
- Hufton, I.W., and Oates, R.K. (1977). Non-organic failure to thrive: A long-term follow-up. Pediatrics, 59: 73–77.
- Oates, K. (2012). The new clinical leader. Journal of Paediatrics and Child Health, 48: 472–477.
- Oates, K., Burgess, A., Clark, T. (2022). An interdisciplinary program for emerging leaders in patient safety. Clinical Teacher, 2022: 1–10.
