= Edward Neuwelt =

American neurologist and neurosurgeon

- Education: University of Colorado School of Medicine, University of Texas Southwestern Medical School
- Known for: Research on the blood-brain barrier and the treatment of brain tumors
- Scientific career
- Fields: Neurology, Neurosurgery
- Workplaces: Oregon Health & Science University, Portland Veterans Affairs Medical Center

Edward Neuwelt was an American professor of neurology and neurosurgery at Oregon Health & Science University (OHSU) and the Portland Veterans Affairs Medical Center. He died on 10 February 2026. He is known for his research on the blood-brain barrier and the development of new treatments for brain tumors.

== Education and career ==
Neuwelt received his medical degree from the University of Colorado School of Medicine in Denver and completed his residency in neurosurgery at the University of Texas Southwestern Medical School in Dallas, Texas. He then completed research fellowships in neuro-oncology and neurosurgery at the National Cancer Institute, National Institutes of Health, and then another at Queen Square Hospital in London, England.

Neuwelt joined OHSU in 1981 as an assistant professor of neurology and neurosurgery. He became a full professor in 1990. He also holds a joint appointment at the Portland Veterans Affairs Medical Center, where he directs the Blood-Brain Barrier Program.

== Research ==
Neuwelt's research has focused on developing new treatments for brain tumors, including the use of chemotherapy. He has also studied the blood-brain barrier, a protective barrier that prevents many drugs from reaching the brain. Neuwelt has developed techniques for temporarily opening the blood-brain barrier to allow drugs to reach brain tumors more effectively.

== Later research ==
In the later years of his research career, Neuwelt focused on the use of iron oxide nanoparticles to diagnose central nervous system inflammatory diseases and primary central nervous system lymphoma. He also led the development and clinical trials of a new method to protect children from high-frequency hearing loss caused by chemotherapy treatment of pediatric tumors, using sodium thiosulfate.

His research resulted in the successful licensure of sodium thiosulfate by the Food and Drug Administration in 2023, making it the first drug approved to prevent hearing loss in children receiving cisplatin chemotherapy.

== Publications ==
Neuwelt has published over 400 peer-reviewed articles, book chapters, and reviews on his research topics. He has also edited several books on the blood-brain barrier and its manipulation.

Some of his most cited publications include:

- Neuwelt, E. A., Lewy, A. J. (1983). Disappearance of plasma melatonin after removal of a neoplastic pineal gland. New England Journal of Medicine, 308(19), 1132–1135. doi:10.1056/nejm198305123081905
- Neuwelt, E. A., Barnett, P. A., Bigner, D. D., Frenkel, E. P. (1984). Effects of adrenal cortical steroids and osmotic blood-brain barrier opening on methotrexate delivery to gliomas in the rodent: the factor of the blood-brain barrier. Proceedings of the National Academy of Sciences, 81(19), 6034–6038. doi:10.1073/pnas.79.14.4420
- Neuwelt, E. A., Hill, S. A., Frenkel, E. P., Barnett, P. A., McCormick, C. I., Kroll, R. A., ... & Rapoport, S. I. (1991). Osmotic blood-brain barrier disruption and chemotherapy in the treatment of high grade malignant glioma: patient series and literature review. Neurosurgery, 29(5), 622–632. doi:10.1007/bf00172455
- Neuwelt, E., Abbott, N. J., Abrey, L., Banks, W. A., Blakley, B., Davis, T., ... & Weiss, N. (2008). Strategies to advance translational research into brain barriers The Lancet Neurology, 7(1), 84–96. doi:10.1016/s1474-4422(07)70326-5

== Awards and honors ==
Neuwelt has received several awards and honors for his research and teaching, including:

- The Jacob Javits Neuroscience Investigator Award from the National Institutes of Health (1987)
- The Grass Award for Meritorious Research in Neurological Science from the American Neurological Association (1991)
- The Distinguished Alumnus Award from the University of Denver (1994)
- The Farber Award from the Society for Neuro-Oncology (2008)
- The Lifetime Achievement Award from the International Brain Barriers Society (2014)

He is also a fellow of the American Academy of Neurology and the American Association for the Advancement of Science.
