= UC Health =

UC Health may refer to:

- University of California Health (disambiguation)
- University of Cincinnati Health
- University of Colorado Health
- University of Chicago Medical Center
