= UCHealth Parkview Medical Center =

Hospital in Pueblo, Colorado, U.S.

- UCHealth
- The hospital's main entrance (2026)

Geography
- Location: 400 West Sixteenth Street, Pueblo, Colorado, United States
- Coordinates: 38.282°N 104.612°W

Organization
- Type: acute

Services
- Emergency department: Level III trauma center
- Beds: 266

Helipads
- Helipad: (FAA LID: CO71)

History
- Founded: 1923

Links
- Website: www.uchealth.org/locations/uchealth-parkview-medical-center/
- Lists: Hospitals in the United States

UCHealth Parkview Medical Center is an acute hospital in Pueblo, Colorado, U.S. A non-profit hospital, it has 266 staffed beds. The hospital is a Level III trauma center. As of 2024, the hospital is the largest employer in the city of Pueblo, with 3,000 employees.

== History ==
Parkview Medical Center began with a small hospital preceding it, being located at the Clark Spring Water sanitarium in the Grove neighborhood, specializing in selling mineral water. The disastrous Pueblo 1921 flood led to the closure of this small hospital despite the original building's survival.

In 1923, a group of doctors from the former hospital grouped to form the modern Parkview Hospital, located at 17th Street and Grand Avenue, being in a small house. It is named after the nearby Mineral Palace Park. There was a large residence and a cottage adjacent to the hospital, equipped 30 patients, an X-ray machine, and a bathroom on each floor, with the top floor being a nurses' dormitory.

The hospital began to grow, the first unit of the modern day building being finished in 1926 and an additional wing being finished 4 years after. A 2-story nurses' residence with classrooms was also built.

The hospital was eventually given to the Episcopal Diocese of Colorado in 1948 and the hospital renamed to Parkview Episcopal Hospital. Later, a western wing was built in 1950 adding 150 more beds to the hospital. Further expansions took place, with the North Annex being finished in 1970 with 92 beds.

In 1990, multi-million dollar construction began, and added a three-floor surgery wing in 1990, renovations to the main entrance, admissions, ICU, rehab, and post partum in 1991, and finally, three floors added to the surgery wing, as well as a new oncology unit, ICU, cardiac cathaderization lab, and a new OB unit in 1996.

In 1993, Parkview Medical center was named a Level III trauma center.

In 1997, further construction began on a $7.3 million dollar expansion to build offices and parking at the former location of Thatcher School, including the construction of a 350-space parking lot and a overhead pedestrian crossing from the main building to the new offices.

In 2023, construction on the Parkview Cancer Center was completed, which is a 45,000-square-foot (4,200 m^{2}) building that includes a Varian EDGE linear accelerator.

On December 1, 2023, Parkview Medical Center and Parkview Pueblo West Hospital merged with the UCHealth health care system.

== Graduate medical education ==
The hospital operates a number of residency and fellowship programs. Each program is accredited by the Accreditation Council for Graduate Medical Education (ACGME). Fellowships include pulmonary/critical care, gastroenterology, and cardiology.
