= International Society for the Prevention of Child Abuse and Neglect =

International organization

Founded in 1977, the International Society for Prevention of Child Abuse and Neglect (ISPCAN) is a multidisciplinary international organization that aims to prevent and treat child abuse, neglect and exploitation globally. It organizes the International Congress on Child Abuse and Neglect, the largest conference in the world about child abuse.

== See also ==
- C. Henry Kempe
- The Kempe Center
- Children's Hospital (Aurora, Colorado)
- Childline South Africa
