= UCHealth Yampa Valley Medical Center =

- UCHealth
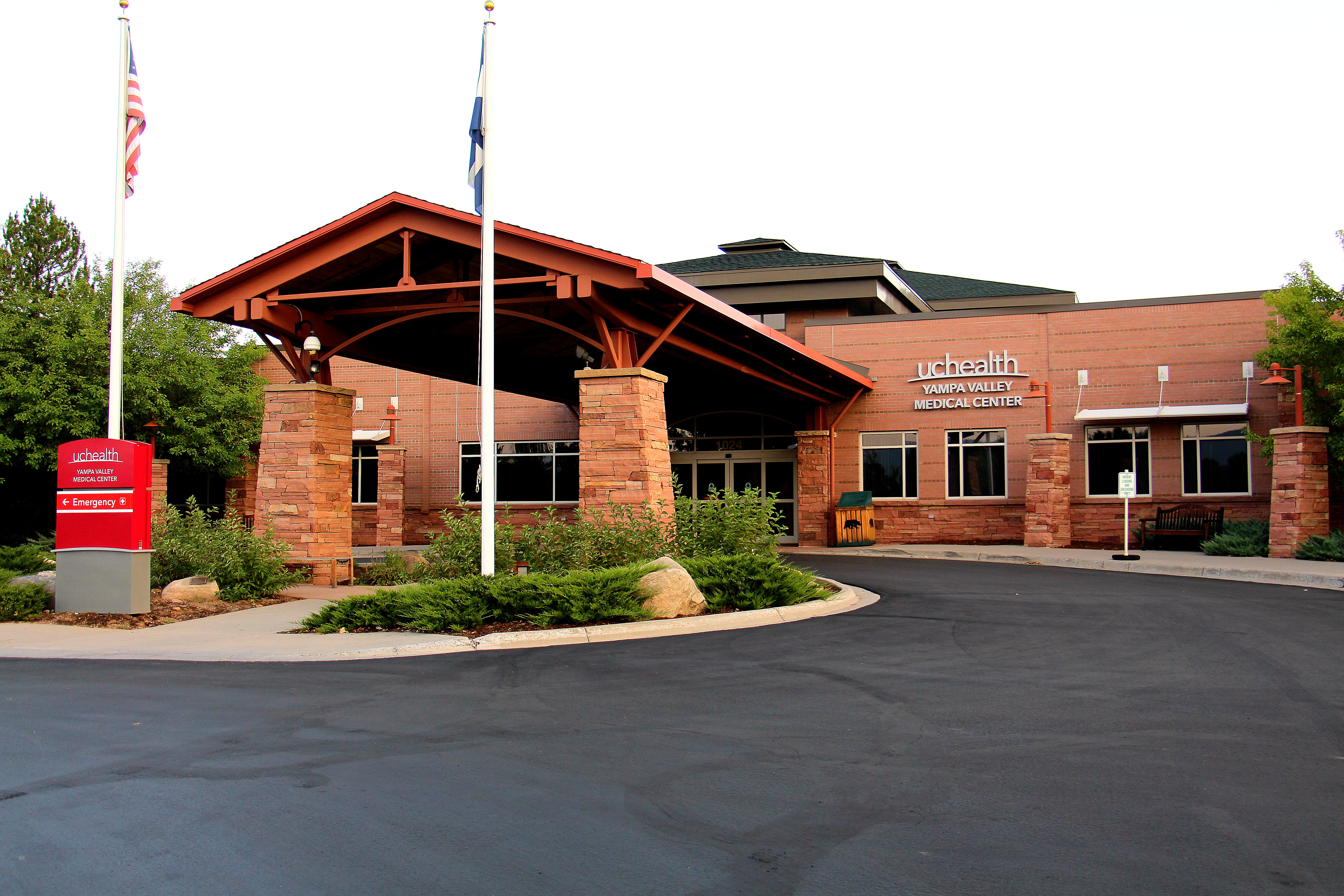

Geography
- Location: 1024 Central Park Drive, Steamboat Springs, Colorado, United States
- Coordinates: 40°27′47.59″N 106°48′53.26″W

Organization
- Type: General

Services
- Emergency department: Level III trauma center
- Beds: 39

History
- Founded: 1946

Links
- Website: www.uchealth.org/locations/uchealth-yampa-valley-medical-center/
- Lists: Hospitals in Colorado

UCHealth Yampa Valley Medical Center (YVMC) is a 39-bed non-profit acute care hospital in Steamboat Springs, Colorado. The medical center is part of the non-profit UCHealth (University of Colorado Health) health care system and serves the residents of northwest Colorado. YVMC's services include a birth center; ear, nose and throat clinic; endocrinology; breast care center; heart and vascular clinic and cardiac rehabilitation; cancer center; emergency including Level III trauma center; rehabilitation including physical, occupational and speech therapies; laboratory, nutrition services, orthopedics, pharmacy, pulmonary rehabilitation, radiology and surgical care. The hospital is a level III trauma center.

== History ==
Although the present campus was opened in 1999, its roots trace back to 1914 and Frederic E. Willett, M.D., who was involved with Steamboat Springs’ first public hospital. In 1946, the Steamboat Springs Hospital Association's board selected the location for The Routt County Memorial Hospital, which opened in 1950.

In 1999, the hospital moved to a different location and changed its name to Yampa Valley Medical Center. In 2001, the Yampa Valley Medical Center Foundation was formed to help fund YVMC's programs and services. An expansion and renovation project was completed in 2009 that increased the size of the Family Birth Place to 10 rooms from five and added both a digital mammography suite and also a minor procedure area. Yampa Valley Medical Center opened the Jan Bishop Cancer Center in 2017. Later that year, it joined the UCHealth System and became UCHealth Yampa Valley Medical Center. In June, 2019, Soniya Fidler was appointed by UCHealth as president of Yampa Valley Medical Center.
