= John H. Sampson =

John Howard Sampson is an American neurosurgeon and University of Colorado School of Medicine Dean and Vice Chancellor for Health Affairs for CU Anschutz who was formerly chief of the department of neurosurgery at Duke University where he serves as a professor of surgery, biomedical engineering, immunology, and pathology.

== Education ==
- B.Sc., University of Manitoba 1986
- MD, University of Manitoba Faculty of Medicine, 1990
- PhD, Neuro-Oncology, Duke University Medical Center, 1994-1996
- Residency: Neurosurgery, Duke University Medical Center, 1991-1998
- Fellowship: Neurological Intensive Care, Duke University Medical Center, 1998
- MHSc, Duke University, 2007
- MBA, Duke University Fuqua School of Business, 2011

== Work and research ==
Sampson has written nearly 300 peer-reviewed papers, including a paper in Nature on his clinical trial on the treatment of glioblastoma patients and another in how tetanus toxoid and CCL3 improve dendritic cell vaccines in mice and glioblastoma patients. Sampson has also held the distinction of being the highest National Institutes of Health funded investigator. He is a member of the National Academy of Medicine and the Association of American Physicians.

== Clinical interests ==
Newly diagnosed or recurrent primary or metastatic brain tumors, including enrollment in clinical trials of new therapeutic agents (especially oncolytic poliovirus therapy, immunotherapy, vaccines and convection-enhanced delivery); posterior fossa tumors, such as acoustic neuromas or meningiomas; microsurgery for tic douloureux or trigeminal neuralgia, including microvascular decompression; microvascular decompression for hemifacial spasm, pituitary tumors, complex skull-base tumors; radiosurgery; evaluation and surgery for patients with the full spectrum of other neurosurgery pathologies.

== Academic leadership ==
Sampson was selected as the Dean and Vice Chancellor for Health Affairs in May 2024.

== Media ==
Sampson has appeared on 60 Minutes and many other news networks for his work with glioblastoma cancer treatments.
