= James Robb (pathologist) =

American pathologist

James A. Robb is an American pathologist and molecular virologist.

Robb has a BA in theoretical physics from the University of Colorado. In 1965, he began medical studies at the University of Colorado Medical School, where he took his MD degree. He took a residency in pathology, as well as training in molecular biology, at Yale University, then went to work at the National Institutes of Health. He has been a professor at the University of California, San Diego, a consulting pathologist at the National Cancer Institute, and director of anatomic and molecular pathology at Cedars Medical Center in Miami, Florida. He is board certified in anatomic pathology, clinical pathology, cytopathology, and dermatopathology.

During the 1970s while he was at UC-San Diego, Robb published some of the earliest descriptions of coronaviruses. He co-wrote the chapter on coronaviruses in the book Comprehensive Virology and has published extensively on the subject. In February 2020, he wrote a "Dear colleagues" open letter detailing his advice on how to avoid contracting COVID-19 and similar diseases. In March 2020, this open letter received multiple on-line re-postings and obtained wide attention.
