= Poudre Valley Hospital =

Coordinates: 40°34′15.89″N 105°3′27.26″W

UCHealth Poudre Valley Hospital
- UCHealth

Geography
- Location: 1024 South Lemay Avenue, Fort Collins, Colorado, United States

Services
- Emergency department: Level III trauma center
- Beds: 270

History
- Founded: 1925 as Larimer County Hospital, renamed Poudre Valley Memorial Hospital in 1962 when transferred by the county to the hospital district, and then Poudre Valley Hospital in 1980

Links
- Website: www.uchealth.org/locations/uchealth-poudre-valley-hospital/
- Lists: Hospitals in Colorado

UCHealth Poudre Valley Hospital (PVH), located in Fort Collins, Colorado, is operated by UCHealth (University of Colorado Health) and serves northern Colorado, southern Wyoming, and western Nebraska. The hospital has 270 beds, and is a level III trauma center. It also houses 11 surgical suites, 12 intensive care unit beds, and a level III neonatal intensive care unit. The hospital is home to a regional orthopedic program, and many cancer treatment and rehabilitation services as well. The hospital has helped make Fort Collins a regional health center, and continues to do so, despite the 2007 opening of its sister hospital Medical Center of the Rockies in nearby Loveland.

== Residency training ==
The hospital has an ACGME-accredited residency program in family medicine. Eight residents are accepted per year. The three-year program emphasizes community-based and rural medicine to provide physicians to northern Colorado and southern Wyoming.

== History ==
Poudre Valley Hospital opened in 1925 as Larimer County Hospital. It became Poudre Valley Hospital (PVH) in 1980.

Poudre Valley Hospital received attention in 1998 as the hospital where Matthew Shepard was taken after being attacked outside Laramie, Wyoming. The sudden rush of traffic to the hospital's web site required reconfiguration of the site to support the traffic.

Poudre Valley Health System, which operated PVH and Medical Center of the Rockies at the time, was named one of three winners of the 2008 Malcolm Baldrige National Quality Award. PVHS was the only healthcare provider to win the award in 2008. Vice President Joe Biden presented the Baldrige award to PVHS in Washington, D.C., on December 2.

In 2012, the prior non-profit operator Poudre Valley Health System merged with the University of Colorado Hospital to form UCHealth. The Health Service District of Northern Larimer County still owns the land and the buildings which it leases to UCHealth. A recent state dispute over PVH's classification (public vs. private) as it relates to CHASE payments in 2023-2025 ended with a judge ruling in UCHealth's favor based on operator rather than owner, officially reclassifying PVH as private for state purposes as of late 2025, but the underlying relationship remains unchanged.
