= Ben Clarke (politician) =

American politician (1928–2026)

Member of the Colorado House of Representatives
- In office 1995–2001

Personal details
- Born: Benjamin King Clarke II; April 23, 1928 Columbus, Ohio, U.S.
- Died: August 6, 2026 (aged 98) Denver, Colorado, U.S.
- Party: Democratic
- Spouse: Mavis Hooper
- Education: University of Colorado School of Medicine

Benjamin King Clarke II (April 23, 1928 – August 6, 2026) was an American politician. A member of the Democratic Party, he served in the Colorado House of Representatives from 1995 to 2001.

== Early life and career ==
Clarke was born in Columbus, Ohio on April 23, 1928. At an early age, he moved to Denver Colorado. He attended and graduated from East High School. After graduating, he served in the United States Army, which after his discharge, he attended the University of Colorado School of Medicine, earning his medical degree. He completed his residency in anesthesiology in Minneapolis, Minnesota.

He served in the Colorado House of Representatives from 1995 to 2001.

== Personal life and death ==
Clarke was married to Mavis Hooper. Their marriage lasted until Clarke's death in 2026.

Clarke died in Denver, Colorado on August 6, 2026, at the age of 98.
