= Dane Prugh =

Dane Gaskill Prugh
- Born: June 3, 1918
- Died: 6 October 1990 (aged 72)

Dane Gaskill Prugh (3 June 1918 – 6 October 1990) was a child psychiatrist and psychoanalyst at the University of Colorado School of Medicine, whose work demonstrated the necessity for wider knowledge, understanding, and experience in the evaluation of such programs.

== Career ==
Prugh practiced psychiatry at the Medical Center in Brookline, then ran the inpatient unit in Rochester, New York for several years. He later left Rochester for Colorado.

For one year, from 1968 to 1969, Prugh served as President of the American Orthopsychiatric Association.

== Research ==
Prugh's research indicated children prefer stays in hospitals with cheerful and familiar surroundings, which are shorter and reduce difficulties adapting to the hospital environment. Related studies have shown that children who have the support of family members during prolonged hospitalizations are less likely to develop subsequent learning problems and delinquency. Prugh argued that the problem with much child psychiatry was not necessarily the ineffectiveness of treatment, but the inability to maintain care for the children after they returned to the community, and the consequent reversal of gains in mental health made during treatment when they became chronically hospitalized.

He is sometimes associated with the development of play therapy, and of affirmative action at the University of Colorado School of Medicine, (then a part of University of Colorado Denver), which now awards an annual Dane Prugh Teaching Award.

== Publications ==
- Dane G. Prugh (1983), The Psychosocial Aspects of Pediatrics, Lea & Febiger, 687 pages.
- Harold C. Stuart and Dane G. Prugh (1960), The Healthy Child: His Physical, Psychological, and Social Development, Harvard University Press, Cambridge, Massachusetts, 523 pages.
