= Shu Hongbing =

Chinese immunologist

- 舒红兵
- Born: January 1967 (age 59); Rongchang District, Chongqing, China
- Education: Lanzhou University; Emory University
- Spouse: Wang Yanyi (m. 2004)
- Awards: Changjiang (Yangtze River) Scholar Award, Chinese Ministry of Education (1999); Second prize, Chinese State Natural Science Award (2010); Member of Chinese Academy of Sciences (2011); Nature (journal) Mentoring in Science Award (2015)
- Scientific career
- Fields: Immunology, cell biology
- Workplaces: Peking University; Wuhan University
- Doctoral advisor: Harish Joshi
- Other academic advisors: Gary J. Nabel, David Goeddel

Shu Hongbing (Chinese: 舒红兵; born January 1967) is a Chinese cytologist and immunologist. He became a member of the Chinese Academy of Sciences in 2011 and TWAS in 2012. Shu is mainly known for his work on cell signal transduction related to immunity.

== Life ==
Shu Hongbing was born to a poor rural family in Rongchang County, Chongqing. His mother died when he was 9 years old. When Shu entered senior high school, he failed the chemistry exam, and did not know any English. He had to go to school barefoot because he could not afford to buy shoes. However, by the time he finished high school with a national stipend in 1983, he was accepted by Lanzhou University with the highest National Matriculation Examination score in his class. After graduating in 1987, Shu entered the Chinese Academy of Medical Sciences Basic Medical Institute Cell Laboratory, where he obtained his master's degree three years later.

In 1990, Shu went to the United States and worked as a research assistant at the University of Michigan Medical Center. In 1992, he became a postgraduate student at Emory University, where he earned his Ph.D. within 3 years. In 1995, he entered David Goeddel's laboratory at Tularik. In 1998 he became an assistant professor at the Department of Immunology of the National Jewish Medical and Research Center; he was promoted to associate professor in 2003. In 1999 Shu became a Changjiang scholar and part-time professor at Peking University School of Life Sciences. At the end of 2004, Wuhan University College of Life Sciences employed him as the dean. In December 2011, he was elected as a member of the Chinese Academy of Sciences. In September 2013, he was appointed as a vice-president of Wuhan University. In 2015, Dr. Shu was given a Mid-Career Mentoring in Science Award by the well-known journal Nature.

== Research ==
In 1999, Shu's team studied downstream signaling by TRAIL receptors. They discovered that a signaling cascade can mediate TRAIL-induced NF-κB activation, and TRAIL-induced apoptosis cannot be blocked by it. In 2000, he and his colleagues showed that FADD, Casper (caspase-8-related protein), and caspase-8 play important roles in NF-kappaB activation pathways. In 2002 they used two-hybrid screening to identify BAFF-R-associated downstream proteins, showing that TRAF3 can inhibit BAFF-R-mediated NF-kappaB activation and IL-10 production. They also cloned and identified a novel AIF-homologous molecule called AMID, which can lead the way to caspase-independent apoptosis.

In 2005, his team identified a novel molecule that serves as a signal transfer station. Previously in 2003, a Japanese team had already demonstrated several genes involved in NF-kappaB activation. Shu's team discovered that over-expression of one of these genes had a strong effect on IRF3 activation. Through a series of experiments, they discovered that the product of this gene greatly influences TLR3-independent IFN-β signaling. It was named VISA (virus-induced signaling adaptor). It can also interact with TRIF and TRAF6, and plays an essential role in virus-triggered TLR3-independent and TLR3-mediated antiviral IFN signaling. In 2008 they discovered another adaptor protein, MITA, through expression cloning. MITA is related to VISA, and has the ability to mediate virus-triggered IRF3 activation and IFN expression. Their later studies showed that by ubiquitination and degradation of MITA, E3 ubiquitin ligase RNF5 can negatively regulate cellular antiviral signaling.

In Shu's lab they also showed that SIKE, a physiological suppressor of IKK epsilon and TBK1, can inhibit virus and TLR3-triggered IRF-3 activation; that RBCK1, a ubiquitin ligase, negatively regulates TNF and IL-1 triggered inflammatory signaling; that DAK, a dihydroacetone kinase, can inhibit MDA5; and that ISG56 (IFN-stimulated gene 56) is related to VSV replication, and negatively mediates virus-triggered induction of type I IFNs.
