= C. Henry Kempe =

American physician

- Born: Karl Heinz Kempe; April 6, 1922; Breslau, Germany
- Died: March 3, 1984 (aged 61); Hanauma Bay, Hawaii, U.S.
- Occupations: Pediatrician and virologist
- Known for: Wrote "The Battered-Child Syndrome" in 1962. Founded The Kempe Center for the Prevention and Treatment of Child Abuse and Neglect.

C. Henry Kempe (birth name Karl Heinz Kempe; April 6, 1922 in Breslau, Germany (now Wrocław, Poland) – March 3, 1984 in Hanauma Bay, Hawaii) was an American pediatrician and the first in the medical community to identify and recognize child abuse.

In 1962, Kempe and his colleagues, including Brandt F. Steele and Henry Silver, published the paper "The Battered-Child Syndrome", which led to the identification and recognition by the medical community of child abuse.

Kempe received two nominations for the Nobel Prize: the first nomination was for his work in developing a safer smallpox vaccine; the second was recognition for his contribution to the prevention and treatment of child abuse. Due to the efforts of Kempe, abuse reporting laws exist in all 50 U.S. states. His efforts also led to the passage of the 1972 Colorado law requiring legal counsel for the child in all cases of suspected abuse.

== Early life ==
Kempe was the son of Richard and Mary Kempe. He was born into a Jewish family in Germany during the Nazi party's rise to power. Richard's watch repair business collapsed due to antisemitic official boycotts, and then the family was forced to sell off most of their possessions. When it became clear that staying was no longer an option, older sister Paula was sent off to England as a maid, Kempe's parents escaped to Bolivia, and Kempe, then 15 years old, stayed behind with a family friend while preparing to escape to Israel with a youth group. After that plan went awry, Kempe later escaped to England via the Kindertransport project and ended up in the United States all by himself, in a Los Angeles orphanage for Jewish immigrant refugees.

In America, he learned a new language, legally changed his name to "Charles Henry Kempe," completed high school, junior college, college, and medical school, and became a physician. He earned a bachelor's degree from the University of California, Berkeley in 1942 and a medical degree from the University of California, San Francisco in 1945, followed by a residency in pediatrics at Yale. In 1945, he became an American citizen.

Specializing in the study of virology, Kempe helped develop Vaccinia immune globulin to counter the adverse effects of the smallpox vaccine. In 1956, Kempe became the youngest chairman of the pediatrics department at the University of Colorado School of Medicine in Denver, where he would spend the rest of his career. During his tenure, he began to recognize the prevalence of non-accidental injuries to children. He demanded a better diagnostic investigation of the unexplained and life-threatening injuries observed in children at four different hospital emergency rooms: shattered bones, inflicted burns, and brain damage.

His research led to the publication of "The Battered-Child Syndrome".

== Career ==
=== Kempe Center ===
Kempe, his colleagues and wife Ruth Kempe founded The Kempe Center, originally the National Center for the Prevention and Treatment of Child Abuse and Neglect, in 1972 to prevent and treat child abuse and neglect.

In 1976, The Kempe Foundation was established to spearhead fundraising, awareness and advocacy efforts for children.

The Kempe Center and The Kempe Foundation are currently located at The Gary Pavilion at Children's Hospital (Aurora, Colorado).

=== The C. Henry Kempe Award ===
First awarded in 1985, The Kempe Award is presented to professionals and philanthropists who have contributed substantially to the community on behalf of children and who have creatively fought the war against child abuse. The award is given every two years by ISPCAN, The International Society for the Prevention of Child Abuse and Neglect, to an outstanding young professional or organization working in any discipline in the field of child abuse and neglect. Kempe personally helped to form ISPCAN in 1976.

=== Awards ===
- 1959 – E. Mead Johnson Award
- 1979 – UCSF MAA Alumni of the Year Award

== Personal ==
Kempe met his future wife Ruth Svibergson while they were both residents at Yale and they married in 1948. Ruth, who was also later a professor at CU, and Henry had five daughters. Their family joke was that he wanted a son, so he and Ruth "kept trying". Ruth and Henry were co-authors of several books, including Healthy Babies; Happy Parents.
