= Children's Hospital Colorado Foundation =

Nonprofit organization

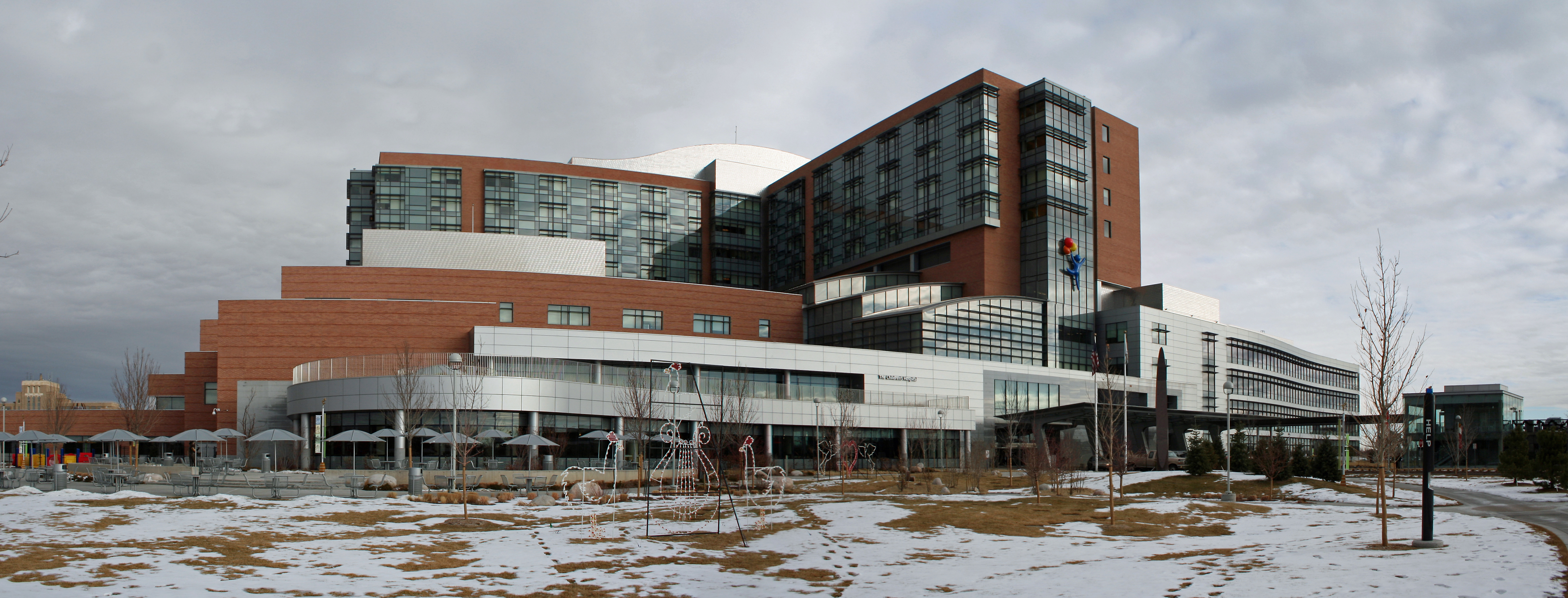
- Formation: 1978
- Founded at: Denver, Colorado
- Type: Children's Hospital Foundation
- Tax ID no.: 84-0813462
- Location: 13123 East 16th Avenue, Aurora
- Region served: Colorado
- Fields: Pediatrics, Health Care, community and family services
- Affiliations: Children's Hospital Colorado, Anschutz Medical Campus
- Website: www.supportchildrenscolorado.org

The Children's Hospital Colorado Foundation, founded in 1978, is a 501(c)(3) non-profit organization advancing the mission of Children's Hospital Colorado, founded in 1908, and with roots as a pioneer summer tent hospital as early as 1897 in Denver, Colorado. Main hospital facilities are located on the Anschutz Medical Campus in Aurora, Colorado. Children's Colorado Foundation serves three purposes: To educate and engage with the community on the hospital’s behalf, to fundraise for the hospital, and to steward funds raised for children and families who need Children's Colorado.

== List of events ==
- Courage Classic
- Children's Classic at Sanctuary
- KALC ALICE 105.9 Cares for Kids
- Climb for Courage at the US Air Force Academy
- Miles for Tuesday
- Annual Children's Gala
- Colorado Gives Day

== Financials ==
In 2014, Children's Hospital Colorado cared for more than 217,000 kids. Distributions made by the Foundation in carrying out its function were $21 million in 2014. In addition, endowment contributions of $9.7 million during 2014 were transferred to Children's Hospital Colorado Health System, where they are invested and continue to support the Hospital. Ending Foundation net assets were $30.1 million at December 31, 2014.
