= University of Colorado Health =

Not-for-profit health care system from Colorado

Coordinates: 39.743489°N 104.843068°W

UCHealth
- Trade name: UCHealth
- Type: Health care system
- Industry: Healthcare industry
- Founded: 2012; 14 years ago, in Aurora, Colorado, United States
- Headquarters: 12401 E. 17th Avenue, Aurora, Colorado, United States
- Areas served: Colorado, Wyoming, and Nebraska
- Key people: Elizabeth Concordia (CEO); Richard L. Monfort (chairman)
- Number of employees: more than 36,000
- Website: uchealth.org

UCHealth, trade name for University of Colorado Health, is a not-for-profit health care system, headquartered in Aurora, Colorado.

The system includes hospitals and facilities throughout Colorado, along with affiliated hospitals in Wyoming and Nebraska. The system includes an academic medical center, UCHealth University of Colorado Hospital, which is closely affiliated with the University of Colorado School of Medicine. It is a joint operating company between the University of Colorado Hospital Authority and Poudre Valley Health.

== History ==
University of Colorado Health was formed on January 31, 2012 (doing business as UCHealth since 2014), as a joint operating company between the University of Colorado Hospital Authority and Poudre Valley Health (of Poudre Valley Hospital).

In August 2012, voters in Colorado Springs approved a special election measure to allow UCHealth to lease and operate Memorial Hospital.

In 2015, Adeptus Health announced a partnership with UCHealth to develop emergency care facilities in Denver, Colorado Springs, and northern Colorado, including 12 existing First Choice emergency rooms along with two new ones.

In September 2016, UCHealth Broomfield Hospital opened. Located in Broomfield, Colorado, the hospital has 18 inpatient rooms and a 4-bed intensive care unit.

In February 2017, the system retitled itself as UCHealth. In addition to a refurbished website and logo, it added an app for patients.

In August 2017, a new 51-bed hospital opened in Longmont, Colorado in Boulder County called UCHealth Longs Peak Hospital.

In June 2019, the system opened a new hospital in Douglas County called UCHealth Highlands Ranch Hospital.

In July 2019, the system opened a new hospital in Weld County called UCHealth Greeley Hospital.

On December 1 2023, Parkview Medical Center in Pueblo and Parkview Pueblo West Hospital in Pueblo West merged with UCHealth.

In November 2024, it was announced that UCHealth had entered in a $23 million settlement with the United States Department of Justice over allegations that it had fraudulently billed emergency department patients with Tricare and Medicare for higher levels of service than were provided. The case was initiated from a UCHealth revenue auditing employee who filed a whistleblower complaint. As part of the settlement UCHealth had no admission of guilt and made a statement afterward denying wrongdoing, saying that they "agreed to the settlement to avoid potentially lengthy and costly litigation."

In 2025 UCHealth v. Colorado Department of HealthCare Policy and Financing (case No. 2024CV32363) documents how UCHealth sued HCPF to reclassify Memorial Central Hospital and Poudre Valley Hospital as private non-profit hospitals to improve the CHASE reimbursement terms (together these hospitals were getting back less money than they put in based on percentage of Medicaid patients). The parties settled with an agreement where HCPF will classify the hospitals as private non-profit because CMS and the state constitution allows definition to be based on operator or owner, and in this case UCHealth is the operator (a private non-profit corporation).

== Facilities ==
UCHealth consists of hospitals, clinics, and other health care facilities in local communities across Colorado, with affiliated hospitals Campbell County Health (Gillette, WY), Cheyenne Regional Medical Center (Cheyenne, WY), Ivinson Memorial Hospital (Laramie, WY) and Sidney Regional Medical Center (Sidney, NE).

As of June 30, 2026, UCHealth facilities have 2,645 available beds, including 35 at UCHealth Broomfield Hospital, 20 at UCHealth Estes Valley Medical Center, 22 at UCHealth Grandview Hospital, 88 at UCHealth Greeley Hospital, 151 at UCHealth Highlands Ranch Hospital, 100 at UCHealth Longs Peak Hospital, 246 at UCHealth Medical Center of the Rockies, 404 at UCHealth Memorial Hospital Central, 140 at UCHealth Memorial Hospital North, 259 at UCHealth Parkview Medical Center, 21 at UCHealth Parkview Pueblo West Hospital, 13 at UCHealth Pikes Peak Regional Hospital, 281 at UCHealth Poudre Valley Hospital, 831 at UCHealth University of Colorado Hospital, and 34 at UCHealth Yampa Valley Medical Center. Available Beds include Med/Surg, ICU, OB, NICU, Psych and Rehab beds.

Providers at UCHealth facilities have performed 18,610 baby deliveries, 818,894 ED visits, 133,706 surgeries, 207,845 inpatient admissions and observation visits, and 10,069,085 outpatient visits. Outpatient visits include clinic, urgent care, procedural and ancillary visits.

== Awards and recognition ==
UCHealth has been ranked as a top hospital in the United States on several occasions. In 2012, it was listed as a Thomson Reuters Top 100 Hospital. Between 2017 and 2021, UCHealth hospitals have been included numerous times on a list of America's Top Hospitals by U.S. News & World Report.

In 2018, the hospital achieved Level 1 Trauma Center Status. Also that year, the hospital received a Comprehensive Stroke Center designation.

In 2021, UCHealth was named the first-place winner in Healthcare Innovation's Innovator Awards program for 2021 for expanded their Virtual Health Center concept to facilitate a sepsis early-warning system with the goal of improving patient outcomes.

In August 2021, Forbes named UCHealth as the No. 1 employer in Colorado.

== See also ==
- UCHealth University of Colorado Hospital
- UCHealth Poudre Valley Hospital
- UCHealth Medical Center of the Rockies
- UCHealth Memorial Hospital Central
- UCHealth Memorial Hospital North
- UCHealth Parkview Medical Center
- UCHealth Yampa Valley Medical Center
