= Tian Bo =

Chinese virologist and professor (1931–2019)

- 田波
- Born: December 25, 1931; Huantai County, Shandong, China
- Died: December 15, 2019 (aged 87); Beijing, China
- Education: Beijing Agricultural University
- Scientific career
- Fields: Virology
- Workplaces: Wuhan University
- Doctoral students: Wang Yanyi

Tian Bo (Chinese: 田波; pinyin: Tián Bō; 25 December 1931 – 15 December 2019) was a Chinese virologist and professor at the School of Life Sciences, Wuhan University.

== Biography ==
Tian was born in Huantai County, Shandong, Republic of China on December 25, 1931. In 1950 he entered Beijing Agricultural University, majoring in plant protection, where he graduated in 1954.

After university, he was assigned to the Institute of Microbiology, Chinese Academy of Sciences (CAS), where he worked as a researcher, associate professor, full professor, and doctoral supervisor. He was a visiting scholar at the University of Adelaide (1981), University of Düsseldorf (1986), University of Maryland, College Park (1990), University of Wisconsin System (1990), and Scottish Crop Research Institute (1993). He was a member of the 8th and 9th National Committee of the Chinese People's Political Consultative Conference.

He died of an illness in Beijing on December 15, 2019, aged 87.

== Contributions ==
From the 1950s to the 1970s, Tian Bo clarified the role of virus and high temperature in the degradation of potato flower and leaf types, and worked out the technical scheme of virus-free potato seed production by virus-free shoot tip detoxification. In the 1980s, he began to study subviruses, first used Ribonucleic acid (RNA) to control the virus diseases caused by cucumber mosaic virus in the world, and obtained potato strains with high resistance to viroids. In the 1990s, he transferred to the study of medical virus, involving hepatitis B virus, HIV, SARS coronavirus, etc. for the first time, he found the complex of heat shock protein gp96 and viral antigen peptide in liver cancer tissue caused by hepatitis B virus, which provided a new strategy for the development of therapeutic drugs for chronic hepatitis B and liver cancer.

== Honours and awards ==
- State Natural Science Award (Second Class);
- 1991 Member of the Chinese Academy of Sciences (CAS);
- 1999 Science and Technology Award of the Ho Leung Ho Lee Foundation;
- Fellow of the American Society for Virology (ASV).
