= Childline South Africa =

South African youth counselling service

- Formation: 1986
- Purpose: Child Rights; Prevention; Education; Counselling; Lobbying; Advocacy
- Headquarters: 24 Essenwood Road, Durban, South Africa
- Region served: South Africa
- National Executive Director: Dumisile Nala
- Website: www.childlinesa.org.za

Childline South Africa is a non-profit organisation which works to protect children from violence and further the culture of children's rights in South Africa. Childline runs a national, 24-hour, toll-free telephone counselling service for children and adults, handling over 300 000 calls annually. In addition to the Helpline telephone counseling service, Childline also offers services such as online counseling, training programmes for continuous professional development, training on court preparation and workshops on child law.

== Helpline Service ==
The 24-hour national telephone counselling service is available to children up to 18 years of age, as well as adults with concerns about children. Telephone calls are routed to the closest Provincial Office to the caller, where trained counsellors are available to provide assistance. Calls to the Helpline are free from all networks. Counsellors are trained to deal with a wide variety of issues.

== Online counselling ==
Childline offered a free, online counselling service through the discontinued Mxit instant messaging application which was available to youth under the age of 18 years, as well as to adults with concerns about children. Initially trialed as a pilot project in 2009, the service quickly saw thousands of young people making use of it to seek help. Chat rooms were staffed by trained counsellors based at the Childline national office in Durban, and were operational Monday to Saturday, from 2 pm to 6 pm. After the demise of Mxit, Childline began its own Online Counselling Service on its website - www.childlinesa.org.za which is operational, Monday - Friday, 11am - 1pm and 2-6pm. Conversations between children and counsellors were strictly confidential and were conducted on a one-on-one basis, which allowed children to seek assistance on topics they would have ordinarily found difficult to discuss. Children who required face-to-face services may have been referred to their closest regional office for further counselling.

== Partnerships ==
=== Google ===
Google is partnered with Childline in promoting online safety for children through its online child safety campaign, launched on 1 June 2012. The partnership is intended to facilitate the co-ordination of work done by government, industry and civil society. The online child safety campaign saw the launch of a South African version of the Google Family Safety Centre, available in English, isiZulu and Afrikaans, and provides parents with information on how to prevent children from being exposed to inappropriate content through Google services.

=== International Society for Prevention of Child Abuse and Neglect ===
The International Society for Prevention of Child Abuse and Neglect (ISPCAN) focuses on training and education in the child protection field at a regional and international level. Childline is a member organisation of ISPCAN and is associated with ISPCAN training and international congresses, having assisted in the organisation of the ISPCAN International Congress held at the Inkosi Albert Luthuli International Convention Centre in 2008 in Durban. Childline has also had numerous papers accepted for presentation at the ISPCAN International Congresses, held every two years. The national coordinator of Childline is listed as a member of the expert faculty of ISPCAN, and also an elected member of the executive council of the organisation.

=== Child Helpline International ===
Child Helpline International (CHI) is a global network of 173 child helplines in 142 countries. Its functions are to provide a forum for information sharing and mutual support, assistance with advocacy and lobbying, promoting the rights of children and child helplines as a medium of assistance to children, and to support the initiation and development of child helplines in countries which do not have such services. Childline is partnered with Child Helpline International, and hosted the CHI Sixth International Consultation in 2012 in Durban.

== Funding ==
Childline is primarily funded by ad hoc donations from corporations and government parastatals. The lack of a reliable source of recurring corporate and governmental donations has resulted in the threat of imminent closure of some Childline offices on several occasions.

== See also ==
- ChildLine UK
- Ichikowitz Family Foundation
- UNICEF
