= Medical Center of the Rockies =

Coordinates: 40°24′56.12″N 104°59′52.15″W

UCHealth Medical Center of the Rockies
- UCHealth
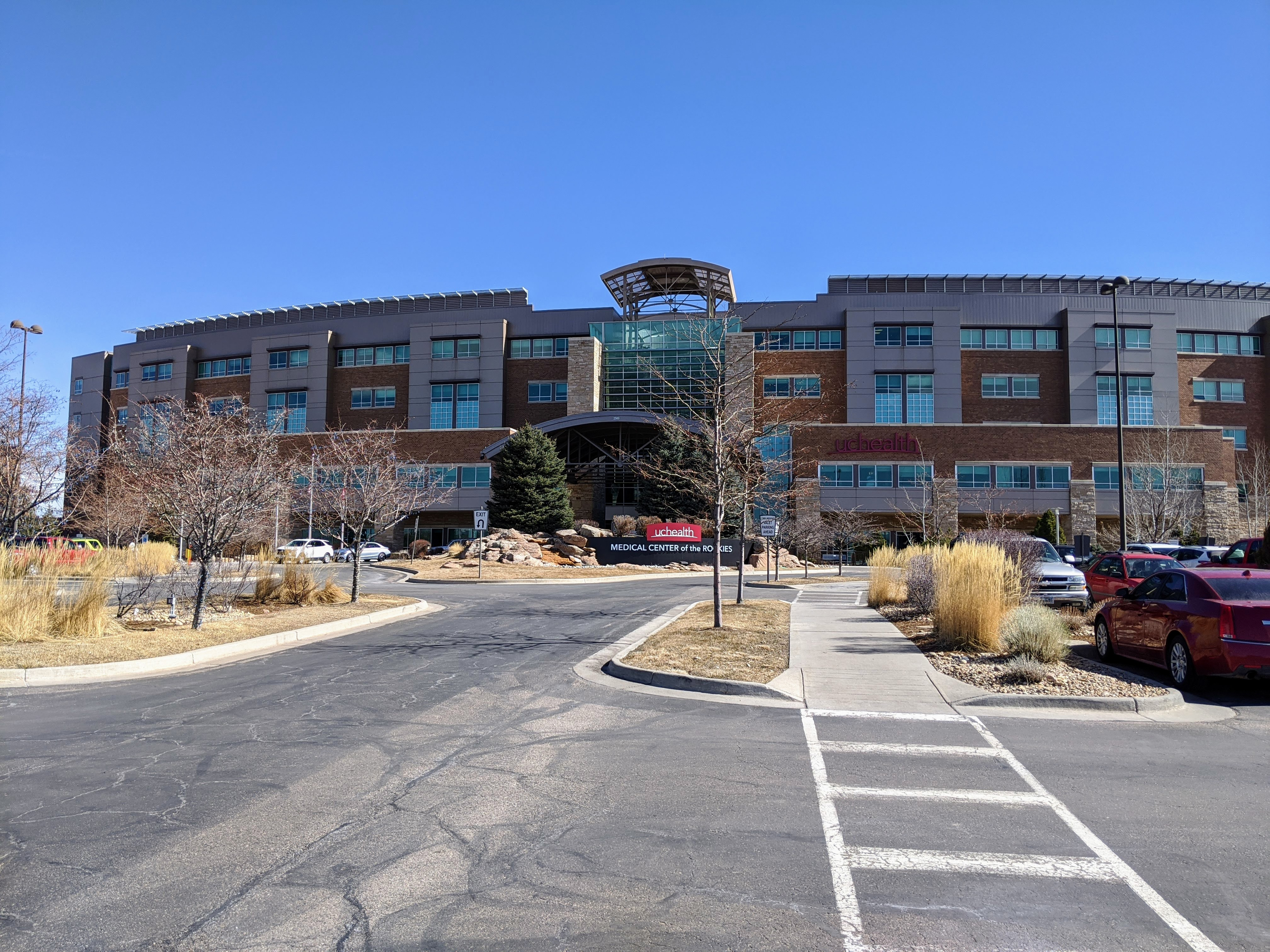
- The hospital's west side

Geography
- Location: 2500 Rocky Mountain Avenue, Loveland, Colorado, United States

Services
- Emergency department: Level I trauma center
- Beds: 187

History
- Founded: February 2007

Links
- Website: Official website
- Lists: Hospitals in Colorado

UCHealth Medical Center of the Rockies, located in Loveland, Colorado, is the sister hospital of Poudre Valley Hospital in Fort Collins, Colorado. Both are operated by UCHealth. The hospital is home to a regional heart center where open heart surgery is performed; a regional neurosciences center that cares for victims of head and back injury, stroke, spinal cord and nervous system diseases, as well as several neurosurgical intensive care beds.

== History ==
Medical Center of the Rockies opened to patients on Valentine's Day 2007, to relieve crowding in Poudre Valley Hospital, and provide better access to patients from outside of Fort Collins, Larimer County, and even the state of Colorado. Poudre Valley Hospital did not close as a result of the new hospital's opening, but downgraded its trauma center from a Level II to a Level III and now focuses much more on orthopedic care, and cancer treatment than MCR.

== Facilities ==
The hospital has 187 private rooms and offers a range of services such as neurosurgery, cardiac catheterization and open-heart surgery.
