= Wang Yanyi =

Chinese immunologist

- 王延轶
- Born: 1981 (age 44–45); Xi'an, Shaanxi, China
- Education: Peking University; University of Colorado Denver; Wuhan University
- Spouse: Shu Hongbing (m. 2004)
- Scientific career
- Fields: Immunology, Cell Biology
- Workplaces: Wuhan University; Wuhan Institute of Virology
- Thesis: WDR5 is essential for assembly of the VISA-associated signaling complex and virus-triggered IRF3 and NF-κB activation (2010)
- Doctoral advisor: Tian Bo

Chinese name
- Simplified Chinese: 王延轶
- Traditional Chinese: 王延軼
- Hanyu Pinyin: Wáng Yányì
Transcriptions
Standard Mandarin
- Hanyu Pinyin: Wáng Yányì
- Bopomofo: ㄨㄤˊ ㄧㄢˊ ㄧˋ
- IPA: [wǎŋ jɛ̌n.î]

Wang Yanyi (Chinese: 王延轶; pinyin: Wáng Yányì; born 1981) is a Chinese immunologist and virologist. Since 2018, she became the director general at the Wuhan Institute of Virology and the deputy director for Wuhan in the China Zhi Gong Party.

== Education ==
Wang earned her Bachelor's degree at the Peking University in 2004. After graduating, she went to the University of Colorado for her master's degree. She is married to Shu Hongbing, a graduate of Emory University.

== Career ==
=== Academic ===
In 2006, Wang worked as a lecturer at the University of Wuhan. She begin working on her thesis about pattern recognition signaling of the innate immune system as it relates to viruses, especially in regard to the Type 1 IFN system, which acts to alert the immune system to viral infection and in specific cases, overreact to the virus, causing lung inflammation and acute respiratory distress. Particularly her study involved the knockdown of WDR5 in order to see if it inhibited virus-triggered activation of IRF3 and NF-kappaB, as well as transcription of the IFNB1 gene, thereby lowering the immune response which could result in over-inflammation of the lungs and thus acute respiratory distress. Her findings in this study was that WDR5 is essential in assembling a virus-induced VISA-associated complex and in virus-triggered induction of type I IFNs. Wang completed her PhD in 2010, and then she began her work as an associate professor at the Wuhan University.

=== Research Director ===
In 2012, Wang started work as a researcher and team leader at the Wuhan Institute of Virology. In December 2015, she became deputy director general at the Institute, and in 2018, became the director general of the Institute.

==== Research areas ====
Since her time at the Wuhan Institute of Virology, Wang has continued her study of viral infections and their connection to immunological lung responses, which are often associated with diseases like SARS (a distant cousin infection to COVID-19).

One important research paper published by her was with reference to Insulin-Like Growth Factor-1 (IGF) Signaling in cases of lung inflammation, such as with acute respiratory distress. IGF s a bone-derived hormone that is essential for regulating vitamin D and phosphate balance. For those with kidney disease or a diet high in phosphate (such as in countries with food containing a significant amount of additives to their food (especially dairy), like the United States and some European countries, excessive IGF levels occur in order to prevent phosphotoxicity. When an individual absorbs phosphate from foods that are high in its bioavailability, the bone upregulates FGF23 production to induce greater urinary excretion of phosphate and minimizing the efficiency of intestinal phosphate absorption by reducing serum 1-25-dihydroxyvitamin D levels. This reduces the amount of Vitaman D, or 1-25-dihydroxyvitamin D, and this results in numerous endocrine issues, like thyroid disease, excessive inflammation, like fibrosis of the lungs, and Renal Kidney Disease (RKD) or Hyperphosphatemia.

Wang's work connected high levels of IGF to the lungs overreaction to viruses, like a coronavirus, which involves excessive inflammation and resulting Acute Respiratory Distress, which can be depicted by infections like those by any coronavirus. This inflammation can lead to sepsis and death, and Wang's attempt to show the relationship of phosphate related mediators like IGF, which could be evident of excessive phosphate in a diet, was to draw a connection to its likewise role in lung inflammation in cases of viral sepsis, where the patient bears a susceptibility to it because of a high phosphate diet and resulting low levels of Vitamin D. This research by her is similar to those also attempting to show high levels of phosphate as associated with lung cancer.

For those with kidney disease, the answer has been to reduce phosphate by taking phosphate binding substances, like calcium carbonate, in order to reduce the risk of inflammation, but for others who are subject to high phosphate levels that have not yet arisen to the level of kidney disease, the danger of lung inflammation following viral infection is possible and may explain inequitable reactions of patients with viral disease like pneumonia or coronavirus, as these person may be unaware of high phosphate levels affecting their metabolism of Vitamin D. High phosphate levels may also be unknown to those who eventually likewise succumb to lung cancer, where it has been shown to be a possible causative factor. Through Wang's research, in addition to that of others, use of phosphate binders such as calcium carbonate, or a diet low in phosphate, which are treatments for those suffering from kidney disease, may provide an option for treatment.

=== Politics ===
Wang became a member of the China Zhi Gong Party in 2010, eventually becoming the deputy director for Wuhan in the party in 2018.

In August 2020, Wang appeared on NBC News and denied claims by the U.S. Trump Administration that the Wuhan Institute of Virology was the origin of the COVID-19 virus, or that they had safety problems. She said, "We are the Autobots, not the Decepticons."
