= Memorial Hospital North =

- UCHealth
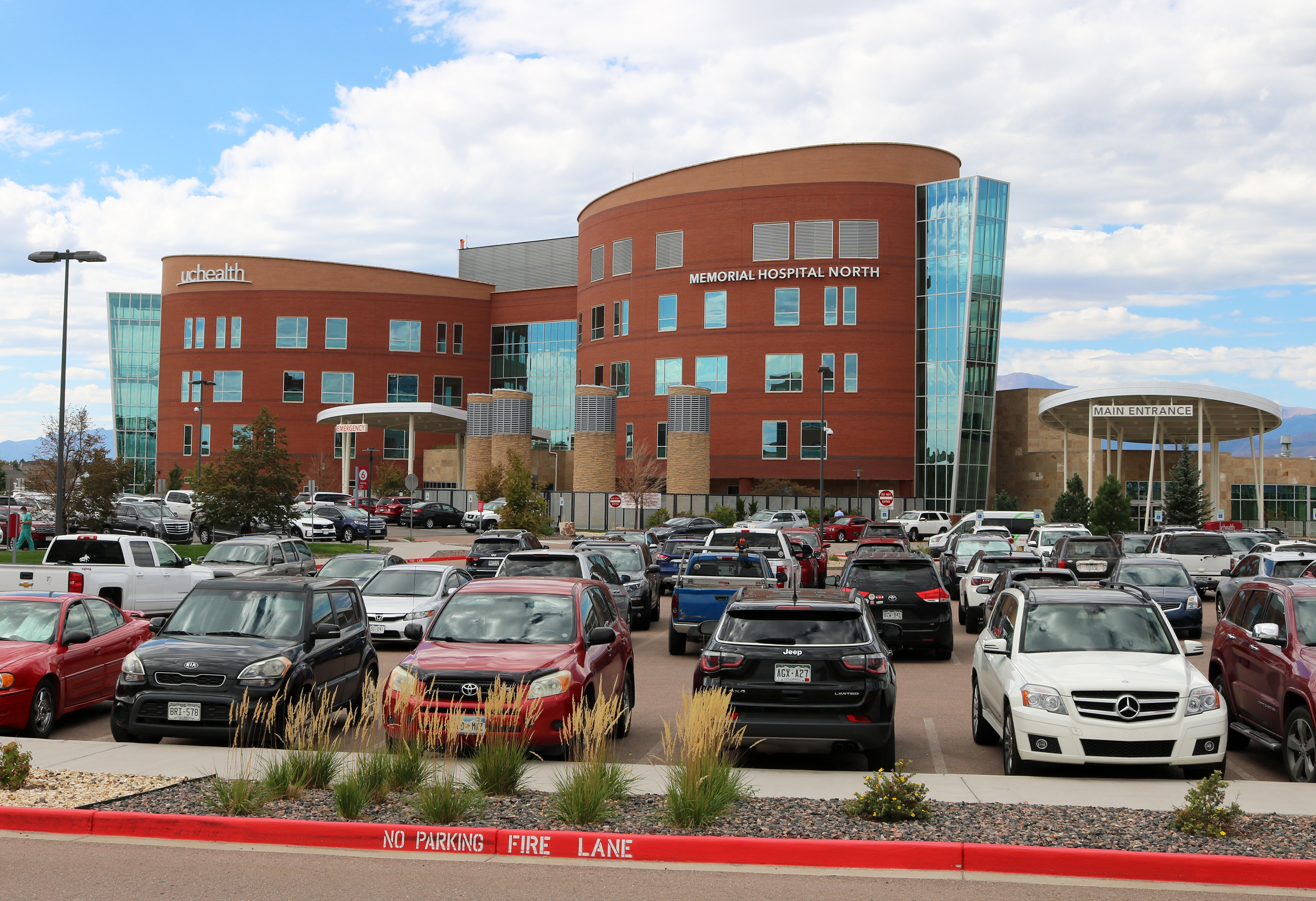
- The hospital's main façade and parking area

- The hospital's location in Colorado.

Geography
- Location: 4050 Briargate Parkway; Colorado Springs, Colorado 80920, El Paso County, Colorado, United States
- Coordinates: 38°58′1″N 104°45′17″W

Organization
- Care system: Private
- Type: Acute hospital

Services
- Beds: 123

History
- Founded: 2007

Links
- Website: www.uchealth.org/locations/uchealth-memorial-hospital-north/
- Lists: Hospitals in Colorado

Memorial Hospital North, also called UCHealth Memorial Hospital North, is an acute hospital in Colorado Springs, Colorado, in El Paso County.

== History ==
The hospital originally launched as a community hospital in 2007. It has now experienced significant growth, becoming a full-service hospital.

The hospital, located on the north side of Colorado Springs, operates in partnership with Memorial Hospital Central, located downtown.
