= Children's Hospital Colorado =

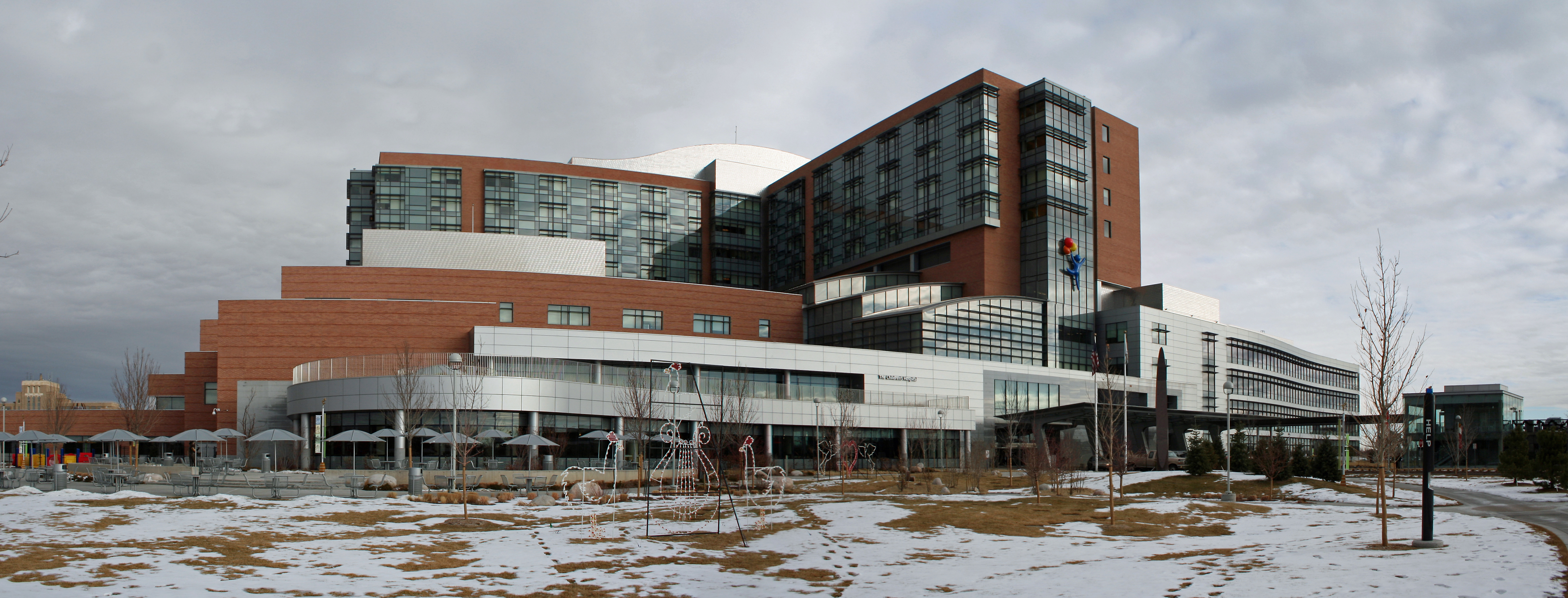

Geography
- Location: 13123 East 16th Avenue, Aurora, Colorado, United States
- Coordinates: 39.741°N 104.836°W

Organization
- Care system: Not-for-profit
- Type: Children's Hospital
- Affiliated university: University of Colorado Denver

Services
- Emergency department: Level 1 Pediatric Trauma Center
- Beds: More than 600

Helipads
- Helipad: FAA LID: 2CD8

History
- Former name: The Children's Hospital
- Founded: 1908; 118 years ago

Links
- Website: Children's Hospital Colorado
- Lists: Hospitals in Colorado

Children's Hospital Colorado (Children's Colorado) is an academic pediatric acute care children's hospital system with its flagship hospital located in the Anschutz Medical Campus near the interchange of I-225 and Colfax Avenue in Aurora, Colorado. The hospital system has more than 600 pediatric beds at its four hospitals located in Aurora, Colorado Springs, Highlands Ranch and Broomfield. As Children's Colorado is a teaching hospital, it operates a number of residency programs, which train newly graduated physicians in various pediatric specialties and subspecialties. The hospital is affiliated with the University of Colorado Denver School of Medicine. The hospital provides comprehensive pediatric specialties and subspecialties to infants, children, teens, and young adults aged 0–21 and sometimes until 25 throughout Colorado and the Midwest. The hospital also sometimes treats adults that require pediatric care. Children's Colorado is the only children's hospital (verified by the CHA) in Colorado. Additionally, the hospital has outpatient centers, campuses, and doctors offices around Colorado. The hospital features an ACS verified Level 1 Pediatric Trauma Center and features a rooftop helipad to transport critically ill patients.

== History ==
In the late 1800s, parents of kids with medical needs traveled to Colorado hoping that the state's high elevation, low humidity and considerable sunshine would help serve as a cure. To accommodate that need, a group of volunteers established the Babies Summer Hospital in City Park in 1897. Early on, those volunteers saw a need for a permanent hospital that would "care for sick, injured and crippled children from birth to 16 years of age" and which would be supported mainly by volunteer contributions. With that goal to guide them, this same group of intrepid volunteers officially incorporated as The Children's Hospital on May 9, 1908.

In 1909, Children's Colorado converted a former residence at 2221 Downing Street in Denver into a "well equipped institution with a capacity of 30 beds," admitting its first patients on Feb. 17, 1910. As the demand for the hospital's services increased, it quickly outgrew its location at 22nd Avenue and Downing Street. The hospital raised more than $200,000 to build a new facility, which opened in 1917 at 19th Avenue and Downing Street in downtown Denver. The "beautiful, new, green and white" building opened with 100 beds and with what The Denver Post described at the time as "every article of equipment known to science."

After numerous expansions over the years at the hospital's downtown Denver location, Children's Hospital Colorado opened its new campus in Aurora on September 29, 2007. The 1,440,000 square feet (134,000 m^{2}) hospital designed by ZGF Architects includes 284 beds and advanced medical equipment especially designed for children, as well as inspiring artwork and outstanding family accommodations.

On June 21, 2011, the hospital announced that its name was changing from The Children's Hospital to Children's Hospital Colorado. The hospital made the change to help differentiate it from other hospitals in the country with the same name.

One of the volunteers often credited with helping found the original Babies Summer Hospital was Dr. Minnie C.T. Love, who is a controversial and complicated figure in Colorado history. She graduated from Howard University College of Medicine and was elected to the Colorado House of Representatives in 1921, where she served as the chair of the Committee on Medical Affairs and Public Health. She lost her bid for re-election in 1922, but later joined the Colorado Chapter of the Women of the Ku Klux Klan and won her subsequent election campaign in 1924. In addition to being a member of the KKK, Dr. Love held racist views in the areas of eugenics. Children's Hospital Colorado has denounced Dr. Love for her views and chooses not to honor her in any capacity.

In March 2020, the hospital announced that it was expanding its age limit to all patients up to age 30 amidst the COVID-19 pandemic to help bring demand away from overcrowded adult hospitals. Although the hospital is treating patients under 30, it is not accepting patients with significant substance use or psychiatric disorders because those are outside of its areas of care. This is a small difference from the hospitals usual age limit of 25.

On the 2022-23 rankings, the hospital was ranked as the #7 best children's hospital in the United States by U.S. News & World Report on the publications' honor roll list.

In November 2020, Dwayne "The Rock" Johnson collaborated with Microsoft and billionaire Bill Gates to donate Xbox Series X consoles to Children's Hospital Colorado along with 19 other children's hospitals throughout the country.

== Programs ==
- It is the only Level 1 Pediatric Trauma Center in Colorado.
- It has a Level IV Neonatal Intensive Care Unit, the highest distinction granted by the American Academy of Pediatrics. Children's Hospital Colorado NICU treats nearly 750 infants each year from a 10-state area, and is the only NICU in the region with the experience and technology to treat virtually any medical condition affecting newborns.
- The Heart Institute at Children's Hospital Colorado is the largest in the region, treating more than 20,000 patients each year. It is also one of only eight stand-alone pediatric research centers in the country.
- Children's Hospital Colorado offers pediatric weight management programs to combat childhood obesity.
- Children's Hospital Colorado Center for Cancer and Blood Disorders is the only pediatric cancer center in the Rocky Mountain region providing care for patients from birth to age 25. It also has the region's only pediatric neuro-oncology program for brain tumor diagnosis and treatment; program for teenagers with cancer; pediatric bone marrow transplant program; pediatric onco-fertility program that helps cancer patients maximize their chances for future fertility; and the region's only pediatric Experimental Therapeutics Program investigating promising new drugs for cancer treatment.
- The Orthopedics Institute at Children's Hospital Colorado treats growing muscles, joints and bones.
- The Center for Gait and Movement Analysis at Children's Hospital Colorado was the second lab in the world to offer movement analysis through motion-capture technology, kinetics, and electromyography, helping specialists fine-tune the best possible course of treatment.
- The Breathing Institute at Children's Hospital Colorado, along with other Colorado physicians, pioneered many of the standard practices used to treat and diagnose pediatric respiratory disease today. It was the first in the world to recognize and treat interstitial lung disease, the first to use nitric oxide to treat neonatal hypertension, and the first to initiate newborn cystic fibrosis screening.

== Affiliation ==
Children's Colorado's campus is affiliated with, and adjacent to, the University of Colorado School of Medicine. The university is home to education and research facilities. Children's Colorado is staffed with doctors from the Department of Pediatrics.

== 2022 facts and figures ==
- Licensed Beds: 618
- Total Surgeries: 26,242
- Inpatient Admissions: 21,439
- Average Length of Stay (in days): 6.6
- Total Outpatient Visits: 627,665
- Total Days of Inpatient Care: 140,942
- Emergency and Urgent Care Visits: 212,286
- Total Number of Employees: 8,437
- Total Medical Staff: 2,678
- Total Residents and Fellows: 307
- Total Volunteers: 2,661
- Value of Community Benefit Activities: $301.52 million

== Clinical and surgical services ==
Children's Hospital Colorado treats pediatric patients with childhood illnesses and provides surgery in areas such as The hospital provides pediatric sleep medicine services through its Sleep Program, which evaluates and treats sleep-related conditions in children.

=== Clinical ===	=== Surgical ===
Allergy	Abdominal and thoracic surgery
Asthma, Breathing & Lung	Bariatric surgery
Behavior & Development	Cleft, craniofacial and plastic and reconstructive surgery
Brain, Spinal Cord & Nervous System	Colorectal surgery
Cancer & Blood Disorders	Dental surgery
Dental	Ear, nose and throat surgery
Diabetes, Endocrine & Growth	Fetal surgery
Digestive, Liver & Pancreas	Heart surgery
Ear, Nose & Throat	Burn treatment and trauma surgery
Emergency medical conditions	Minimally invasive surgery
Eye	Neurosurgery
Genetics & Inherited Metabolic Diseases	Orthopedic surgery
Gynecology	Ophthalmology surgery
Hearing, Speech & Learning	Pediatric and adolescent gynecology
Heart	Transplant surgery
Immune System & Infectious Disease	Urology surgery
Kidney, Bladder & Urinary	
Newborn	
Orthopedic	
Psychology & Psychiatry	
Rehabilitation & Therapy	
Skin	
Sleep	
Sports Medicine	
Teen Health	
Weight Management	

== Locations ==
The hospital operates over a dozen satellite hospitals, outpatient clinics, and other treatment centers throughout the Front Range urban corridor. As of 2022, these include:

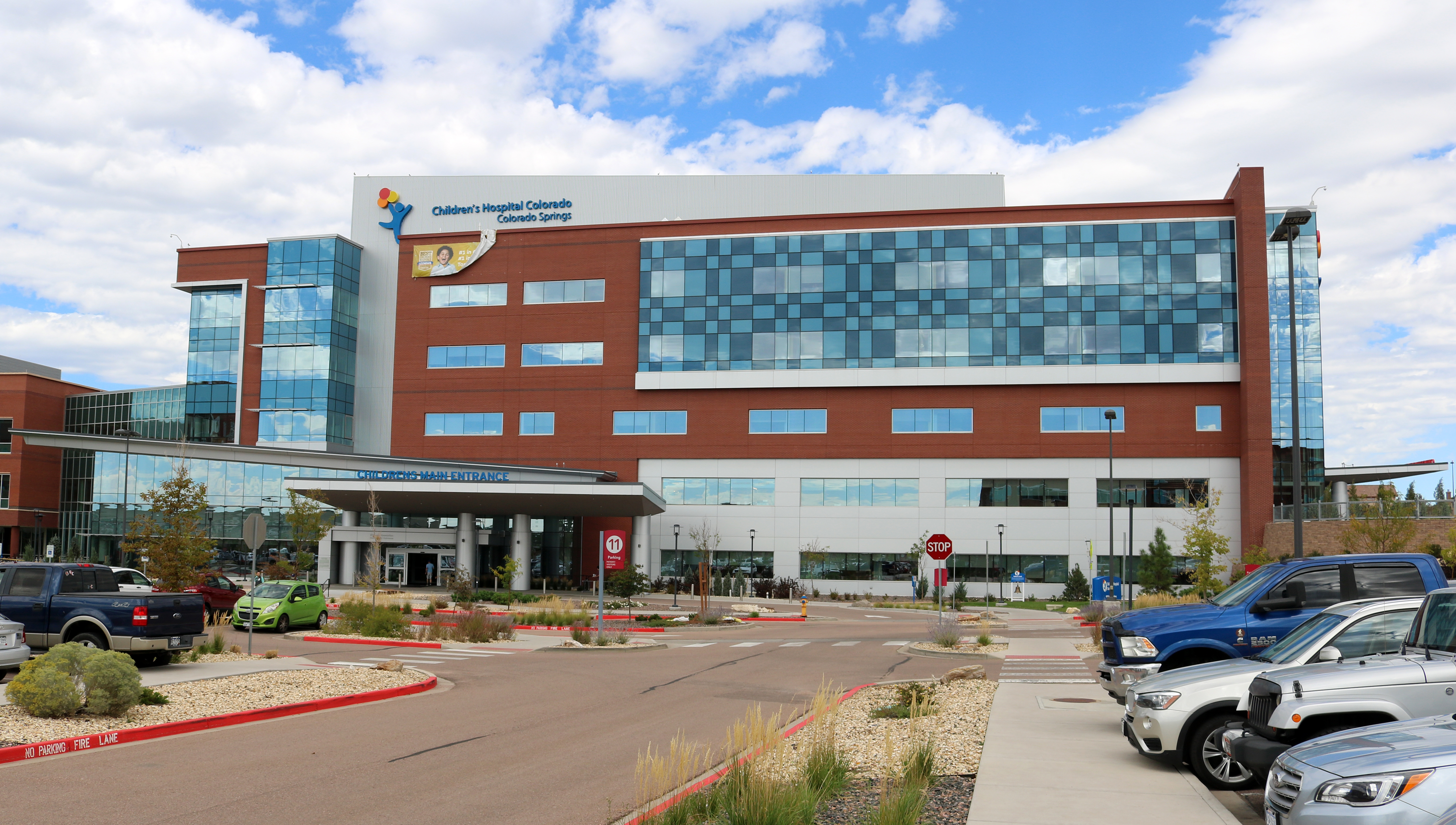
Children's Hospital Colorado Colorado Springs

- Anschutz Medical Campus, Aurora
- Children's Colorado Health Pavilion, Aurora
- KidStreet, Aurora
- Orthopedic Care, Centennial
- Outpatient Care, Wheat Ridge
- Outpatient Care, Southeast Aurora
- South Campus, Highlands Ranch
- Therapy Care, Highlands Ranch
- Therapy Care, Broomfield
- North Campus, Broomfield
- Children's Hospital Colorado Colorado Springs, Colorado Springs
- Outpatient Care at Briargate, Colorado Springs
- Memorial Hospital Central, Colorado Springs
- Therapy Care on Telstar, Colorado Springs

== Awards ==
As of 2026–27, Children's Hospital Colorado was ranked as a top ten children's hospital in the United States by U.S. News & World Report on the publication's honor-roll list

U.S. News & World Report Rankings for Children's Hospital Colorado
Specialty	Rank (in the U.S.)	Score (out of 100)
Neonatology	#8	85.4
Pediatric Cancer	#11	91.1
Pediatric Cardiology & Heart Surgery	#2	97.9
Pediatric Diabetes & Endocrinology	#5	91.1
Pediatric Gastroenterology & GI Surgery	#8	93.6
Pediatric Nephrology	#33	78.8
Pediatric Neurology & Neurosurgery	#14	88.2
Pediatric Orthopedics	#16	85.3
Pediatric Pulmonology & Lung Surgery	#6	95.2
Pediatric Urology	#13	85.0
Pediatric & Adolescent Behavioral Health	Top 50	N/A

== See also ==
- Children's Hospital Colorado Foundation
- List of children's hospitals in the United States
