= Jeffrey Swanson =

American medical sociologist

Jeffrey W. Swanson
- Born: March 24, 1957 (age 69)
- Education: Westmont College (B.A., 1979), Yale University (M.A., 1980, Ph.D., 1985)
- Awards: See below
- Scientific career
- Fields: Psychiatry, medical sociology
- Workplaces: Duke University School of Medicine
- Thesis: The moral career of the missionary (1985)

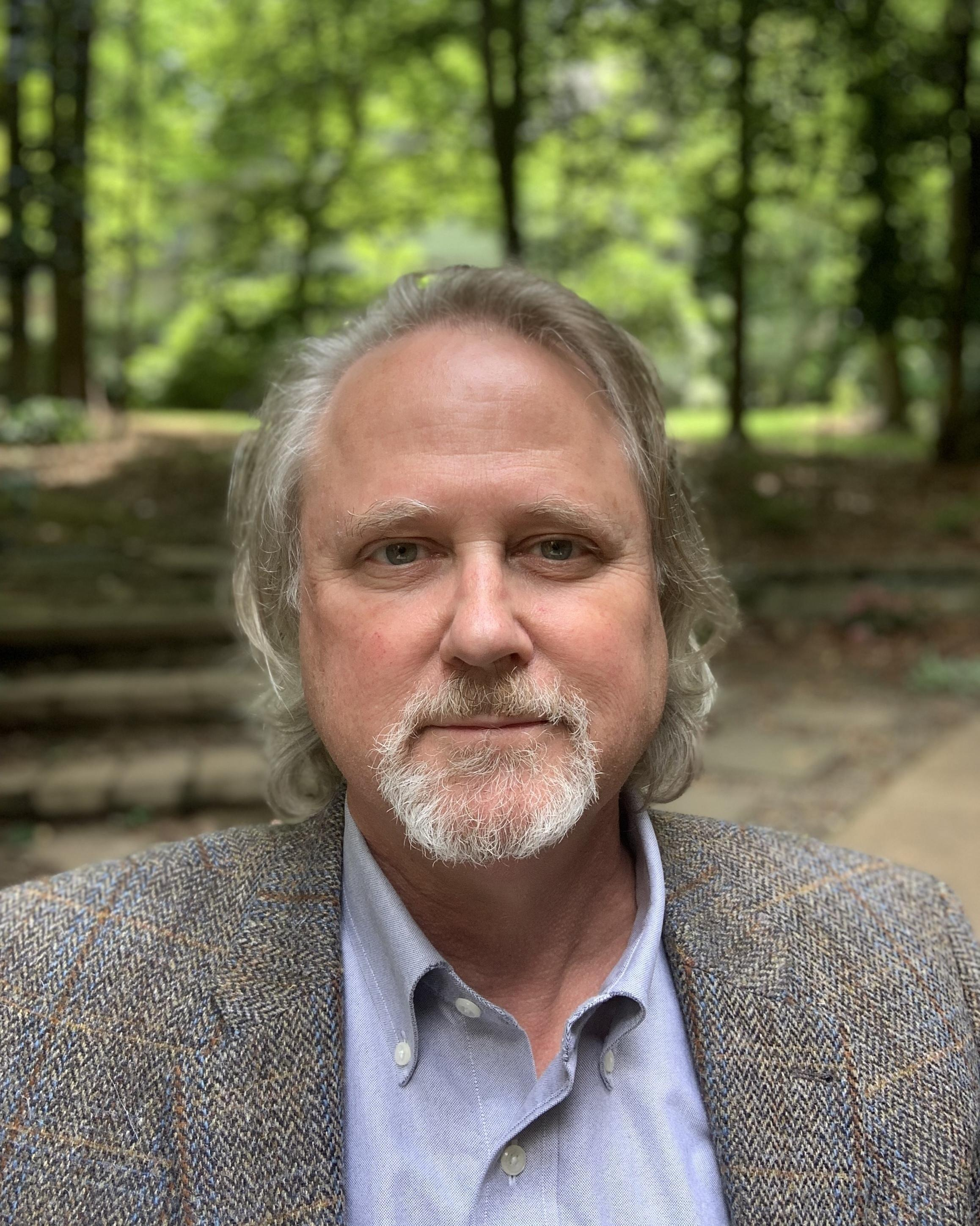
Jeffrey SwansonDuke University

Jeffrey W. Swanson (born March 24, 1957) is an American medical sociologist and professor in psychiatry and behavioral sciences at Duke University School of Medicine. He is an expert in psychiatric epidemiology, especially as regards the epidemiology of violence and serious mental illness.

== Education ==
Swanson received his B.A. from Westmont College in sociology in 1979. He later received his M.A. and Ph.D. from Yale University in 1980 and 1985, respectively. His PhD was in sociology and his dissertation was entitled "The Moral Career of the Missionary," later published by Oxford University Press as a book titled "Echoes of the Call: Identity and Ideology among American Missionaries in Ecuador."

== Career ==
Swanson first became interested in the intersection between mental illness and violence when working at the University of Texas Medical Branch at Galveston shortly after finishing graduate school. In 1991, he joined Duke as a medical center instructor. Since 2007, he has been a tenured professor in psychiatry and behavioral sciences there.

== Research ==
Swanson has co-authored over 250 articles and book chapters on subjects such as the epidemiology of violence and mental illness, the effectiveness of community-based interventions for people with serious psychiatric disorders, such as schizophrenia, and causes of gun violence, as well as policies aimed at reducing it. In 1990, he led a study that found that, when excluding substance abusers, 33% of adults with mental illness reported having behaved violently at any time in the past, as compared with only 15 percent of non-mentally-ill people. The same study found that substance abuse was a strong predictor of violence. This study has been criticized for overstating the connection between serious mental illness and violence. In 2015, he led a study that found that 8.9% of those interviewed, which would equate to roughly 22 million Americans, had both impulsive anger issues—meaning they developed "explosive, uncontrollable rage" when provoked—and easy access to guns in their homes. In 2016, he led a study analyzing data from two Florida counties that found that 72% of mentally ill people who committed suicide with a gun purchased it legally. Later that year, he published a study evaluating a 1999 Connecticut law allowing police to remove guns from people believed to be at risk of suicide. The study found that one suicide was prevented for every 10 to 20 guns seized under the law.

== Views ==
Shortly after the Sandy Hook Elementary School shooting, Swanson told The New York Times that "Psychiatrists, using clinical judgment, are not much better than chance at predicting which individual patients will do something violent and which will not.” The following January, he told The Washington Post that “there’s a modest relative risk” for violence among people with a serious mental illness.

== Awards and honors ==
Swanson received the 2020 Isaac Ray Award from the American Psychiatric Association Foundation and the American Academy of Psychiatry and Law for outstanding contributions to the psychiatric aspects of jurisprudence. He received the 2011 Carl Taube Award from the American Public Health Association and the 2010 Eugene C. Hargrove, MD Award from the North Carolina Psychiatric Foundation for his career in researching mental health. He was awarded a NARSAD Distinguished Investigator Grant from the Brain & Behavior Research Foundation in 2013, and an Independent Research Scientist Career Award from the National Institute of Mental Health in 2004. Swanson delivered the P. Browning Hoffman Memorial Lecture in Law and Psychiatry at the University of Virginia School of Law in 2015 and the Raymond W. Waggoner Lecture on Ethics and Values in Medicine at the University of Michigan in 2016.
