= Memorial Hospital Central =

- UCHealth
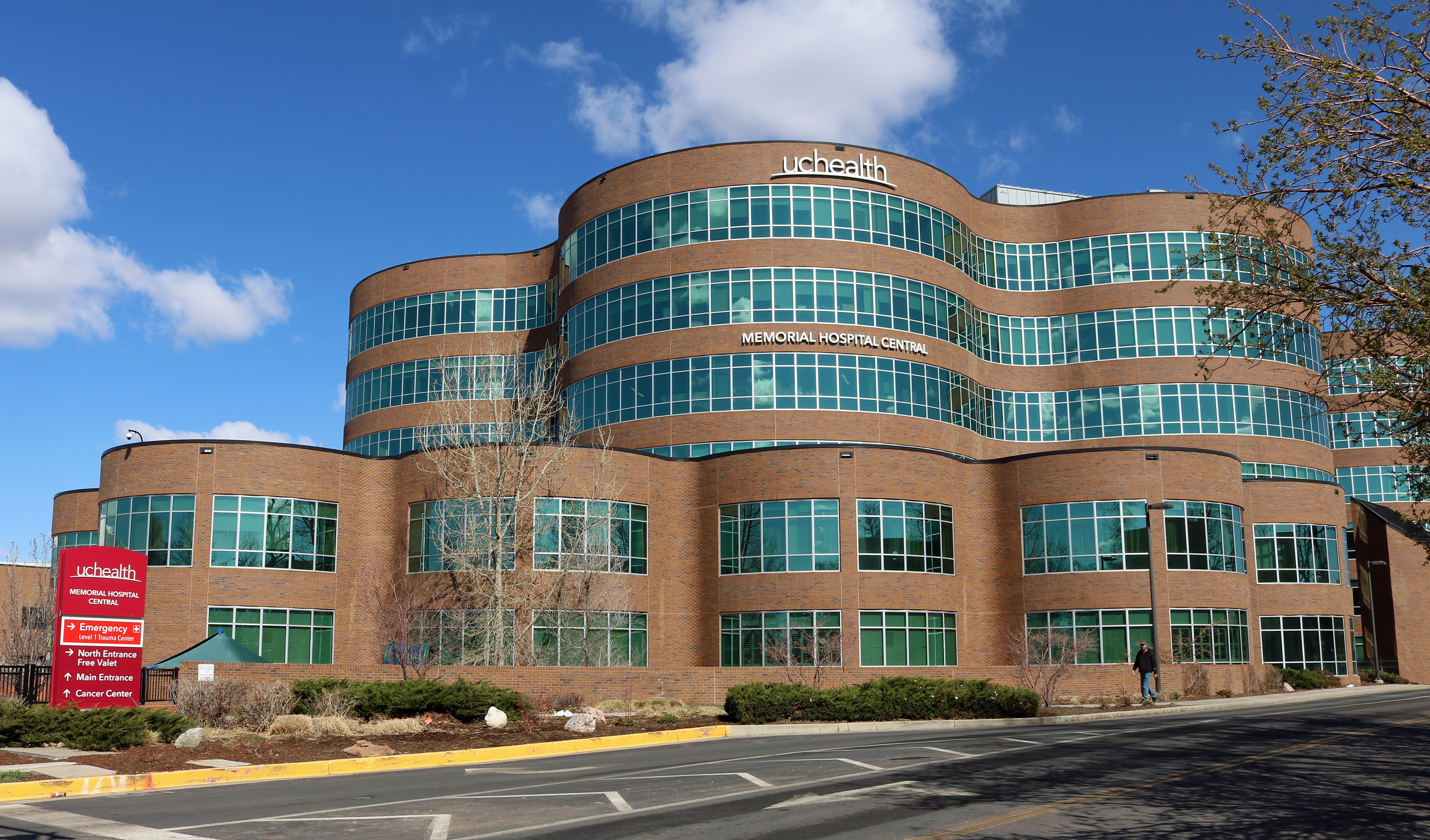
- The hospital's main façade on East Boulder Street

- The hospital's location in Colorado.

Geography
- Location: 1400 East Boulder Street; Colorado Springs, Colorado 80909, El Paso County, Colorado, United States
- Coordinates: 38°50′23″N 104°47′59″W

Organization
- Type: Acute hospital

Services
- Emergency department: Level I trauma center
- Beds: 485 (this number includes beds at Memorial Hospital North)

Helipads
- Helipad: Yes

History
- Founded: 1904

Links
- Website: www.uchealth.org/locations/uchealth-memorial-hospital-central/
- Lists: Hospitals in Colorado

Memorial Hospital Central, also called UCHealth Memorial Hospital Central, is an acute hospital in Colorado Springs, Colorado, in El Paso County. Originally established in 1904, the hospital has 485 beds and is a Level I trauma center, the only Level I trauma center in southern Colorado.

== History ==
The hospital was first established as the Colorado Conference Deaconess Hospital and Training School of the Methodist Episcopal Church in 1904 by members of the Woman's Home Missionary Society of the Colorado Springs First Methodist Episcopal Church and other members of the community who saw a need for a Protestant hospital in the city. Its first location was in a wooden building at the intersection of South Institute Street and East Colorado Avenue. Nurses and nurse trainees first staffed the hospital, but city doctors were invited to join the staff as well.

In 1911, a new hospital building was constructed at 1400 East Boulder Street and renamed Beth-El Hospital and Training School. In 1922 The National Board of Hospital and Homes of the Methodist Episcopal Church acquired the hospital and changed its name to Beth-El General Hospital and School of Nursing. In 1943, the city of Colorado Springs purchased the hospital and renamed it Memorial Hospital and Beth-El School of Nursing of Colorado Springs.

In 1985, the nursing school became the Beth-El College of Nursing, and in 1997, the nursing college was spun off and relocated to the University of Colorado Colorado Springs campus. Voting on a referendum in 2012, the citizens of Colorado Springs agreed to lease the hospital to UCHealth for forty years, and it was renamed UCHealth Memorial Hospital.

Later, the name changed to Memorial Hospital Central to differentiate it from Memorial Hospital North, which is located on Briargate Parkway north of Colorado Springs.
