= University of Colorado School of Medicine =

Medical school in Aurora, Colorado

Coordinates: 39.74503692°N 104.83753502°W

- Type: Medical school
- Established: 1883
- Parent institution: University of Colorado Anschutz Medical Campus
- Dean: John H. Sampson
- Faculty: 3,964
- Students: 717 in MD Program
- Location: Aurora, Colorado, United States
- Website: CU School of Medicine

The University of Colorado School of Medicine is the medical school of the University of Colorado system. It is located at the Anschutz Medical Campus in Aurora, Colorado, one of the four University of Colorado campuses, six miles east of downtown Denver at the junction of Interstate 225 and Colfax Avenue.

== History ==
The school was founded in 1883 in Boulder. In 1924, the school relocated to a new campus at Ninth Avenue and Colorado Boulevard in Denver on land donated by Frederick G. Bonfils. This campus also contained a new Colorado General Hospital. By the 1990s, the school was outgrowing its aging facilities. In 1999, the Fitzsimons Army Medical Center in Aurora closed and between 1999 and 2008 the school of medicine moved to the site, which was renamed the Anschutz Medical Campus for the Anschutz Foundation. The Ninth Avenue campus is currently being redeveloped. The new Anschutz Medical Campus also contains the University of Colorado School of Dental Medicine, the University of Colorado College of Nursing, the University of Colorado Skaggs School of Pharmacy, and the Colorado School of Public Health, as well as University of Colorado, Denver graduate school programs. The University of Colorado Hospital and Children's Hospital Colorado have relocated to the campus, along with the Rocky Mountain Regional VA Medical Center. The school operates a campus for 3rd and 4th year medical students completing clinical rotations in Colorado Springs and in 2021 opened a campus in Fort Collins in collaboration with Colorado State University.

The School of Medicine offers a four-year program leading to an MD degree, and houses various graduate programs leading to the PhD degree. The school also includes a Child Health Associate/Physician Assistant (CHAPA) degree and a doctor of Physical Therapy degree. Both are three-year programs. The Medical Scientist Training Program (MSTP) awards both MD and PhD degrees. There are about 650 MD students at the school, plus 350 in the Physician Assistant and Physical Therapy programs and 400 in Graduate Medical Education.

The University of Colorado's School of Pharmacy (SOP) began in 1911 as a division of the School of Medicine. It became an independent college in 1913 and a school in 1957. It received its accreditation in 1938–1939 and awarded a B.S. in Pharmacy degree in 1995–1996 when it received a full accreditation status awarding the Doctor of Pharmacy (PharmD) degree by the ACPE. In 2008, the school moved to the Anschutz Medical Campus, rejoined the medical school, and offers medical and graduate degrees in pharmacy, the pharmaceutical sciences, molecular toxicology, and pharmaceutical outcomes research. 30% of its class is from out of state. In 2009, the NIH awarded $7,310,389 and $19,189,543 in grants towards the SOP and Pharmacology department, respectively. In 2011, the school moved into its new building, the Skaggs School of Pharmacy and Pharmaceutical Sciences, located on the Anschutz Medical Campus.

== Achievements ==
The school and its affiliates have a distinguished record of clinical and research achievements. The University of Colorado Cancer Center is designated a Comprehensive Cancer Center by the National Cancer Institute and is ranked 15th in the country by U.S. News & World Report; Overall, the University of Colorado Hospital is ranked as the 15th best hospital in the country. Children's Hospital Colorado is routinely ranked in the top 10 in the country by the same publication. The school receives approximately $500 million in research awards annually and is ranked 8th among public medical schools in NIH funding. Major accomplishments include developing the international standard for classifying and numbering human chromosomes by Theodore Puck, the first successful human liver transplant by Thomas Starzl, the first description of toxic shock syndrome by James K. Todd, the first description of ARDS, and the discovery of the T-cell receptor.

== Affiliations ==
The school's major teaching affiliates are the University of Colorado Hospital, Children's Hospital Colorado, Denver Health, the Rocky Mountain Regional VA Medical Center, and National Jewish Health.

== Students ==
The school has admitted men and women on an equal basis since its founding. The school received about 14,000 applications for the MD program for the 2019–20 academic year. There are 184 students accepted each year, including 24 assigned to the new Colorado Springs branch. There is a Medical Scientist Training Program. The school also operates physical therapy, physician assistant, and other degree programs which enroll several hundred more students.

== Notable people ==
- Ben Clarke
- Jule Eisenbud
- Patricia A. Gabow
- Dane Prugh
- John Kappler
- C. Henry Kempe
- Darrell Kirch
- Kjell Lindgren
- Philippa Marrack
- Tracee Metcalfe, alumna and mountaineer
- Theodore Puck
- Maurice H. Rees
- James Robb (pathologist)
- Florence Sabin
- Thomas Starzl
- David Talmage
- Yanyi Wang
- Howard L. Weiner
