= University of Colorado Hospital =

Coordinates: 39.7423°N 104.8414°W

- UCHealth
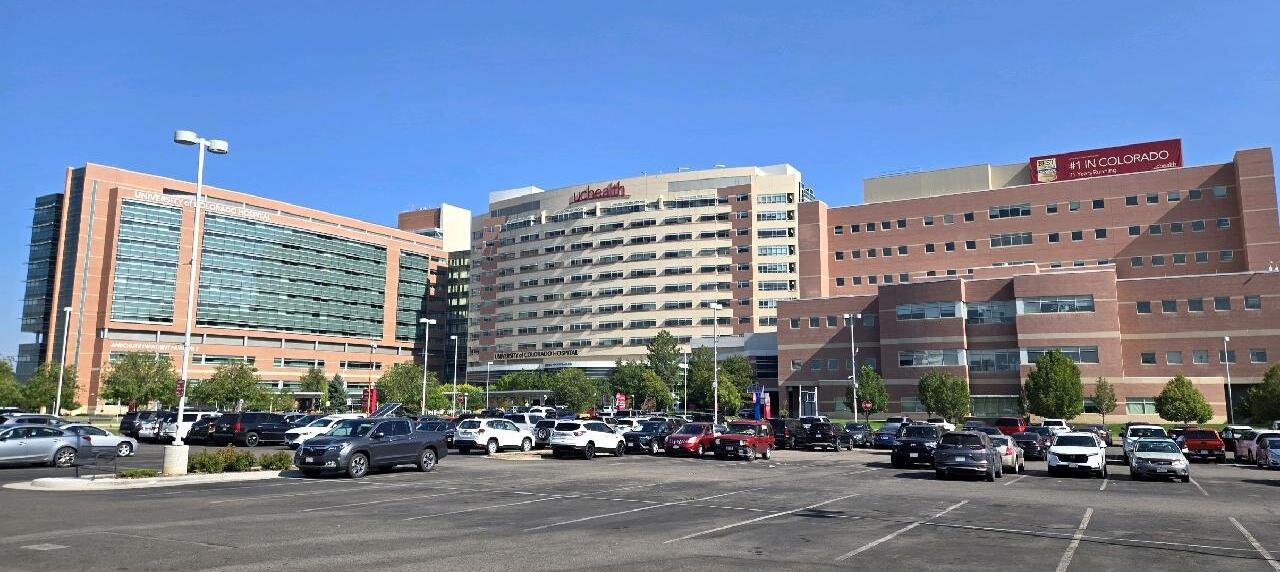
- University of Colorado Hospital in 2024

Geography
- Location: 12605 East 16th Avenue, Aurora, Colorado, United States

Organization
- Type: General
- Affiliated university: University of Colorado School of Medicine

Services
- Beds: 678

History
- Founded: 1921

Links
- Website: www.uchealth.org/locations/uchealth-university-of-colorado-hospital-uch/
- Lists: Hospitals in Colorado

University of Colorado Hospital (formerly named Colorado General Hospital) is part of University of Colorado Health and is a Level I trauma center and the principal teaching hospital for the University of Colorado School of Medicine, located in Aurora, Colorado.

In the 2017–2018 U.S. News & World Report hospital rankings, UCHealth University of Colorado Hospital ranked in the top 50 for 11 medical specialties and was rated the #15 overall adult hospital in the country.

In 2005, UCH was redesignated by the American Nurses Credentialing Center (ANCC) as a magnet facility. In 2010, the hospital received its third redesignation of Magnet status. The hospital is currently pursuing its fourth Magnet designation.

== Hospital Safety Rankings ==
The Leapfrog Hospital Safety Grade is a public service provided by The Leapfrog Group, an independent nonprofit organization committed to driving quality, safety, and transparency in the U.S. health system. For Spring 2024, UCHealth University of Colorado Hospital has received a 'C' grade, with 'A' being the highest possible grade and 'F' being the lowest.

== Facilities ==
- The Anschutz Inpatient Pavilion
- The Anschutz Outpatient Pavilion
- The Anschutz Cancer Pavilion
- Rocky Mountain Lions Eye Institute
- May Bonfils Stanton Clinics
- Center for Dependency, Addiction and Rehabilitation
- The Lone Tree Health Center
- Six primary care clinics located in Aurora, Denver, Westminster, Boulder and Lone Tree

== History ==
The University of Colorado University Hospital was originally created on October 1, 1989, as a nonprofit corporation pursuant to an act of the Colorado General Assembly, and after the act was declared unconstitutional by the Colorado Supreme Court in 1990, was recreated in 1991 as the University of Colorado Hospital Authority as a special purpose government subdivision of the state.

== Governance and Ownership ==
The joint operating agreement that forms the Joint Operating Company between the University of Colorado Hospital Authority (UCHA) and UCHealth allows the hospital authority to retain 100% of the physical assets.
