= National Register of Historic Places listings in Uinta County, Wyoming =

Location of Uinta County in Wyoming

This is a list of the National Register of Historic Places listings in Uinta County, Wyoming.

This is intended to be a complete list of the properties and districts on the National Register of Historic Places in Uinta County, Wyoming, United States. The locations of National Register properties and districts for which the latitude and longitude coordinates are included below, may be seen in a map.

There are 14 properties and districts listed on the National Register in the county.

This National Park Service list is complete through NPS recent listings posted May 1, 2026.

Contents: Counties in Wyoming
Albany - Big Horn - Campbell - Carbon - Converse - Crook - Fremont - Goshen - Hot Springs - Johnson - Laramie - Lincoln - Natrona - Niobrara - Park - Platte - Sheridan - Sublette - Sweetwater - Teton - Uinta - Washakie - Weston

== Current listings ==
| | Name on the Register | Image | Date listed | Location | City or town | Description |
|---|---|---|---|---|---|---|
| 1 | Black and Orange Cabins | Black and Orange Cabins | April 23, 2020 (#100005191) | 37000 I-80 Business Loop; 41°19′05″N 110°23′21″W | Fort Bridger | Wyoming's best surviving motor court representing the impact of auto tourism along the Lincoln Highway in the 1920s and 30s, with five contributing properties including two four-unit cabins with their own carports. Preserved within Fort Bridger State Historic Site. |
| 2 | Bridger Antelope Trap | Bridger Antelope Trap | January 21, 1971 (#71000893) | Address restricted | Evanston | Wooden quarter-mile (400 m) wing and 700-foot-diameter (210 m) circle into which Native Americans would drive pronghorns sometime before 1850, representing a distinctive hunting strategy of the northwestern Great Plains. |
| 3 | Downtown Evanston Historic District | Downtown Evanston Historic District | November 25, 1983 (#83004307) | Roughly bounded by Center, 9th, 11th, and Front Sts. 41°16′04″N 110°57′58″W | Evanston | Downtown district with 41 contributing properties that chart Evanston's evolution from a railroad boomtown to a major commercial and government center in southwest Wyoming. |
| 4 | ERT Bridge over Black's Fork | ERT Bridge over Black's Fork | February 22, 1985 (#85000441) | County Road CN19-217; 41°18′05″N 110°23′31″W | Fort Bridger | Rigid-connected Warren truss bridge built circa 1920; an early example of a widely used configuration after Wyoming's shift from county-funded bridges to standardized, state highway department designs. Replaced in 1988. |
| 5 | Fort Bridger | Fort Bridger | April 16, 1969 (#69000197) | 37000 I-80 Business Loop; 41°19′03″N 110°23′25″W | Fort Bridger | Site of a trading post (1843–1857) turned U.S. military fort (1858–1890), with 15 contributing properties. A vital point for commerce, overland migration, transcontinental communication and transportation, and U.S.–Native relations through key stages of western history. Preserved as a state historic site. |
| 6 | Piedmont Charcoal Kilns | Piedmont Charcoal Kilns | June 3, 1971 (#71000894) | County Rd. 173; 41°13′12″N 110°37′10″W | Piedmont | Trackside kilns built circa 1869 to produce charcoal to fuel mining smelters—three intact and one partial ruin of once-common frontier structures that left vast areas devegetated in the service of industry. Preserved as a state historic site. |
| 7 | A. V. Quinn House | A. V. Quinn House | September 13, 1984 (#84003712) | 1049 Center St. 41°16′03″N 110°58′04″W | Evanston | 1883 house of Anthony Quinn (1831–1913)—a western settler turned prosperous merchant and politician—and Mattie Quinn (d. 1898), a founder of the state's temperance movement and a University of Wyoming trustee. |
| 8 | St. Paul's Episcopal Church | St. Paul's Episcopal Church | November 17, 1980 (#80004057) | 949 Sage St. 41°15′58″N 110°58′04″W | Evanston | Exemplary Carpenter Gothic church built 1884–85 by an Episcopal congregation, but serving multiple communities of faith for a time as Evanston's only Protestant house of worship. |
| 9 | Triangulation Point Draw Site District (48UT114; 48UT377; 48UT392; 48UT440) | Triangulation Point Draw Site District (48UT114; 48UT377; 48UT392; 48UT440) | September 16, 1986 (#86002320) | Address restricted | Verne | District of Late Prehistoric occupation sites illuminating influences from the eastern Great Basin and northwestern Great Plains that characterized Indigenous lifestyles in southwest Wyoming. |
| 10 | Uinta County Courthouse | Uinta County Courthouse | July 14, 1977 (#77001385) | 225 9th St. 41°15′59″N 110°57′54″W | Evanston | The long-serving seat of Uinta County government and Wyoming's oldest county courthouse, with an 1873 core covered by expansions in 1874 and 1910. |
| 11 | Union Pacific Railroad Complex | Union Pacific Railroad Complex | February 26, 1985 (#85000685) | Main and 15th Sts. 41°16′18″N 110°58′12″W | Evanston | Railroad division headquarters complex with 10 contributing properties built 1880s–1920s, a well-preserved symbol of the economic impact of the Union Pacific Railroad on anchoring Evanston. |
| 12 | US Post Office-Evanston Main | US Post Office-Evanston Main | May 19, 1987 (#87000790) | 221 10th St. 41°16′01″N 110°57′59″W | Evanston | 1908 post office and federal courthouse noted for its superlative Beaux-Arts architecture and import as (porkish) federal recognition of Evanston secured by Senator Clarence D. Clark. Also a contributing property to the Downtown Evanston Historic District. |
| 13 | Wyoming State Insane Asylum | Wyoming State Insane Asylum | February 27, 2003 (#03000084) | 831 Wyoming Highway 150 S. 41°15′48″N 110°56′58″W | Evanston | Wyoming's only state-run psychiatric hospital, an important statewide resource and a longstanding local institution. Contains 16 contributing properties built 1887–1948 that reflect trends in the treatment of mental illness. |
| 14 | Brigham Young Oil Well | | April 25, 1985 (#85000872) | Northeastern quarter of the northeastern quarter of Section 4, Township 13, Range 119; 41°08′15″N 110°50′10″W | Evanston | Natural petroleum seep used by the initial 1847 Mormon pioneers, and expanded into a well used up until 1869 by Mormon migrants and settlers in the Salt Lake Valley. |

== See also ==
- List of National Historic Landmarks in Wyoming
- National Register of Historic Places listings in Wyoming
