= List of hospitals in Wyoming =

This is a list of hospitals in Wyoming (U.S. state), sorted alphabetically.

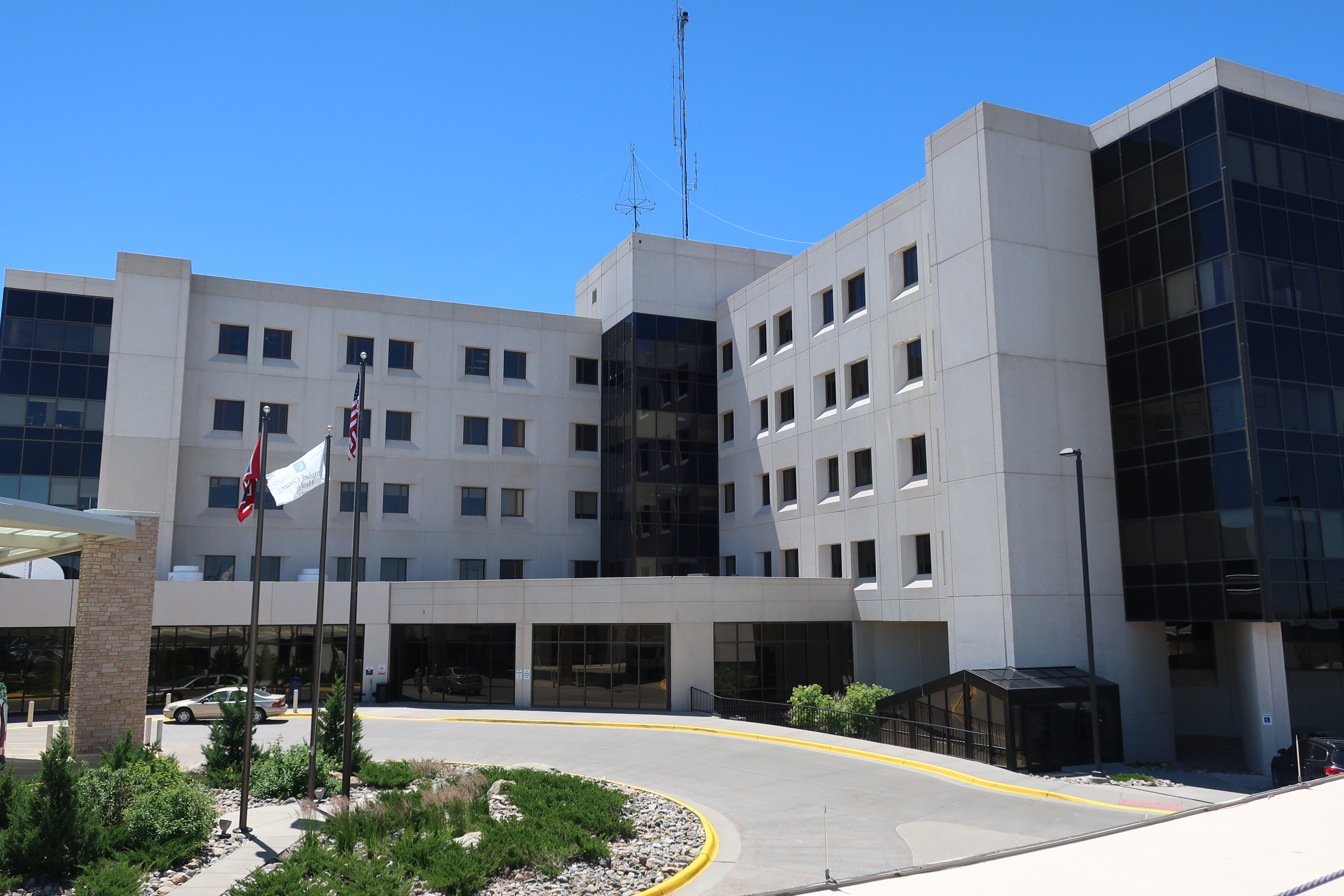
Campbell County Memorial Hospital in Gillette

- Campbell County Memorial Hospital - Gillette
- Carbon County Memorial Hospital - Rawlins
- Castle Rock Hospital District - Green River
- Cheyenne Regional Medical Center - Cheyenne
- Community Hospital - Torrington
- Crook County Medical Service - Sundance
- Evanston Regional Hospital - Evanston
- Hot Springs Memorial Hospital - Thermopolis
- Ivinson Memorial Hospital - Laramie
- Johnson County Health Care Center - Buffalo
- Memorial Hospital of Converse County - Douglas
- Memorial Hospital of Sheridan County - Sheridan
- ~~Mountain View Regional Hospital - Casper~~
- Niobrara Health and Life Center - Lusk
- Platte County Memorial Hospital - Wheatland
- Powell Valley Hospital - Powell
- SageWest Healthcare - Lander - Lander
- SageWest Healthcare - Riverton - Riverton
- Sheridan Memorial Hospital - Sheridan
- South Big Horn County Hospital - Basin/Greybull
- South Lincoln Medical Center - Kemmerer, Wyoming
- St. John's Medical Center - Jackson
- Star Valley Medical Center - Afton
- Summit Medical Center - Casper
- Sublette County Health - Pinedale
- Memorial Hospital of Sweetwater County - Rock Springs
- US Air Force Hospital - F. E. Warren Air Force Base
- VA Medical Center Cheyenne - Cheyenne
- Washakie Medical Center - Worland
- West Park Hospital - Cody
- Weston County Health Service - Newcastle
- Banner Medical Center (formerly Wyoming Medical Center) - Casper
- Wyoming State Hospital - Evanston
