= Evanston Regional Hospital =

Hospital in Evanston, Wyoming, United States

- Quorum Health Corporation

Geography
- Location: Evanston, Uinta County, Wyoming, United States
- Coordinates: 41°14′35.47″N 110°59′24.94″W

Organization
- Care system: Private
- Affiliated university: University of Utah Health

Services
- Emergency department: Level IV trauma center
- Beds: 42

Helipads
- Helipad: ICAO: WY52

History
- Former names: Uinta County Memorial Hospital (1950–1984); Uinta Medical Center (1984–1985); IHC Evanston Regional Hospital (1985–1999)
- Constructed: 1949
- Opened: 1950 (original campus); 1984 (current campus)

Links
- Website: evanstonregionalhospital.com
- Lists: Hospitals in Wyoming

Evanston Regional Hospital (formerly Uinta County Memorial Hospital) is a 42-bed hospital in Evanston, Wyoming. First opened in 1950 as a county-owned hospital, it moved to its present campus in 1984 and is currently owned by the private, for-profit Quorum Health Corporation. It also operates clinics in the surrounding communities.

== History ==
Prior to construction of a hospital in Evanston, the nearest hospital facilities were located in Coalville, Utah (36 miles away), Ogden, Utah (76 miles away) or Salt Lake City (86 miles away). Dudley B. McNeil of St. Paul's Episcopal Church in Evanston made an attempt in the 1940s to establish a hospital in the city. While the church successfully collected both funds and pledges for the construction, World War II and its resulting supply shortages hampered the project.

The hospital plan was revived when, in August 1948, the citizens of Uinta County voted to issue a bond of $150,000 (equivalent to $2,010,042 in 2025), allowing construction of the hospital to move forward. Passage of the bond also allowed the county to receive a $60,000 (equivalent to $804,017 in 2025) federal grant via a federal hospital building program to help cover construction costs. Construction of the hospital was underway by summer 1949, with a cornerstone ceremony held in October of that year. On August 1, 1950, the hospital officially opened under the name Uinta County Memorial Hospital, in memory of those who had died in World War II. At its opening, the hospital contained 25 beds and was to serve those in southwest Wyoming and parts of northeast Utah.

By the late 1970s, the hospital was in poor financial condition and in 1978 the county signed a lease agreement with Lutheran Hospitals and Homes Society of America (LHHS) based in Fargo, North Dakota (which would later rebrand as Banner Health) to manage the facility. In November 1982, LHHS broke ground on a new hospital campus near Overthrust Road in the city. The new 42-bed hospital was dedicated on June 10, 1984, with patients being moved in on July 1 of that year. The hospital was also renamed to Uinta Medical Center as part of the move to its new campus. The hospital's original campus then became a senior citizens center.

The following year, in 1985, Salt Lake City-based Intermountain Healthcare (IHC) purchased the hospital, renaming it to IHC Evanston Regional Hospital. IHC owned and operated the hospital for 14 years, after which it was sold to Tennessee-based Community Health Systems (CHS) in 1999. When Quorum Health Corporation was spun off from CHS in 2016, Evanston Regional Hospital was included as part of the new company.

== Services ==
As of 2020, the hospital has 42 beds and employs a total of 220 persons, including 45 physicians. Since 2018, the hospital has been part of the affiliate network of University of Utah Health.

At the end of December 2024, the hospital discontinued its labor and delivery services.
