= Valley Medical Center =

Valley Medical Center may refer to the following hospitals:

- Santa Clara Valley Medical Center in San Jose, California
- Valley Hospital Medical Center in Las Vegas, Nevada
- Valley Medical Center in Renton, Washington
- Willamette Valley Medical Center in McMinnville, Oregon
  - Valley Medical Center Heliport

== See also ==
- Valley Hospital (disambiguation)
- Medical centers named after valleys:
  - Arkansas Valley Regional Medical Center
  - Cagayan Valley Medical Center
  - Chino Valley Medical Center
  - Lehigh Valley Hospital–Cedar Crest
  - Lompoc Valley Medical Center
  - Ohio Valley Medical Center
  - Pascack Valley Medical Center
  - Queen of the Valley Medical Center
  - San Luis Valley Regional Medical Center
  - Star Valley Medical Center
  - UCHealth Yampa Valley Medical Center
  - Utah Valley Hospital
