= Nancy G. Wallace =

Wyoming politician

Member of the Wyoming House of Representatives from the Uinta district
- In office 1968–1971
- Succeeded by: Albert E. Bradbury

Personal details
- Relatives: Albert E. Bradbury (brother-in-law)

Nancy G. Wallace was an American Republican politician from Evanston, Wyoming. She represented the Uinta district in the Wyoming House of Representatives from 1968 to 1971.
