= Harry L. Harris =

American politician (1927–2013)

Member of the Wyoming House of Representatives from Uinta County
- In office 1973–1974
- Preceded by: Albert E. Bradbury
- Succeeded by: Hight M. Proffit

Personal details
- Born: Harry Lee Harris; January 23, 1927 Evanston, Wyoming, U.S.
- Died: May 23, 2013 (aged 86) Mesa, Arizona, U.S.
- Party: Republican
- Education: University of Wyoming

Harry Lee Harris (January 23, 1927 – May 23, 2013) was an American politician. A member of the Republican Party, he served in the Wyoming House of Representatives from 1973 to 1974.

== Life and career ==
Harris was born in Evanston, Wyoming, the son of Martin Fowker Harris and Rose Crompton. He attended Evanston High School, graduating in 1944. After graduating, he attended the University of Wyoming, earning his law degree in 1951.

Harris served in the Wyoming House of Representatives from 1973 to 1974. After his service in the House, he served as a trustee of the University of Wyoming from 1990 to 1996.

== Death ==
Harris died on May 23, 2013, in Mesa, Arizona, at the age of 86.
