= Curtis Ashton =

American electrical engineer

- Born: Evanston, Wyoming, U.S.
- Education: Arizona State University
- Occupation: Electrical engineer

Curtis Ashton is an American electrical engineer. He was named a fellow of the Institute of Electrical and Electronics Engineers, "for leadership in expanding the breadth and impact of IEEE battery standards".
