= Star Valley Medical Center =

Hospital in Wyoming

Star Valley Health
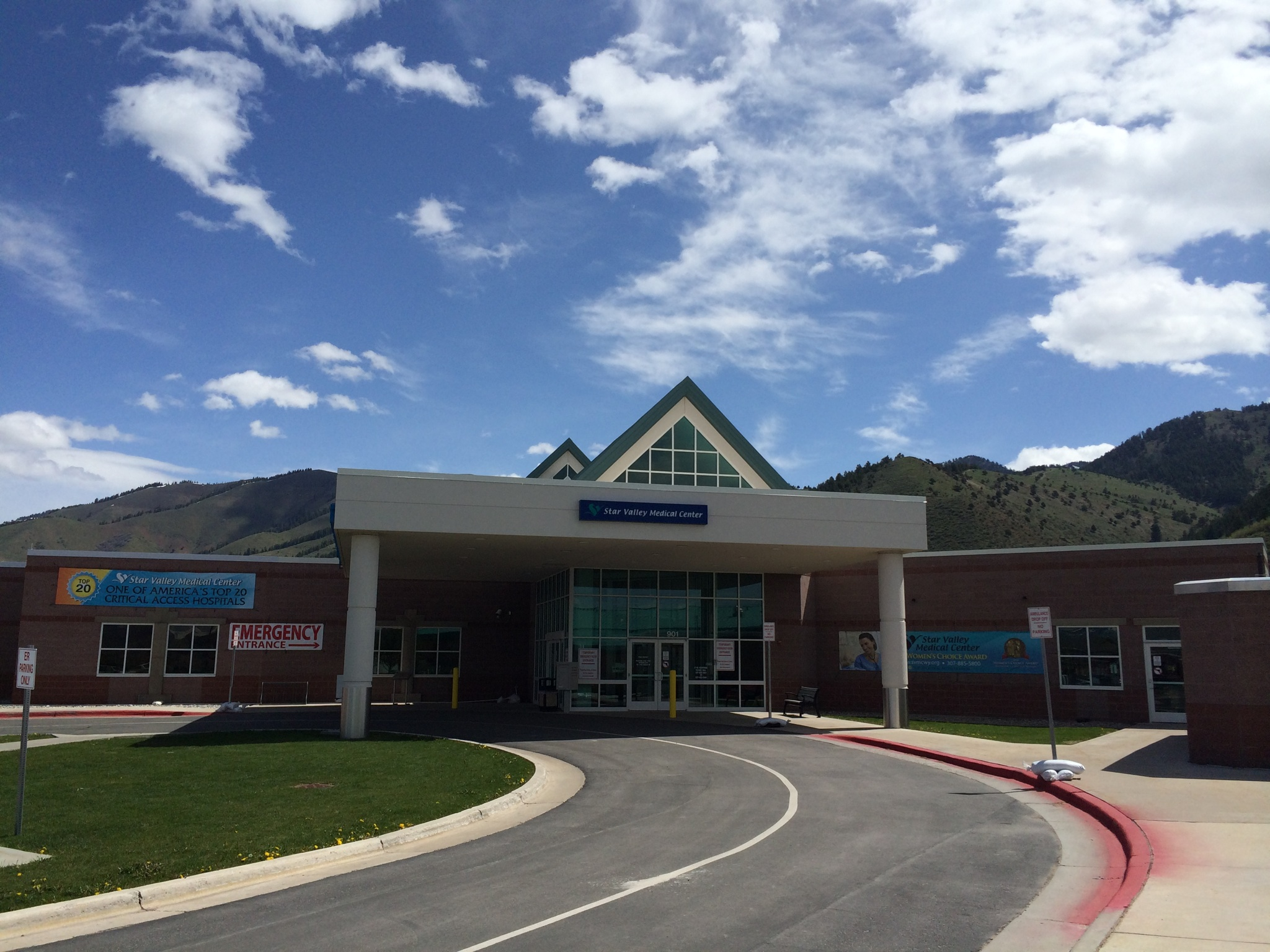

Geography
- Location: 901 Adams St Afton, WY 83110 United States, Afton, Wyoming, United States
- Coordinates: 42.71732°N 110.93041°W

Organization
- Care system: Public
- Type: Critical Access Hospital, Non-profit

Services
- Beds: 22

History
- Founded: New facility dedicated in 2003

Links
- Website: Official website
- Lists: Hospitals in Wyoming

Star Valley Health (North Lincoln County Hospital District) is a non-profit 22-bed Critical Access Hospital located in Afton, Wyoming. It serves Lincoln County. Star Valley Health was known as Star Valley Medical Center from 1999 until it was renamed in May 2019.

== Overview ==
Star Valley Health is the primary provider of healthcare in the area. The hospital is a Level 4 Trauma Center. Star Valley Health has transfer agreements with Eastern Idaho Regional Medical Center in Idaho Falls, Primary Children's Hospital in Salt Lake City, Portneuf Medical Center in Pocatello, Idaho, and Logan Regional Hospital in Logan, Utah. Bren Lowe is the current CEO of SVMC.

== Awards ==
In 2011 Star Valley Health was named a top 100 Rural Hospital, as well as a 5 star Medicare rated Care Center.

== History ==
Star Valley's medical services began with the early members of the Church of Jesus Christ of Latter-day Saints (LDS Church) who migrated to Star Valley from Salt Lake City. The first medical care in Star Valley happened around 1904 and often had several locations during the first few decades, one of the first locations being a kitchen. Dr. Perkes, whom the hospital's street is now named after, arrived in the 1950s to begin his medical work and served the community until his death in 2012.

In 1999 Star Valley Hospital, which was owned by Intermountain Healthcare (IHC) discontinued services in Star Valley. The community rallied together in order to keep medical services local, and reestablished as Star Valley Medical Center.

Star Valley Medical Center continued to grow and expanded its care to the surrounding areas of Alpine and Thayne while also adding a Long Term Care Facility and then building a brand new facility in 2003. Star Valley Medical Center added Orthopedics, Physical Therapy, a Sleep Lab, a new ER, and expanded its OR. In 2019, Star Valley Medical Center underwent a rebranding and renaming to reflect the direction of the organization, and became Star Valley Health.

== Star Valley Health Facilities ==
The Medical/Surgical floor has 22 beds including two Labor & Delivery rooms and two Tele-ICU rooms. The Care Center has 24 rooms.

Star Valley Health laboratory department processes most of the lab work for the hospital and the outlying clinics. The hospital has an eight-room Emergency Room, which includes three trauma rooms. The surgery department is composed of three surgical suites and two endoscopy suites.

In 2023, Star Valley Health enhanced its MRI (magnetic resonance imaging) system to provide sophisticated breast imaging capabilities aimed at detecting more breast cancers earlier.

== Expansion ==
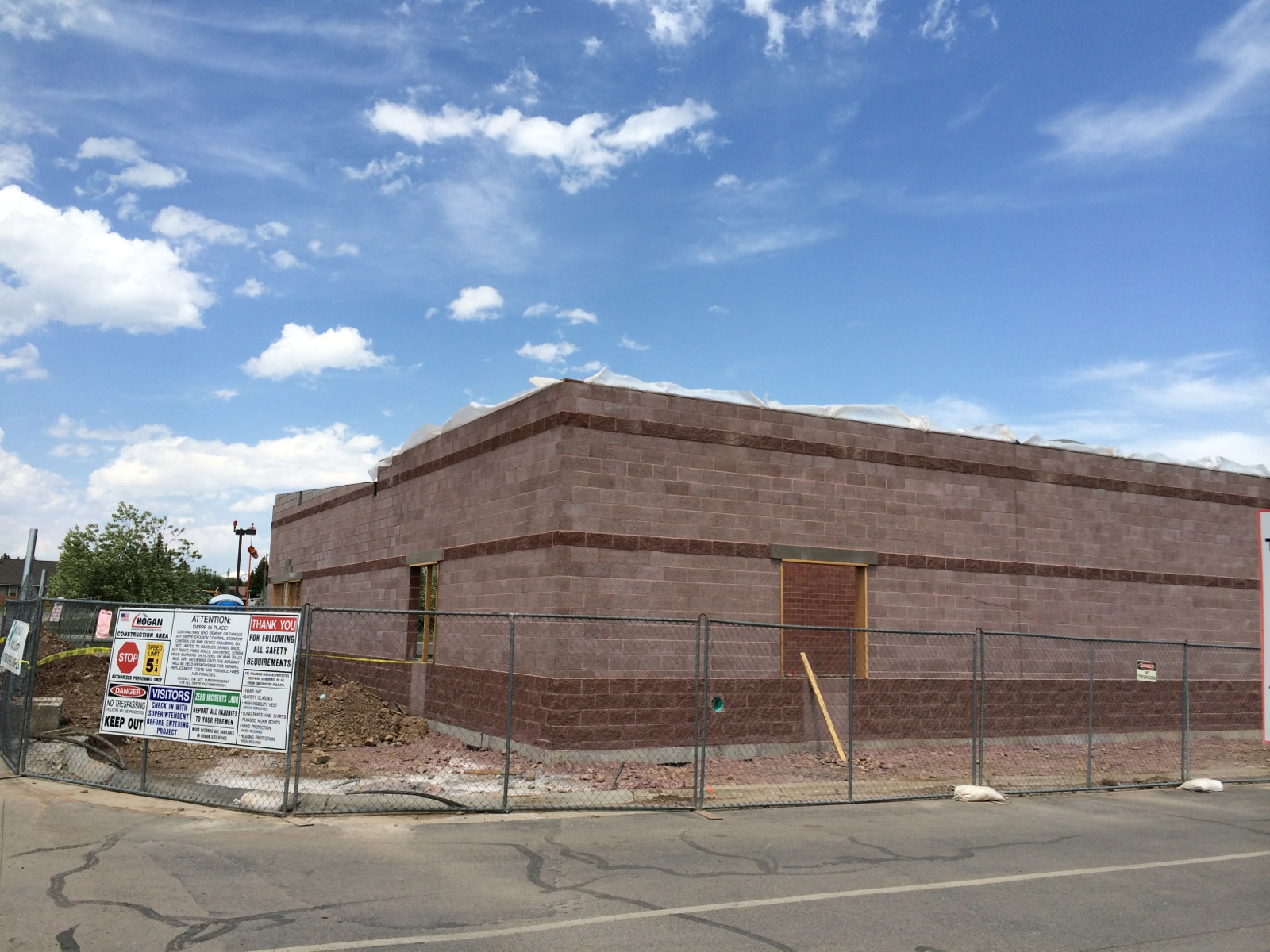
Expansion on the ER/OR as of June 2014

Star Valley Health now has clinics in the towns of Afton, Thayne, Alpine, and Cokeville, as well as urgent care clinics in both Afton and Alpine.

== Mountain West Orthopedics & Sports Medicine ==
Mountain West Orthopedics and Sports Medicine provides services in each of the clinics within Star Valley, and extend regionally to Bridger Valley, Evanston, Kemmerer, and Logan, Utah. Mountain West was founded in 2006 as Salt River Orthopedics, and was renamed in May 2019.

== Care Center ==
The Star Valley Care Center was founded in 1997 and currently has 24 beds. Star Valley Care Center consistently achieves a 5 Star rating from Centers for Medicare and Medicaid.

== Education ==
Star Valley Health is a clinical site for several universities including Weber State University and BYU-Idaho.
