= Albert E. Bradbury =

American politician (1917–2011)

Member of the Wyoming House of Representatives from Uinta County
- In office 1971–1972
- Preceded by: Nancy G. Wallace
- Succeeded by: Harry L. Harris

Personal details
- Born: Albert Edward Bradbury; May 1, 1917 Evanston, Wyoming, U.S.
- Died: January 4, 2011 (aged 93) Evanston, Wyoming, U.S.
- Party: Republican
- Relatives: Nancy G. Wallace (sister-in-law)
- Education: Stanford University

Albert Edward Bradbury (May 1, 1917 – January 4, 2011) was an American politician. A member of the Republican Party, he served in the Wyoming House of Representatives from 1971 to 1972.

== Life and career ==
Bradbury was born in Evanston, Wyoming, the son of Orlando Earl Bradbury and Louise Hinkle. He attended and graduated from Evanston High School. After graduating, he attended Stanford University, earning his master's degree in geology, which after earning his degree, he served in the armed forces in Belgium during World War II.

Bradbury served in the Wyoming House of Representatives from 1971 to 1972.

== Death ==
Bradbury died on January 4, 2011, in Evanston, Wyoming, at the age of 93.
