= Valley Hospital =

Several hospitals are called Valley Hospital:

== United States ==
- Valley Hospital, a former hospital in Palmer, Alaska, replaced by Mat-Su Regional Medical Center
- Valley Hospital, Phoenix, Arizona
- Carson Valley Hospital, Gardnerville, Nevada
- Valley Hospital Medical Center, Las Vegas, Nevada
- The Valley Hospital, Paramus, New Jersey
- Valley Hospital (Klamath Falls, Oregon), listed on the National Register of Historic Places
- Valley Hospital and Medical Center, Spokane Valley, Washington

== See also ==
- Valley Medical Center (disambiguation)
