= Cheyenne Regional Medical Center =

Hospital in Cheyenne, Wyoming, United States

Coordinates: 41°08′26″N 104°48′58″W

Geography
- Location: Cheyenne, Wyoming, United States

Organization
- Care system: County, Non-profit
- Type: Community
- Affiliated university: None

Services
- Emergency department: Level III trauma center
- Beds: 222

History
- Founded: 1867

Links
- Website: http://www.cheyenneregional.org/
- Lists: Hospitals in Wyoming

Cheyenne Regional Medical Center (CRMC) is a hospital located in Cheyenne, Wyoming, United States. CRMC is made up of several buildings and locations. As of 2013, it was Wyoming's largest health care system. It had 206 beds and was staffed by 1,850 employees, 168 of whom were doctors.

== History ==
In 1867 the Union Pacific Railroad established a tent hospital to treat workers injured during construction of the transcontinental railroad. Within a year, the City of Cheyenne purchased the tent hospital from the railroad for $125.00.

In 1882 or 1883 a new building was built at a cost of $21,000 at the corner of 23rd Street and Evans Avenue on land donated by the railroad to house the hospital, which at that time was named St. John's Hospital of Laramie County. The hospital would go through several name changes, including the Laramie County Memorial Hospital, Cheyenne Medical Center, and the current name, Cheyenne Regional Medical Center.

== See also ==
- List of hospitals in Wyoming
- List of trauma centers in the United States
