= Triangulation Point Draw Site District =

Historic district in Wyoming, United States

- Triangulation Point Draw Site District (48UT114; 48UT377; 48UT392; 48UT440)
- U.S. National Register of Historic Places
- U.S. Historic district
- Nearest city: Verne, Wyoming
- Area: 160 acres (65 ha)
- NRHP reference No.: 86002320
- Added to NRHP: September 16, 1986

The Triangulation Point Draw Site is an archeological site in Uinta County, Wyoming. The camp was occupied by Native Americans from both the Great Basin and the northwestern Plains during the Late Prehistoric period. Surface artifacts found at the site include chipped stone points and tools, ground stone tools, fire locations and organic stains. Buried artifacts include fire rings and habitation-related disturbances. Projectile points at the site include Plains side-notched, Rose Spring corner-notched and Late Prehistoric corner-notched points, as well as a Late Prehistoric small corner-notched point similar to those found in Mummy Cave, more than 200 miles (320 km) to the north.

The site was listed on the National Register of Historic Places in 1986.
