= Downtown Evanston Historic District =

Historic district in Wyoming, United States

- U.S. National Register of Historic Places
- U.S. Historic district
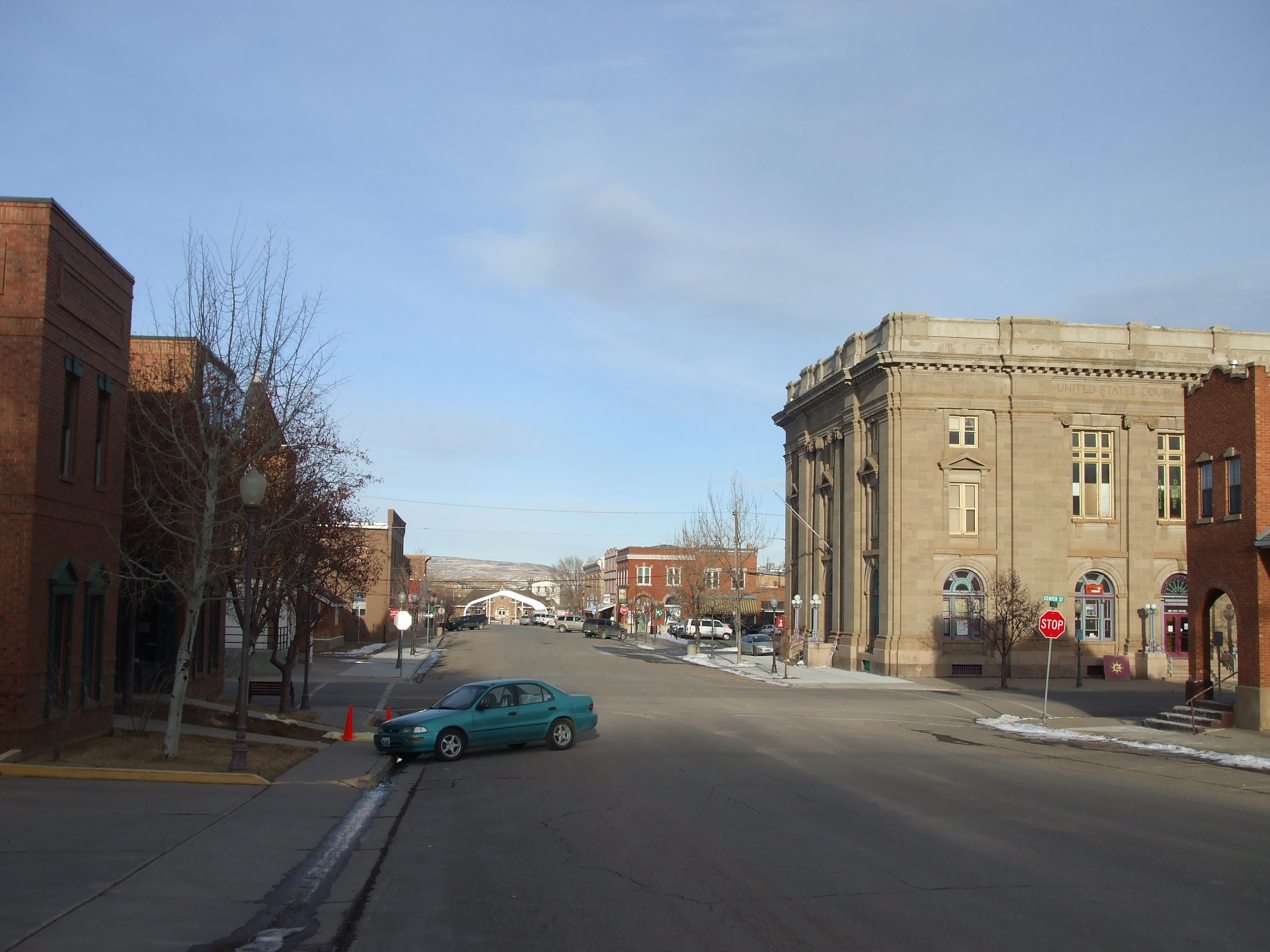

- Location within Wyoming Location within the United States
- Location: Roughly bounded by Center, 9th 11th, and Front Sts., Evanston, Wyoming
- Coordinates: 41°16′4″N 110°57′53″W
- Area: 17 acres (6.9 ha)
- Built: 1880
- NRHP reference No.: 83004307
- Added to NRHP: November 25, 1983

The Downtown Evanston Historic District in Evanston, Wyoming includes about sixty buildings in a compact downtown commercial district.

The bulk of the buildings in the district were built between 1880 and 1930 as the city grew in stature. Sustained by the railroads, coal and mining, Evanston's central business district reflected the area's prosperity. A later oil boom brought further development.

Significant buildings include the city hall, the courthouse-post office, Downs' Opera House and the Strand cinema.

Built in 1918 to show motion pictures, vaudeville and other live theatre, the Strand burned down in 2007. It was renovated and reopened as a community events venue in 2015.

The district was placed on the National Register of Historic Places in 1983.
