= Black and Orange Cabins =

- U.S. National Register of Historic Places
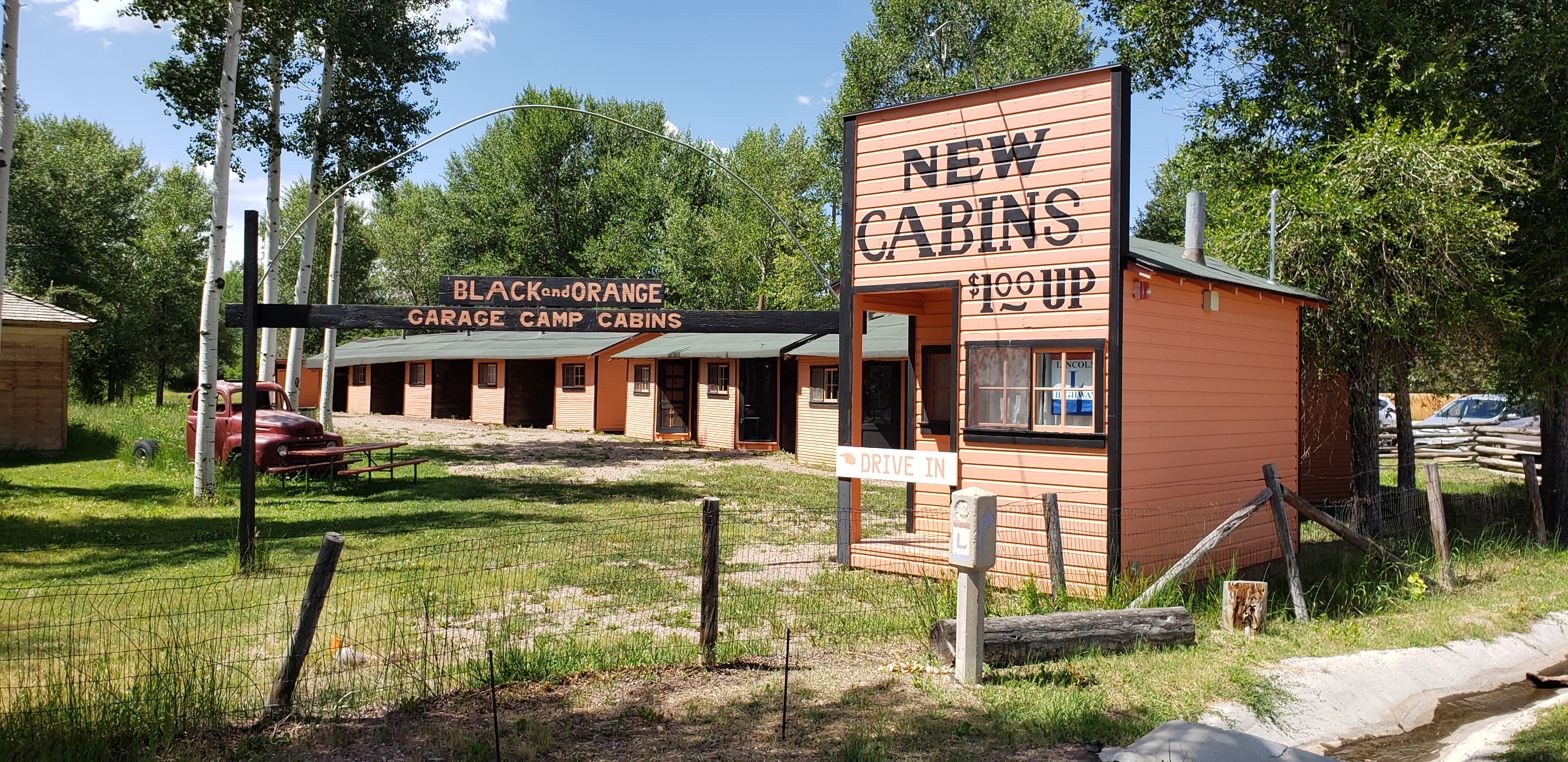

- Location within Wyoming Location within the United States
- Location: 37000 Business Rte. I 80 (Fort Bridger State Historic Site), Uinta County, Wyoming
- Nearest city: Fort Bridger, Wyoming
- Coordinates: 41.3186°N 110.3890°W
- NRHP reference No.: 100005191
- Added to NRHP: 2020-04-23

The Black and Orange Cabins are a motel constructed next to Fort Bridger in southwest Wyoming. The cabins were originally constructed in 1925 along the Lincoln Highway, giving automobile tourist lodging accommodations while travelling through Wyoming. The site was active from 1925 until 1936. It was sold to a new owner in 1941, but was likely never again opened. The site remained essentially abandoned from 1948 until 1996.

In 1996, the site was purchased by the Fort Bridger Historical Society and was then donated to the state, as it was located adjacent to the Fort Bridger historic site. The State of Wyoming began an extensive restoration project in 2007, including foundation stabilization of the cabins, and foundation, chimney, and roof repairs. This round of restoration was completed in June 2009.
