= A. V. Quinn House =

Historic house in Wyoming, United States

- U.S. National Register of Historic Places
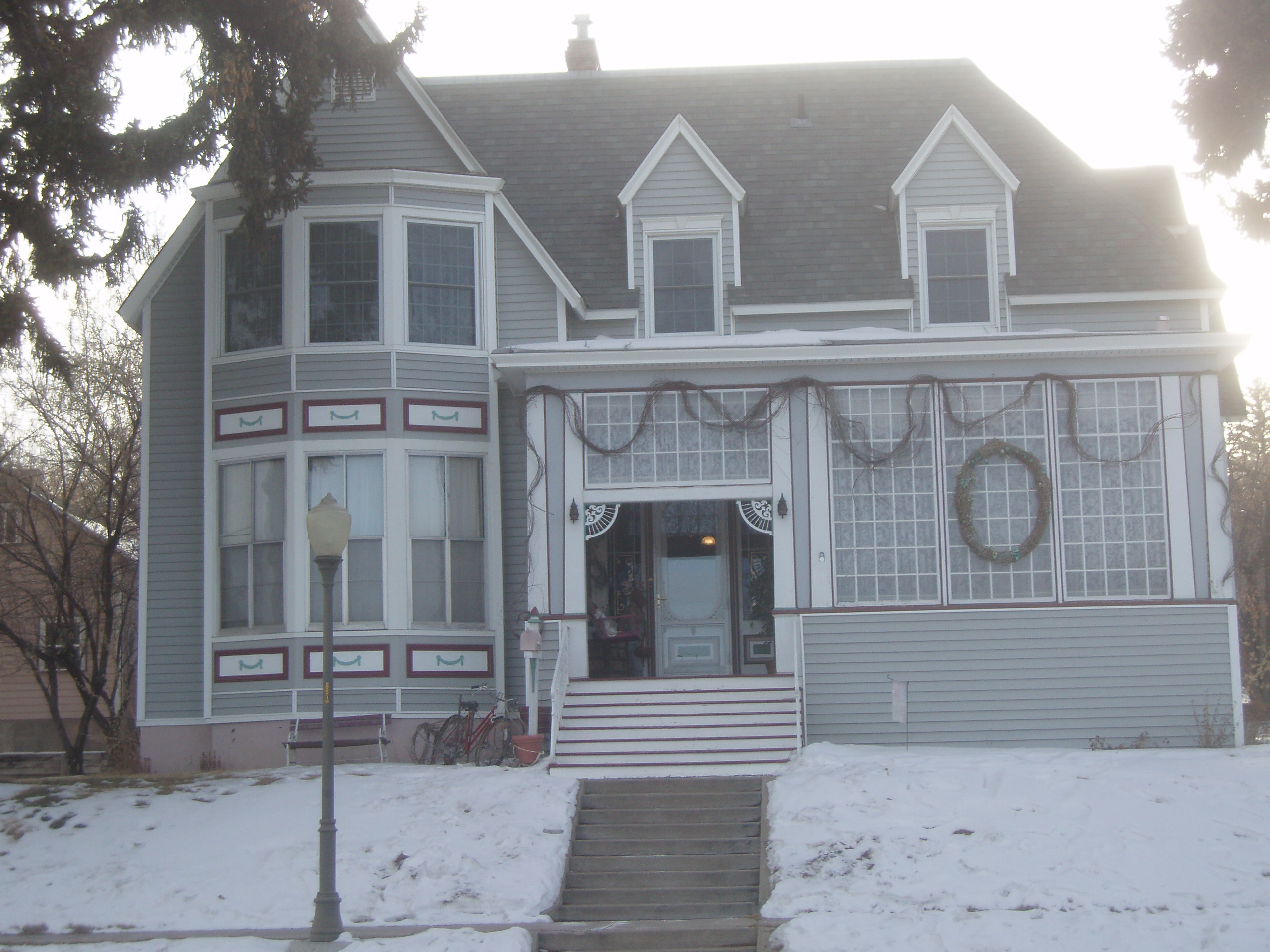

- Location within Wyoming Location within the United States
- Location: 1049 Center St., Evanston, Wyoming
- Coordinates: 41°16′3″N 110°58′1″W
- Area: less than one acre
- Built: 1883
- Architectural style: Late Victorian
- NRHP reference No.: 84003712
- Added to NRHP: September 13, 1984

The A.V. Quinn House, also known as Pine Gables, was built in Evanston, Wyoming in 1883. The Victorian style house is a largely unaltered representative of the Queen Anne style in Evanston.

== History ==
The house was built for Anthony V. Quinn, a local banker who arrived in Evanston in the 1870s. Quinn became a prosperous landowner and a politician in the Wyoming Territory. His wife, Mattie, was involved in the Women's Temperance Movement, and is reputed to haunt the house. The house features a prominent two-story oriel window. The front porch was enclosed in the 1930s.

Anthony V. Quinn was born in Illinois in 1831, moving to the California gold fields in 1858. Six years later he worked for Sisson and Wallace of San Francisco, moving east with the construction of the Central Pacific Railroad, which did business with Sisson and Wallace. Quinn started a bank for the railroad's Chinese laborers. After witnessing the symbolic completion of the Central Pacific at Promontory, Utah, Quinn settled in Evanston in 1870. Quinn and a partner bought out the local Sisson and Wallace operation in 1872 for $35,000 and went on to buy property around Evanston. The Quinns' new residence was built in 1880 for $10,000. In 1884 Quinn was elected to the Wyoming Territorial Legislature. Mattie led the local temperance movement and was a board member of the University of Wyoming. Mattie died in 1898. Anthony remarried and continued to live in the house until his death in 1913.

The A.V. Quinn House became a bed and breakfast in 1924 and continued in that use into the 1980s. It was listed on the National Register of Historic Places in 1984.
