= Brigham Young Oil Well =

- U.S. National Register of Historic Places
- Location within Wyoming Location within the United States
- Location: Northeastern quarter of the northeastern quarter of Section 4, Township 13, Range 119
- Nearest city: Evanston, Wyoming
- Coordinates: 41°8′15″N 110°50′10″W
- Area: 0.5 acres (0.20 ha)
- NRHP reference No.: 85000872
- Added to NRHP: April 25, 1985

The Brigham Young Oil Well is an oil seep near Evanston, Wyoming, United States that was discovered and used by the original Mormon expedition to Utah under the leadership of Brigham Young. The party used the oil on the surface to lubricate wagon wheel hubs, as polish, and as a poultice. After the party reached Great Salt Lake, a group returned and dug a well at the seep for other pioneers. The well served until 1869 when the Union Pacific Railroad brought petroleum to Salt Lake City.

It is believed that the trappers who built Fort Bridger were aware of the well; however, its first published description appeared in an 1848 guidebook written by a W. Clayton, who accompanied the initial Mormon expedition that had settled the Salt Lake Valley in the previous year. Oil is comparatively plentiful in the immediate vicinity of the Young Oil Well. Among the nearest is the White Oil Well, located on the Hilliard Flat elsewhere in the same township, which Judge C.M. White began working in 1867. Although he reached a depth of 480 feet (150 m), he abandoned it in 1868; an oil company from Evanston later attempted to obtain more petroleum from the same site, but their efforts were soon abandoned.

The issuance of oil at the Young Well is believed to be the result of an underlying fault. Although secondary to the larger Absaroka Fault, it is substantial enough to permit the ascension of petroleum from oil shale. Both Hilliard Flat wells yield heavy crude oil; a 1905 survey suggested that it is derived from the same source as the region's lighter Benton oil and proposed that the lighter content of the Hilliard Flat oil evaporates before it reaches the surface. This survey observed that oil seepage was then limited to just a few gallons per day.

In 1985, the site was listed on the National Register of Historic Places because of its importance to the pioneers of 1847.
