= Evanston Main Post Office =

- US Post Office--Evanston Main
- U.S. National Register of Historic Places
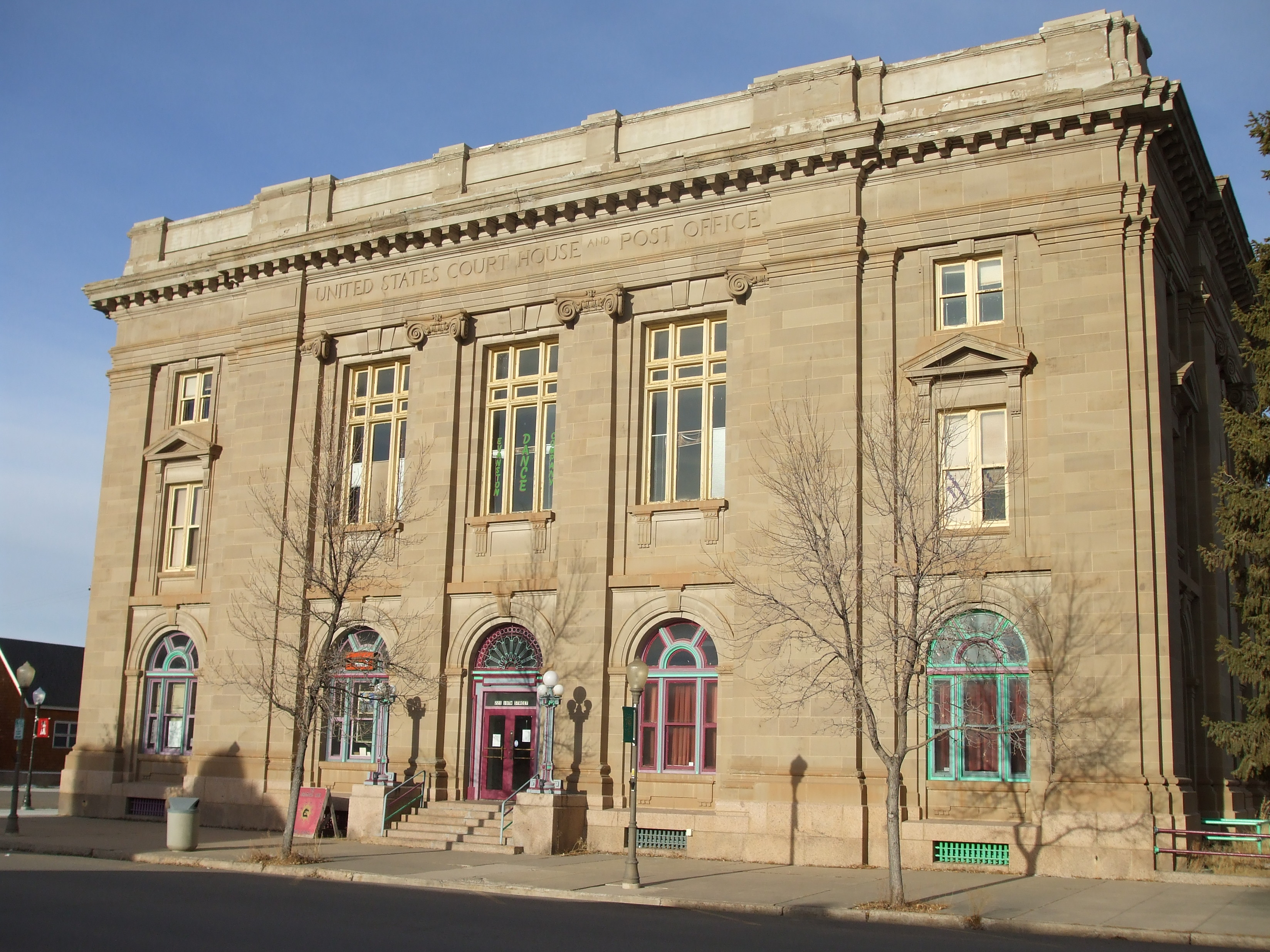
- The building now houses several businesses.

- Location within Wyoming Location within the United States
- Location: 221 Tenth St., Evanston, Wyoming
- Coordinates: 41°16′2″N 110°57′56″W
- Built: 1905
- Architect: US Department of the Treasury; James Knox Taylor
- Architectural style: Beaux Arts
- MPS: Historic US Post Offices in Wyoming, 1900--1941, TR
- NRHP reference No.: 87000790
- Added to NRHP: May 19, 1987

The Evanston Main Post Office in Evanston, Wyoming was built in 1905 as part of a facilities improvement program by the United States Post Office Department. The post office in Evanston was nominated to the National Register of Historic Places (NRHP) as part of a thematic study comprising twelve Wyoming post offices built to standardized USPO plans in the early twentieth century. It was NRHP-listed as U.S. Post Office-Evanston Main.
