= Bridger Antelope Trap =

- U.S. National Register of Historic Places
- Location: Uinta County, Wyoming, USA
- Nearest city: Evanston, Wyoming
- NRHP reference No.: 71000893
- Added to NRHP: 21 January 1971

The Bridger Antelope Trap is an archaeological site in Uinta County, Wyoming, associated with local Indigenous hunting practices. As an important example of hunting and gathering strategies, the site provides important clues to native subsistance in the past. The Wyoming State Historic Preservation Office nominated the antelope trap for the National Register of Historic Places (NRHP). The NRHP added the site to the Register on 21 January 1971.

Archaeological investigations, conducted in the late 1960s by Dr. George Frison of the University of Wyoming, indicated that hunters likely used the trap before 1850. However, its length of service is unknown; archaeologists believe that the site is associated with Indians of the Late Prehistoric Period. The Natives' technique, when hunting antelope, was to drive a herd into the long entrance of traps similar to the Bridger Antelope Trap. The opening, made of juniper wood, led to the trap proper, located at the base of a hill. This portion of the structure was circular and also constructed of juniper wood; hunters drove the antelope around the path until exhausted, at which time they would dispatch the exhausted prey.

The Bridger Antelope Trap covers close to 26 acres (110,000 m^{2}). Its entrance is arc-shaped and is close to 0.25 miles (400 m) in length, extending in a northeast-to-southwest direction across a smooth valley. The trap itself serves as an extension of the entrance and has a diameter of around 700 feet (210 m).
