= Uinta County Courthouse =

- U.S. National Register of Historic Places
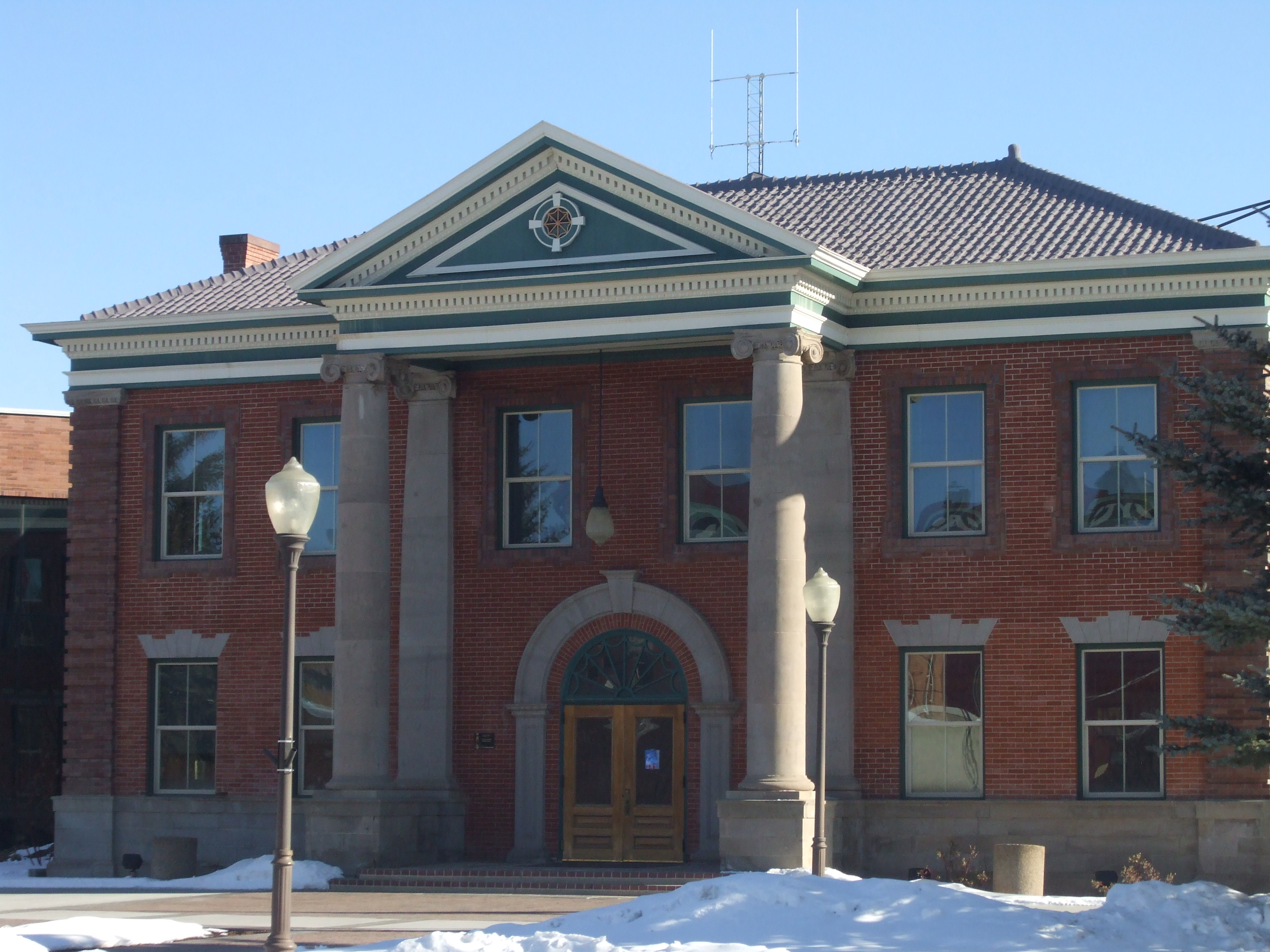

- Location within Wyoming Location within the United States
- Location: Courthouse Sq., Evanston, Wyoming
- Coordinates: 41°15′59″N 110°57′50″W
- Area: less than one acre
- Built: 1873
- Architect: Armstrong, W.H.; Et al.
- NRHP reference No.: 77001385
- Added to NRHP: July 14, 1977

The Uinta County Courthouse in Evanston, Wyoming is the oldest courthouse building in Wyoming, and one of the oldest permanent structures in Wyoming. Built in three stages, the first phase was a two-story jail, built in 1873. It was expanded with court facilities the following year, and in 1910 the main portion of the Georgian Revival structure was built with the present façade. Each phase showed an increasing attention to detail and ornament.

The original 1873 jail and 1874 courthouse were built by Evanston contractors Harvey Booth and William McDonald, assisted by mason William Durnford. McDonald was also the chairman of the Uinta County Commission; his contract stipulated that the work cost no more than $25,000. The 1910 addition was carried out by Evanston contractor W.H. Armstrong for $24,000.

The present front section of the courthouse is a brick structure, two stories high, with quoined corners and a central portico. The portico is supported by two unfluted Ionic stone columns, backed by two engaged Ionic pilasters of the same material on the building itself. The courthouse has a tiled roof with a dentiled cornice. The masonry walls of the 1873-1874 portion of the complex have been stained red by a mixture reportedly containing slaughterhouse blood and stale beer.

In 1887 a new jail was built nearby by the Pauly Jail Building and Manufacturing Company of St. Louis. This building was demolished in 1976 to make way for a new public safety facility. The new jail allowed the courthouse to expand its office and storage space.

The Uinta County Courthouse was listed on the National Register of Historic Places in 1977.
