= Wyoming State Hospital =

- U.S. National Register of Historic Places
- U.S. Historic district
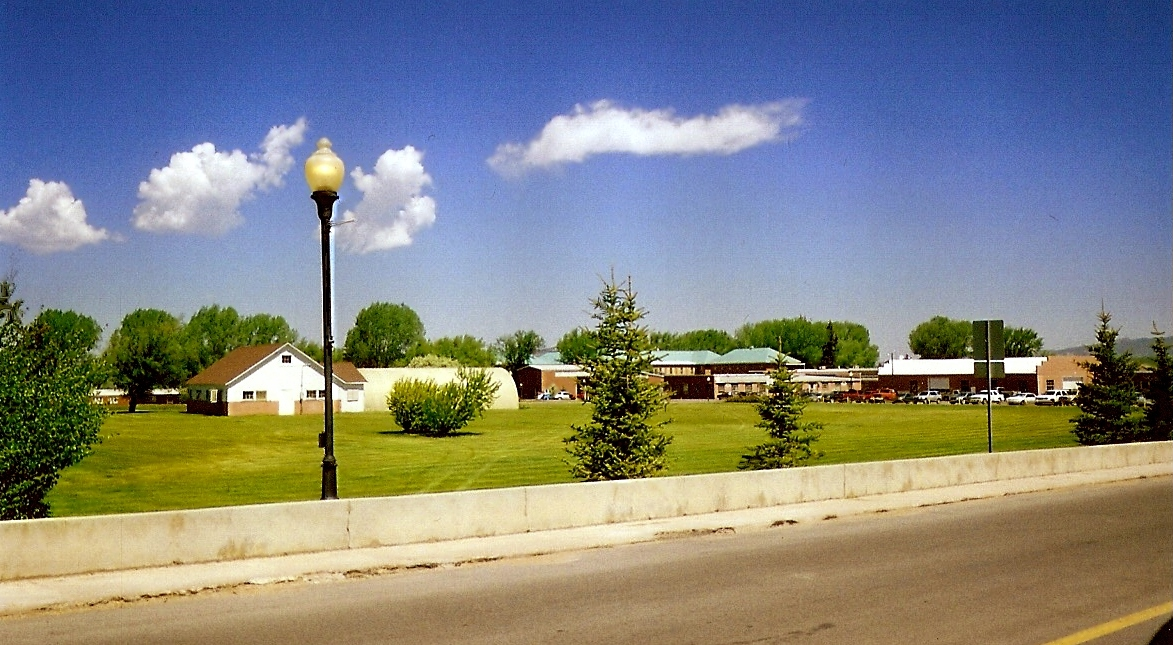
- View from the entrance

- Location within Wyoming Location within the United States
- Location: Evanston, Wyoming
- Coordinates: 41°15′48″N 110°56′58″W
- Built: 1887
- Architect: Dubois, William; Goodrich & Wilking; others
- Architectural style: Late Victorian, Late 19th and 20th Century Revivals
- NRHP reference No.: 03000084
- Added to NRHP: February 27, 2003

The Wyoming State Hospital, once known as the Wyoming State Insane Asylum, is located in Evanston, Wyoming, United States. The historic district occupies the oldest portion of the grounds and includes fifteen contributing buildings, including the main administrative building, staff and patient dormitories, staff apartments and houses, a cafeteria and other buildings, many of which were designed by Cheyenne, Wyoming architect William Dubois. Established in 1887, the historic buildings span the period 1907-1948. At one point it was common for new hall additions to be named after the counties in Wyoming. The recent addition of Aspen, Cottonwood, and Evergreen halls do not follow this trend.

Four buildings were designed by Casper architects Goodrich & Wilking.

== Description ==
=== Women's Building ===
The Women's Building is the oldest patient dormitory, built in 1908 with a 1913 addition by Bergstrom and Carruth in the late Victorian Romanesque style. The structure is now called Fremont Hall and Albany Hall. It consists of a central block with identical side wings. The two-story building measures 172 feet (52 m) by 57 feet (17 m), with 23,760 square feet (2,207 m^{2}) of area. The foundation is local rock-faced ashlar sandstone. Exterior walls are pressed brick. The bellcast hipped roof is metal in lieu of the original slate, with hipped dormers. Two 10-foot (3.0 m) by 45-foot (14 m) porches feature brick arcades topped by low brick walls. The interior includes a full basement with a corridor linking to other campus buildings. The first and second floors are laid out with a central corridor and rooms on each side. The interior is furnished with maple floors and beaded wood wainscot.

=== Men's Building ===
The original 1887 Building for Men was destroyed by fire, but the 1916 north wing addition by Bergstrom and Carruth remains. An administration wing and the south wing date to 1918, while the east wing was built in 1923. All were designed by William Dubois. The north and east wings are now called Natrona and Laramie Halls and the south wing is Converse/Weston Hall. The facility now houses the hospital's administration and planning offices, the library, and the occupational therapy department. The two-story building measures 297 by 160 feet (91 by 49 m) and contains 64,016 square feet (5,947.3 m^{2}). The reinforced concrete and steel building is faced with brick with stone-jointed stucco on secondary elevations. The hipped roof is covered with metal. A one-story classical portico with stone columns forms the building's focus. On the interior, wood floors remain under modern carpet. The wings have partial basements while the administrative wing has a full basement with a connection to the underground campus corridor system, connecting to the Women's Building through the north wing and to Whalen Hall through the east wing. Main floors have central corridors with rooms to each side.

=== Building for Special Male Patients ===
This one story building was designed by Dubois and built in 1918 in a Classical Revival style. Known as Sheridan Hall it once housed Adolescent Services but has since discontinued this service. The H-shaped building measures 57 by 160 feet (17 by 49 m) and totals 8,058 square feet (748.6 m^{2}). The exterior is faced with brick with a hipped metal roof. A central hall runs the length of the building, flanked by large dormitory rooms.

=== New Building for Women ===
Designed by Dubois, the building was built in 1926 by George Whitemyer and Sons of Ogden, Utah. Known as Lincoln, Platte and Washakie Halls, the L-shaped two-story building is designed in the Classical Revival style. It measures 120 feet (37 m) by 100 feet (30 m) with 22,128 square feet (2,055.8 m^{2}). Resting on a painted stone foundation, it is faced in brick. The New Building for Women features an arcaded porch. The interior is a central corridor arrangement with rooms in a variety of sizes to either side.

=== Building for Employees ===
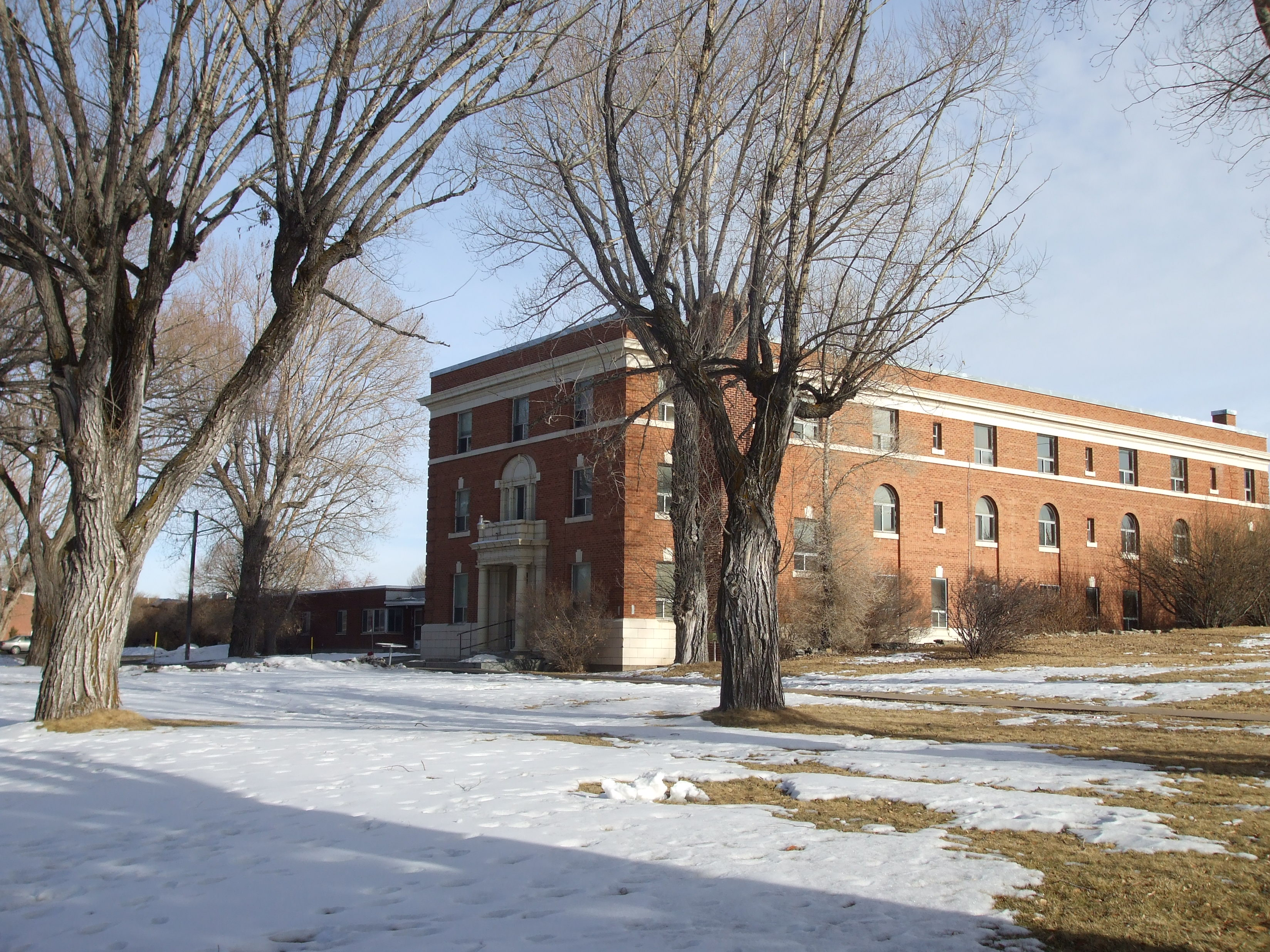
View from the west

Known as Clark Hall, the Building for Employees is another Dubois building built by Carruth. The 19,200 square feet (1,780 m^{2}) building features cast stone columns and pilasters supporting a full entablature.

=== Building for the Criminally Insane ===
A Dubois design, the 1935 building is known as Carbon and Johnson Halls. The east portion now houses offices for Adolescent Services, while the west portion houses classrooms. The H-shaped building is about 77 by 142 feet (23 by 43 m) containing 24,640 square feet (2,289 m^{2}). The brick building is detailed with terra cotta and faced with wire-cut brick.

Other buildings include the laundry, a chicken granary and a calf barn, all now used for shops or storage, a carpenter shop and paint shop.

The hospital was placed on the National Register of Historic Places in 2003.
