= St. Paul's Episcopal Church (Evanston, Wyoming) =

Historic church in Wyoming, United States

- U.S. National Register of Historic Places
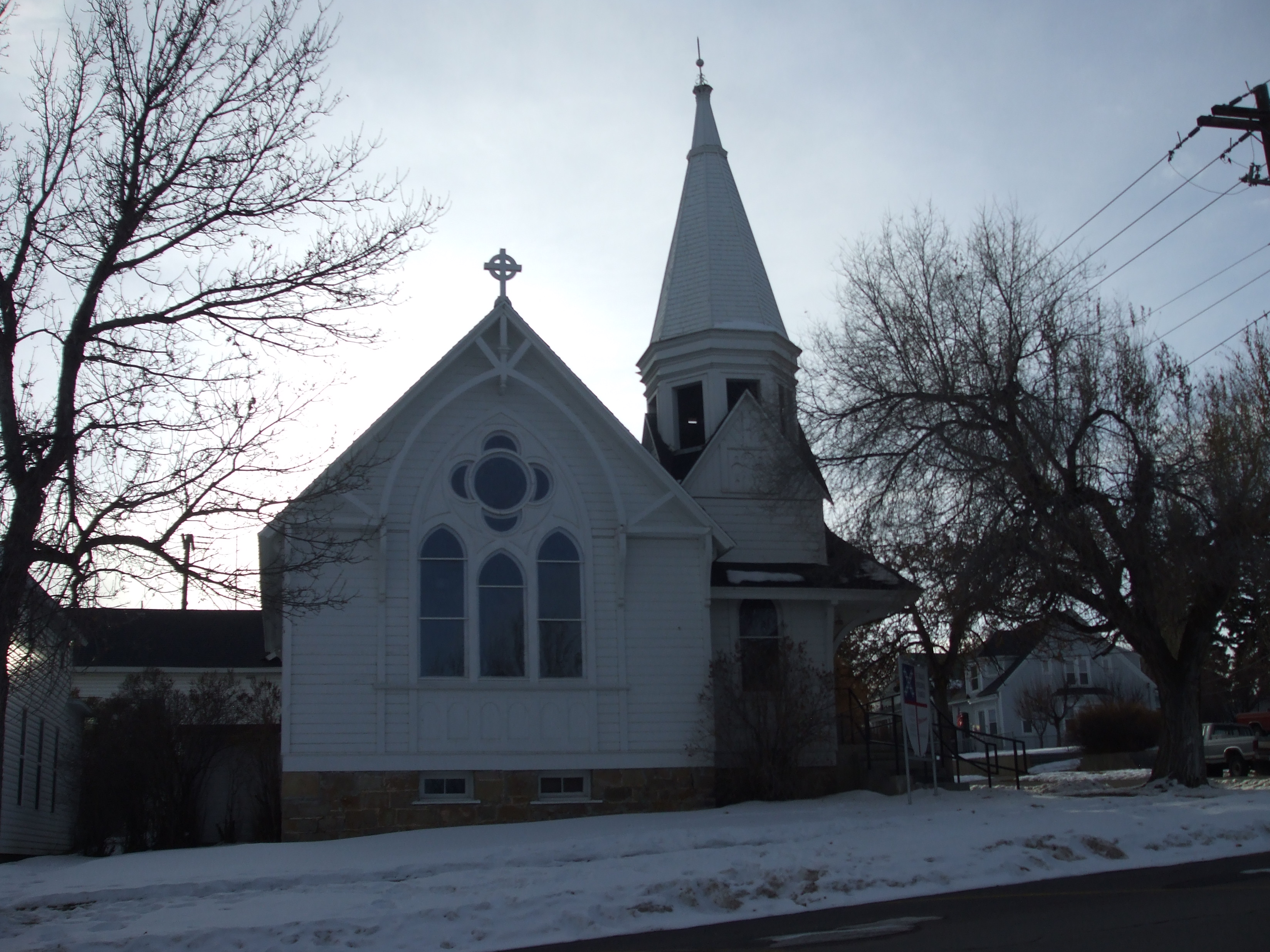

- Location within Wyoming Location within the United States
- Location: 10th and Sage Sts., Evanston, Wyoming
- Coordinates: 41°15′57″N 110°58′1″W
- Area: less than one acre
- Built: 1884
- Architectural style: Gothic, Carpenter Gothic style
- NRHP reference No.: 80004057
- Added to NRHP: November 17, 1980

St. Paul's Episcopal Church in Evanston, Wyoming is a historic parish of the Episcopal Church in the Carpenter Gothic style. The church was built in 1884–1885, and at the time was the only Protestant church in a community dominated by Mormons and Catholics. In its early history it hosted Lutherans, Methodists and Presbyterians in addition to its Episcopalian congregation.

The simple plan features a nave entered from a side narthex, with an apse set apart from the nave by a Gothic arch. The windows are pointed arches with quatrefoils. Construction is wood frame with drop or beveled siding. The detailing is principally plain flat material, with some evidence of Stick Style influence.

St. Paul's Episcopal Church was listed on the National Register of Historic Places in 1980.
