= Evanston, Wyoming =

- City
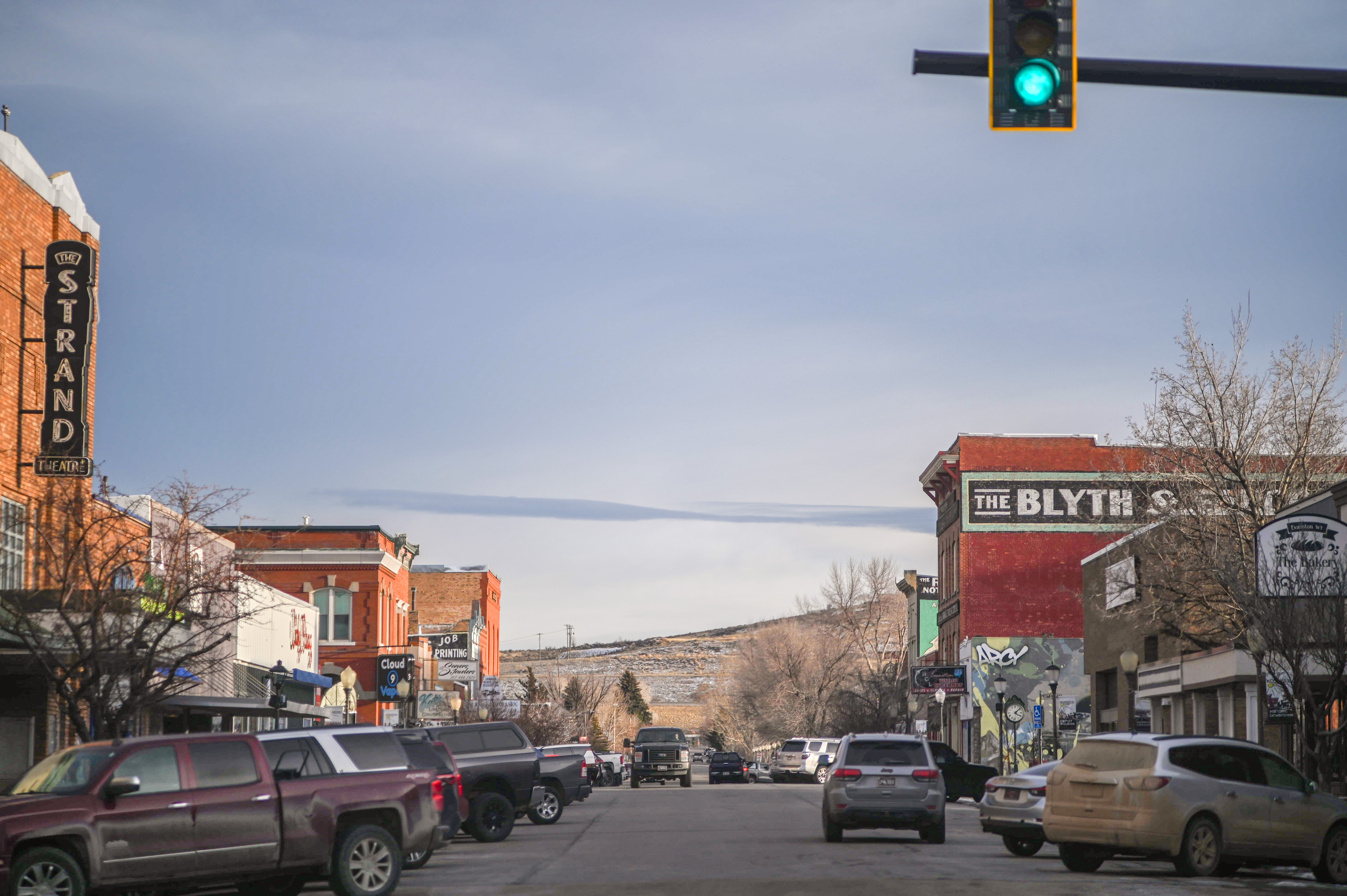
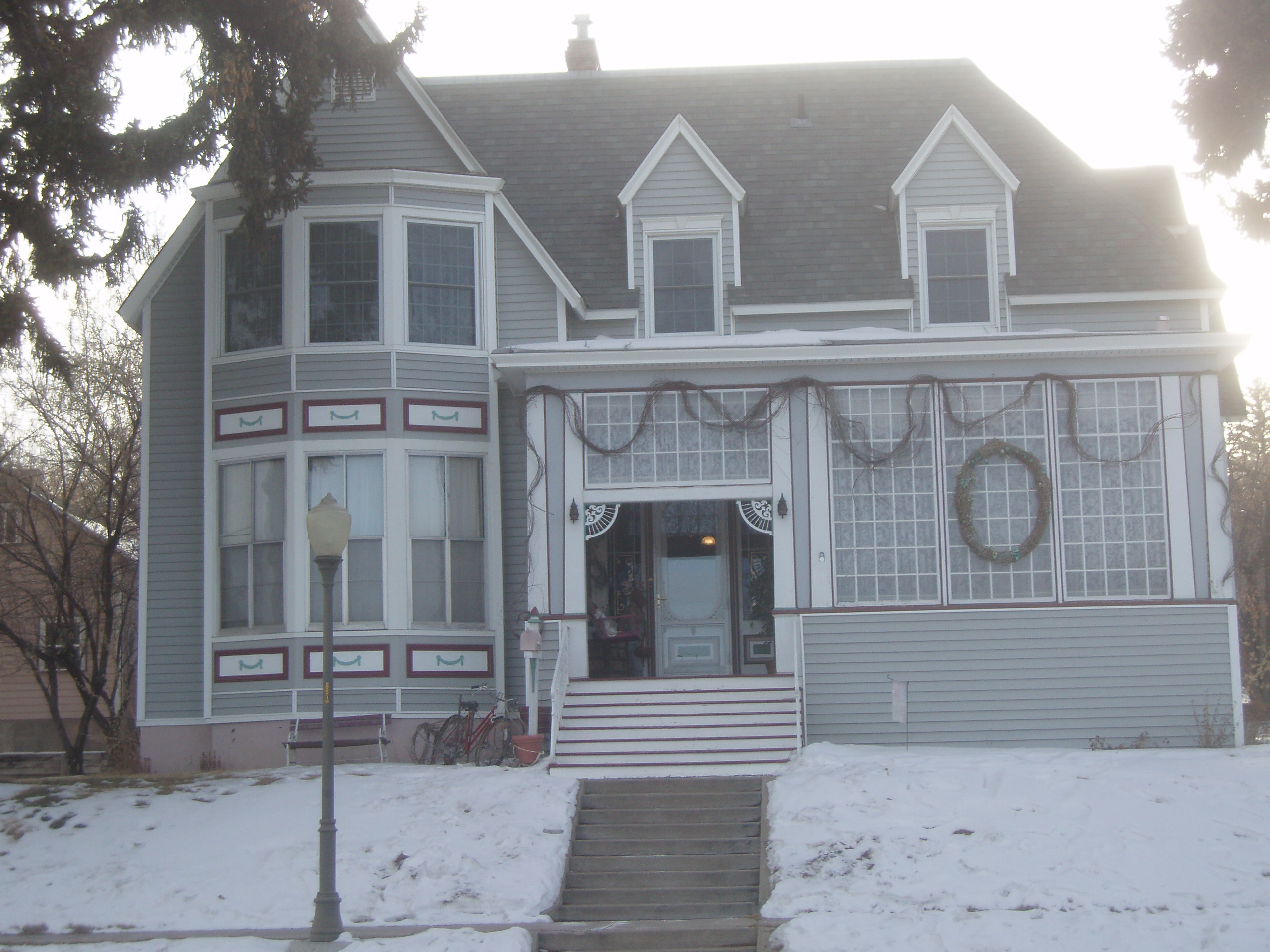
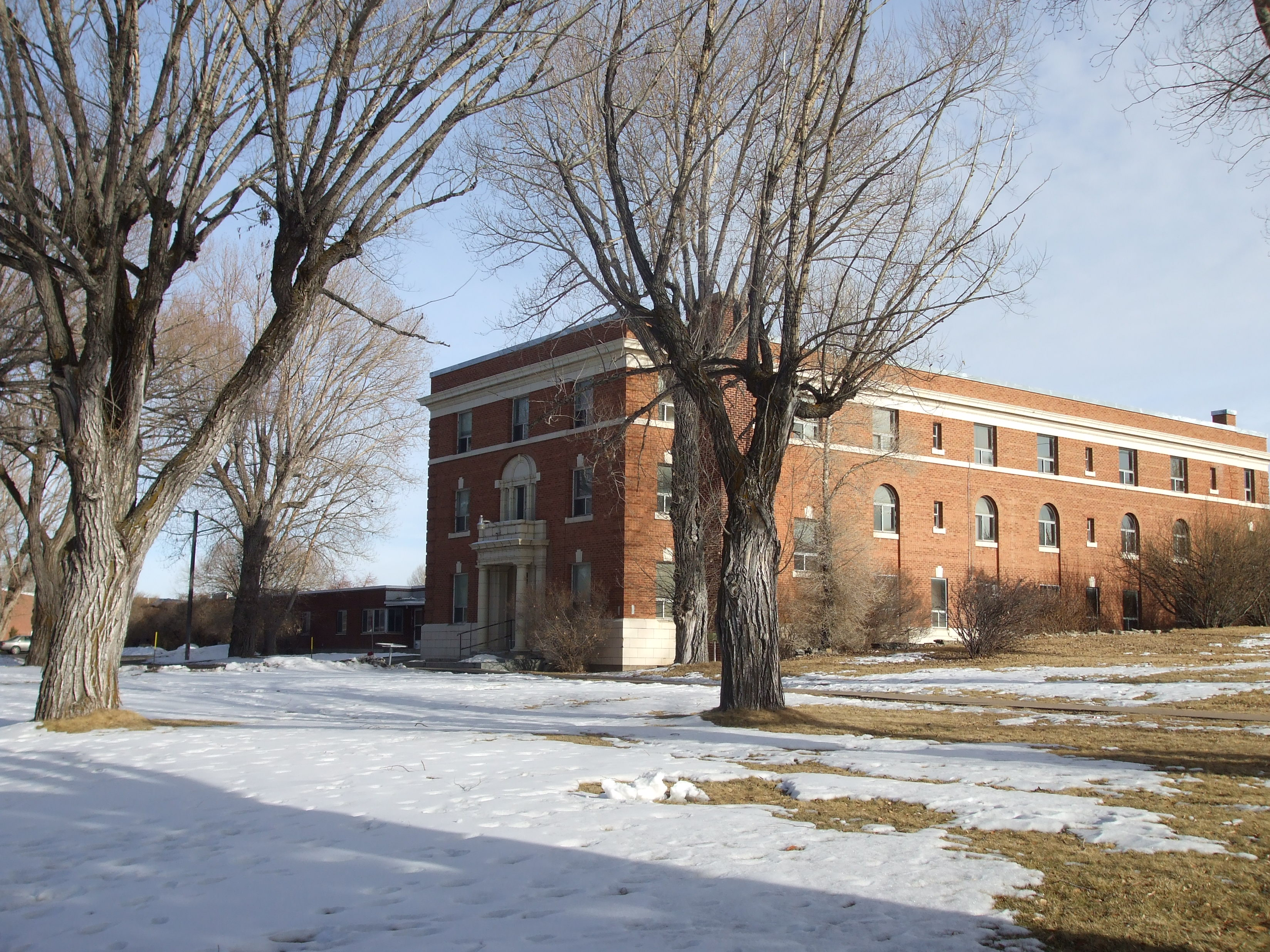
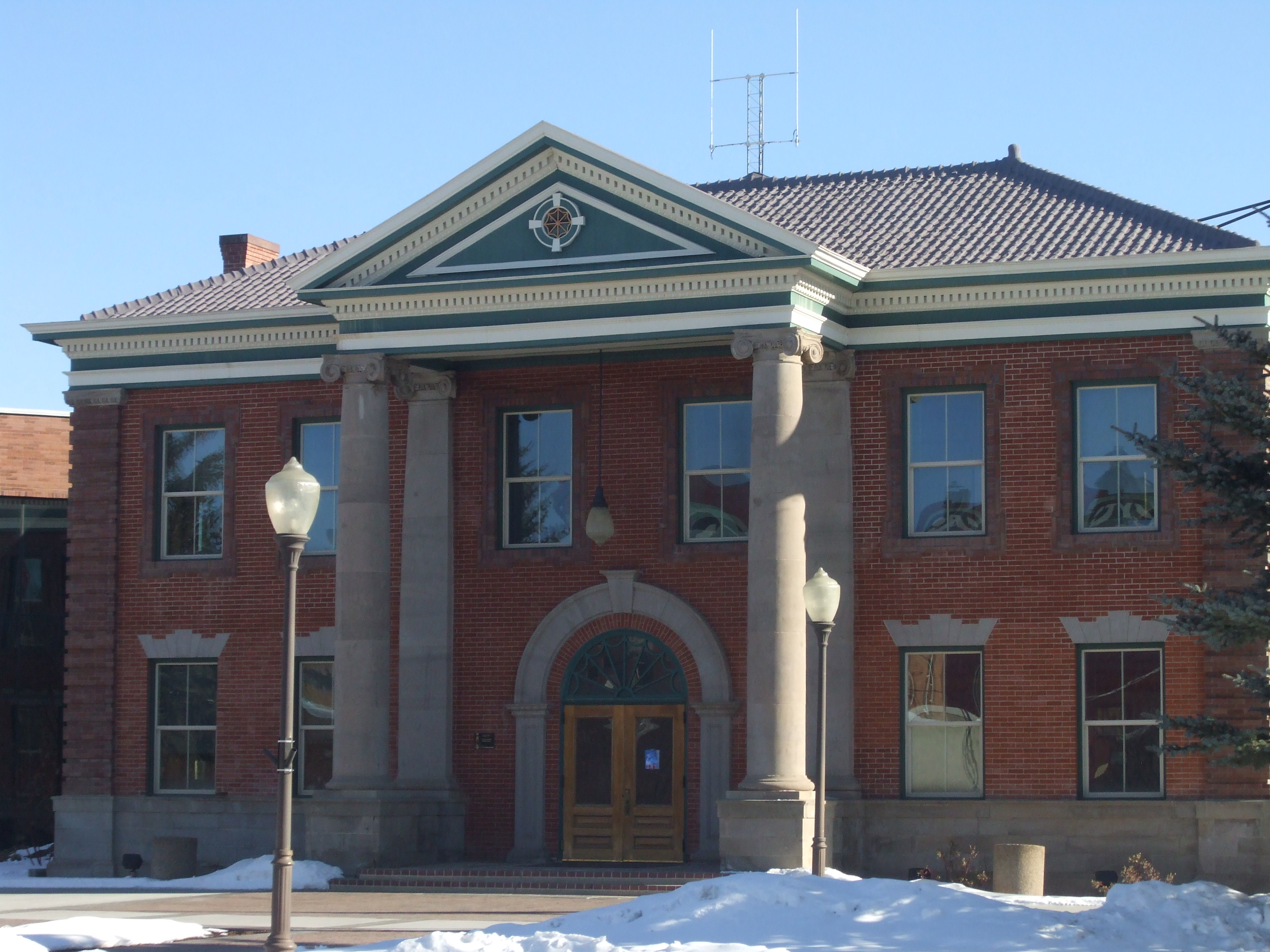
- Downtown Evanston A. V. Quinn House Wyoming State Hospital Uinta County Courthouse
- Motto(s): Fresh Air, Freedom and Fun
- Location of Evanston in Uinta County, Wyoming
- Coordinates: 41°15′05″N 110°58′55″W
- Country: United States
- State: Wyoming
- County: Uinta
- Founded: November 1868
- Incorporated: 1869

Area
  - Total: 10.305 sq mi (26.690 km^{2})
  - Land: 10.265 sq mi (26.587 km^{2})
  - Water: 4.044 sq mi (10.474 km^{2})
- Elevation: 6,749 ft (2,057 m)

Population (2020)
  - Total: 11,747
  - Density: 1,150.7/sq mi (444.29/km^{2})
- Time zone: UTC−7 (Mountain (MST))
  - Summer (DST): UTC−6 (MDT)
- ZIP Codes: 82930, 82931
- Area code: 307
- FIPS code: 56-25620
- GNIS feature ID: 2410468
- Highways: I-80, US-189, SR-89 and SR-150
- Sales tax: 5.0%
- Website: evanstonwy.org

Evanston is a city in and the county seat of Uinta County, Wyoming, United States. The population was 11,747 at the 2020 census. It is located near the border with Utah.

The settlement was founded in 1868 as a divisional point on the transcontinental railroad constructed by Union Pacific. Evanston was later a stop on the Lincoln Highway and is bisected by Interstate 80, a major transcontinental highway.

== History ==
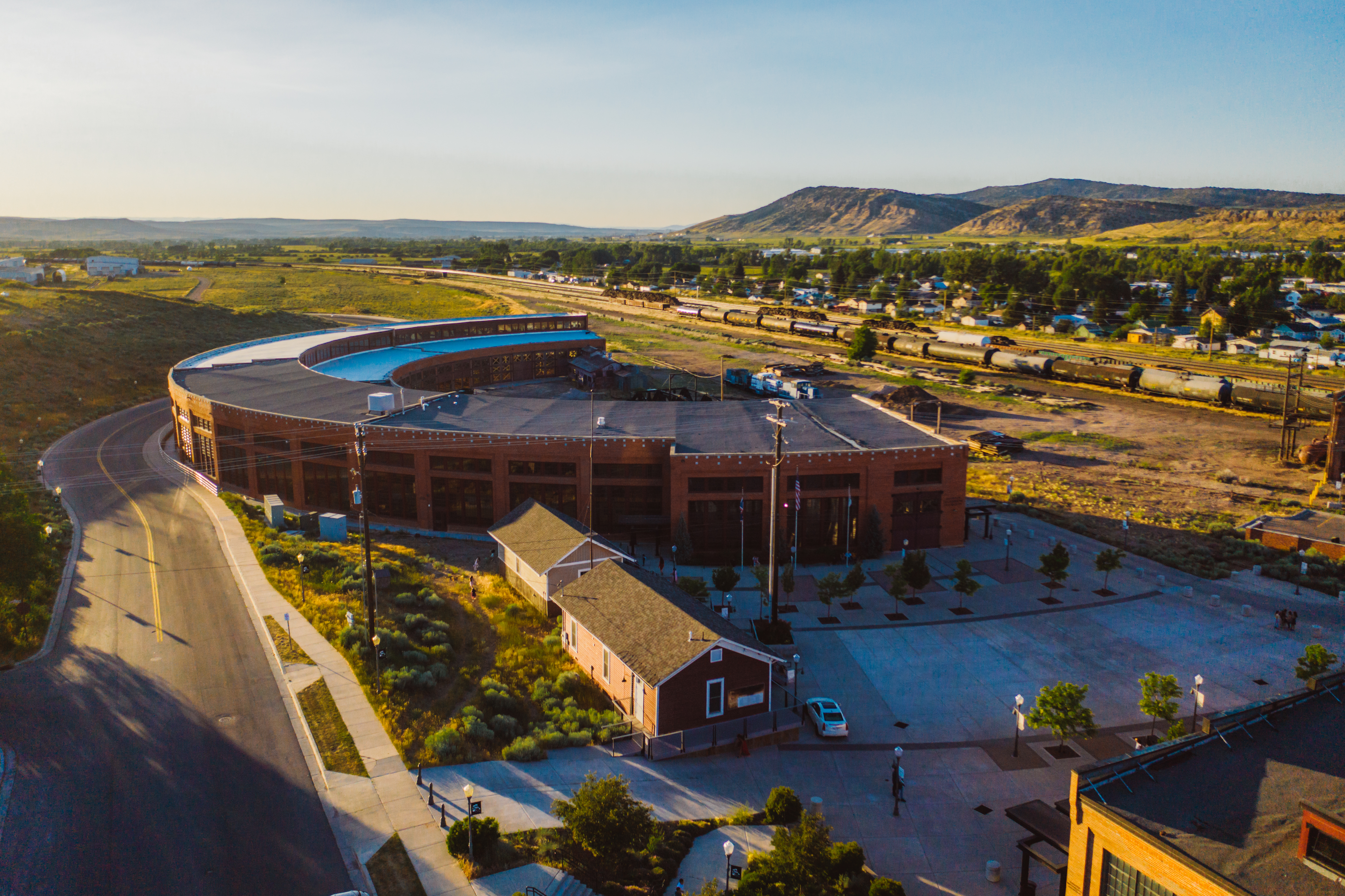
The Evanston Roundhouse

Evanston was named after James A. Evans, a civil engineer for the Union Pacific Railroad. Another source maintains it is named for John Evans, second Governor of the Territory of Colorado. The town was founded during the construction of the first transcontinental railroad. The railroad arrived in the area in November 1868, and Harvey Booth opened a saloon/restaurant in a tent near what is now Front Street. By December the rails had reached Evanston and the first train arrived December 16. However, orders were later handed down by the railroad managers to move the end of the line 12 miles west, to Wahsatch. Within three days, most all of Evanston had moved to Wasatch. It appeared that Evanston would become another "end of the tracks" town. In June 1869 headquarters returned to Evanston and it continued to grow. Later in 1871, a machine shop and roundhouse were constructed, giving Evanston a longevity not shared by many other railroad towns.

Abundant timber and water along the Bear River made Evanston a refueling station for cross-country locomotives. Coal was mined in Almy, a few miles north of Evanston. Similar to other railroad towns in Wyoming, early Evanston had a large population of Chinese Railroad Workers – in Evanston they lived on the north side of the railroad tracks in a small "China town." Over time, the Chinese population dwindled; the last two members of the first generation of immigrants died in the 1930s.

Evanston was a major stop on the Lincoln Highway. The highway ran east to west from East Service Rd to Bear River Dr, on Front St to Harrison Dr, to Wasatch Rd southwest to Echo Canyon in Utah. It can still be seen along Interstate 80, which follows the railroad tracks in this area.

Evanston underwent massive growth and change during an oil boom in the 1980s. Recent drilling for natural gas has also revitalized the economy of the area. Union Tank Car works on railroad tank cars near the Union Pacific Railroad Complex, locally referred to as the old roundhouse. There are restored railroad buildings, including a roundhouse, in the downtown area. One of the more recent restorations include 1011 Front Street. This building, located in historic downtown Evanston, is across the street from the museum in Depot Square. Another restoration project included the rebuilding of the Joss house in Depot Square in 1990; the original had been destroyed in a fire in 1922.

== Geography ==
Interstate 80/US-189 and State Routes 89 and 150 serve the city.

According to the United States Census Bureau, the city has an area of 10.305 square miles (26.69 km^{2}), of which 10.265 square miles (26.59 km^{2}) is land and 0.040 square miles (0.10 km^{2}) is water.

Evanston has a continental climate (Köppen climate classification Dfb) with long, cold, dry winters and short, warm, slightly more humid summers.

Climate data for Evanston, Wyoming, 1991–2020 normals, extremes 1890–present
Month	Jan	Feb	Mar	Apr	May	Jun	Jul	Aug	Sep	Oct	Nov	Dec	Year
Record high °F (°C)	57 (14)	70 (21)	75 (24)	82 (28)	88 (31)	94 (34)	99 (37)	94 (34)	93 (34)	80 (27)	69 (21)	64 (18)	99 (37)
Mean maximum °F (°C)	44.8 (7.1)	47.5 (8.6)	59.5 (15.3)	69.7 (20.9)	76.1 (24.5)	83.7 (28.7)	89.1 (31.7)	86.5 (30.3)	80.4 (26.9)	72.8 (22.7)	60.0 (15.6)	48.4 (9.1)	89.5 (31.9)
Mean daily maximum °F (°C)	32.6 (0.3)	34.5 (1.4)	44.1 (6.7)	53.1 (11.7)	63.1 (17.3)	73.2 (22.9)	81.2 (27.3)	79.6 (26.4)	70.7 (21.5)	57.9 (14.4)	43.3 (6.3)	32.7 (0.4)	55.5 (13.1)
Daily mean °F (°C)	21.8 (−5.7)	24.0 (−4.4)	32.6 (0.3)	40.2 (4.6)	48.9 (9.4)	57.1 (13.9)	64.4 (18.0)	63.2 (17.3)	54.7 (12.6)	43.7 (6.5)	31.2 (−0.4)	21.9 (−5.6)	42.0 (5.5)
Mean daily minimum °F (°C)	11.1 (−11.6)	13.4 (−10.3)	21.1 (−6.1)	27.2 (−2.7)	34.6 (1.4)	40.9 (4.9)	47.6 (8.7)	46.7 (8.2)	38.6 (3.7)	29.5 (−1.4)	19.1 (−7.2)	11.1 (−11.6)	28.4 (−2.0)
Mean minimum °F (°C)	−8.5 (−22.5)	−6.8 (−21.6)	3.5 (−15.8)	14.1 (−9.9)	23.0 (−5.0)	30.3 (−0.9)	37.7 (3.2)	36.9 (2.7)	26.1 (−3.3)	14.5 (−9.7)	−0.5 (−18.1)	−7.2 (−21.8)	−14.0 (−25.6)
Record low °F (°C)	−35 (−37)	−38 (−39)	−30 (−34)	−7 (−22)	9 (−13)	19 (−7)	24 (−4)	23 (−5)	5 (−15)	−8 (−22)	−22 (−30)	−34 (−37)	−38 (−39)
Average precipitation inches (mm)	0.84 (21)	0.60 (15)	0.74 (19)	0.98 (25)	1.89 (48)	1.13 (29)	0.77 (20)	1.10 (28)	1.17 (30)	1.15 (29)	1.04 (26)	0.71 (18)	12.12 (308)
Average snowfall inches (cm)	13.2 (34)	8.1 (21)	5.0 (13)	2.0 (5.1)	1.0 (2.5)	0.2 (0.51)	0.0 (0.0)	0.0 (0.0)	0.3 (0.76)	1.6 (4.1)	6.1 (15)	9.8 (25)	47.3 (120.97)
Average precipitation days (≥ 0.01 in)	5.1	6.1	5.1	7.1	7.1	5.7	4.3	5.9	5.4	5.7	5.9	6.1	69.5
Average snowy days (≥ 0.1 in)	4.6	3.9	2.0	0.9	0.4	0.0	0.0	0.0	0.1	0.9	4.1	4.1	21.0
Source 1: NOAA (snow/snow days 1981–2010)
Source 2: National Weather Service

== Demographics ==
Historical population
Census	Pop.	Note	%±
1870	77		—
1880	1,277		1,558.4%
1890	1,995		56.2%
1900	2,110		5.8%
1910	2,583		22.4%
1920	3,479		34.7%
1930	3,075		−11.6%
1940	3,605		17.2%
1950	3,863		7.2%
1960	4,901		26.9%
1970	4,462		−9.0%
1980	6,265		40.4%
1990	10,903		74.0%
2000	11,507		5.5%
2010	12,359		7.4%
2020	11,747		−5.0%
2023 (est.)	11,807		0.5%
U.S. Decennial Census; 1870–2020 Censuses; 2020 Census

As of 2022, Evanston has an estimated median household income of $70,825; 6.4% of the city's population lives at or below the poverty line (down from previous ACS surveys). The city has a 68.0% employment rate, with 17.6% of the population holding a bachelor's degree or higher and 93.3% holding a high school diploma.

=== 2020 census ===
Evanston, Wyoming – racial and ethnic composition (NH = Non-Hispanic) Note: the US Census treats Hispanic/Latino as an ethnic category. This table excludes Latinos from the racial categories and assigns them to a separate category. Hispanics/Latinos can be of any race.
Race	Number	Percentage
White (NH)	9,440	80.4%
Black or African American (NH)	44	0.4%
Native American or Alaska Native (NH)	72	0.6%
Asian (NH)	79	0.7%
Pacific Islander (NH)	18	0.2%
Some Other Race (NH)	55	0.5%
Mixed race or multiracial (NH)	422	3.6%
Hispanic or Latino	1,617	13.8%
Total	11,747	100.0%

As of the 2020 census, there were 11,747 people, 4,555 households, and 2,980 families residing in the city. The population density was 1,141.7 inhabitants per square mile (440.8/km^{2}). The median age was 36.0 years. 28.4% of residents were under the age of 18 and 14.1% were 65 years of age or older. For every 100 females there were 100.5 males, and for every 100 females age 18 and over there were 96.3 males age 18 and over. 95.8% of residents lived in urban areas, while 4.2% lived in rural areas. Of those 4,555 households, 34.0% had children under the age of 18 living in them. Of all households, 48.1% were married-couple households, 19.4% were households with a male householder and no spouse or partner present, and 25.6% were households with a female householder and no spouse or partner present. About 29.9% of all households were made up of individuals and 10.7% had someone living alone who was 65 years of age or older. There were 5,166 housing units, of which 11.8% were vacant. The homeowner vacancy rate was 2.9% and the rental vacancy rate was 17.2%.

Racial composition as of the 2020 census
Race	Number	Percent
White	9,870	84.0%
Black or African American	57	0.5%
American Indian and Alaska Native	126	1.1%
Asian	83	0.7%
Native Hawaiian and Other Pacific Islander	18	0.2%
Some other race	760	6.5%
Two or more races	833	7.1%
Hispanic or Latino (of any race)	1,617	13.8%

=== 2010 census ===
As of the 2010 census, there were 12,359 people, 4,540 households, and 3,135 families living in the city. The population density was 1,203.7 inhabitants per square mile (464.8/km^{2}). There were 5,111 housing units at an average density of 497.7 inhabitants per square mile (192.2/km^{2}). The racial makeup of the city was 89.8% White, 0.3% African American, 1.0% Native American, 0.3% Asian, 0.2% Pacific Islander, 5.9% from other races, and 2.5% from two or more races. Hispanic or Latino people of any race were 12.3% of the population.

There were 4,540 households, of which 39.9% had children under the age of 18 living with them, 51.8% were married couples living together, 12.0% had a female householder with no husband present, 5.2% had a male householder with no wife present, and 30.9% were non-families. 25.5% of all households were made up of individuals, and 7% had someone living alone who was 65 years of age or older. The average household size was 2.67 and the average family size was 3.21.

The median age in the city was 32.7 years. 30% of residents were under the age of 18; 8.5% were between the ages of 18 and 24; 27.3% were from 25 to 44; 25.7% were from 45 to 64; and 8.6% were 65 years of age or older. The gender makeup of the city was 50.0% male and 50.0% female.

== Arts and culture ==
Evanston hosts a Professional Rodeo Cowboys Association rodeo annually during the Cowboy Days event at the Uinta County Fairgrounds.

=== National Register of Historic Places ===
Nine locations in or near Evanston are listed on the National Register of Historic Places, including:

- Bridger Antelope Trap
- Downtown Evanston Historic District
- A.V. Quinn House
- St. Paul's Episcopal Church
- Uinta County Courthouse
- Union Pacific Railroad Complex
- US Post Office – Evanston Main
- Wyoming State Insane Asylum
- Brigham Young Oil Well

=== Tourism ===
The Uinta County Museum is located on Depot Square in downtown Evanston. Originally built as a Carnegie library in 1906, the building is an example of Classical Revival architecture.

A replica of a Chinese Joss house is located on Depot Square. The Joss House contains a scale model of Evanston's original Chinatown, as well as other artifacts from the 19th and 20th centuries. Near the Joss House is the Wing Family Gazebo and Garden. Former Evanston resident and structural engineer Wayman Wing built a Chinese pavilion, and the City of Evanston constructed a garden with a pond and walking path next to the pavilion.

The Bear River State Park is located adjacent to Interstate 80 on the eastern outskirts of Evanston. The park offers wildlife viewing, a visitors center, picnic grounds, and hiking trails. A trail along the river connects to the Bear River Greenway in Evanston.

== Sports and recreation ==
The City of Evanston Parks and Recreation department operates about 20 facilities. Bear River Greenway is located near downtown, and offers a river walk that extends to Bear River State Park, ice skating in the winter, fishing in the summer, boat rentals, and a fitness trail. Sulphur Creek Reservoir offers boating and fishing. Smaller parks throughout the city contain basketball courts, soccer fields, horseshoe rings, tennis courts, sand volleyball, and playgrounds. The city Recreation Center has a swimming pool and an indoor shooting range. It also provides classes and programming in such sports as martial arts, gymnastics, football, and soccer.

== Government and infrastructure ==
The Wyoming Department of Health Wyoming State Hospital, a psychiatric facility, is located in Evanston. The facility was operated by the Wyoming Board of Charities and Reform until that agency was dissolved as a result of a state constitutional amendment passed in November 1990.

The United States Postal Service operates the Evanston Post Office. The Evanston Regional Hospital has been located in the community since 1950.

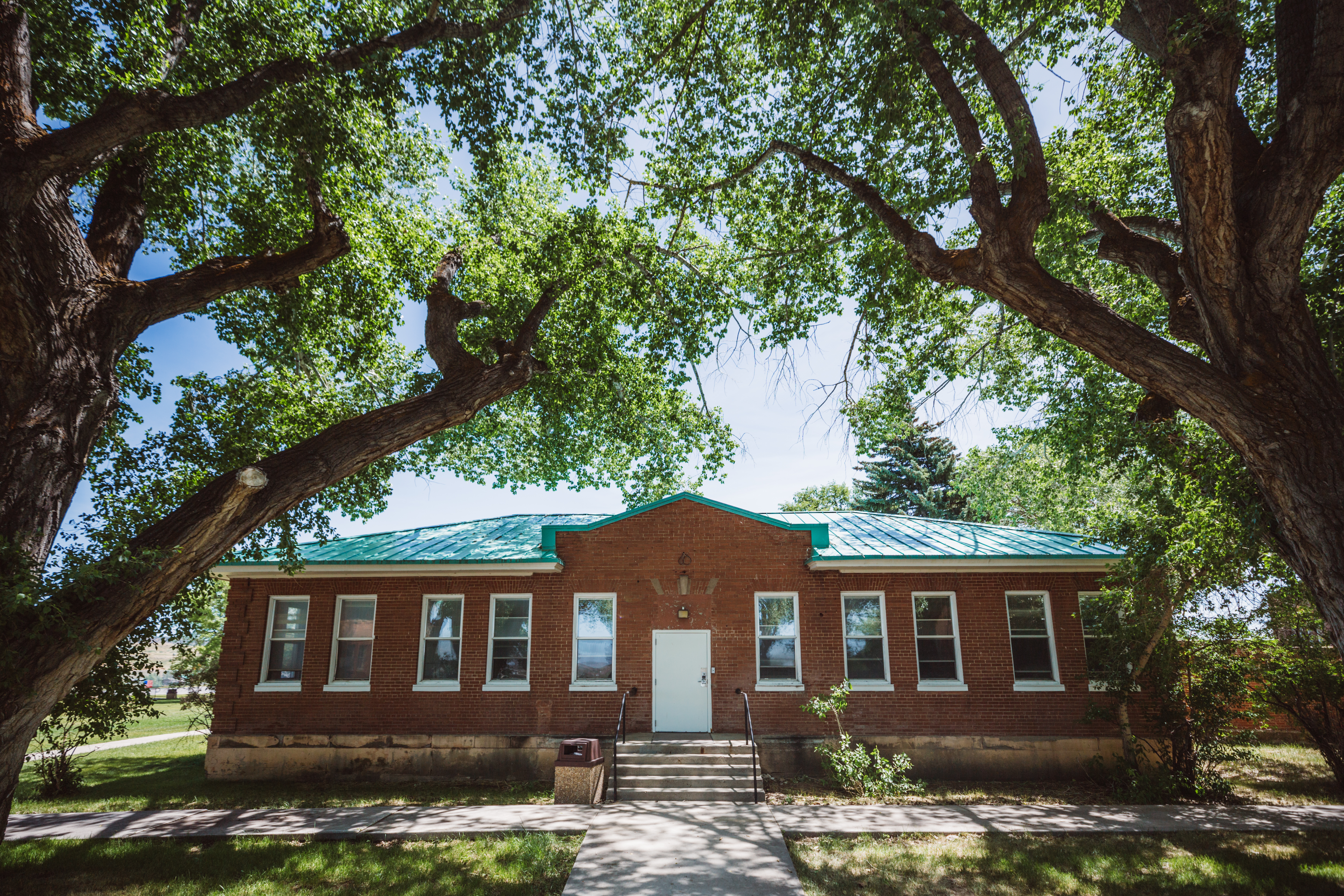
Wyoming State Hospital

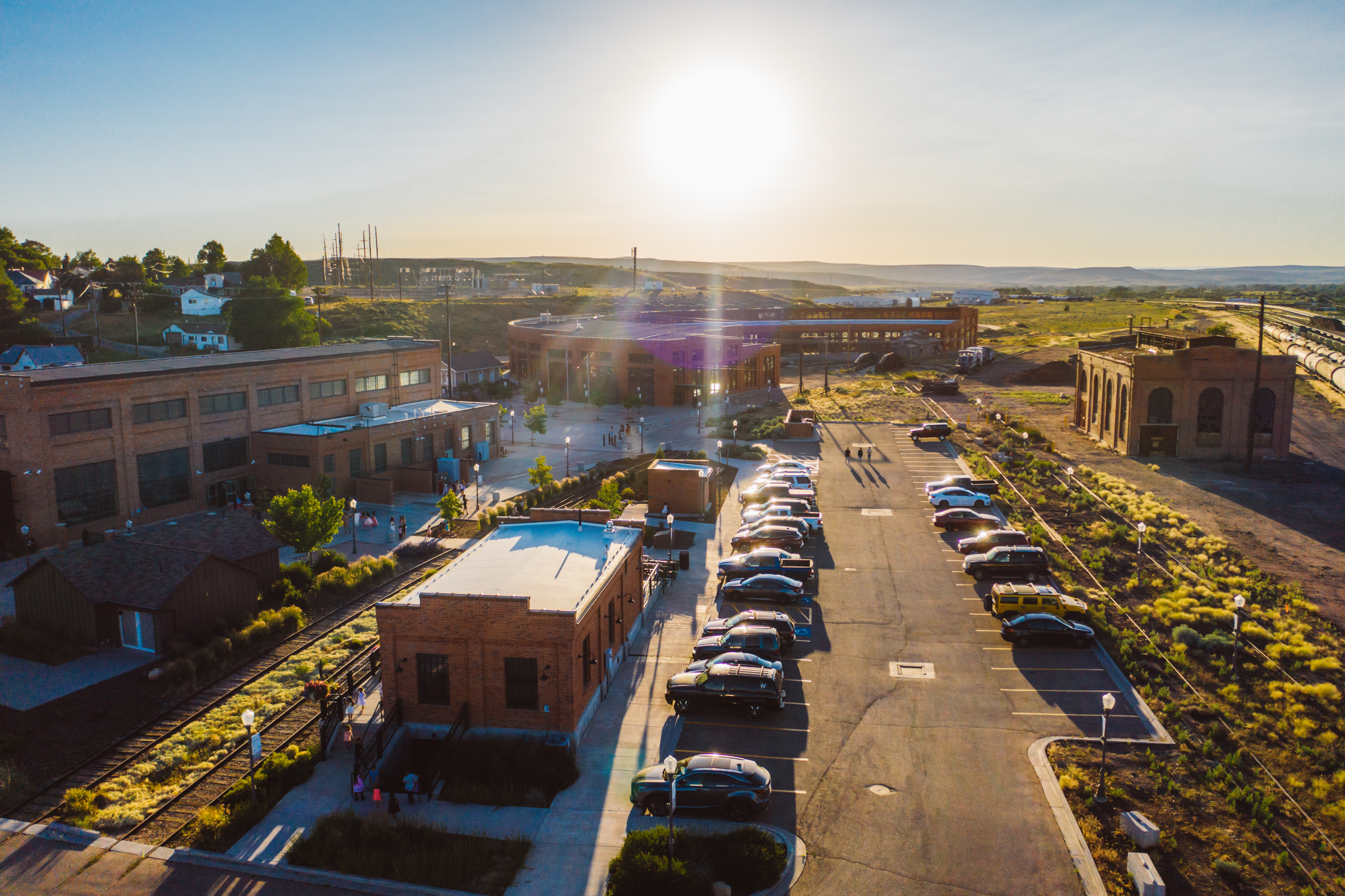
Evanston Roundhouse and Railyards Complex

== Education ==
Public education in the city of Evanston is provided by Uinta County School District #1. The district operates a total of eight campuses, including four elementary schools (Aspen, Clark, North, and Uinta Meadows) serving grades kindergarten through five, two middle schools (Davis and Evanston) serving grades six through eight, one high school (Evanston) serving grades nine through twelve, and one secondary alternative school (Horizon). There is also a BOCES community college there as a branch of the Western Wyoming College in the city.

Evanston has a public library, a branch of the Uinta County Library System.

== Notable people ==
- Curtis Ashton, electrical engineer
- Albert E. Bradbury (1917–2011), politician
- Jaycee Carroll (born 1983), basketball player
- Clarence D. Clark (1851–1930), United States Representative and United States Senator from Wyoming
- Harry L. Harris (1927–2013), politician
- Mark Hopkinson (1949–1992), convicted murderer executed in 1992; born in Evanston
- Dana Perino (born 1972), White House Press Secretary, 2007–2009; born in Evanston
- Brady Poppinga (born 1979), former NFL linebacker
- Kelly Poppinga (born 1982), defensive end coach at Brigham Young University
- David Taylor (born 1990), American freestyle and folkstyle wrestler, won gold medal at 2020 Summer Olympics
- Winston Watts (born 1967), Jamaican bobsledder, resident of Evanston, four-time Olympian
