= Frances McConnell-Mills =

American physician, toxicologist and forensic pathologist (1900-1975)

- Born: Frances Mary McConnell; July 9, 1900; Monument, Colorado
- Died: December 28, 1975 (aged 75); Denver, Colorado
- Other name: Frances McConnell
- Education: University of Denver; University of Colorado Denver
- Medical career
- Profession: Physician
- Field: Toxicology
- Institutions: Denver General Hospital; St. Luke's Hospital
- Sub-specialties: Forensic pathology
- Research: Passive immunity

Frances Mary McConnell-Mills (July 9, 1900 – December 28, 1975) was an American toxicologist. She was the first woman to be appointed Denver's city toxicologist, the first female toxicologist in the Rocky Mountains, and probably the first female forensic pathologist in the United States.

McConnell was raised in Colorado and after studying chemistry she became a high school teacher. She later attended medical school at the University of Colorado Denver, graduating in 1925. She specialized in the fields of toxicology and forensic pathology, which led her to testify in many high-profile criminal cases throughout her career. In addition to working as Denver's city toxicologist, she held positions in multiple hospitals and administrative boards. After battling lifelong health problems, including rheumatic heart disease and a leg amputation, McConnell died in 1975. She was posthumously inducted into the Colorado Women's Hall of Fame.

== Early life ==
McConnell-Mills was born Frances Mary McConnell in 1900 in Monument, Colorado. Her father was a physician and a pharmacist, and often took Frances with him when he made house calls to patients. She was sent to live with her aunt and grandfather so that she could attend Colorado Springs High School; she graduated at the age of 15 and was awarded a full scholarship to the University of Denver. She received a bachelor's degree from the university in 1918, aged 17, and graduated again with a master's degree in chemistry when she was 19, making her the university's youngest graduate with a master's degree at the time. In 1919, she began work as a teacher of chemistry, biology, geometry and trigonometry at Englewood High School.

McConnell applied to the University of Colorado School of Medicine in 1920 and was accepted. Although her father had previously paid for 17 men to attend medical school, he refused to pay for Frances' tuition because he deemed medicine to be "too hard a life for a woman". She therefore supported herself through medical school by working as a musician in local bars and theaters, as a tutor, and as a laboratory assistant. In November 1925, she married David L. Mills, a lawyer, and gave birth to a daughter the year after. Although McConnell hyphenated her name to McConnell-Mills, she continued to use her maiden name for her professional career to avoid drawing attention to her children.

== Career ==
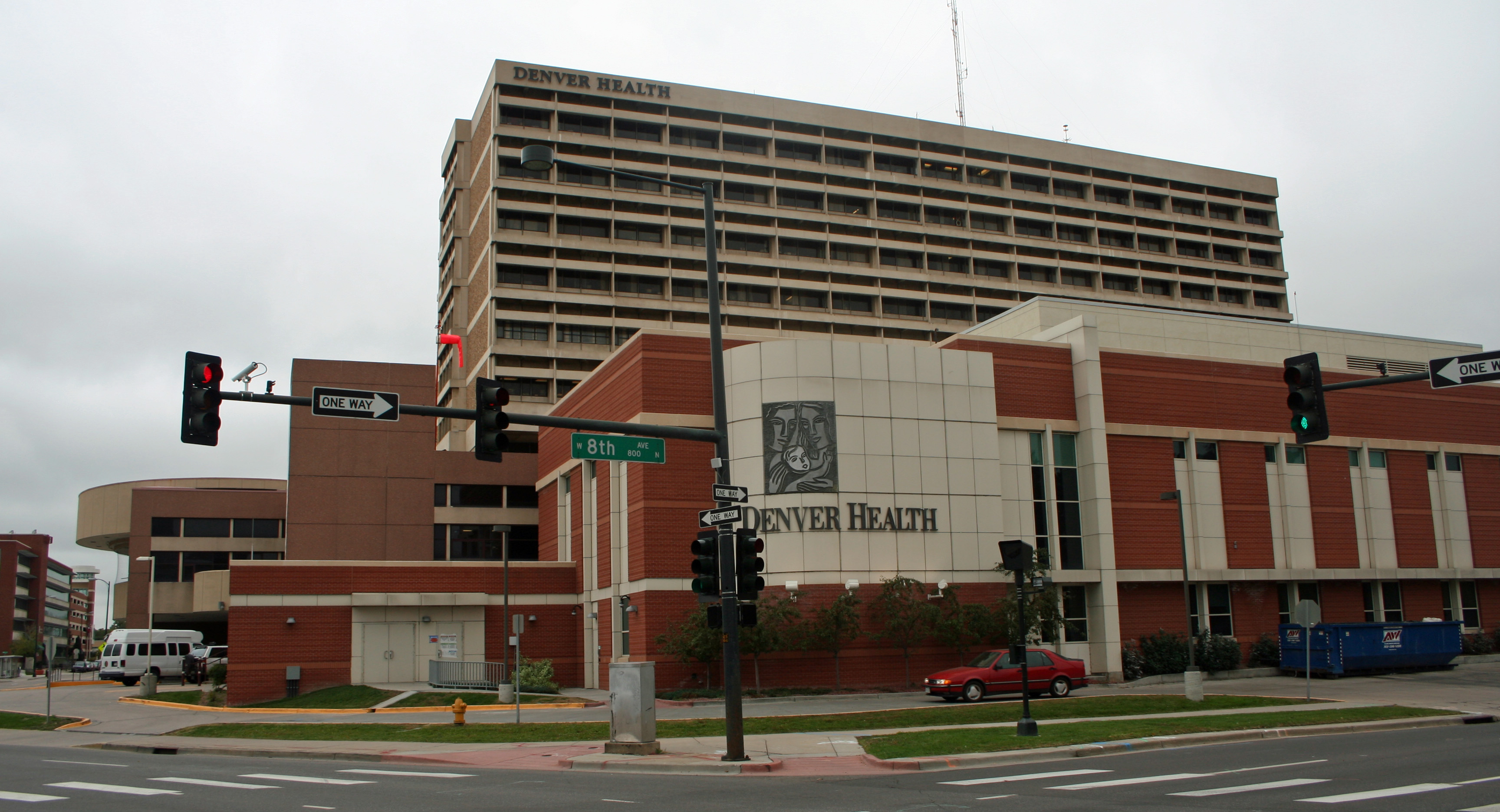
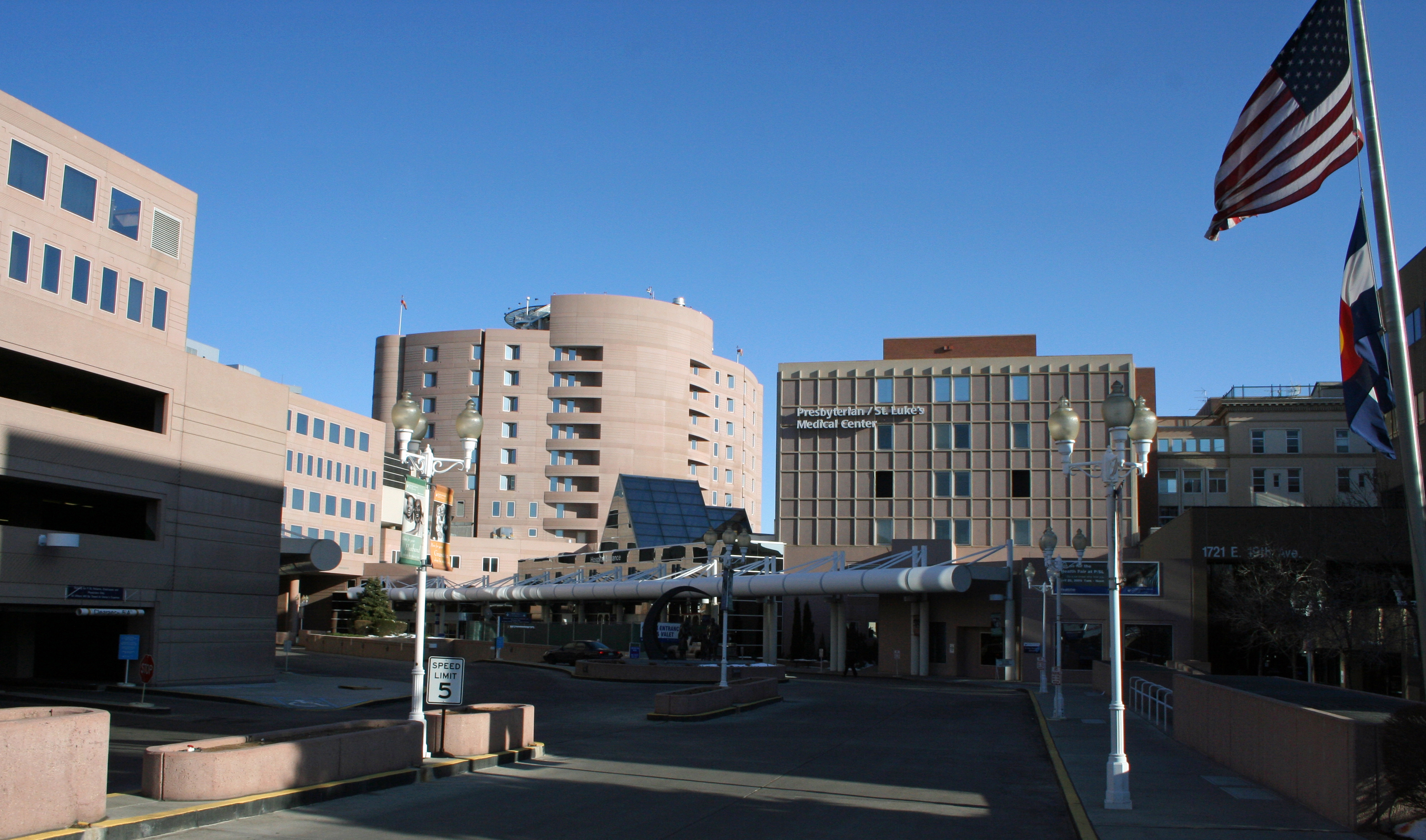
Denver Health Medical Center (formerly Denver General Hospital; top) and Presbyterian/St. Luke's Medical Center (formerly St. Luke's Hospital; bottom), where McConnell worked for parts of her career

McConnell graduated from the University of Colorado as a Doctor of Medicine in 1925 and completed an internship at Denver General Hospital. She subsequently took on a position as a toxicologist in the coroner's offices at the same hospital, making her the first female toxicologist in the Rocky Mountains area. She was appointed Denver's city toxicologist in 1926 and became an assistant pathologist in 1927, working alongside deputy coroner George Bostwick and city pathologist W. S. Dennis. Her appointment to city toxicologist made her the first woman to hold the position.

McConnell's work mainly focused on poison and blood analysis, and she testified in many criminal cases as an expert witness. Her work often involved determining the cause of death when poisoning was suspected. In 1930, she investigated the death of a ten-year-old Denver girl; the case was referred to at the time as the city's "most famous and controversial murder case". Although she initially suspected the girl had been poisoned, McConnell discovered crushed glass in the girl's stomach and blood stains in the family car; her testimony led to the sentencing of the girl's stepmother for murder. In 1936, McConnell testified against suspected rapist and murderer Joe Arridy after finding fibers from the bedspread at the murder scene under the suspect's fingernails. (Although Arridy was convicted of murder and executed in 1939, he was granted a posthumous pardon in 2011.) McConnell also discovered that murder victim Georg Obendoerfer had been killed with a lethal dose of arsenic, which led to further investigations confirming that Anna Marie Hahn had killed Obendoerfer, as well as other men in the same way. McConnell testified at Hahn's trial in Cincinnati and Hahn was subsequently convicted and executed. After she was called to Raton, New Mexico as a key witness in a murder trial in 1935, a court reporter for the Raton Range wrote that McConnell "has gained a national reputation ... in her blood analysis work". Additionally, she is thought to be the United States' first female forensic pathologist. Despite working on numerous high-profile, widely publicized cases, McConnell kept her life as private as possible and only ever gave one interview during her career.

Outside of toxicology, McConnell did extensive laboratory work. In the 1930s and 1940s she undertook personal research into passive immunity and developed serums for scarlet fever, polio, the common cold and acne for use on family members. While working for otolaryngologist Harry Baum, she invented a hair rinse which Baum called "Noreen" that was produced until the 1990s. In 1941, she was appointed director of the laboratory department of the Colorado State Board of Health, and she later founded Denver General Hospital's School for Medical Technologists in order to train new workers, especially women. She enrolled in an advanced serology training program at the University of Michigan in 1941 and went on to study surgical pathology at the Cook County Hospital in Chicago in 1943. Following her term at Cook County, she resigned from the Board of Health and accepted a role at St. Luke's Hospital in Denver as a laboratory director and pathologist. She was forced to leave St. Luke's in 1944 due to illness, and after recovering she returned to Denver General Hospital as its laboratory director. She continued to work on criminal cases between other jobs until 1948.

In the 1950s, McConnell joined physician and public health activist Florence R. Sabin to create an examination on behalf of the Colorado State Board of Basic Sciences for granting licenses to applicants who wished to practice health science. McConnell was appointed to the Board in 1956, making her the only female member at the time, and served until 1975.

== Health problems and death ==
McConnell battled with health problems throughout her life, after contracting rheumatic fever at the age of 20 which subsequently progressed to rheumatic heart disease. In 1944 she contracted appendicitis which required an emergency appendectomy; she developed deep vein thrombosis in her right leg after the surgery and her leg was subsequently amputated above the knee. She was given a prosthetic leg which she named "Matilda" but later needed to use a wheelchair.

Following the death of her husband in 1967, McConnell lived alone. She kept working until the last two weeks of her life, filling various roles on the Board of Basic Sciences, in an allergy practice, and as a consultant for the Denver Poison Center. She died in December 1975 in St. Luke's Hospital, Denver, at the age of 75.

== Legacy ==
A year before her death, in December 1974, McConnell received an award from the University of Colorado Medical School which recognized her as a 50-year graduate of the school and as one of only two Coloradoan women at the time who had practiced medicine for 50 years.

She was inducted into the Colorado Women's Hall of Fame in 1996. In 1999, her daughter Jeanne Varnell published a book titled Women of Consequence: The Colorado Women's Hall of Fame, which contains the biographies of McConnell and 58 other inductees of the Hall of Fame. The project began when Varnell set out to write a biography of her mother, but was urged by her editor to do the same for all 59 of the women in the Hall of Fame at the time, and compile them into a book.
