= Mango House (United States) =

Refugee and immigrant services center

- Formation: 2011; 15 years ago
- Founder: P.J. Parmar
- Headquarters: Aurora, Colorado, U.S.
- Region served: Colorado
- Website: www.ardasclinic.com/mangohouse.html

Mango House is a community space located in Aurora, Colorado, that hosts the Ardas Family Medicine clinic, providing medical care to refugee and immigrant communities. Mango House also holds a dental clinic, pharmacy, international food stalls, ethnic clothing shops, an international grocery store, as well as spaces for religious and community organizations. In addition to its spaces, Mango House provides food and clothing assistance, after school programs, English classes, and legal assistance.

== Background ==
Mango House is owned by Dr. P.J. Parmar, who runs the for-profit Ardas Family Medicine clinic inside the facility. Years before the establishment of Mango House, in 2004, Parmer left his job as an environmental engineer to attend the University of Colorado School of Medicine. He would graduate from the school in 2008, having completed his residency at St. Anthony North Family Medicine in Westminster, Colorado. Following this, Parmer opened a small clinic to provide care for refugee and immigrant populations in east Denver and Aurora. After the clinic's lease expired in 2014, it moved within Denver before landing at the site of a former JCPenney store in Aurora. In 2019, Mango House began to host international food stalls.

== Activities ==
Mango House sees refugees from "Nepal, Burma, Ethiopia and Somalia, among other nations." A majority of the center's income comes from patients' Medicaid insurance. The center sees some patients pro bono if they do not qualify. Medical, dental, and pharmaceutical services are hosted in the space.

In the food court, restaurant stalls are rented to individuals who represent the food from their countries, which has previously included individuals from Sudan, Syria, Haiti, Ethiopia, Burma, Nepal, Somalia, and other North African foods.

In January 2017, Mango House received an anonymous bomb threat. Parmar disregarded the threat, but spoke to the sentiment felt by supporters of the rhetoric of President Donald Trump, which emboldened the person who left the threat. Residents of Aurora have protested rallies held by Donald Trump in the area by supporting businesses within Mango House during his appearances.
