= Susan Heitler =

American psychologist

- Born: 1945 (age 80–81)
- Education: Harvard University; Boston University; New York University
- Spouse: Bruce Heitler
- Scientific career
- Fields: Clinical psychology

Susan Heitler is an American clinical psychologist. She practiced from 1975 to 2020 at the Rose Medical Center in Denver, treating individuals, couples and families. She specializes in treating depression, anger, anxiety, marital problems, parental alienation, and conflict resolution.

== Biography ==
Susan Heitler was born in 1945. She graduated from Harvard University in 1967, with a B.A. degree in English. She received her MEd. from Boston University in 1968, specializing in the education of emotionally disturbed children. Heitler was awarded a PhD in clinical psychology from New York University in 1975.

== Career ==
In her clinical work, Heitler specializes in the treatment of couples and in giving workshops to train individual therapy practitioners in techniques of couples' therapy. Heitler's writings have contributed an integrative therapy map for eclectic therapists (therapists who use techniques from multiple schools of treatment). In addition, her writing has focused on increasing understanding of the process of conflict resolution.

She has been invited to give lectures throughout the USA and all over the world, including India, China, Israel, Spain, Australia, the UAE, Lebanon, and Turkey. One of the works of hers is "From Conflict to Resolution", published in 1993. It was reviewed by the Colorado Psychological Association Bulletin in May 2006. According to the author of the review, "Heitler wrote "From Conflict to Resolution" to bring understandings of collaborative solution building from the fields of mediation, law and business to the realms of mental health and psychotherapy." In 1997 she authored “The Power of Two”, along with its companion "Power of Two Workbook". The work is positioned as a source of help for couples to deal with marital issues.

In 2007, she presented Shane Marie Morrow lecture titled “Pleasure to Kill You” at the Metropolitan State University of Denver’s Department of Psychology. Heitler spoke about the parallels between domestic abusers and terrorists.

She gave a TEDx Talk in Wilmington Delaware in 2016, "Lift Depression With These 3 Prescriptions- Without-Pills" The presentation centered around her newly published book “Prescriptions Without Pills”. The book offers readers practical tools for addressing emotional challenges without medication, emphasizing how everyday experiences impact mental health. Dr. Heitler combines insights into anger, anxiety, and depression with exercises, critiquing the overuse of psychotropic drugs and promoting therapeutic interventions.

In 2011, Heitler started writing a blog titled “Resolution, Not Conflict” for Psychology Today website.

In 2013, she was chosen as a fellow of the American Psychological Association for her work as a psychologist in independent practice.

In 2016, she delivered the keynote address at the inaugural meeting of the Pan-Arab Psychological Association in Beirut, presenting a talk titled "Conflict Resolution: My Way, No MY Way."

== Books ==
- Heitler, Susan M. (1985). David Decides About Thumbsucking: A Guide for Parents. Reading Matters. p. 64. ISBN 978-0961478025.
- Heitler, Susan M. (1992), Working with couples in conflict., New York, NY: W.W. Norton, ISBN 0-393-70151-4, OCLC 26710488 (Audio Cassette)
- Heitler, Susan M. (1993). From conflict to resolution : skills and strategies for individual, couple, and family therapy. New York: Norton. ISBN 0-393-31093-0. OCLC 30157162.
- Heitler, Susan M. (1993). David decides : no more thumb-sucking. Paula Singer. New York: Avon Books. ISBN 0-380-76852-6. OCLC 27870104.
- Heitler, Susan M. (1995). Conflict Resolution for Couples (Audio Cassette). ISBN 1884998054.
- Heitler, Susan M. (1997). The power of two : secrets to a strong & loving marriage. Paula Singer. Oakland, Calif.: New Harbinger Publications. ISBN 1-57224-059-8. OCLC 37104532.
- Heitler, Susan M. (2003). The power of two workbook : communication skills for a strong & loving marriage. Abigail Hirsch. Oakland, CA: New Harbinger Publications. ISBN 1-57224-334-1. OCLC 53384701.
- Heitler, Susan M. (2004), Depression: a disorder of power, [Denver, Colo.], ISBN 978-1-884998-21-8, OCLC 1080314102 (Audio CD)
- Heitler, Susan M. (2016). Prescriptions without pills : for relief from depression, anger, anxiety, and more. New York. ISBN 978-1-63047-810-0. OCLC 954238212.
