= DFD =

DFD may refer to:

- Dancing Ferret Discs, a record label
- Dartford railway station, Kent, England (National Rail code)
- Data-flow diagram
- Demokratischer Frauenbund Deutschlands DDR (Democratic Women's League of Germany in the GDR)
- Dallas Fire Department
- Denver Fire Department
- Detroit Financial District
- Detroit Fire Department
- Digitales Familiennamenwörterbuch Deutschlands, or Digital Dictionary of Family Names in Germany, maintained by the Academy of Sciences and Literature, Germany
- Direct Fusion Drive, a conceptual nuclear-fusion rocket engine
- Dietrich Fischer-Dieskau, a German baritone known primarily for his vast recordings of Lieder
- Document Freedom Day, promoting Open Standards
- Dog Fashion Disco, an American metal band
- DFD, 2011 album by Dumbfoundead
- Dyfed, preserved county in Wales, Chapman code
- Köppen climate classification#Dfd, subarctic or boreal climates with severe winters
