= Swedish Hospital =

Swedish Hospital is a hospital in Chicago. Swedish Hospital may also refer to:

- Endeavor Swedish Hospital, a hospital in Chicago, Illinois, United States
- Health care in Sweden
- Swedish Health Services, formerly Swedish Medical Center, a healthcare network in the metropolitan Seattle area
- Swedish Medical Center (Colorado), a hospital in Englewood, Colorado, United States

== See also ==
- List of hospitals in Sweden
