= Mountain & Plains ERC =

The Mountain & Plains Education and Research Center is one of eighteen Education and Research Centers funded by the National Institute for Occupational Safety and Health (NIOSH). NIOSH and the NIOSH Education and Research Centers are affiliated with the Centers for Disease Control and Prevention.

The Mountain & Plains Education and Research Center is a collaboration between the University of Colorado Denver (Anschutz Medical Campus), Colorado State University, National Jewish Health, the University of New Mexico and Denver Health.

== Role ==
The Mountain & Plains ERC provides financial support for graduate students and medical residents who focus their studies on issues related to health and safety in the workplace. In particular, the Mountain & Plains ERC supports the following academic programs:

- Industrial Hygiene (Colorado State University)
- Occupational and Environmental Medicine (UC Denver, Denver Health & National Jewish Health)
- Health Physics (Colorado State University)
- Occupational health psychology (Colorado State University)
- Ergonomics (Colorado State University)

In addition to providing financial support for future occupational safety and health professionals, the Mountain & Plains ERC engages in the following activities:

- Outreach to businesses, government agencies, labor unions and community organizations
- Continuing education for occupational health and safety professionals
- Pilot grants for researchers and community organizations
