= Government of Denver =

US state government

The Government of Denver makes up the public sector of the City and County of Denver, Colorado.

== Organization ==
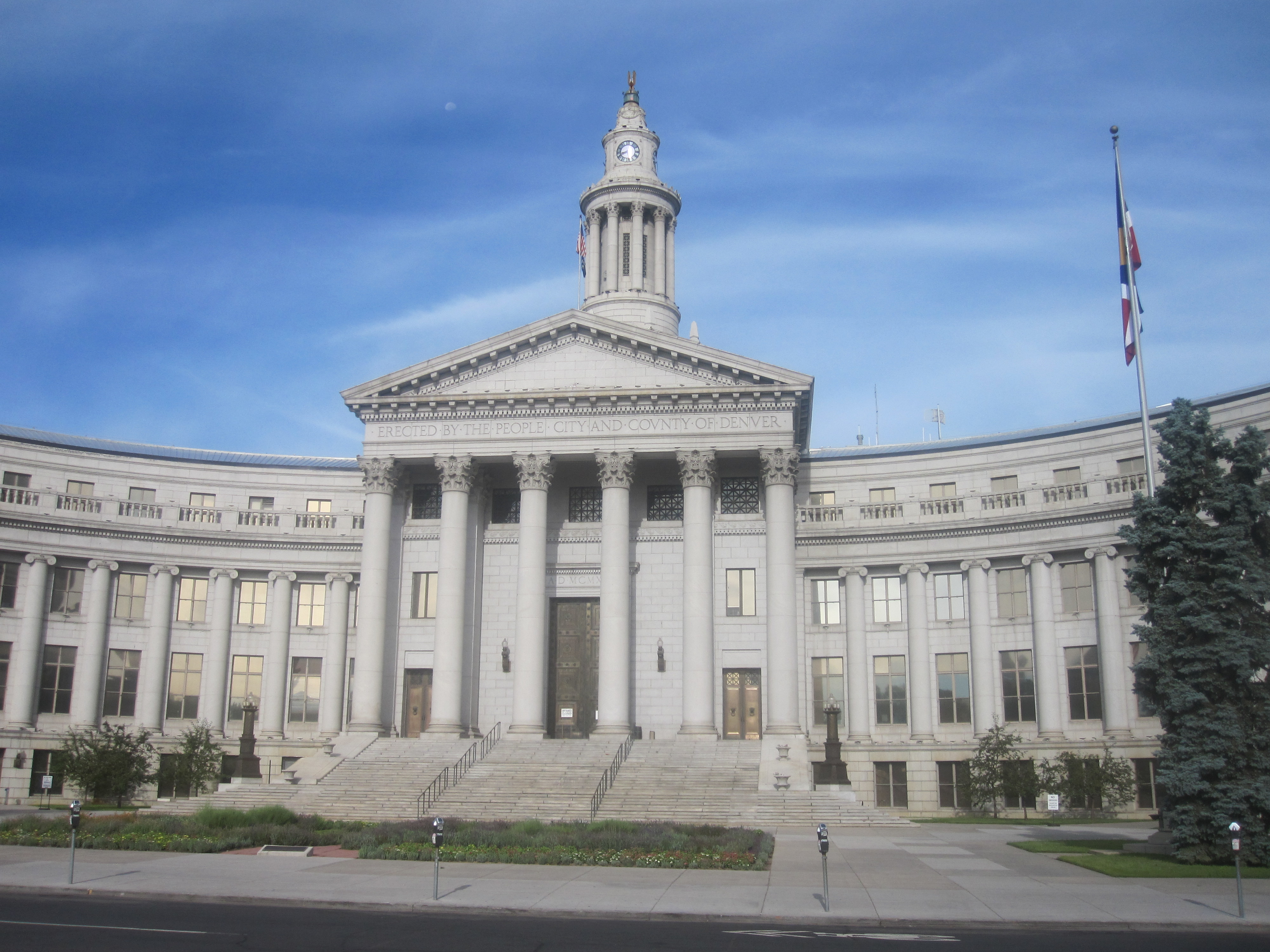
Denver City and County Building

Denver is a consolidated city-county with an elected mayor, thirteen-member city council, auditor, and clerk and recorder. Denver city elections are on a non-partisan basis: that is, there are no official party nominees, though officials may belong to a political party. All citywide elected officials have four-year terms, with a maximum of three terms.

=== Mayor ===
Denver has a strong mayor and a weak city council government. The mayor can approve or veto any ordinances or resolutions approved by the council, make sure all contracts with the city are kept and performed, sign all bonds and contracts, is responsible for the city budget, and can appoint people to various city departments, organizations, and commissions. The current mayor is Mike Johnston.

=== City Council ===
The thirteen-member Denver City Council is responsible for passing and changing all laws, resolutions, and ordinances, usually after a public hearing. Eleven members are elected from constituent districts and two from at-large districts. The council can override the Mayor's veto with a nine out of thirteen member vote, and the city budget must be approved and can be changed by a simple majority vote of the council. They can also call for misconduct investigations of Denver's departmental officials.

=== District Attorney ===
The Denver District Attorney is responsible for the prosecution of state criminal violations in the Second Judicial District, composed entirely of Denver. A district attorney is elected for each of the state's 22 judicial districts in a partisan election.

=== Auditor ===
The Auditor checks all expenditures and may refuse to allow specific ones, usually based on financial reasons.

=== Clerk and Recorder ===
The Clerk and Recorder functions as the city and county clerk, county recorder, and county public trustee, and manages elections and voter registration including campaign finance requirements. As clerk they are responsible for publication of the charter and municipal code, City Council minutes, agendas, ordinances, and resolutions, the Mayor's executive orders, and compiling rules and regulations enacted by Denver agencies. As public trustee they are responsible for foreclosure and deed release filings, including weekly foreclosure property auctions. As county recorder they are responsible for recording deeds, deeds of trust, quit claim deeds, liens, marriage licenses, and civil union licenses (the Domestic Partnership Registry), and acts as the repository for boundary maps of certain special districts.

=== Department of Safety ===
The Denver Department of Safety oversees three branches: Denver Police Department, Denver Fire Department, and the Denver Sheriff Department. The current director of public safety is Armando Saldate, who joined the city in 2014 with the Denver Sheriff's Department.

==== Police Department ====
As of 2009, the Denver Police Department had 1500 police officers. The department is headed by Police Chief Ron Thomas, who has served as acting chief of the city's police department since August 2022.

The Police Department began in December 1859, with the election of the first city marshal. The force gained its first African-American police officer in 1880, and its first female police "matron" in 1888.

==== Fire Department ====
The city of Denver is protected 24/7, 365 by the paid, full-time firefighters of the city of Denver Fire Department (DFD). The Denver Fire Department currently is organized into 6 Divisions of Operations, each under the Command of a Division Chief: Operations Division; Fire Prevention and Investigation Division; Technical Services Division; Administrative Division; Safety and Training Division; Airport Division.

The DFD currently operates out of 34 Fire Stations (including 4 Airport Stations) in 8 Districts, each under the command of an Assistant Chief, located throughout the city. The Denver Fire Department operates a fire apparatus fleet of 28 Engines, 14 Trucks, 1 Heavy Rescue, 1 Hammer Team (Technical Rescue) Unit, 1 Haz-Mat. Unit, 1 Collapse Unit, 1 Water Rescue Unit, and numerous special, support, and reserve units. The current Chief of Department is Eric Tade.

=== Department of Transportation & Infrastructure ===
The Denver Department of Transportation & Infrastructure (DOTI), formerly the Department of Public Works (DPW), manages road maintenance and repair, parking enforcement, trash collection services, and design and construction management of streets, bridges, and public buildings.

=== Department of Aviation ===
The Department of Aviation manages the Denver International Airport.

=== County Court ===
The Denver County Court is an integrated Colorado County Court and Municipal Court and is not part of the state court system for administrative purposes. Uniquely, the Denver Probate Court and the Denver Juvenile Court have jurisdiction over probate and juvenile matters respectively. Outside Denver, these matters are within the jurisdiction of the Colorado District Courts. The Denver County Court Judicial Nomination Commission recommends candidates to the Mayor of Denver to fill vacancies on the Denver County Court.

Denver courts are located both in the City and County Building, and in the Lindsey-Flanigan Courthouse.

=== Denver Water ===
Denver Water is the public utility that provides water to Denver. It is supervised by the five-member Board of Water Commissioners, whose members are appointed by the mayor of Denver to six-year terms. The Board in turn designates a manager who is in charge of day-to-day operations.

=== Assessor ===
The County Assessor is responsible for valuing all property in the county except for exempt property and state assessed properties. Taxpayers may appeal the assigned value to the Assessor and the County Board of Equalization (valuation appeal and abatement).

=== Board of Equalization ===
The Denver Board of Equalization performs the functions of equalization, reduction, abatement, and rebate of general taxes. Of the functions, abatement is usually the responsibility of the Board of County Commissioners. It is composed of the Manager of General Services, Manager of Public Works, Clerk and Recorder, Chief Financial Officer, and President of the City Council. The Colorado Board of Assessment Appeals (BAA) hears appeals filed by real and personal property owners regarding the valuation placed on their property.

=== Housing Authority ===
In 1935-1937 the state authorized local housing authorities. The Denver Housing Authority was created by the Council in 1938 and its first commissioners were appointed by the Mayor on 2 September 1938.

== Law ==
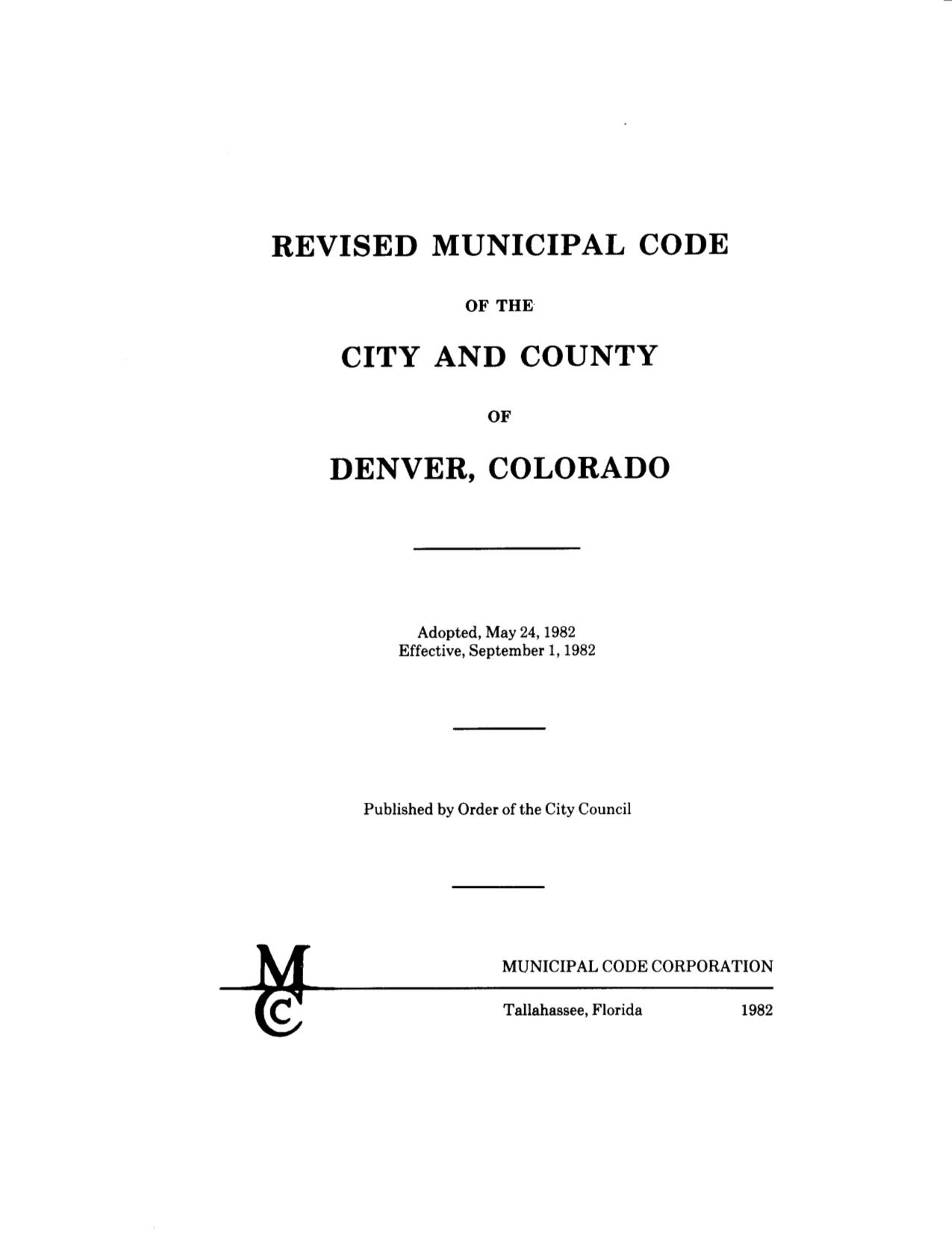
Title page of the Denver Revised Municipal Code (DRMC)

Pursuant to the Constitution and law of Colorado, Denver is governed by the Charter of Denver. Pursuant to its charter, the council has promulgated numerous local ordinances which have been codified in the Denver Revised Municipal Code (DRMC).

The City and County of Denver levies an Occupational Privilege Tax (OPT or Head Tax) on employers and employees.

- If any employee performs work in the city limits and is paid over $500 for that work in a single month, the employee and employer are both liable for the OPT regardless of where the main business office is located or headquartered.
- The employer is liable for $4 per employee per month and the employee is liable for $5.75 per month.
- It is the employer's responsibility to withhold, remit, and file the OPT returns. If an employer does not comply, the employer can be held liable for both portions of the OPT as well as penalties and interest.

== Politics ==
While Denver elections are non-partisan, Democrats have long held a virtual monopoly on Denver politics with all citywide elected officials having Democratic Party affiliation. The office of Denver's Mayor has been occupied by a Democrat since the municipal general election of 1963.

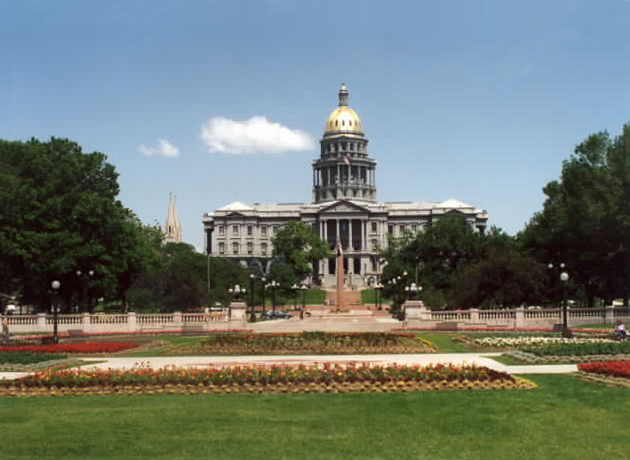
The capitol building, Colorado's political center, located in Denver.

Former Denver mayor John Hickenlooper was a member of the Mayors Against Illegal Guns Coalition, an organization formed in 2006 and co-chaired by New York City mayor Michael Bloomberg and Boston mayor Thomas Menino.

In federal elections, Denverites also tend to vote for Democratic candidates. Denver is represented at the federal level by congresswoman Diana DeGette, a Democrat representing Colorado's 1st congressional district, which includes all of Denver and parts of Arapahoe County.

== History ==
Denver was founded in 1858 and incorporated in 1861. The city was chosen as the permanent state capital of Colorado by a special election in 1881.

The historic Denver City and County Building was built to house city and county administration before 1920.

In hosting the 1908 Democratic National Convention, Denver gained a spotlight in what was at the time an east coast-dominated national politics. Industrialists now moving west with innovation and big business were witness to Denver's political value, and more importantly, venue. Conquering the west is considered to be no easy challenge politically, and still an important asset. In the later part of the 20th century, winning the west was seen as crucial to a win abroad, making Denver the "center stage" in the political arena.

During the 1960s and 1970s, Denver was one of the epicenters of the Chicano Movement. The boxer-turned-activist Rodolfo "Corky" Gonzales formed an organization called the Crusade for Justice, which battled police brutality, fought for bilingual education, and, most notably, hosted the First National Chicano Youth Liberation Conference in March 1969.

Denver hosted the 2008 Democratic National Convention, which coincided with the centennial of the city's 1908 hosting of the convention. The 2008 Libertarian National Convention was also hosted in Denver, which is also the site of the original Libertarian Party Convention, which was held in 1972. It also hosted the G7 summit between June 20 and June 22, 1997.

On October 31, 2011, it was announced that The University of Denver in Denver was selected as the host of the first of three 2012 presidential debates to be held on October 3, 2012.

== Other governments ==
The Denver Public Schools (DPS) district is the public school system in Denver. DPS is governed by the elected seven-member Denver Board of Education, with five elected by voters within five districts and two elected at-large. The Board in turn appoints the Superintendent.

The Regional Transportation District (RTD) is the regional authority operating public transit services in eight counties that have delegated transit public services to the multi-county district, of a total of the twelve counties in the Denver-Aurora-Boulder Combined Statistical Area. RTD is governed by a 15-member Board of Directors, elected to four-year terms within specific constituency districts.

The Denver Health and Hospital Authority (DHHA), which manages the Denver Health Medical Center and other hospitals and services in the region, is governed by a nine-member Board of Directors who are appointed for five years by the Mayor and confirmed by the City Council.

== List of notable mayors ==
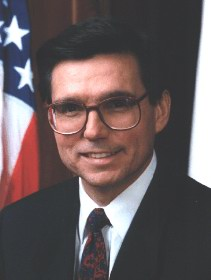
Federico Peña

- Charles A. Cook (Nonpartisan), 1861–63
- John Long Routt (Republican), 1883–85
- Robert W. Speer (Democrat), 1904–12, 1916–18
- Benjamin F. Stapleton (Democrat), 1923–31, 1935–47
- Federico Peña (Democrat), 1983–91
- Wellington Webb (Democrat), 1991–2003
- John Hickenlooper (Democrat), 2003-2011

== See also ==
- Government of Colorado
