= HealthOne =

Healthcare system in Denver, Colorado, U.S.

HCA HealthONE
- Type: Subsidiary
- Industry: Health care
- Founded: 1991; 35 years ago
- Headquarters: Denver, Colorado, United States
- Area served: Colorado
- Parent: HCA Healthcare
- Website: hcahealthone.com

HCA HealthONE is the largest healthcare system in the metro Denver area, with more than 12,000 employees and 4,500 affiliated physicians. HCA HealthOne is a part of HCA Healthcare.

HealthONE was established when P/SL Healthcare (Presbyterian St. Luke's) bought AMI's Colorado assets in 1991. That entity merged with Swedish Hospital to become P/SL Swedish, and the HealthONE name was adopted in late 1993; it was purchased from a health care system in Minnesota, which had used the moniker until merging with another company in 1992. From 1995 to 2011, it was co-owned by HCA and the Colorado Health Foundation; HCA bought the remaining stake for $1.45 billion in 2011.

== Affiliated hospitals and medical centers ==
- The Medical Center of Aurora
- North Suburban Medical Center and North Suburban Northeast ER
- Presbyterian/St. Luke's Medical Center and Rocky Mountain Hospital for Children
- Rose Medical Center
- Sky Ridge Medical Center
- Spalding Rehabilitation Hospital
- Swedish Medical Center and Swedish Southwest ER
- AirLife Denver
- Rocky Mountain Hospital for Children (RMHC)
