= The Medical Center of Aurora =

- HealthONE Colorado
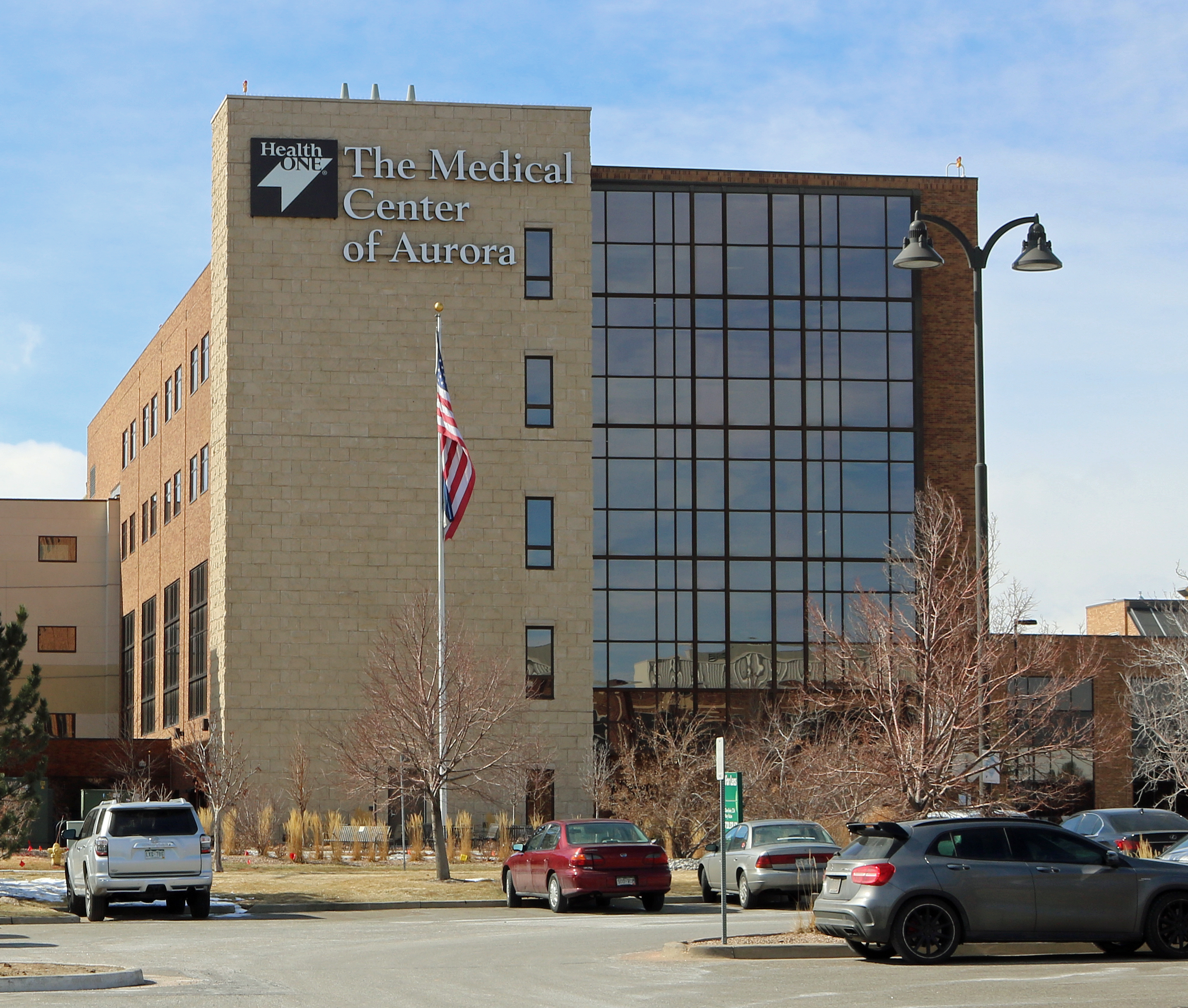
- One of the medical center buildings.

Geography
- Location: 1501 S Potomac Street, Aurora, Colorado, United States
- Coordinates: 39°41′20″N 104°49′55″W

Organization
- Care system: Private
- Type: General, medical and surgical

Services
- Emergency department: Level II trauma center
- Beds: 346

History
- Founded: 1974

Links
- Website: www.auroramed.com
- Lists: Hospitals in Colorado

HCA HealthONE Aurora serves Aurora, Colorado, and the eastern Denver-Aurora Metropolitan Area (metro area) in the United States. It has four separate campuses providing a wide range of health care services. It was founded in 1974; it now employs more than 1,200 people and is part of HCA HealthONE, the largest health care system in the metro area. Currently, there are more than 451 doctors on staff and 347 beds.

== Services ==
Specialties for which HCA HealthONE Aurora is best known locally and nationally include heart and vascular care, surgical services, women's services, cancer services, and neurosciences, including spine, brain and stroke care.

The center is the only hospital in Colorado with a Level 1 Cardiac Center, which includes a Cardiac Alert Program, designed to train and equip first responders to more quickly and accurately detect and treat heart attacks, and serves as a model for other hospitals throughout the U.S. These and other services have gained national respect and honors for outcomes and efficiencies

The center was the first health care organization in Colorado to offer Aquapheresis, a medical therapy that removes large volumes of excess fluid, designed to improve the quality of life for patients with Congestive Heart Failure.

The center also offers robotic surgery using the Da Vinci Surgical System to perform a variety of minimally invasive surgeries.

== Facilities ==
Main Campus, Aurora

Spalding Rehabilitation Hospital, Aurora

HCA HealthONE Centennial, Centennial
