= Denver Health Paramedic Division =

Paramedic service in Colorado, U.S.

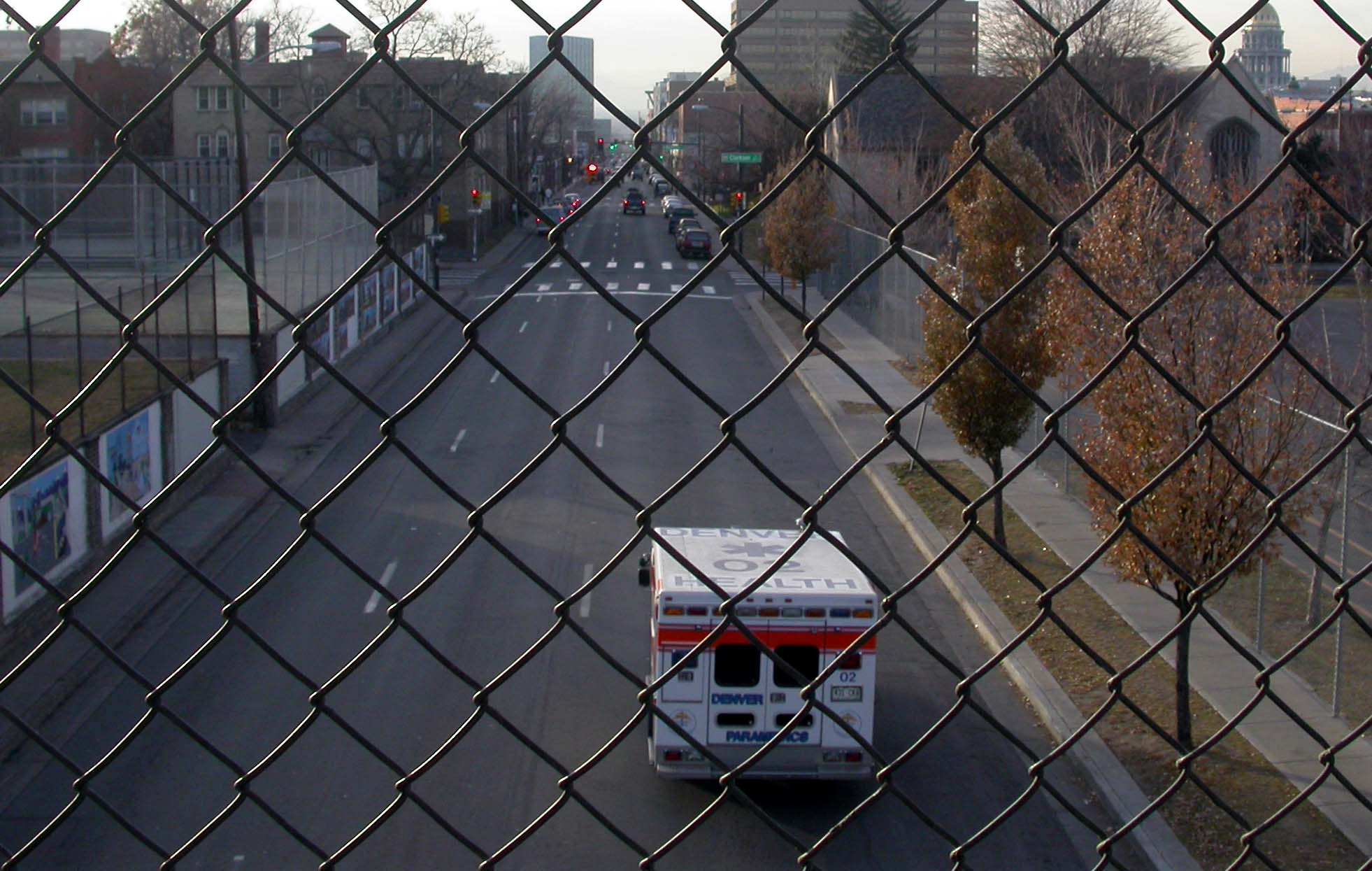
Denver paramedics on E 13th Ave and Ogden St

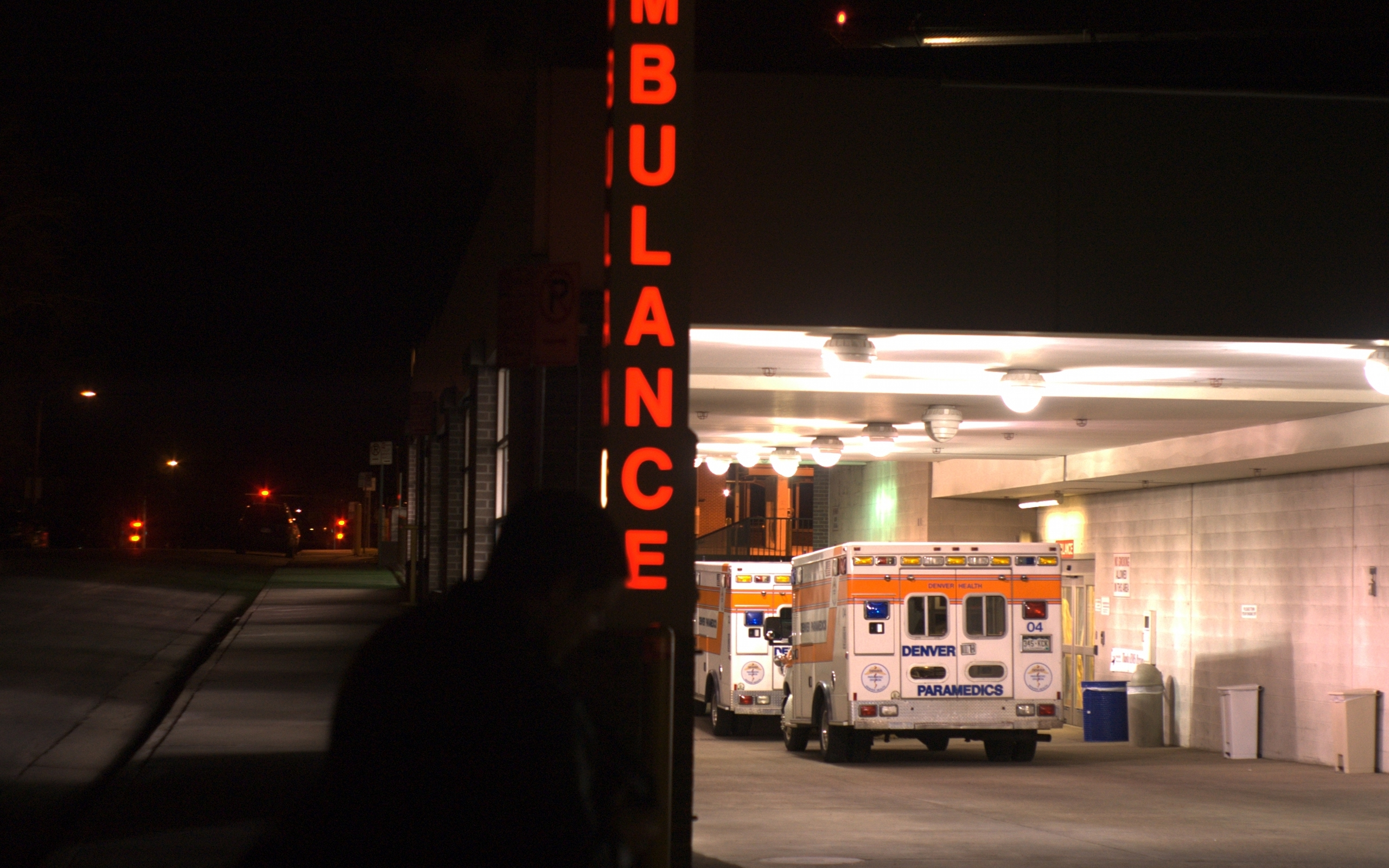
Denver Paramedics at Swedish Medical Center

Denver Health Paramedic Division is a public, hospital-based paramedic service based at Denver Health Medical Center in Denver, Colorado, in the United States.

Denver Health Paramedics are contracted to provide the 911 medical services to The City and County of Denver, The City of Glendale, the City of Sheridan, City of Englewood, the "Skyline" portion of unincorporated Arapahoe County and Denver International Airport.

The Denver Health Paramedic Division has a fleet of at least 36 ambulances (including 34 ALS ambulances and 2 BLS ambulances). At peak times it has 24 advanced life support ambulances available, most staffed by two paramedics.

Denver Paramedics respond to an average of 130,000 calls for service a year, an average of 355 calls a day. More than 90,000 patients are transported to Denver area hospitals a year by Denver Paramedics.

The largest number of emergency calls that Denver Paramedics respond to are auto accidents, seizures, falls, altered mental status calls and other emergencies. Cardiac arrest calls account for one half of one percent of all emergency calls.

== See also ==
- Denver Health Medical Center
