= The Colorado Health Foundation =

U.S. nonprofit organization

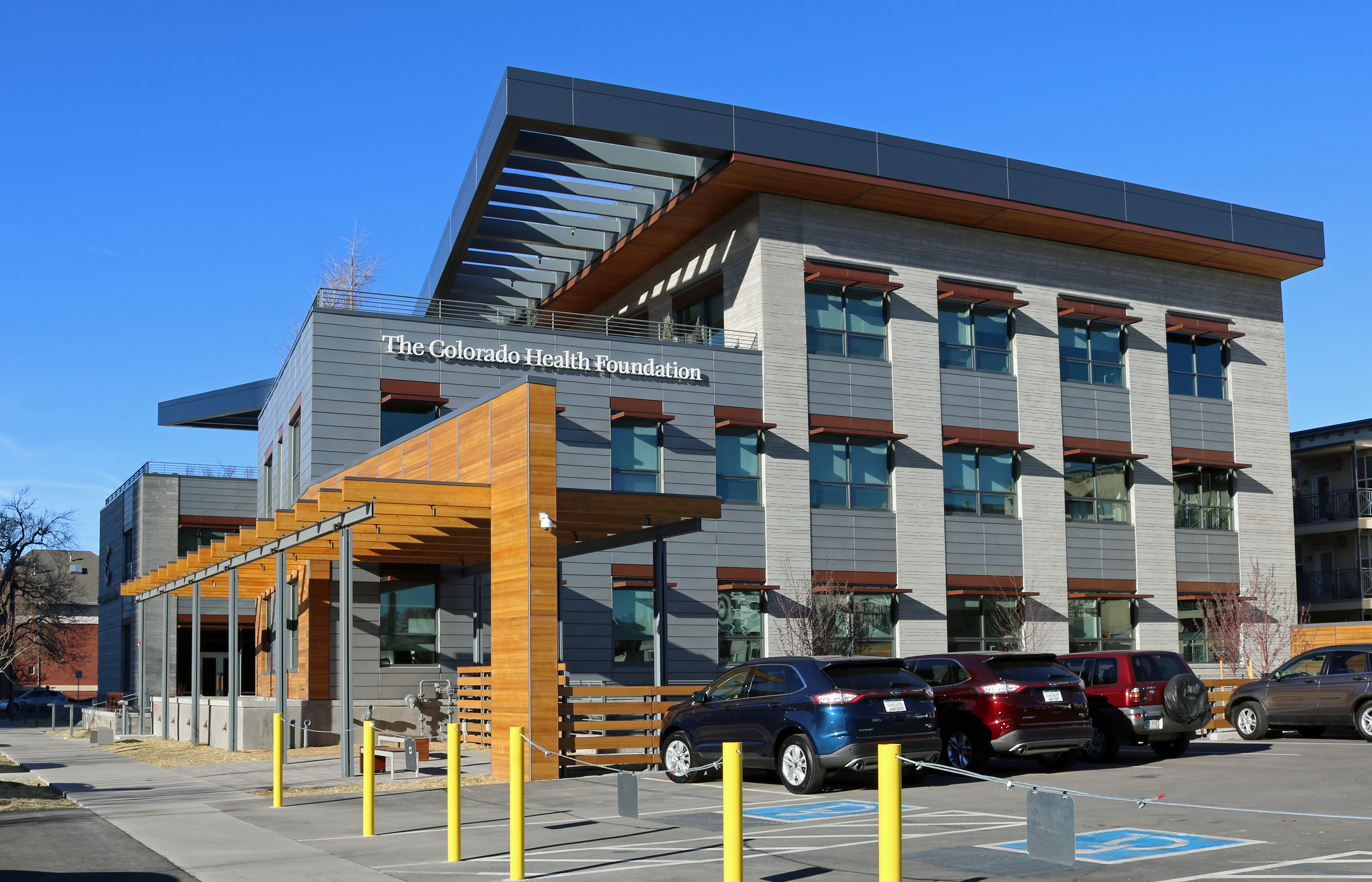
- The Foundation's offices at 1780 Pennsylvania St. in Denver.
- Founded: 1995; 31 years ago (as HealthONE Alliance)
- Type: Nonprofit
- Location: Denver, Colorado, U.S.
- Region served: Colorado
- Endowment: $2.6 billion
- Website: coloradohealth.org
- Formerly called: HealthOne Alliance Colorado

The Colorado Health Foundation is a private foundation focused on health. The organization's partners include nonprofits, health care leaders, policymakers, educators and the private sector.

The Foundation operates within four focus areas: Maintain Healthy Bodies, Nurture Healthy Minds, Strengthen Community Health and Champion Health Equity.

As of 2017, the Foundation had assets of $2.6 billion. It awarded $80 million in grants and contributions throughout Colorado the same year.

== History ==
In 1995, HCA-HealthONE LLC began as a joint venture between various affiliates of HCA and Denver's HealthOne hospitals. The purpose and intent of the original joint venture was to improve HealthOne hospitals. The HealthONE Foundation assumed the trade name of HealthONE Alliance in 1999.

In 2006, HealthONE Alliance changed its name to the Colorado Health Foundation.

On October. 13, 2011, Colorado Attorney General John Suthers approved the sale of the Foundation's 40 percent equity stake in Denver-area's HCA-HealthONE LLC health care system for $1.45 billion. In 2013, it created and seed funded an independent 501(c)(4) advocacy organization, Healthier Colorado.^{[5]}

President and CEO Anne Warhover stepped down from the Foundation in 2014 after leading the organization for 10 years. President and CEO Karen McNeil-Miller joined the Foundation in September 2015 from the Kate B. Reynolds Trust in North Carolina.

== Grantmaking ==
The Colorado Health Foundation funds work that aligns with the organization’s 10 priorities: Primary Care; Children Move More; Early Childhood Social-Emotional Development; Youth and Young Adult Resiliency; Adult Recovery; Community Solutions; Food Access and Security; Affordable Housing; Advocacy; and Capacity Building.

The Foundation makes grants available through funding opportunities, a responsive grants program and rapid response funding. Applications for rapid response funding, meant to support short-term advocacy initiatives, are accepted on a rolling basis.

== Funding initiatives ==
Prior to 2017, the Colorado Health Foundation structured its funding activity across three areas: Healthy Living, Health Care and Health Coverage.

In 2016, the Foundation made a $3 million program-related investment to establish the Colorado Healthy Housing Fund. The revolving fund provides loans for affordable housing that meet predetermined healthy housing criteria and design features.

In 2013, the Foundation invested $7.1 million in the public-private project, called the Colorado Fresh Food Financing Fund. The money helped retailers build and open grocery stores in areas where they were sparse, especially in low-income neighborhoods.

In 2012, the Foundation launched Healthy Places, a $4.5 million initiative to support the development of healthy communities in Colorado. Three communities, representing an urban, suburban or rural environment, each received three years of funding to implement a set of community-led project recommendations that promote physically active lifestyles.

In 2010, the Foundation announced it was investing $6.5 million to the Colorado Health Service Corps to repay student loans for doctors and other primary care health professionals. These professionals each made a three-year commitment to practice in a Federally Qualified Health Center (FQHC), rural health clinic or other safety net facility in a rural or underserved urban community. The investment to the CHSC was administered by the Primary Care Office of the Colorado Department of Health & Environment (CDPHE).

== Senior Management ==
=== Executive Team ===
- Karen McNeil-Miller, President and CEO
- Mark Evans, Chief Financial Officer
- Amy Latham, Chief Impact Officer
- Erin Brown, Vice President, Philanthropy

=== Board of directors ===
The Foundation’s Board of Directors is made up of 15 members and includes representatives from the fields of business, health care, education and philanthropy.
