= Denver Fire Department =

Fire department in Denver, Colorado

Coordinates: 39.7392°N 104.9850°W

Operational area
- Country: United States
- State: Colorado
- City: Denver

Agency overview
- Established: 1866
- Annual calls: 118,826 (2019)
- Employees: 1018(2016)
- Annual budget: $153,296,000 (2020, appropriated)
- Staffing: Career
- Fire chief: Desmond Fulton
- IAFF: 858
- Motto: "Everyone Comes Home"

Facilities and equipment
- Battalions: 7
- Stations: 39
- Engines: 33
- Trucks: 9
- Platforms: 8
- Rescues: 2
- HAZMAT: 1
- Airport crash: 7
- Wildland: 3
- Rescue boats: 1
- Light and air: 1

Website
- Official website
- IAFF website

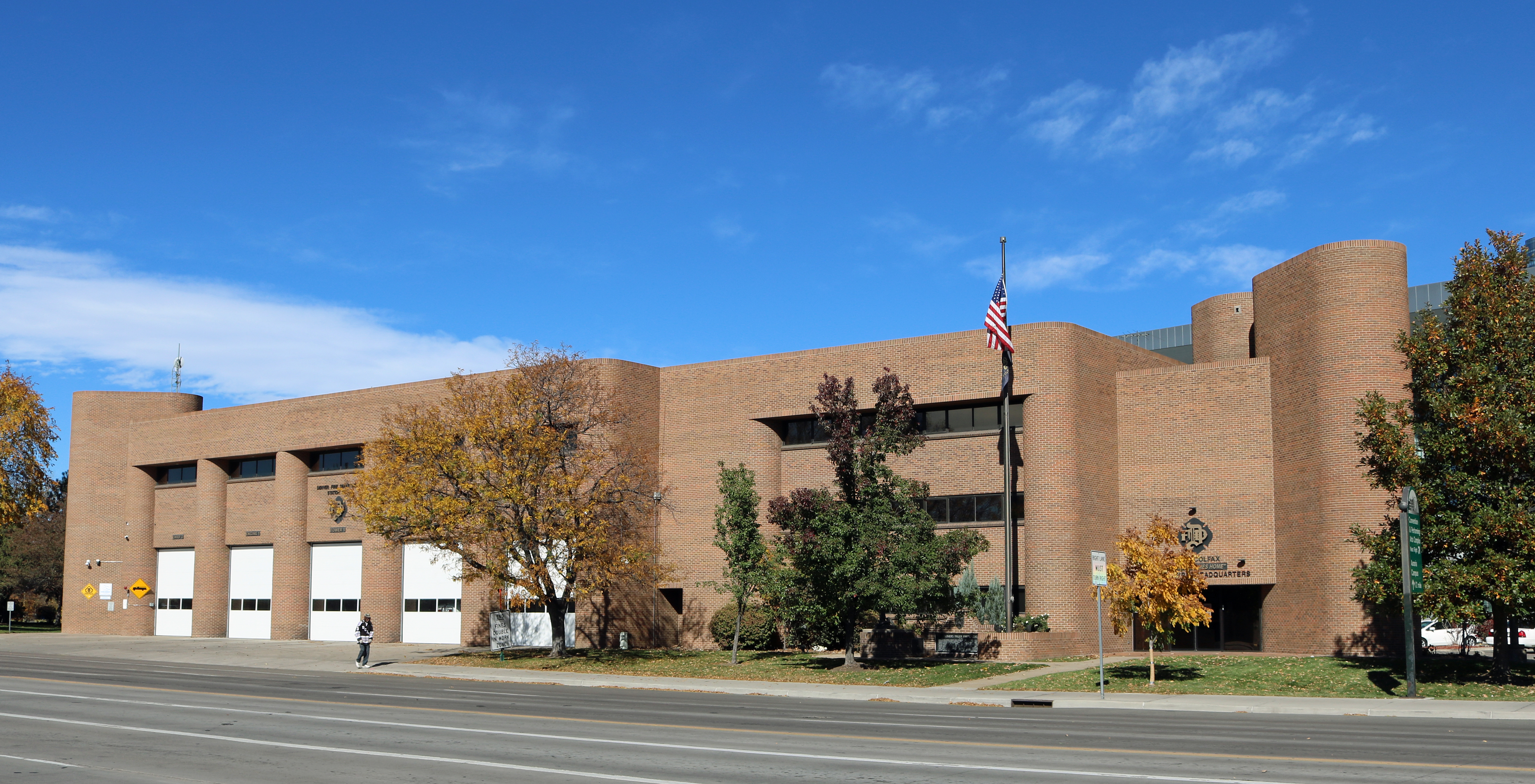
Denver Fire Department's Station 1 and headquarters on West Colfax Avenue.

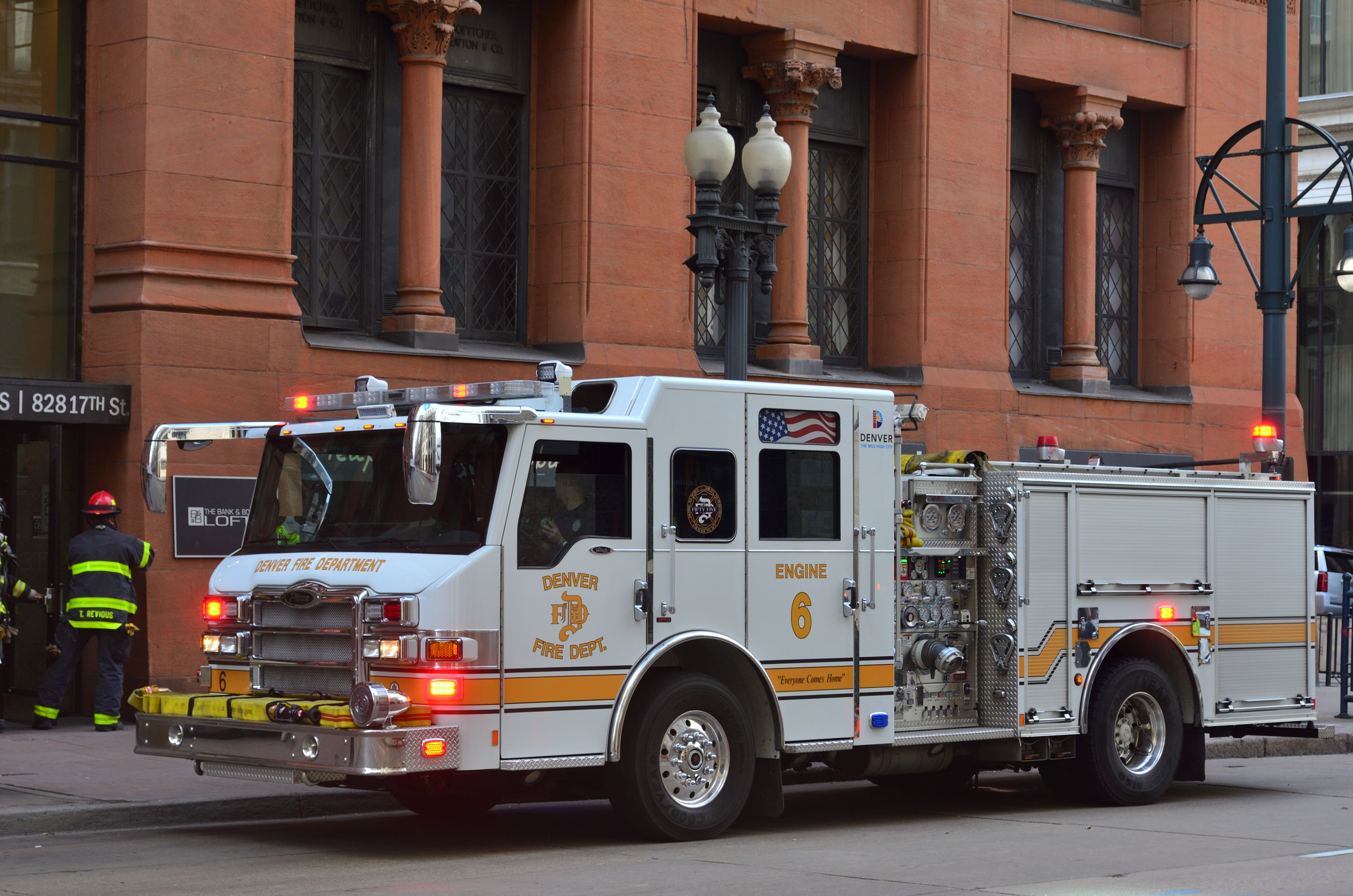
Fire engine of the Denver Fire Department.

The Denver Fire Department (DFD) provides fire protection and first responder emergency medical services to the city of Denver, Colorado. The department is responsible for an area of 155 square miles (400 km^{2}) with a population estimated at 690,000. The Denver Fire Department also provides fire protection to the citizens of Glendale, Sheridan, Skyline, and Englewood.

== History ==
The Denver Fire Department got its start on March 25, 1866 when a volunteer fire department was organized. Known as Volunteer Hook and Ladder Co. #1, the company was the first in the Colorado Territory.

== Stations and apparatus ==
As of 2015, the Denver Fire Department operates out of 39 fire stations (including 5 Airport Stations), located throughout the city in 7 Districts, each under the command of a District Chief.

Fire Station Number	Neighborhood	Engine Company	Truck Company or Tower Company	Special Unit(s)	Command Units	District
1	Downtown	Engine 1	Tower 1	Water Rescue, Collapse Rescue	OPS-2 (Shift Commander)	2
2	Gateway	Engine 2	Truck 2 (Quint)	Engine 301 (Type 3 WUI), Mobile Air Trailer	District Chief 5	5
3	Five Points	Engine 3				2
4	Lower Downtown		Truck 4	MED 1	District Chief 2	2
5	Glendale	Engine 5				3
6	Auraria	Engine 6		Decon Unit, HAMER 2/Air Shovel		2
7	Highland	Engine 7				6
8	Capitol Hill	Engine 8	Truck 8			4
9	Globeville	Engine 9	Tower 9	HAMER 1		6
10	Cole	Engine 10		Rescue 2		4
11	Baker	Engine 11		Rescue 1		2
12	Highland	Engine 12	Truck 12		District Chief 6	6
13	Hampden	Engine 13		Brush 602 (Type 6)		3
14	Montclair	Engine 14				4
15	City Park	Engine 15	Tower 15		District Chief 4	4
16	University of Denver	Engine 16	Truck 16	Air/Light 16		3
17	Berkeley	Engine 17				6
18	Lowry	Engine 18		MCCU		4
19	Lowry	Engine 19	Truck 19			4
20	Barnum	Engine 20		MED 2|		6
21	Washington Park	Engine 21		HAMER 3		3
22	Hampden	Engine 22	Tower 22			3
23	Westwood	Engine 23	Tower 23			7
24	University Hills	Engine 24			District Chief 3	3
25	Harvey Park	Engine 25				7
26	Central Park	Engine 26	Truck 26	MDU		5
27	Montbello	Engine 27	Tower 27			5
28	Fort Logan	Engine 28	Truck 28		District Chief 7	7
29	Green Valley Ranch	Engine 29		Brush 601 (Type 6)		5
30	Grant Ranch	Engine 30				7
31	Denver International		Tower 31 (Quint)	Mini 31, Stair Unit 21, Mobile Command, Red 1, Red 2, Red 3		8
32	Denver International	Engine 32		Mini 32, Stair Unit 22	District Chief 8	8
33	Denver International			Red 5, Red 6, Red 8		8
34	Denver International			Red 4, Red 12		8
35	Denver International	Engine 35	Tower 35 (Quint)	Mini 35, DGRT, Snow Cat		8
36	Sheridan	Engine 36				7
37	Englewood	Engine 37		Denver Health Paramedics Medic 837		7
38	Englewood		Truck 38 (Quint)	Denver Health Paramedics Medic 838		7
39	Central Park	Engine 39				5

== Notable Incidents ==
=== United Airlines Flight 859 ===
In July 1961, United Airlines Flight 859 crashed during landing at the now defunct Stapleton International Airport. The aircraft, a Douglas DC-8 airliner, slammed into several airport vehicles, including construction equipment, and caught fire, killing 18 (including one on the ground) and injuring 84 from a total of 122 people on board. This incident sparked the need for the DFD to place foam engines at the airport.

=== Continental Airlines Flight 1713 ===
On November 15, 1987, a Douglas DC-9-14 Continental Airlines Flight 1713 crashed while taking off in a snowstorm from Stapleton International Airport. Twenty-five passengers and three crew members died in the crash.

=== Continental Airlines Flight 1404 ===
On December 20, 2008, Continental Airlines Flight 1404 from Denver International Airport to George Bush Intercontinental Airport crashed while taking off from Denver resulting in 2 critical injuries, 36 non-critical injuries and a hull loss of the Boeing 737-524 aircraft.
