= Rose Medical Center =

Hospital in Denver, Colorado, U.S.

- Hospital Corporation of America
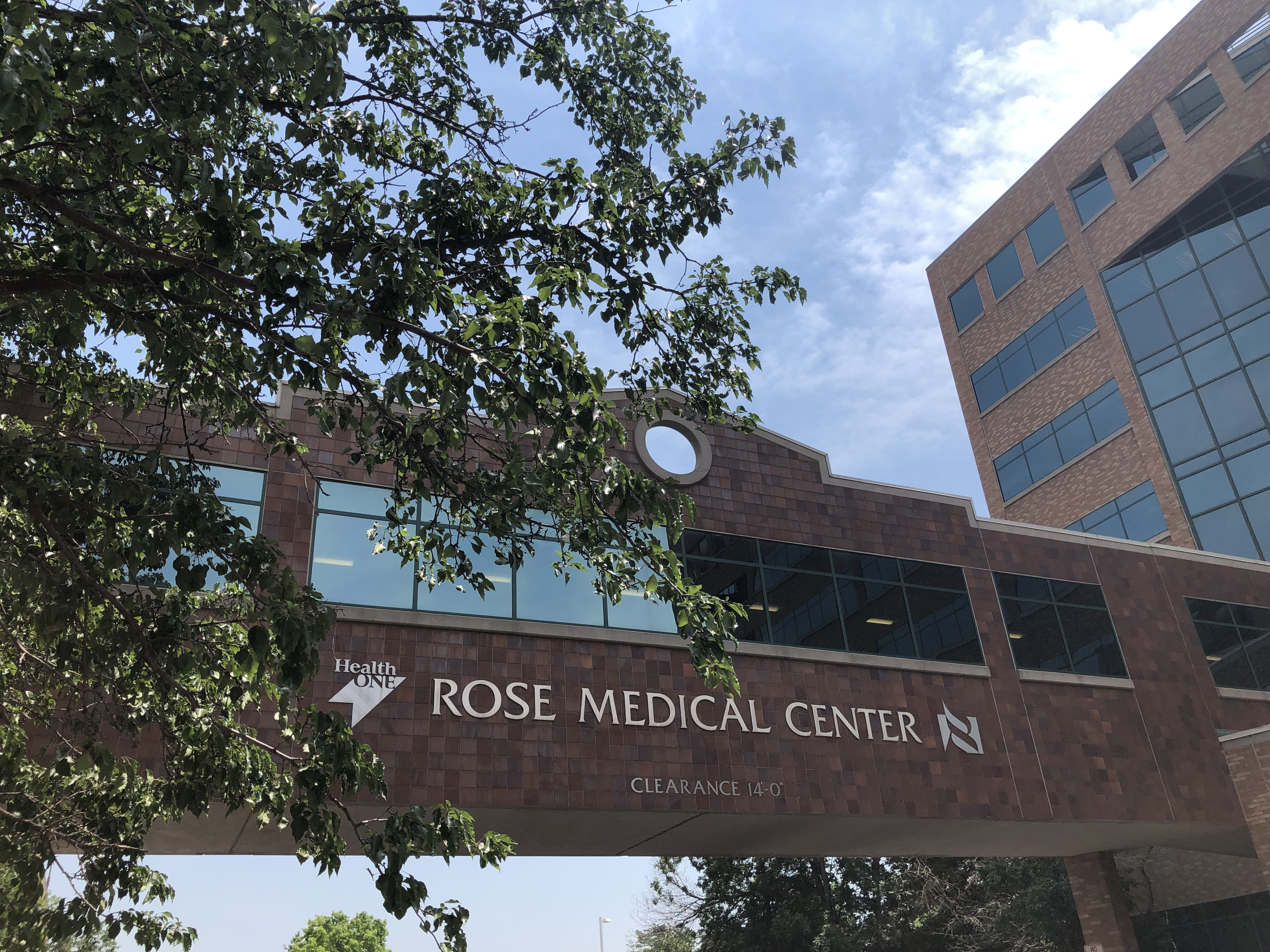

Geography
- Location: 4567 East 9th Avenue, Denver, Colorado, United States
- Coordinates: 39.731°N 104.9343°W

Organization
- Care system: Private
- Type: General, Teaching

Services
- Emergency department: Level IV trauma center
- Beds: 422

History
- Founded: 1949

Links
- Website: rosemed.com
- Lists: Hospitals in Colorado

Rose Medical Center is a part of HCA Healthcare's HealthONE network. It is colloquially known as Denver's "Baby Hospital," but also provides comprehensive women's care, orthopedics and total joint replacement, heart and vascular care, weight-loss treatment, cancer care, surgical services, internal medicine and emergency care. An acute care hospital with 422 licensed beds, Rose cares for more than 160,000 patients annually with a team of 1,300 full-time employees, 100 volunteers and more than 1,200 physicians. The medical center is a Level IV trauma center. Casey Guber is the President and chief executive officer.

Rose Medical Center was founded in 1945 by a group of Jewish community leaders who wanted to create a hospital that was free of discrimination. Following a national fundraising campaign, the new hospital was named in honor of a prominent Denver figure, Major General Maurice Rose, one of the highest-ranking members of the military to die in the field of combat. The cornerstone of the main building of the hospital was laid by General Dwight D. Eisenhower on August 31, 1948, and General Rose Memorial Hospital opened for patients in March 1949. Rose gave credentials to the first African American physician in the state of Colorado.

== Awards and recognition ==
In 2017, Rose Medical Center became a Magnet® designated hospital. The Magnet program designates organizations worldwide where nursing leaders successfully align their nursing strategic goals to improve the organization's patient outcomes. Rose has been recognized 12 times as one of the nation's 100 Top Hospitals® by IBM Watson Health and has earned the Healthgrades 2019 Patient Safety Excellence Award™ and the Healthgrades 2019 Outstanding Patient Experience Award™ for five years running. Rose is among the top 2% of eligible hospitals in the nation to receive both awards. Rose also has earned Straight As from the Leapfrog Group recognizing patient safety since the program began –an achievement earned by less than 1% of hospitals surveyed nationwide. U.S. News & World Report ranked Rose #4 in Colorado and Denver Metro for Best Hospital and as ‘High Performing’ in Seven Adult Procedures and Conditions for 2018–19. Its employees have named Rose a Denver Post Top Workplace each year from 2014–present.

== Medical programs ==
=== Bariatrics ===
Rose Medical Center has an extensive bariatric surgery program, combining clinical excellence with educational efforts. The program is a Bariatric Center of Excellence, as designated by the American Society for Metabolic and Bariatric Surgery.

=== Rose Babies ===
Rose Medical birthing facility reports over 4,000 births a year. Famous births include Ashley Bush. Rose Babies established its place in local memory in 1984 with a television ad featuring images of babies born at Rose floating through the clouds. The advertising campaign was revived in the late 1990s as the hospital's 50th anniversary approached and today, as the hospital approaches its 70th anniversary, the program is recognizing many generations of Rose Babies.

=== Cancer care ===
Sarah Cannon Cancer Institute at Rose Medical Center offers care for breast cancer, blood cancer, leukemia and lymphoma, colorectal cancer, endocrine cancers, kidney cancer, lung cancer and gynecologic cancers.

=== Heart and vascular care ===
The Heart & Vascular Care program at Rose places among the top performing hospitals in the nation for average door-to-treatment time for heart attack patients by NCDR and ACC. The program also has received numerous accreditations from the American College of Cardiology, including Accredited Cardiac Cath Lab with PCI; Accredited Atrial Fibrillation; Accredited Chest Pain Center with Primary PCI; Accredited by the American Association of Cardiovascular and Pulmonary Rehabilitation.

=== Orthopedics & total joint replacement ===
The Rose Orthopedic and Spine Center is a fully integrated program that offers orthopedic and spine surgeries. In spring 2016, the hospital opened a fully renovated unit to accommodate patients who need spine care, sports medicine treatment, knee, shoulder and hip replacements.

=== Women's care ===
Rose's comprehensive women's health care program includes gynecology, preventative care, obstetric care, heart care, cancer care, mammograms and post-menopausal care. In 2016, Rose launched an advertising campaign featuring women who have received care at the hospital throughout their lifetime.

On March 8, 2022, Rose Women's Hospital, a comprehensive reorganization and expansion of women's services at Rose Medical Center, was announced.

== Campus ==
- Main Hospital Building (4567 East 9th Avenue)
- Rose Orthopedic & Spine Center/Goodstein Family Pavilion addition (1961)
- Physician Office Building 1 (4545 East 9th Avenue)
- Physician Office Building 2 (4500 East 9th Avenue)
- Wolf Building (4600 Hale Parkway, opened 1996), housing outpatient surgery and doctors' offices
- Rose Founders Building (4700 Hale Parkway, opened 2006), housing medical oncology, radiation oncology, mammography and outpatient surgery
