= St. Luke's Medical Center (Denver) =

Coordinates: 39.7468°N 104.9674°W

Presbyterian/St. Luke's Medical Center
- HealthONE Colorado
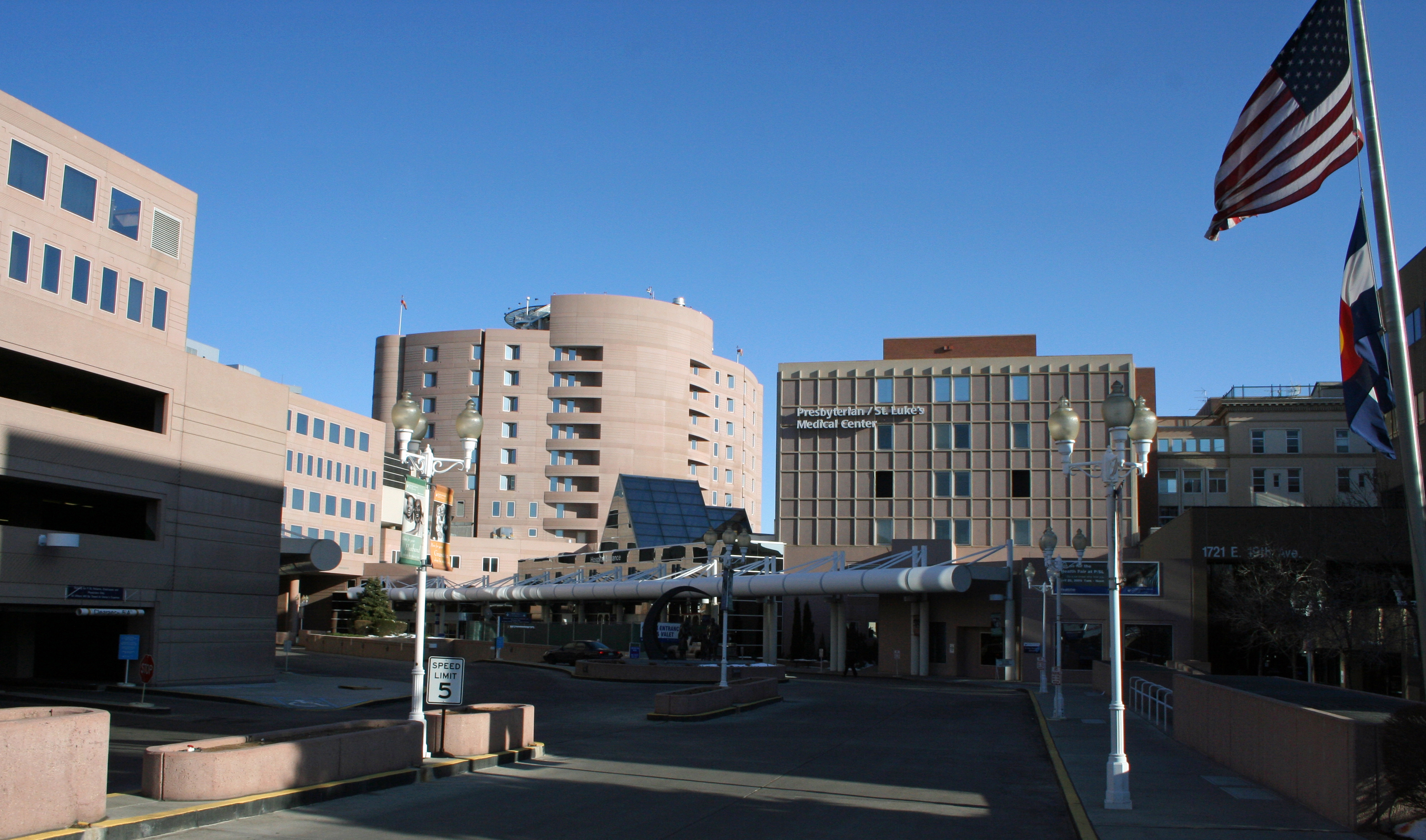

Geography
- Location: 1719 East 19th Avenue, Denver, Colorado, United States

Organization
- Type: General

Services
- Beds: 680

History
- Founded: June 27, 1881

Links
- Website: http://www.pslmc.com/
- Lists: Hospitals in Colorado

Presbyterian/St. Luke's Medical Center is a hospital in the City Park West neighborhood of Denver. In speech and in writing, the hospital is referred to informally by its initials: P/SL.

== History ==
Presbyterian/St. Luke's Medical Center was not always one hospital. It was originally two separate hospitals: St. Luke's Hospital, which admitted its first patient on June 27, 1881, and Denver Presbyterian Hospital, which opened in 1926. Both operated separately until Columbia Health/HealthONE acquired both in 1992 and the old St. Luke's facility was closed. Patients were then moved and consolidated in the Presbyterian facility, which remains the current site. Presbyterian/St. Luke's Medical Center has 680 beds and a staff of 1,428 employees. The hospital has many buildings that are newly constructed, although parts of the original cross-shaped building, dating from the 1940s, are still visible.

Presbyterian/St. Luke's Medical Center has always made use of the latest technology. As early as the 1920s, the founders of St. Luke's Medical Center introduced state of the art x-ray machines and treated cancer patients with new radiation technology.

In 1933 St. Luke's Medical Center opened its first cancer clinic. It was the first center of its kind in the Rocky Mountain Region as well as one of the first centers in the entire United States dedicated especially to cancer treatment. St. Luke's opened the regions first intensive care unit in 1961, and Presbyterian followed suit shortly after in the same year. After the use of helicopters as medivacs in the Korean War, they were adapted for post war use.

In March 1971, an operating theater at St. Luke's was converted to a clean room. This created an operating environment that could sustain safeguards for the protection of patients during infection-prone orthopedic chest surgeries. Buoyed by the success of their two-year pilot program, the doctors were able to obtain a grant from the National Aeronautics and Space Administration (NASA) to construct a state-of-the-art Laminar Flow Clean Room, complete with helmets and fully enclosed astronaut-style suits (which are still in use today). NASA provided the funding; Martin Marietta executed the blueprints and St. Luke's saw a reduction in post-operative infection from 9% to less than 0.5%.

In 1985, St. Luke's Hospital performed its first kidney transplant followed by its first heart transplant 3 years later. In 1991 the first bone marrow transplant was successfully performed. The hospital introduced advancements in robotic surgery in 2003.
