= St. Anthony Hospital (Colorado) =

- CommonSpirit Health
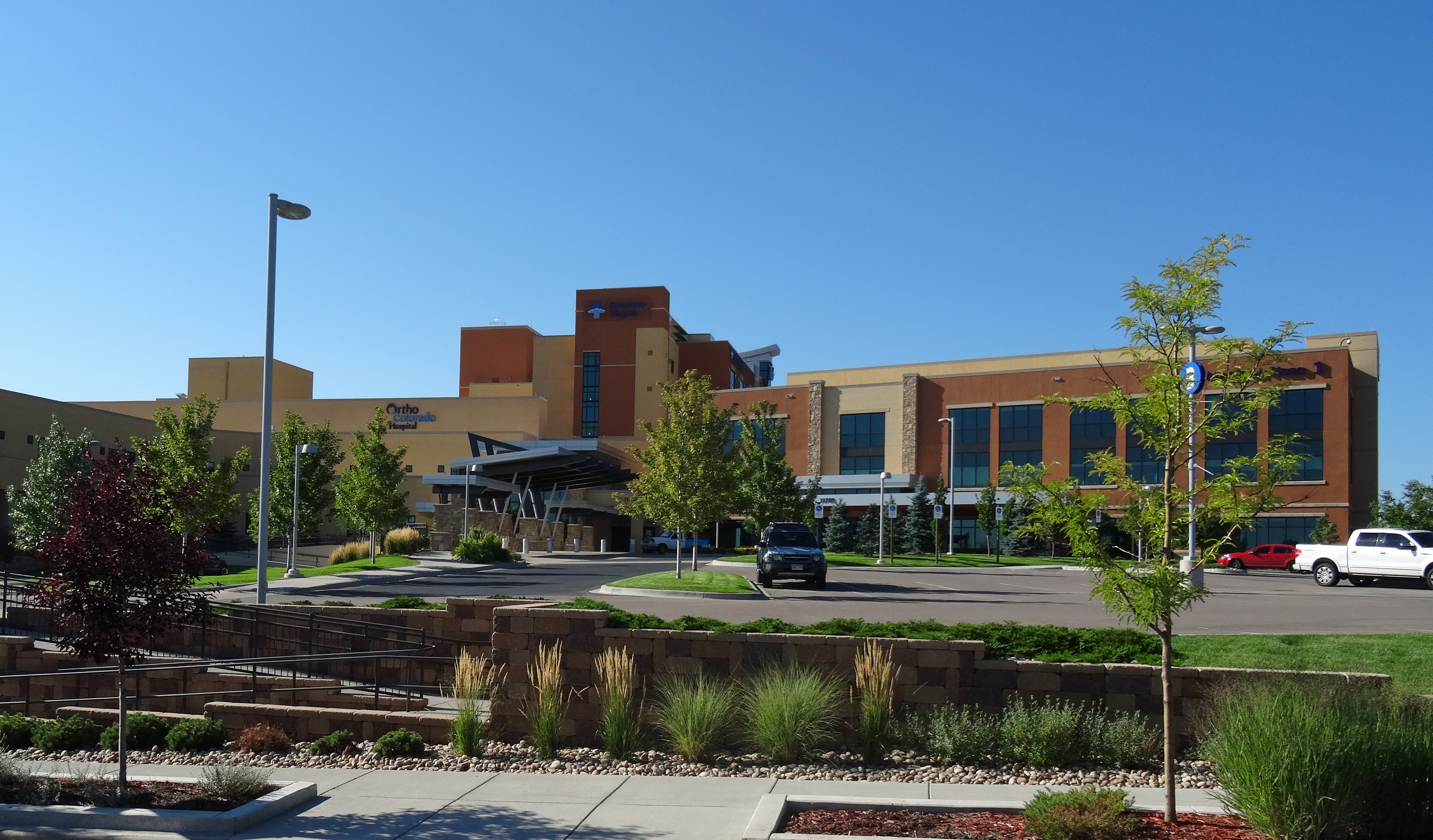
- St. Anthony Hospital in 2013.

Geography
- Location: 11600 W. 2nd Place, Lakewood, Colorado, United States
- Coordinates: 39.7164°N 105.1292°W

Organization
- Type: General

Services
- Emergency department: Level I trauma center
- Beds: 224

Helipads
- Helipad: FAA LID: 42CO
Number	Length		Surface
Number	ft	m	Surface
H1	100 x 100	30 × 30	Mats
H2	45 x 45	14 × 14	Asphalt/Concrete

Links
- Website: www.centura.org/locations/st-anthony-hospital
- Lists: Hospitals in Colorado

St. Anthony Hospital, previously known as St. Anthony Central Hospital, is one of six Level I Trauma Centers in Colorado. The hospital is currently located at W. 2nd Pl and Routt St near the Denver Federal Center in Lakewood, Colorado. The hospital was previously located at W. 16th Ave and Raleigh St, in the West Colfax neighborhood of Denver.

St Anthony's is part of CommonSpirit Health.

== History ==
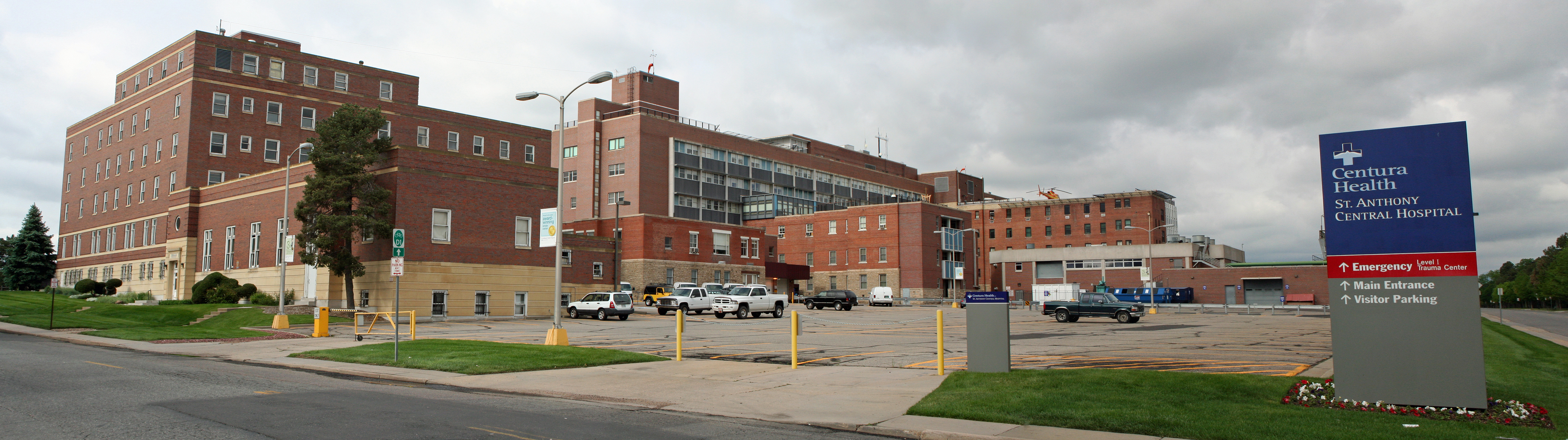
The previous location of St. Anthony Central Hospital located in Denver

Starting as a dream of the Sisters of St. Francis, the hospital was opened in 1892. and dedicated on June 13, 1893.

In 2011, the hospital was moved to a new campus and renamed to St. Anthony Hospital in the process. The transition to the new campus occurred in two stages with the new Emergency Department opening on June 17, 2011, and the main hospital opening on June 20, 2011. As of August 2019, The CEO of St. Anthony Hospital is Peter Powers and the COO is Mary Albers.

In 2023, the two healthcare organizations that joined to form Centura disaffiliated and became two separate health networks again, one called CommonSpirit Health (the successor to Catholic Health Initiatives) and one called AdventHealth. As of August 1, 2023, St. Anthony Hospital is part of the CommonSpirit Health network.

== Emergency Medical Services ==
St Anthony Flight for Life service began in 1972. Flight for Life was the first airborne ambulance service in the nation.

The nation's first EMT and paramedic academy was started in 1974 at St Anthony Central.

St. Anthony provides medical directorship to over 50 prehospital agencies, to include fire departments, ambulance services, search and rescue organizations, and certain law enforcement agencies

== See also ==
- Denver Health Medical Center
- Swedish Medical Center (Colorado)
- Flight for Life
