= HCA HealthONE Swedish =

General hospital in Englewood, Colorado

- HCA HealthONE Colorado
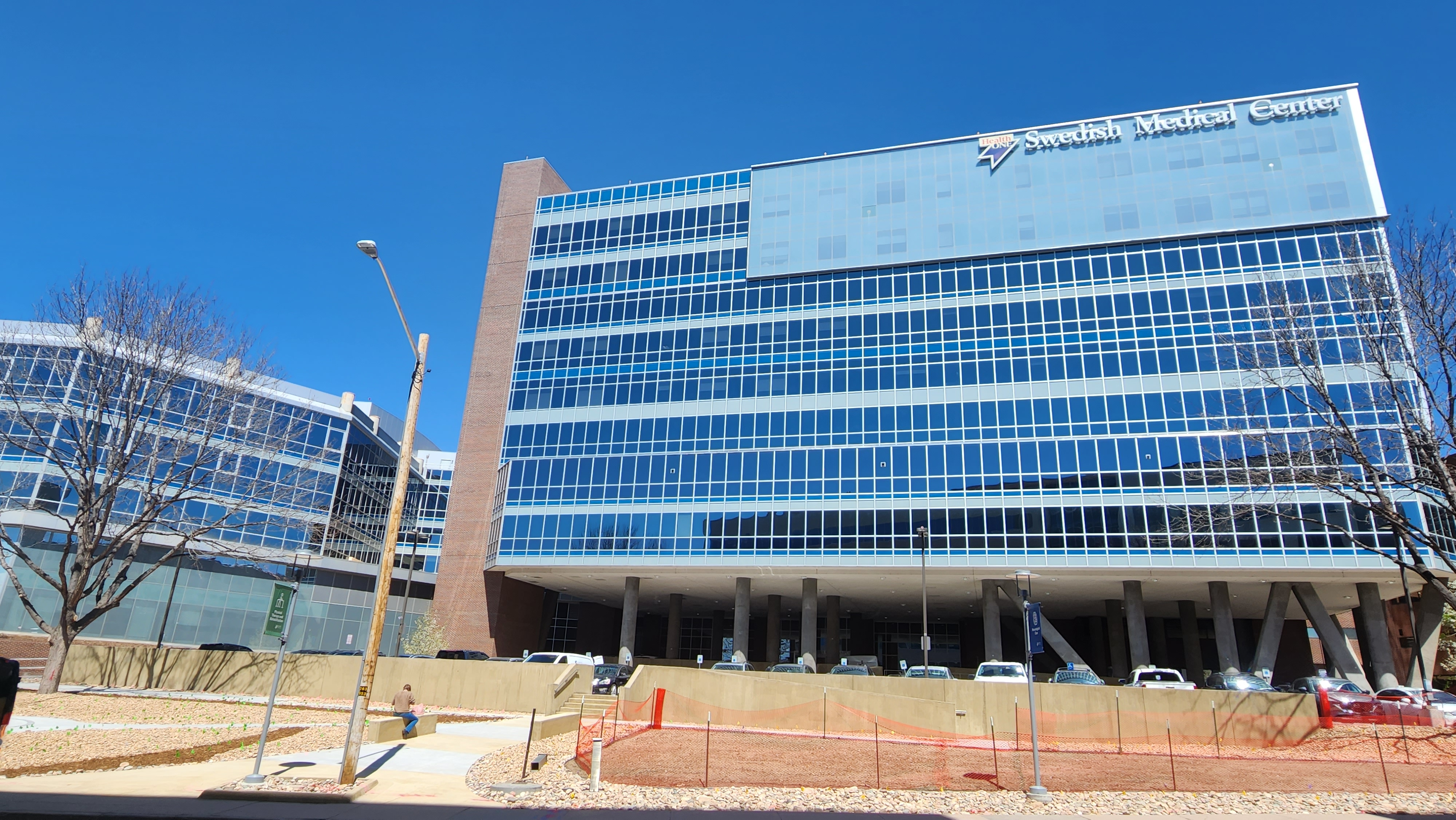
- HCA HealthONE Swedish in 2024

Geography
- Location: 501 East Hampden Avenue, Englewood, Colorado, United States
- Coordinates: 39.6534°N 104.9816°W

Organization
- Type: General

Services
- Emergency department: Level I trauma center
- Beds: 504

History
- Founded: 1905

Links
- Website: hcahealthone.com/Swedish
- Lists: Hospitals in the United States

HCA HealthONE Swedish (formerly Swedish Medical Center) is a 504-bed acute care hospital located in Englewood, Colorado, United States. It is a Level I trauma and burn center serving Colorado and the Rocky Mountain region. It is operated by HCA HealthONE, part of HCA Healthcare's Continental Division.

== History ==
Swedish Medical Center was founded in 1905 in Colorado as a tuberculosis sanatorium. In 1924, the hospital was expanded with funds donated by the Swedish Women of Chicago. In 1956, with the decline of TB as a major health threat, the hospital's focus turned to general healthcare.

Swedish Medical Center was the first hospital in Colorado to use MRI and CT technology, as well as angiography. Swedish is a regional referral center for neurotrauma and in 2003 it was designated one of the three Level I Trauma Centers in Colorado. Swedish also became the first Comprehensive Stroke Center in Colorado in 2004.

Wayne F.J. Yakes, M.D. founded the Vascular Malformation Center in 1991. It is one of the only centers in the world that dedicates its care to the management of vascular malformations in all anatomic locations.

Swedish employs more than 2,000 people and has a medical staff of 1,400 physicians and allied health professionals. The hospital runs a health clinic at nearby Englewood High School.

Swedish was named one of the "100 Top Hospitals" in the nation by IBM Watson Health in 2020.

In 2016, the hospital warned patients that they may have been exposed to Hepatitis B, Hepatitis C and HIV as a result of a former employee's alleged drug tampering.

== See also ==
- Denver Health Medical Center
- St. Anthony Hospital (Colorado)
