= Denver Health =

Denver Health Medical Center
- Denver Health and Hospital Authority
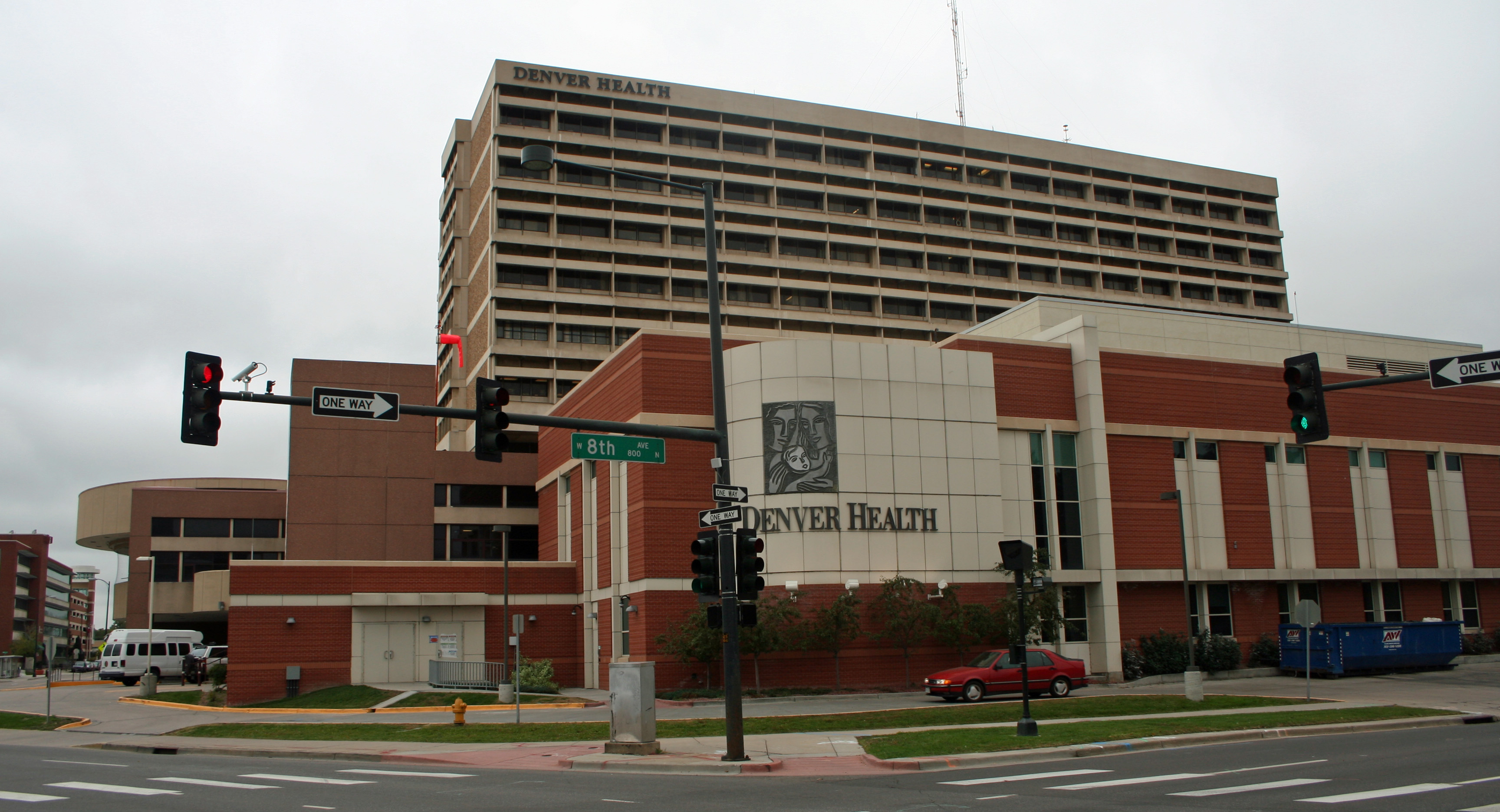

Geography
- Location: 777 Bannock Street, Denver, Colorado, United States
- Coordinates: 39.7281°N 104.9911°W

Organization
- Type: General
- Affiliated university: University of Colorado School of Medicine

Services
- Emergency department: Level I trauma center
- Beds: 525

Helipads
- Helipad: FAA LID: CO35
Number	Length		Surface
Number	ft	m	Surface
H1	42 x 40	13 × 12	Concrete
H2	40 x 40	12 × 12	Concrete

History
- Founded: 1860

Links
- Website: denverhealth.org
- Lists: Hospitals in Colorado

Denver Health Medical Center, formerly named Denver General Hospital, is a hospital in the Lincoln Park neighborhood of Denver, founded in 1860. It is one of seven Level I Trauma Centers in Colorado. Denver Health is one of the primary teaching hospitals in Denver and is affiliated with the University of Colorado School of Medicine.

== History ==
Denver Health Medical Center was established in 1860 as City Hospital. The hospital was founded near 11th and Wazee, but in 1873, a new medical center was built at the corner of 6th Avenue and Cherokee; this is where Denver Health Main Campus is located to this day. Denver Health has gone by many names, including City Hospital, the Poor House, County Hospital, Arapahoe County Hospital, Denver General Hospital in 1923, and now Denver Health Medical Center in 1997.

The hospital was well known for founding the first nursing school west of the Mississippi and for being one of the earliest facilities for treating tuberculosis.

The hospital employed many health care visionaries, including Florence Sabin, who was instrumental in creating a functional public health department.

In 1989, a book was written about the Denver General emergency room, The Knife and Gun Club, Scenes from an Emergency Room by photographer Eugene Richards which received an Award of Excellence from the American College of Emergency Physicians. The book is a collection of stories taken from the emergency department and ambulances. The emergency room of Denver Health gained the nickname "Knife and Gun Club" due to the frequency of knife and gun related injuries.

== Governance ==
Denver Health Medical Center is part of the Denver Health and Hospital Authority, abbreviated to Denver Health, an integrated health care system that consists of the main hospital, 911 response and EMS, poison and toxicology, family health centers, school-based clinics, detoxification services, correctional care, and medical response to terrorism, mass casualties and epidemics. The Authority is governed by an eleven-member Board of Directors who are appointed for five years by the Mayor of Denver and confirmed by the Denver City Council. Denver Health's CEO is Donna Lynne, DrPH.

The hospital was previously a component of the Denver government under the Denver Department of Health and Hospitals. Challenges encountered from this model of governance included a lack of purchasing authority, a lack of centralized governance, and a history of budget deficits.

The Authority was created by the Colorado General Assembly in 1994 as a political subdivision of the state. On January 1, 1997, the hospital and health system were transferred from Denver Department of Health and Hospitals to the Authority. Denver Health's successful governance change inspired Alameda County Medical Center's change to a hospital authority separate from the county.

=== Organization ===
Denver Health provides communicable disease surveillance and medically oriented public health functions through their Denver Public Health department. Through grant-funded programs, Denver Public Health conducts research on infectious diseases, including hepatitis surveillance; tuberculosis clinical trials; HIV/AIDS prevention, counseling, testing and treatment; and vaccine trials.

The Denver Department of Environmental Health manages and oversees the operating agreement to contract with Denver Health to provide services related to the medical investigations and medical services for disease control (including clinics) and the administration of vital birth and death records. Denver Department of Environmental Health and Denver Public Health work together to conduct communicable disease reporting, investigation, and control for Denver. Public and environmental health functions and regulatory authority remains with Denver Department of Environmental Health.

Denver Health's Denver Health Paramedic Division, a hospital-based paramedic service, is based out of Denver Health Medical Center, Pavilion A.

== See also ==
- St. Anthony Hospital (Colorado)
- Swedish Medical Center (Colorado)
