= COVID-19 pandemic in Colorado =

- Disease: COVID-19
- Pathogen: SARS-CoV-2
- Location: Colorado, U.S.
- First outbreak: International travelers who had visited Italy
- Index case: Summit County, Douglas County
- Arrival date: late-January 2020 (1st positive March 5)
- Confirmed cases: 1,808,780
- Deaths: 14,835

Government website
- covid19.colorado.gov

The COVID-19 pandemic reached Colorado on March 5, 2020, when the state's first two cases were confirmed. Many of the early COVID-19 cases in Colorado occurred in mountain resort towns such as Crested Butte, Aspen, and Vail, apparently brought in, and sometimes taken home, by international ski tourists.

In late 2020 a COVID-19 surge began in Colorado and most other mountain and Midwestern states, peaking in November/December. November 13's 6,437 COVID-19 cases and December 9's 267 COVID-related deaths set new single day records for Colorado. On June 29, 2021 Colorado public health authorities (CDPHE) reported 343 COVID-19 cases, increasing the state's cumulative total of new cases since the start of the pandemic to 557,347. Colorado's death toll is 6,788, with 12 new deaths reported over the past 24 hours. As of June 29, 9.67% of Colorado residents have been positively diagnosed with COVID-19. The 7-day moving average of new COVID-19 cases in Colorado is 316 cases per day. Despite a rise in spring 2021, there has been a general downward trend in the number of new COVID-19 cases since late November, when the 7 day moving average hit 5,064 on November 21, 2020.

Governor Jared Polis issued a statewide mask mandate in mid-July to avoid the sharp surge of COVID-19 cases and deaths then observed in Arizona, Texas, Florida, Georgia and other states where mask wearing was optional. A CDPHE web page explains the mask mandate and the science supporting the use of masks to reduce spread of respiratory diseases like COVID-19. Ten months later, Colorado's per capita COVID-19 death rate is less than half that of South Dakota, whose governor, Kristi Noem, most notably refused to issue a mask mandate despite a severe surge in cases in autumn 2020.

The return of college students to the University of Colorado Boulder campus quickly resulted in a dramatic spike in COVID-19 cases. The average two week case rate among 18-22 year olds in Boulder County rose from 200 cases in early September to 3,780 cases by the end of the month. The spike was limited to this narrow age group; the new case rate among all other age groups remained steady and low. The Boulder County Department of Public Health advised University of Colorado students to quarantine at home until October 5. The quarantine order proved effective, and by mid October the two week case rate among all age groups in Boulder County had dropped to 250 or lower.

In Colorado, major COVID-19 outbreaks occurred in meatpacking plants in Weld and Morgan Counties, prisons in Washington and Crowley Counties, and in agricultural facilities in the San Luis Valley such as a mushroom "factory" near Alamosa and a potato packing shed near Center. About half of COVID-19 deaths in Colorado have been associated with nursing homes.

As of June 29, 2021 Colorado had administered 6,177,682 COVID-19 vaccine doses, 7% more than the state's entire adult population. Since two doses are required for both the Pfizer and Moderna vaccines, the total number considered fully vaccinated is about 3 million residents, representing over 50 percent of the state's adult population.

== Timeline ==
COVID-19 pandemic medical cases in Colorado by county
County (Note: County where individuals with a positive case reside. Location of diagnosis and treatment may vary.)	Cases (Note: Reported confirmed and probable cases. Actual case numbers are probably higher.) (Note: Includes 279 international cases not assigned to any county.)	Deaths (Note: Includes 2 international deaths not assigned to any county.) (Note: Excludes 1 death from an unknown county.)	Population (Note: July 2019 population estimate from "U.S. Census Bureau Quick Facts: Colorado". United States Census Bureau.)	Cases / 100k
64 / 64	1,808,780	14,835	5,758,736	31,409.3
Adams	169,832	1,517	517,421	32,822.8
Alamosa	6,134	69	16,233	37,787.2
Arapahoe	201,707	1,442	656,590	30,720.4
Archuleta	3,644	25	14,029	25,974.8
Baca	1,104	21	3,581	30,829.4
Bent	3,034	51	5,577	54,402.0
Boulder	93,605	493	326,196	28,695.9
Broomfield (Note: Consolidated city-county)	18,876	140	70,465	26,787.8
Chaffee	5,801	59	20,356	28,497.7
Cheyenne	404	12	1,831	22,064.4
Clear Creek	1,960	15	9,700	20,206.2
Conejos	2,378	61	8,205	28,982.3
Costilla	1,001	19	3,887	25,752.5
Crowley	3,570	33	6,061	58,901.2
Custer	858	24	5,068	16,929.8
Delta	7,432	172	31,162	23,849.6
Denver	230,529	1,586	727,211	31,700.4
Dolores	431	9	2,055	20,973.2
Douglas	103,167	536	351,154	29,379.4
Eagle	19,120	41	55,127	34,683.5
El Paso	243,987	1,976	720,403	33,868.1
Elbert	5,940	47	26,729	22,223.1
Fremont	19,229	221	47,839	40,195.2
Garfield	18,365	110	60,061	30,577.2
Gilpin	1,194	7	6,243	19,125.4
Grand	4,087	30	15,734	25,975.6
Gunnison	4,000	17	17,462	22,906.9
Hinsdale	172	0	820	20,975.6
Huerfano	1,863	44	6,897	27,011.7
Jackson	200	0	1,392	14,367.8
Jefferson	164,642	1,636	582,881	28,246.2
Kiowa	395	7	1,406	28,093.9
Kit Carson	1,893	33	7,097	26,673.2
La Plata	16,194	111	56,221	28,804.2
Lake	2,199	2	8,127	27,058.0
Larimer	112,751	644	356,899	31,591.9
Las Animas	4,554	55	14,506	31,393.9
Lincoln	2,387	14	5,701	41,869.8
Logan	8,746	124	22,409	39,029.0
Mesa	53,236	665	154,210	34,521.8
Mineral	317	4	769	41,222.4
Moffat	3,853	56	13,283	29,007.0
Montezuma	7,996	100	26,183	30,538.9
Montrose	11,546	195	42,758	27,003.1
Morgan	7,183	154	29,068	24,711.0
Otero	5,468	137	18,278	29,915.7
Ouray	1,144	6	4,952	23,101.8
Park	3,571	24	18,845	18,949.3
Phillips	1,152	21	4,265	27,010.6
Pitkin	8,144	10	17,767	45,837.8
Prowers	3,352	55	12,172	27,538.6
Pueblo	63,842	905	168,424	37,905.5
Rio Blanco	2,269	16	6,324	35,879.2
Rio Grande	3,816	49	11,267	33,868.8
Routt	8,088	35	25,638	31,546.9
Saguache	1,592	14	6,824	23,329.4
San Juan	314	0	728	43,131.9
San Miguel	2,737	10	8,179	33,463.7
Sedgwick	597	13	2,248	26,556.9
Summit	12,169	15	31,011	39,240.9
Teller	6,080	74	25,388	23,948.3
Washington	1,281	36	4,908	26,100.2
Weld	108,989	809	324,492	33,587.6
Yuma	2,380	28	10,019	23,754.9
Final update October 4, 2023, with data through the previous Saturday; Data is publicly reported by Colorado Department of Public Health and Environment

=== March 2020 ===
On March 5, 2020 public health officials reported the first two cases of coronavirus in the state. The first known case was a man in his 30s visiting Summit County who had traveled to Italy in February with a companion who later tested positive for the virus. The second case was an elderly woman in Douglas County who had traveled on an international cruise. Both cases were considered presumptive positives; they had been tested by the state but had not been sent to the Centers for Disease Control and Prevention(CDC) for verification. (Note: The state later moved to consider presumptive positive cases as positive, without requiring additional verification from the CDC.)

On March 6, with six new cases of coronavirus, the case count climbed to eight, seven of whom had traveled abroad recently.

On March 10, Governor Jared Polis declared a state of emergency. Polis also announced 17 total presumptive positive cases in the state. The state announced a drive-up testing facility for patients with a doctor's note in Denver's Lowry neighborhood, at no charge to the patients.

On March 11, The University of Colorado Boulder (CU Boulder) cancelled the 72nd annual Conference on World Affairs. The Nederland Town Board of Trustees cancelled the annual Frozen Dead Guy Days, following a Boulder County Public Health recommendation. The event was scheduled for the weekend of March 13.

On March 12, a Post Malone concert at Denver's Pepsi Center proceeded as scheduled, drawing a sellout-crowd of 20,000, likely the largest enclosed gathering in the U.S. before widespread lockdowns.

On March 12, a CU Boulder employee received a presumptive positive test for COVID-19. The employee worked on March 9 from 8 a.m. to noon in limited areas of the Center for Community dining center. Despite Boulder County health's recommendations, the annual May Bolder Boulder race and the Boulder Creek Festival were still scheduled. Many major school districts, including Denver Public Schools, Jefferson County Public Schools and Cherry Creek Public Schools, announced closures lasting at least two weeks. Due to the current strain on medical facilities in mountain communities, Governor Jared Polis discouraged mountain travel for the elderly.

On March 13, Colorado reported its first COVID-19-related death: an 80-year-old woman with underlying health issues from El Paso County. To offset the loss of quarantined medical personnel, Governor Jared Polis asked former doctors and nurses to rejoin the stressed medical workforce. Due to low temperatures, the Lowry drive-up testing service did not operate. The state planned to move the drive-up testing to the Denver Coliseum, starting on March 14, subject to weather. The testing at the Coliseum would service a maximum of 150 patients. The Colorado Department of Public Health and Environment (CDPHE) also planned to move the drive-up service to strategic locations as warranted. In Aspen, 10 Australian ski vacationers were confirmed with the virus, with three others refusing testing. The three Australians who refused testing were quarantined for two weeks. Michael Larson, of Crested Butte, in Gunnison County, owner of Mikey's Pizza died from COVID-19, on March 13, 2020. His test for the coronavirus was done post-mortem, and received back on March 23, making his death the first in Gunnison County, and also one of the earliest in Colorado.

On March 14, the state legislature went into recess for two weeks. Governor Jared Polis issued an executive order to close downhill ski areas for a week, doing so "with a profound sense of pain and grim responsibility." Some ski areas had already planned to close on March 15.

On March 16, Denver Mayor Hancock ordered all bars and restaurants to close by 8 a.m. on March 17 (except for food delivery and pickup) and banned gatherings of more than 50 people. Governor Jared Polis expanded the closures by ordering a state-wide closure of dine-in services, gyms, casinos, and theaters.

On March 18, Governor Jared Polis closed schools until April 17 and banned gatherings of more than 10 people for the following 30 days. Polis also ordered ski resorts to remain closed until April 6. The governor also expressed frustration with nonchalance regarding social distancing and announced the creation of a fund to aid Coloradans affected by COVID-19. San Miguel County became the first county in the nation to plan to test all of its residents. It also ordered residents to "shelter-in-place." Gun sales skyrocket in Colorado, along with toilet paper, and hand sanitizer.

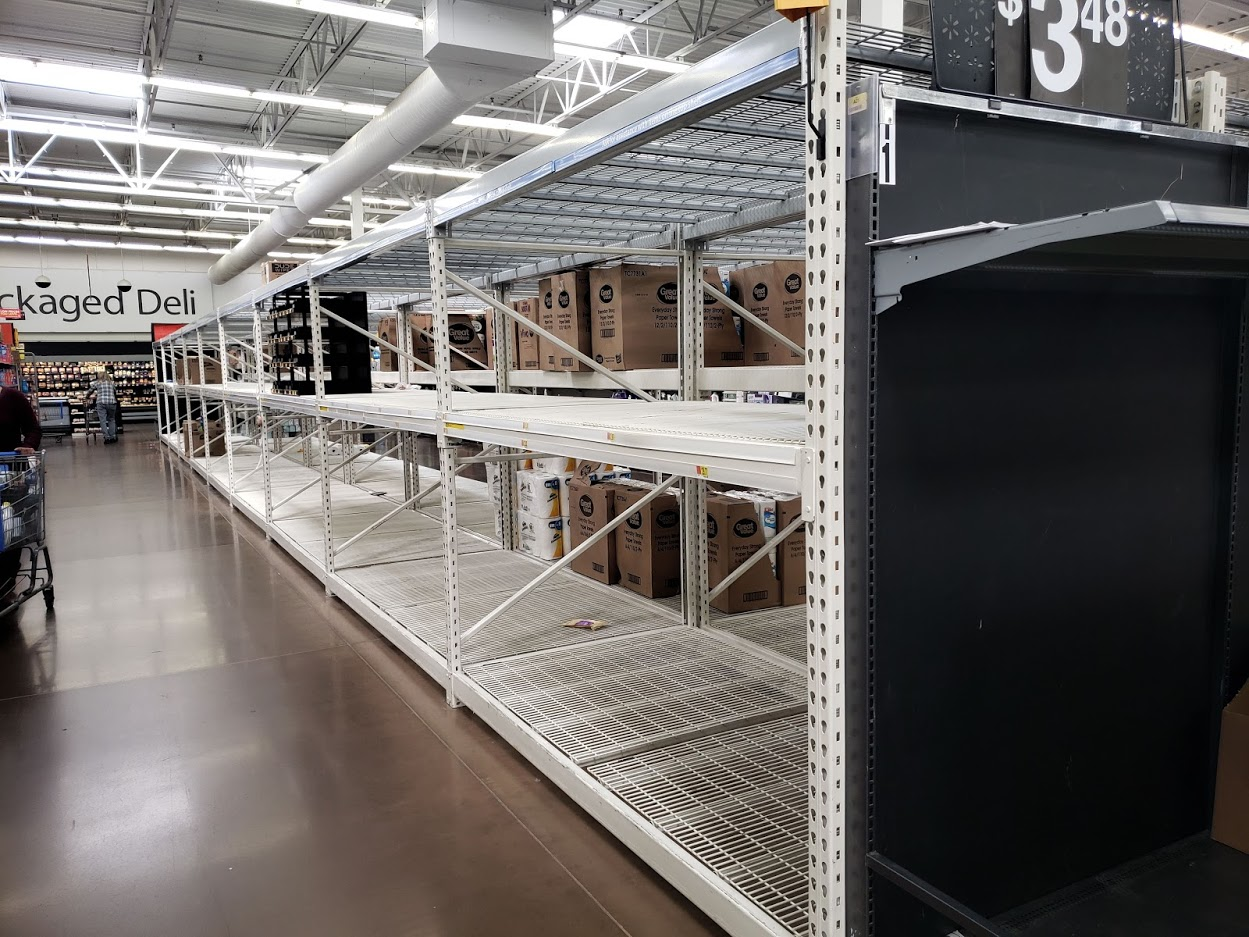
Empty toilet paper shelves during the COVID-19 pandemic at the Walmart in Aurora

On March 19, Colorado reported two more COVID-19-related deaths, one of which was a man related to Colorado's first death. Governor Jared Polis extended the closure of bars, restaurants, theaters, gymnasiums and casinos until April 30 and suspended all nonessential medical procedures. The governor also ordered the closure of "nonessential" businesses until April 30, which include nail salons, spas, and tattoo parlors.

On March 21, Rocky Mountain National Park closed after the mayor of Estes Park cited concerns about the novel coronavirus.

On March 23, Aytu BioScience, a pharmaceutical company in Colorado, announced that it developed a blood test that will deliver results in two to ten minutes at the point of care for antibodies for the COVID-19 virus. The FDA has now approved the test for distribution. Denver Mayor Hancock announced a "stay at home" order for Denver county. This was to go into effect on Tuesday March 24 at 5pm.

On March 24, thirteen Colorado counties and multiple cities had announced some form of the stay-at-home order, including Adams County, Arapahoe County, Archuleta County, Boulder County, Broomfield County, Denver County, Douglas County, Eagle County, Grand County, Jefferson County, La Plata County, Pitkin County, and San Miguel County.

On March 25, Governor Jared Polis put the state of Colorado in complete lock-down, with a stay-at-home order. This started on Thursday March 26 at 6:00 a.m., and was scheduled to last through April 11. Mesa Verde National Park Closed.

On March 26 Mike Willis, Colorado's director of emergency management, had a new coronavirus testing program, after receiving 5,000 test kits and expecting another 2,500. New locations will be set up to test the first responders and health workers. Colorado Parks and Wildlife will be closing all facilities, including camping at Colorado's state parks and State Wildlife Areas until further notice.

On March 27 Governor Jared Polis said that he is working to add 5,000 ICU beds to Colorado's capacity by the end of the summer and is in conversations to bring more ventilators to the state to treat sick COVID-19 patients. The 8pm Denver Howl is started by folks in a neighborhood near the now closed Denver Botanic Gardens and Denver Zoo.

On March 28, Governor Jared Polis announced that the White House had approved his request to declare a major disaster for Colorado. The status means the state is eligible to receive additional federal resources and funding to help address the pandemic. The New York Post named Gunnison County, at 454.20 per 100,000 people and Eagle County at 331.74 per 100,000 as being two of the top four counties leading the nation in confirmed cases outside of New York and Louisiana. The other two counties are Blaine County, Idaho and Summit County, Utah. They state that this will no doubt overwhelm local hospitals. Andy Larson of the Salt Lake Tribune did some math based on factual reporting, and put Gunnison County, Colorado third in the country for cases per capita. He listed Eagle County as eighth.

On March 29, CDOT, Colorado Department of Transportation, suspended the Bustang and Outrider through at least April 11.

On March 31, Gunnison County announced they will begin working with a company called Biobot Analytics, to test fecal samples from the sewer system, to track coronavirus. The county will collect samples and send them back to Biobot which can produce results in about three days. The tests will help measure the scope of the outbreak in the county and track the impact of interventions, such as social distancing. It could also act as an early warning system for a re-emergence of cases. Colorado Doctors are turning to telemedicine, to keep people out of the hospitals or ERs where their chance at the infection of COVID-19 is higher. Many Health insurance companies will pay the Doctors the same rate for a virtual visit as in-person. Previously, insurance companies only paid about half as much. Also, Medicare may waive co-payments on these visits, making a virtual visit an affordable way to maintain the spread of infection. The demand for guns in Colorado continues to rise amid the COVID-19 pandemic. Despite the CBI strongly encouraging firearm dealers to hold firearms until the background checks are completed, gun shops are considered essential businesses under the state's stay-at-home order and are classified as "critical retail," along with grocery stores, gas stations, marijuana dispensaries, liquor stores, and several other businesses. Mike Wills, director of the state's Office of Emergency Management, said that Budweiser Events Center could serve as a temporary hospital as Colorado prepares for the coronavirus surge.

At the end of March, the United States Air Force Academy in Colorado Springs eased some of its social distancing measures for its on-campus cadets, after two seniors committed suicide there in the prior week. Earlier strict efforts to isolate and separate cadets had provoked complaints.

=== April 2020 ===
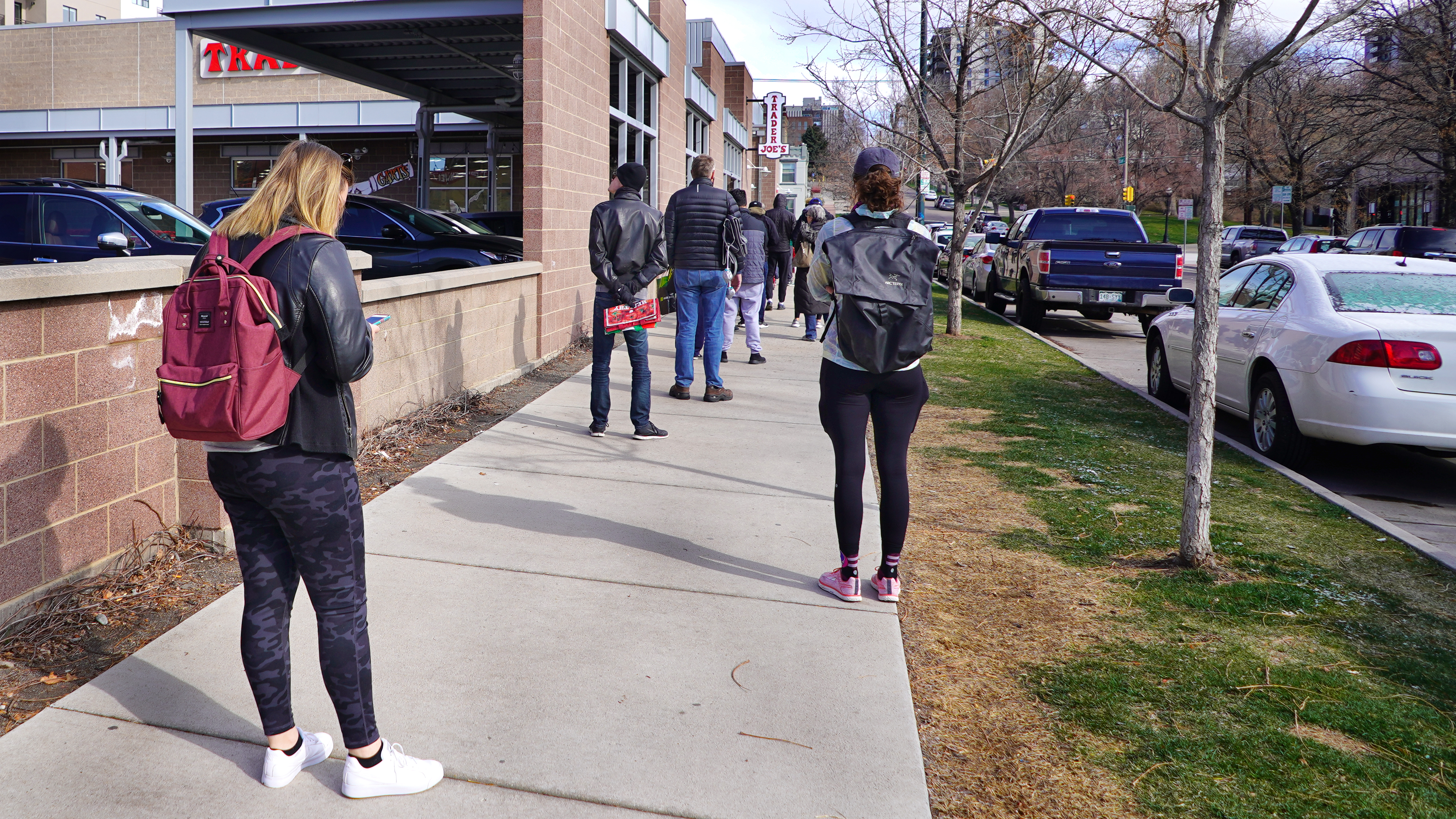
Line for a supermarket in Denver

On April 1, Guidelines for patient prioritizing are made, with 3,342 cases, and 620 people hospitalized with COVID-19, Doctors could be forced to decide which patients to treat. About the new guideline, Dr. Matthew Wynia, director of the Center for Bioethics and Humanities at the CU Anschutz Medical Campus said, "This is statewide guidance on how to do triage in the most ethically defensible way," Projections that Colorado will hit its peak of COVID-19 cases on April 17, at which time there could be a shortage of nearly 2,000 hospital beds and nearly 500 intensive care unit beds even with the present preventive measures being taken, there are new efforts that could close that gap.

On April 3, Governor Jared Polis asked Coloradans to wear non-medical, cloth face masks when going out.

On April 5, Colorado officials set guidelines for deciding who gets care in case of coronavirus surge. Based on a four-tier system, the comprehensive 22-page document will prevent health care workers from making decisions about care based on gender, sexual orientation, race, religion, and other non-health related factors. The document states that decisions should not be made based on a person's status or position. Colorado sees significant declines in air pollution due to a decline in driving during coronavirus outbreak.

On April 6, Colorado's mountain communities are dealing with high altitude issues concerning coronavirus. By moving their patients to lower altitudes, they hope that their patients will need less supplemental oxygen. Dr. Jason Hogan, an emergency medicine physician at Gunnison Valley Health, has started transporting patients from Gunnison, at an altitude of 7,700 feet, to Montrose at 5,800 feet, and Grand Junction at 4,500 feet, to help with the significant amount of oxygen they need. Vail Health Hospital's chief medical officer, Dr. Barry Hammaker, said they are transporting patients to Denver and Grand Junction. Due to the high skier/tourist population, Colorado mountain communities became hotspots for the new coronavirus early on in the pandemic, resulting in the closure of ski resorts and requests for tourists to return home. Governor Jared Polis in a special address extends the stay-at-home order to April 26, 2020. "If there is any way to safely end it sooner, then we will," Polis added. "And likewise if Coloradans aren't staying at home and the numbers of the dead and dying continue to increase, then it could go longer."

On April 7, tourists and second homeowners could face 18 months in jail or a fine of up to five thousand dollars if they visit Gunnison County in Colorado during the pandemic. Officials initiated the public health order stating non-residents and tourists must stay out to help slow the spread of the virus. In the statement, the public health director said people from lower altitudes were at greater risk for COVID-19 complications than people who live in the high-altitude.

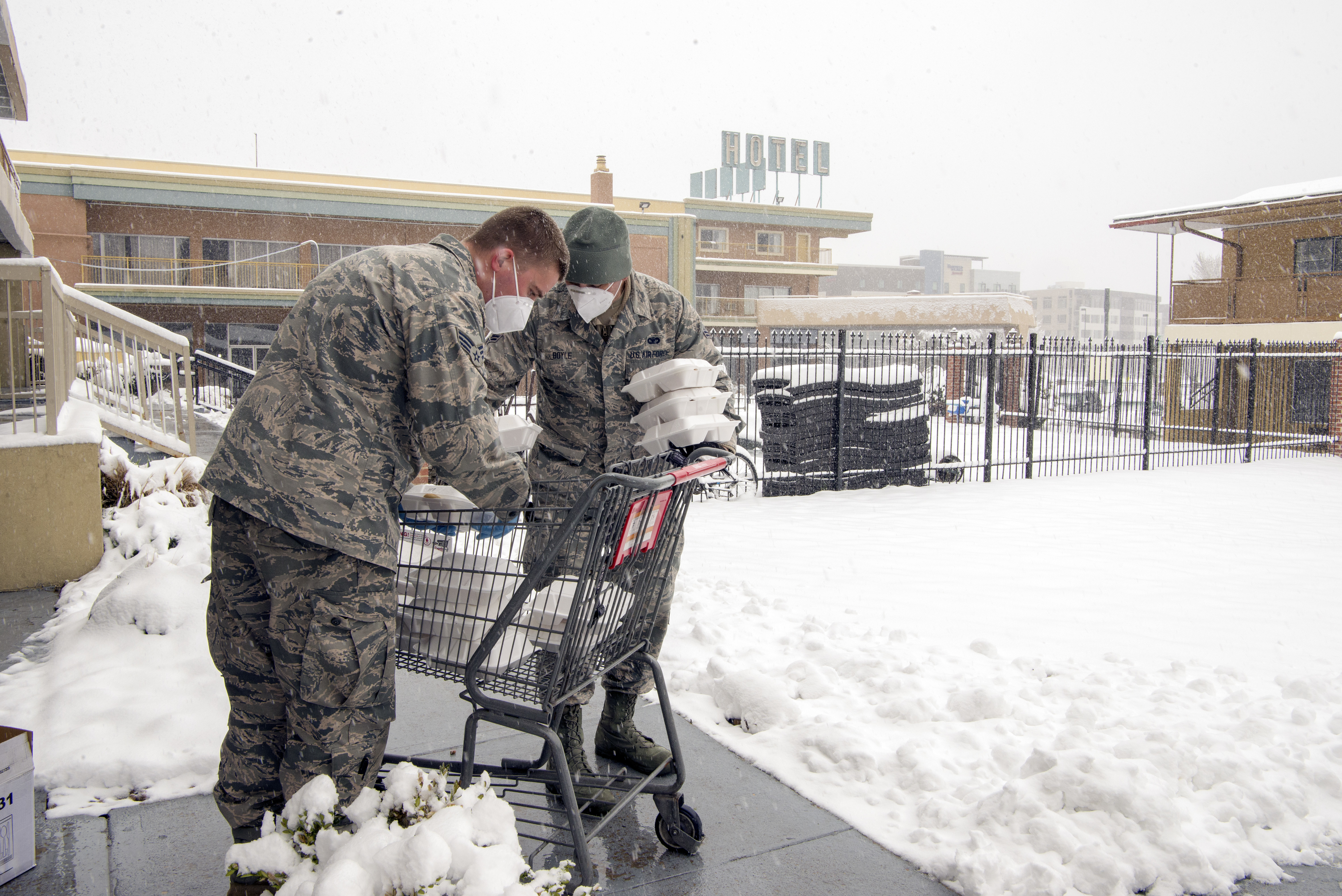
Members of the Colorado Air National Guard delivering meals to people staying in a motel in Denver.

On April 9, the Texas attorney general's office wrote a letter to the director of Gunnison county's Department of Health and Human Services, saying that the Colorado county's call for all non-residents to leave the county is unconstitutional. The letter said, "While the order contains other laudable measures aimed at protecting public health, its patent discrimination against non-resident homeowners – including Texans who own homes in Gunnison County – runs afoul of the United States Constitution." Senator Kerry Donovan, said it's better for people to stay home, where they have a support system in place. The National Western Complex becomes a shelter for homeless men during the COVID-19 pandemic.

On April 10, Attorney General Phil Weiser supports Gunnison County public health order as does Governor Polis' stay-at-home executive order, telling non-residents to leave. The "8 p.m. Howl" was reported to have spread in popularity throughout the entire United States. Started two weeks before, the nightly howl received support from Polis and media coverage.

On April 11, at least 50 employees at a meatpacking plant in Greeley, Colorado have contracted Coronavirus, and two have died. Governor Jared Polis, says that JBS USA would be closed until all workers could be tested. Vice President Mike Pence said that supplies to do so were on their way. "And I want to encourage people in Colorado that we will work to support that effort, but I also want to emphasize that all of the people that are working in the food supply, from farmers to meatpackers to distributors to truckers to grocers, continue to have our gratitude," Pence said.

On April 12, concerns were raised nationally regarding the potential for COVID-19 spreading during April 12 Easter celebrations in churches, though many churches had previously announced the transition to online services in light of this danger.

On April 16, it has been confirmed that Denver Broncos linebacker Von Miller tested positive for the coronavirus.

On April 17, Governor Jared Polis said that the National Guard will be testing 3 Colorado nursing homes for coronavirus.

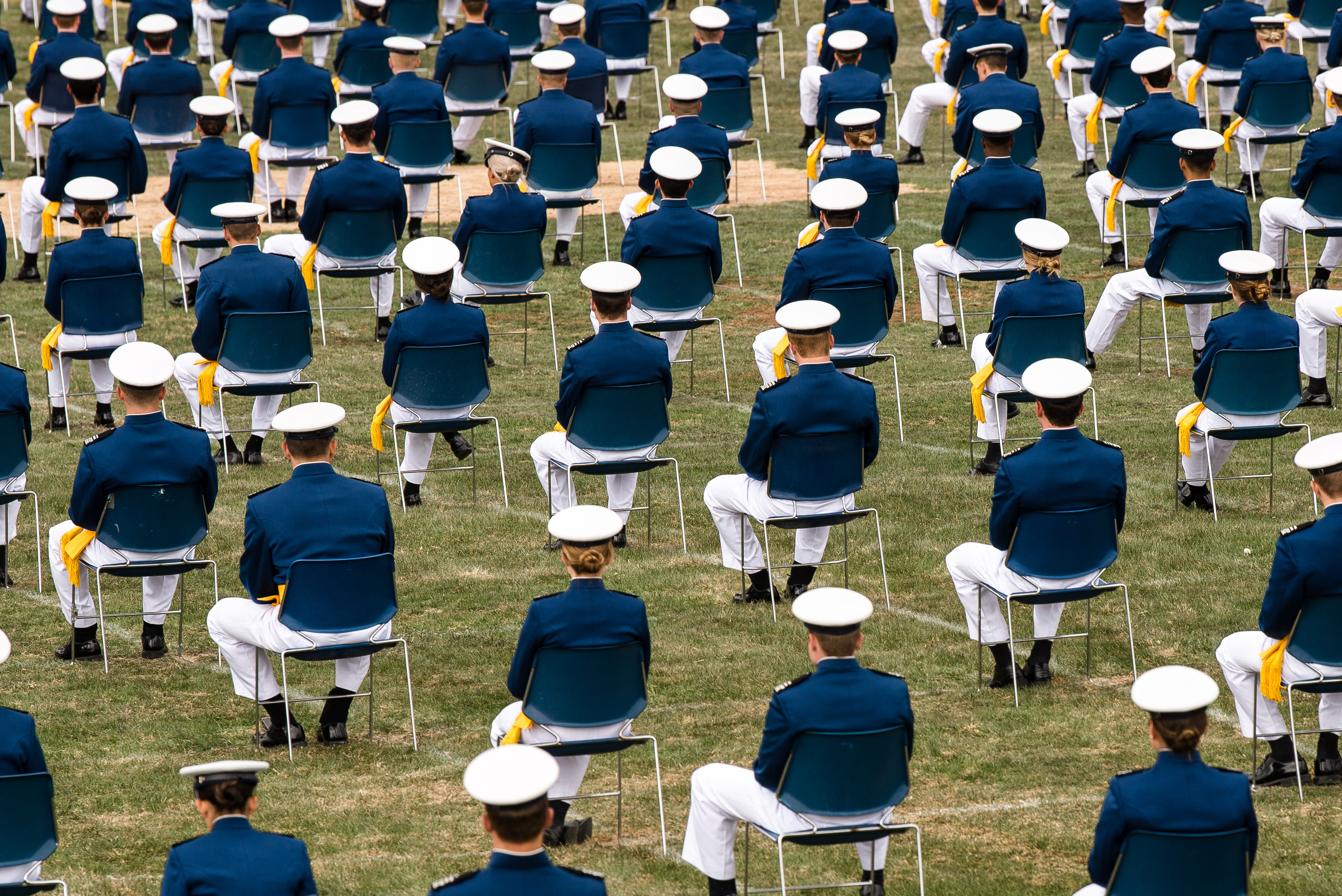
Social distancing at the Air Force Academy graduation ceremony, April 18

On April 18, protests are planned against the stay-at-home order to take place on April 19, at the Colorado State Capitol. To mark the April 18 graduation of cadets from the Air Force Academy in Colorado Springs–including the first cadets to commission into the newly created Space Force–the Air Force Thunderbirds display team released their flight plan for their F-16s to fly along much of the Front Range, from Boulder to Pueblo. The flight is also intended to honor first-responders and essential workers currently helping fight the coronavirus.

On April 19, before Sunday's protest at the Capitol, Governor Polis informed the public through a spokesperson of Coloradan's right to protest, hoping that those protesting were doing so safely. He also expressed his desire to re-open businesses and by lifting some restrictions within a short period. Health care workers counter demonstrate against protestors at Capitol.

On April 20, a 24-hour shelter was opened at The Denver Coliseum for women and the transgender homeless.

On April 21, the "stay-at-home" order became a "safer-at-home" order as Colorado prepared for its first phase of re-opening.

On April 23, there were still not enough tests, however, more were coming. In the meantime, there were strategies being executed to help combat COVID-19 despite lack of access to testing. Also, a possible blood test that would show antibodies began to show promise. Governor Jared Polis, outlined safer-at-home policies and emphasized that unnecessary travel was still not recommended. Also on April 23, Eagle County was the first in the state to be released from the stay-at-home order following a significant decline in cases in the county. The allowance for Eagle County businesses to re-open and for citizens to travel was restricted to only those within the county and prohibited citizens from elsewhere in the state from traveling to Eagle. JBS meatpacking plant in Greeley, reopened April 24, after being closed for 8 days. Testing will take place for any employee showing symptoms. Weld County Health Department will oversee testing at the plant for morning and evening shifts. Many employees feel unsafe and reluctant to return to work, even with a pay raise and bonus, they said it's just not worth the risk.

On April 24, several counties extended their stay-at-home directives, Governor Jared Polis' order will expire on Sunday, April 26 at which time safer at home will be augmented. Weld County will extend one day until April 27. Adams County, Arapahoe County, Boulder County, Denver County, and Jefferson County will extend their directives until May 8. Grand County will extend until May 21. 138 inmates at Sterling Correctional Facility in Sterling tested positive for COVID-19. A Walmart in Aurora shuts down after a security contractor, an employee and her husband die, with COVID-19. Also, six more employees, of this store tested positive for coronavirus, and three more have symptoms and await test results. The store will clean and sanitize before reopening. Ride the Rockies canceled its annual event. Those who have already paid for the event may receive a refund or automatically be entered in next year's event which plans on using the same route. In June The Denver Post sponsored event will have two virtual rides provided via Zoom.

On April 25, the Colorado National Guard and Colorado State Patrol staffed free drive-through testing for residents of Weld County with COVID-19 symptoms. Testing runs from April 24 through April 28 and does not require doctor's orders. During the four days, testing begins at 10 a.m. and continues until 300 samples are taken. The Greeley Stampede, has been canceled, ticket holders will receive a refund or credit towards the 2021 event.

On April 26, the Aurora Walmart, which was closed due to coronavirus deaths and cases, reopened. The store was cleaned and has new guidelines in place.

=== May 2020 ===
On May 1, the Lone Tree city government mandated the wearing of masks when inside retail buildings. The order will be in effect from May 8 through May 26. It has exemptions for children under two years old and persons with breathing difficulties.

On May 15, the Colorado Department of Health began reporting deaths counted two ways. First:

- "the number of deaths among people with COVID-19. This represents the total number of deaths reported among people who have COVID-19, but COVID-19 may not have been the cause of death listed on the death certificate. This information is required by the CDC and is crucial for public health surveillance, as it provides more information about disease transmission and can help identify risk factors among all deaths across populations."

And, Second:

- "The number of deaths among people who died from COVID-19: This represents the total number of people whose death was attributed to COVID-19 as indicated on a death certificate. This number is determined by the CDC and is updated daily for dates through the previous Saturday."

=== June 2020 ===
On June 17, 2020, Kareem Jackson was confirmed to have tested positive for COVID-19.

On June 23, 2020, Nikola Jokić of the Denver Nuggets tested positive for COVID-19 after attending a basketball exhibition game in Serbia's capital of Belgrade.

In conformity to international trends, Boulder, Colorado, where a University of Colorado campus is located, saw a marked increase in COVID-19 infections among 20 to 29 year olds.

During the second half of June the number of new cases doubled from about 130 to about 260. Governor Polis ordered bars that do not serve food, which had been permitted to open on June 19, closed.

On June 30, 2020, two employees at a McDonald's location on North Main Street (U.S. 50) (U.S. 287) in Lamar, Colorado tested positive for COVID-19 which resulting in a temporary shutdown for deep cleaning to take place.

=== July 2020 ===
As the incidence of infections grew in July, Governor Polis issued an executive order on July 16, effective at midnight, requiring the wearing of a facial covering in all interior spaces in Colorado. "Look, in Colorado, there's no shirt, no shoes, no mask, no service," Polis said. "Very simple." Within one month of Polis's mask mandate Colorado's COVID-19 infection rate had been halved.

Polis moved on July 20 to send 70 Colorado National Guard soldiers and airmen to aid the Colorado Department of Human Services and Colorado Department of Corrections with COVID-19 testing of prisoners at the Buena Vista Correctional Facility, Arrowhead Correctional Facility, and Colorado State Penitentiary.

=== August 2020 ===
Sherri Williams of Brazilian-owned, Colorado-based meat packer JBS USA was appointed to National Advisory Committee on Meat and Poultry Inspection in August. Under Williams' leadership, JBS had to close plants in Colorado, Minnesota, Nebraska, Pennsylvania, and Wisconsin, due to the virus, while facilities in Texas and Utah also had problems. At the Greeley, Colorado plant, more than 300 cases and at least eight deaths were reported.

=== September 2020 ===
Cases continued to rise through September, reaching the highest levels since July. Boulder County accounted for around one in every five new cases. The University of Colorado Boulder confirmed 1,198 cases among students and 12 staff members, prompting the University to order only remote learning for at least two weeks. The rise in cases at the University is believed to be driven by informal student interactions and parties. The September spike among college age students was documented by the Boulder County Department of Public Health, which showed a nearly 16-fold increase in new COVID-19 cases among 18-22 year olds but no significant rise among all other age groups in Boulder County.

=== November 2020 ===
In a statement on November 28, Governor Jared Polis and his partner Marlon Reis announced that they had tested positive for COVID-19. Polis had been self-quarantining since the 25th following word that he had been exposed to someone else that had tested positive. At the time of his positive test, the proportion of Colorado residents believed to be contagious with the virus was estimated around 1 in 41. On November 17, 14 counties were moved to the "Level Red - Severe Risk" status on the COVID dial system.

=== December 2020 ===
On December 14, the first shipment of 46,800 doses of the Pfizer COVID-19 vaccine arrived in Colorado. Governor Polis opened the box containing the vaccines and Kevin Londrigan, a respiratory therapist in Loveland, received the first dose in the state. Colorado was scheduled to receive 95,600 doses of the Moderna vaccine the next week. Colorado National Guard Brigadier General Scott Sherman announced that vaccinations in long-term care facilities would begin sometime after Christmas.

A week after the arrival of the Pfizer vaccine, the first shipments of the Moderna vaccine were scheduled by the Colorado Department of Public Health and Environment to arrive in the state. It was announced that residents in long-term care facilities would start receiving the Pfizer vaccine on 28 December.

On December 29, a confirmed case of a new, more contagious SARS-CoV-2 variant from the United Kingdom was reported in Colorado. This was the first such confirmed case in the United States. The patient was a male in his mid-20s who had no travel history. The next day, another man, also a member of the Colorado National Guard stationed at an elderly care facility in Simla in Elbert County, tested positive for the new strain. All residents at the elderly care facility the National Guardsmen were deployed to had already had COVID-19.

Also on December 30, an outbreak at Colorado's first two In-N-Out locations—which opened in Aurora and Colorado Springs in November 20—was confirmed to have resulted in 122 employees testing positive. The outbreak began at the Aurora location on December 6 and at the Colorado Springs location on December 17.

=== March 2021 ===
On March 7, a large gathering on University Hill near CU Boulder coalesced into a riot of about 800 students. The riot has since been described by some as a significant violation of COVID-related regulations at both Boulder and the CU Boulder campus, with concerns that the riot would result in a slower re-opening of the campus and further prohibitions on student gatherings. Several police officers were reported to have been injured by the students.

=== April 2021 ===
April 6, the first COVID-19 P.1 variant cases are reported in Colorado. The two people that tested positive are residents of Boulder county. Public health officials originally identified the P.1 variant among travelers from Brazil and P.1 has been nicknamed the Brazil variant.

=== May 2021 ===
The B.1.617.2 variant, one of several first found in India, is first reported in Colorado on May 6. The five people who tested positive hadn't recently traveled outside Mesa County.

=== 2022 Omicron surge ===
During a surge in infections driven largely by the Omicron variant, Colorado hospitals were overwhelmed, at times to the point when they could not provide what under normal conditions would be consider the minimum of adequate medical care. The state activated crisis standards of care for medical staffing on November 9, 2021, and for emergency medical services on January 7, 2022. Normal standards of care were reinstated on February 17, 2022.

== Government response ==
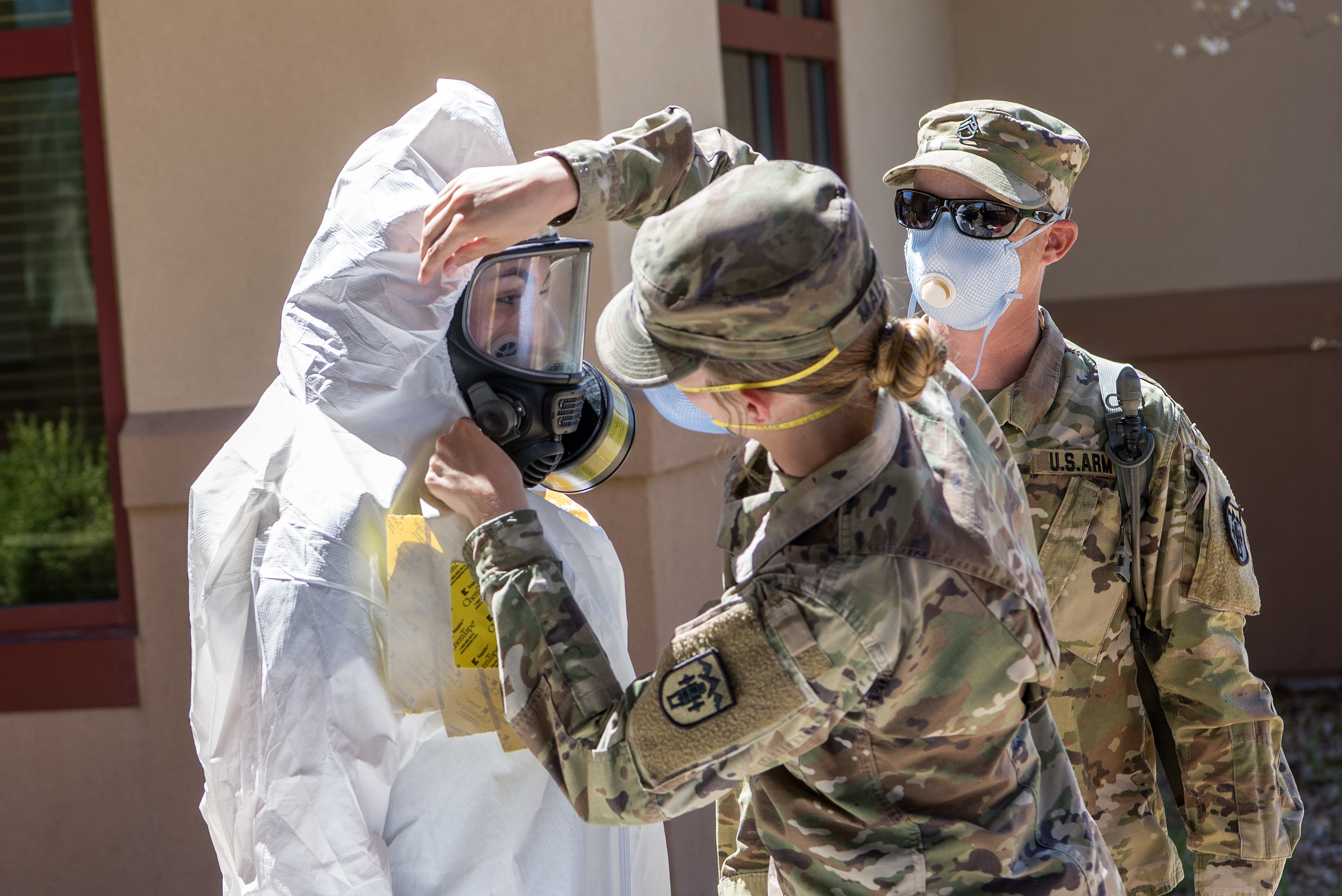
Members of the Colorado National Guard assisted with testing for COVID-19 at a state veterans' home in Aurora, April 29, 2020.

On March 10, Governor Jared Polis declared a state of emergency, ordering the state's Department of Labor and Employment to develop rules for requiring employees in sectors such as foodservice and health care be offered paid sick leave if they display symptoms. The March 14 executive order to close ski areas for a week was the second most significant action by the governor.

On March 22, Governor Jared Polis ordered non-essential businesses to reduce the number of people physically present in the workplace by at least 50 percent via remote work.

Colorado was set to purchase 500 ventilators before the Federal Emergency Management Agency swooped in and bought them first. U.S. President Donald Trump announced on Twitter that the federal government would be sending 100 ventilators to Colorado at the request of Senator Cory Gardner. The incident caused Governor Polis to make future supply purchases in secret.

=== Self-quarantine of government officials ===
On March 17, both Senator Cory Gardner and Representative Jason Crow elected to self-quarantine for 14 days, until March 25. Both Gardner and Crow interacted with a Coloradan who tested positive for COVID-19 on March 11. The legislators represented two of 14 members of the U.S. Congress who decided to self-quarantine.

On March 19, Colorado State Rep. Dafna Michaelson Jenet reported testing positive for coronavirus. Michaelson Jenet was the first member of the Colorado General Assembly to report testing positive for coronavirus and elected to self-quarantine in her home. Michaelson Jenet was at the Colorado Capitol on March 14, the day it closed due to the virus.

=== Vaccine distribution ===
The COVID-19 vaccine has been referred to as "the most valuable asset on earth"; Interpol called it "liquid gold" and warned of an "onslaught of all types of criminal activity". Vaccine shipments will be escorted by Colorado State Patrol officers from Denver International Airport to the state's eight distribution points; the exact plans are confidential and law enforcement will "maintain a low-key profile".

== Impact on sports ==
Most of the state's sports teams were affected by the pandemic. Several leagues began postponing or suspending their seasons starting March 12. Major League Baseball cancelled the remainder of spring training on that date, and on March 16, they announced that the season will be postponed indefinitely, after the recommendations from the CDC to restrict events of more than 50 people for the next eight weeks, affecting the Colorado Rockies. Also on March 12, the National Basketball Association announced the season would be suspended for 30 days, affecting the Denver Nuggets.

=== Colorado Avalanche ===
The 2019–20 Colorado Avalanche season was suspended for an indefinite amount of time as the National Hockey League suspended the season. After a player on the Ottawa Senators tested positive for coronavirus on March 17, concerns arose about the Avalanche's potential exposure. The Avalanche used the same visitor's locker room at the SAP Center against the San Jose Sharks after the Senators.

=== College sports ===
In college sports, the National Collegiate Athletic Association canceled all winter and spring tournaments, most notably the Division I men's and women's basketball tournaments, affecting colleges and universities statewide. On March 16, the National Junior College Athletic Association also canceled the remainder of the winter seasons as well as the spring seasons.

== Impact on religion ==
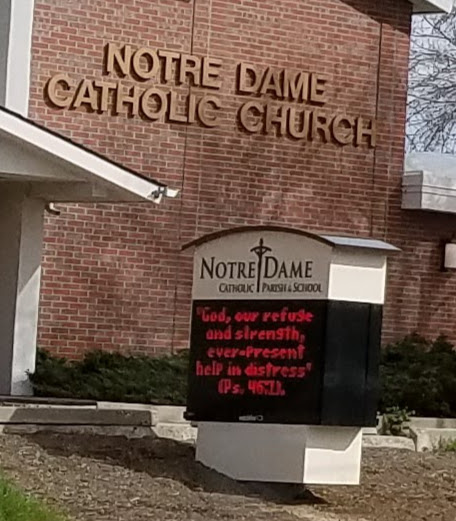
A Catholic church in Denver

=== Christianity ===
On March 12, the Church of Jesus Christ of Latter-day Saints canceled public services worldwide. Other Christian denominations, such as Methodist and evangelical churches, began to close or announce alterations to their schedule around the same date. Highland United Methodist Church in Denver was opened to allow for an assembly line composed of volunteers to produce protective masks in early April. Messiah Baptist Church in Denver received criticism for remaining open. A statement from the church said, "We are NOT canceling any service due to the COVID-19 [sic] virus, snow, hail, wind, locust or any other natural or super natural [sic] event with the exception of the rapture. If Christ comes to call us home, whoever is left behind can do what they want."

The Salvation Army, Catholic Charities, and Fuel Church organized in April to help deal with the increase in the need for meal donations and food assistance in Colorado Springs. The economic impact of the virus left an increase in donation requests across the state.

Restrictions ordered by Governor Polis, in certain localities, restricted capacity of worship services to 25 percent or a maximum of 50 people. High Plains Harvest Church of Ault went to court against the state, arguing that the limitations imposed were "draconian numerical limits" and that places of worship were more regulated by the restrictions than retail shopping. This challenge, as well as one raised by a Catholic priest and a rabbi from New Jersey, both argued that such restrictions were unconstitutionally targeting religion. The United States Supreme Court on December 15, 2020 sided with the churches, sending the cases back to lower courts for review with Colorado's government informing the Supreme Court that it had moved "to remove capacity limits on all houses of worship at all times in response to this Court's recent decisions."

==== Catholic Church ====
The Catholic Archdiocese of Denver began cancelling public services in March, including cancelling Sunday Mass through April 17. Holy Week Masses were moved to live-streams from each parish, as well as Masses featuring Archbishop Samuel J. Aquila. The Rite of Christian Initiation of Adults was moved to the 30 May Pentecost Vigil.

In the Diocese of Pueblo, Bishop Stephen Jay Berg offered dispensation for those who were experiencing flu-like symptoms in early March. On Sunday, March 8, parishes in the diocese stopped filling Holy Water fonts and stopped offering the eucharistic Blood of Christ in the chalice. On March 13, the diocese cancelled all Masses following Governor Polis banning all public gatherings of 250 people or more and closed the schools operated by the diocese. March 13 announcement, made by the Archdiocese of Denver, affected the entire ecclesiastical Province of Denver, including the Diocese of Colorado Springs.

On April 12, the Easter Mass held at Denver's Cathedral Basilica of the Immaculate Conception was broadcast live by KDVR. A spokesperson for the archdiocese described participating in Easter celebrations from home as an act of charity.

On Tuesday, 1 September, Father Daniel Nolan, a Catholic Priestly Fraternity of St. Peter priest at the Fraternity's Littleton parish of Our Lady of Mt. Carmel told parishioners at a catechetical lesson to "disobey your bishop, disobey your governor" and not wear a mask, calling the reporting and response to COVID-19 a "scamdemic" and "attempted communist takeover of the United States." The parish posted the video on YouTube on Tuesday before taking it down Wednesday. The Archdiocese of Denver, in which the parish is located and Archbishop Samuel Aquila governs, and the Fraternity both launched a review of the priest and his statements, which some interpreted as violating Catholic teachings on ecclesiastical and civil authority.

The Archdiocese of Denver maintained its dispensation from the Sunday Mass obligation, publishing guidelines that laity should discern whether they are in significant health danger, interacting with individuals in significant health danger, or were using the dispensation as an excuse to stay home. Due to Colorado's designation of places of worship as "essential," parishes in the state remained open through the renewal of restrictions and stay-at-home orders in the final quarter of 2020.

On Pentecost Sunday, May 23, 2021, the Archdiocese of Denver lifted its canonical dispensation from attendance of Mass on Sundays and Holy Days.

==== Episcopal Church ====
The Episcopal Church in Colorado, the sole Episcopal diocese in the state, released a statement for Bishop Kimberly Lucas on the pandemic on March 13, 2020. The statement announced the cessation of public services on March 22 to last until April 1, with congregations in more heavily affected areas–which the Bishop cited as Denver, Pitkin, and Eagle counties–to immediately stop offering services. Beginning Sunday, March 15, Episcopalian parishes began using live-streaming services to allow congregants to watch from home upon the recommendation of Reverend Canon Carl M. Andrews, the diocese's Disaster Response Director.

Bishop Lucas released a statement on June 3, 2020 announcing that on June 5 the diocese would move to "Season II" and that congregations could begin to regather. Following directives from the Episcopal Church's House of Bishops, Bishop Lucas released a further statement on September 1 that–using the Book of Common Prayer's permissions for special administration of communion and following safety guidelines–reception of the sacrament by the laity would soon resume.

=== Judaism ===
Temple Emanuel in Pueblo had already cancelled its Passover Seder events in April when a suspected arson attack on March 11 destroyed much of the interior of the building. Most other synagogues in Colorado had cancelled their public events and services by March 19. Some Jewish schools, such as Garden Preschool in Lone Tree, began using video communication to interact with students. Temple Emanuel in Denver offered online courses on how to parent and educate students during the pandemic.

=== Islam ===
In late April, celebrations of Ramadan began with alterations. Some in the Colorado Muslim community express concerns that immigrants that were only able to communicate with others at their local mosque would find the "stay-at-home" period particularly trying. The Downtown Denver Islamic Center announced it would provide online courses throughout Ramadan.

== Testing ==
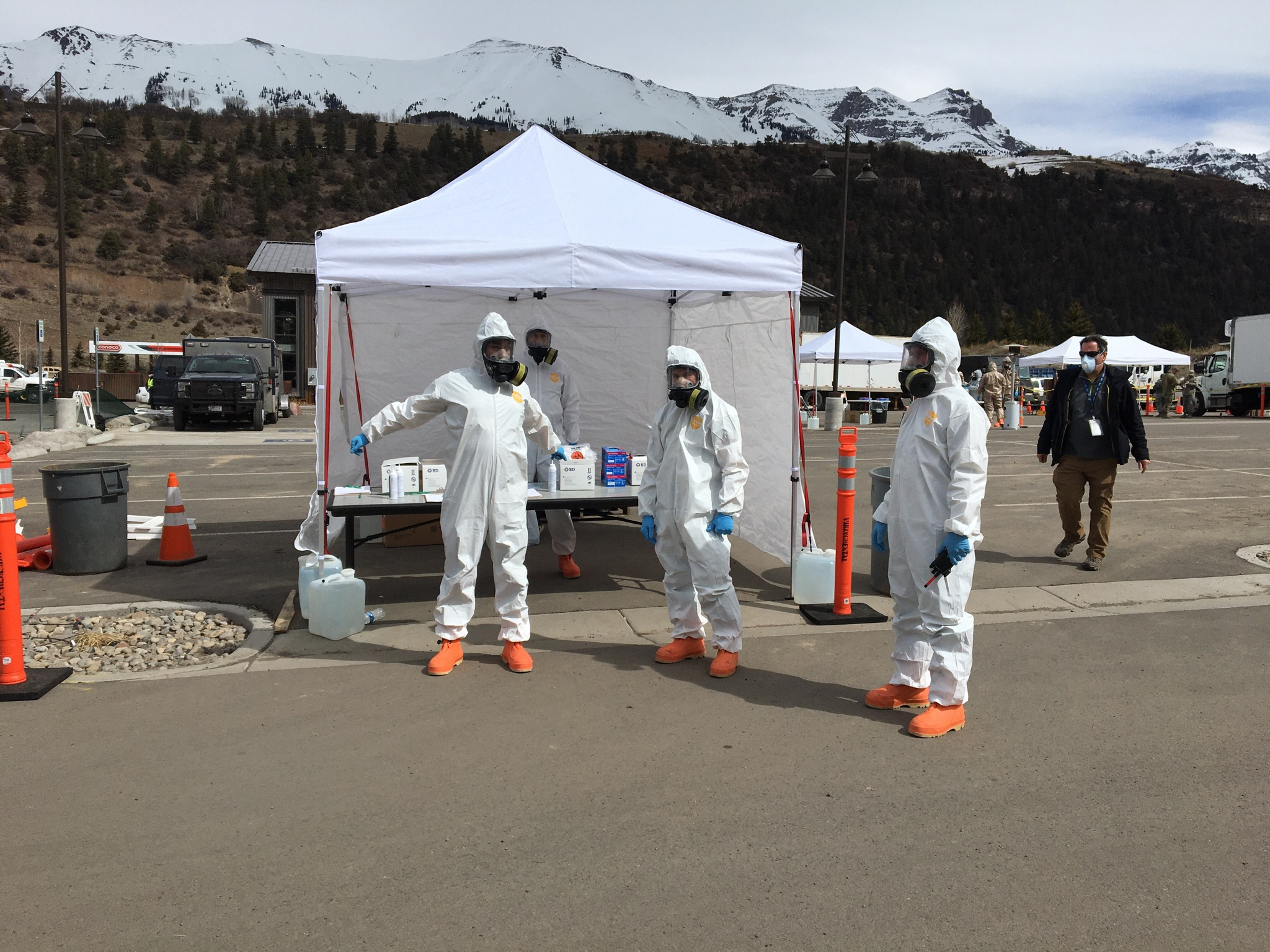
Drive-up testing site in Telluride. March 17, 2020.

Despite the urgency for testing Coloradans for COVID-19, frustrations with the state's limited testing capacity and slow response time continued through the first months of the pandemic. Governor Jared Polis has noted that expanding testing capacity is "absolutely critical", yet limited supplies and a small number of trained medical staff have resulted in a low testing rate. While CDPHE implemented a mobile testing site in Lowry, Denver (later moved to the Denver Colosseum), the site closed due to long lines. By March 18, 2020 no private laboratories were performing tests and only people who exhibited the most severe symptoms were being prioritized for testing. While some tests can be completed in a matter of hours, Colorado's test results have taken up to five days.

== See also ==
- Timeline of the COVID-19 pandemic in the United States
- COVID-19 pandemic in the United States – for impact on the country
- COVID-19 pandemic – for impact on other countries
