= Mariana Matus =

Mexican biologist

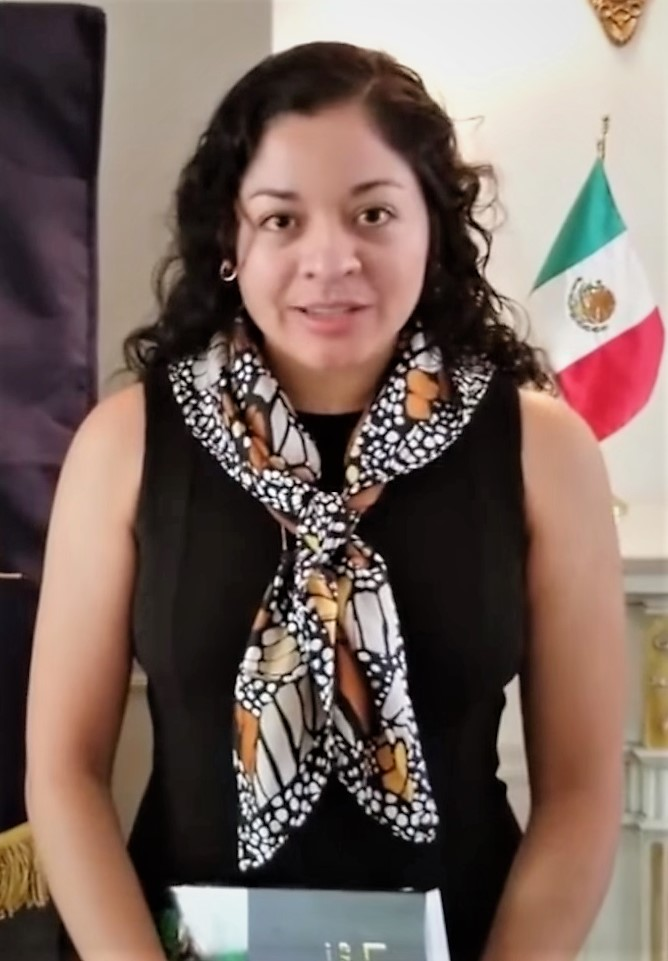
- Born: Mariana Guadalupe Matus Garcia; Mexico City, Mexico
- Citizenship: Mexico, United States
- Education: Massachusetts Institute of Technology, PhD, 2018 Wageningen University, MS, 2012 National Autonomous University of Mexico, BS, 2009
- Known for: CEO of Biobot Analytics
- Children: 2
- Awards: 2022 Time100 NEXT, 2023 Aspen Institute Henry Crown Fellow
- Scientific career
- Fields: Computational Biology, Epidemiology, Microbiology
- Workplaces: Biobot Analytics, CEO and Co-founder
- Thesis: Analysis of fecal biomarkers to impact clinical care and public health (2018)
- Doctoral advisor: Eric Alm

Mariana Matus is a Mexican biologist and the CEO and co-founder of Biobot Analytics, a startup that aims to help governments tackle the opioid crisis and the COVID-19 pandemic by analyzing sewage samples.

== Education and early career ==
Matus was born in Mexico City. She grew up in San Luis Potosí, Mexico. She attended National Autonomous University of Mexico, where she received her Bachelor of Science in genomics in 2009. She then attended Wageningen University and Research in the Netherlands, where she received her Master of Science in biotechnology. She next moved to Cambridge, Massachusetts to attend Massachusetts Institute of Technology, where she received her Doctor of Philosophy in computational biology and systems biology in 2018 under the mentorship of Eric J. Alm.

Her doctoral work centered on exploring the potential of using fecal biomarkers to understand epidemiological trends, which led to a $4 million (USD) grant from the Kuwait Foundation for the Advancement of Sciences and later became the basis for her company Biobot Analytics. She performed a genomics and metabolomics analysis of wastewater sampled in residential sewage and was able to identify thousands of bacteria and metabolites that were the result of human activity over the course of a 24-hour period. In addition to this work, she also collaborated with researchers in Germany to perform a microbiome analysis in mice and humans, which found that the bacteria Lactobacillus murinus can act as a probiotic to reduce the likelihood of hypertension and cardiovascular disease.

== Biobot Analytics ==
Matus co-founded Biobot Analytics in 2017 with urban scientist Newsha Ghaeli. The company is located in Cambridge, Massachusetts. Matus sought to apply her expertise in wastewater epidemiology to detect emerging trends that can be found in sewage. Namely, sewage can contain disease markers like viruses and other pathogens, chemical contaminants, and drugs, which can allow scientists to understand disease trajectories, the spread of chemical hazards, and trends in drug consumption. Matus and Ghaeli have tested their approach in Boston, Kuwait, and Seoul, collaborating with biologist, chemists, engineers, and architects.

Biobot has been working to tackle the opioid epidemic in the United States by pilot testing whether they can use a robot to collect wastewater samples and detect the human metabolite that shows a person has ingested a drug. The technology can be used to identify the kind of opioid, whether it is prescription or illegal, and patterns of usage across neighborhoods by testing wastewater in manholes, which are local to a community.

Biobot was piloted in Cary, North Carolina beginning in 2018 with the support of a $100,000 grant from the Bloomberg Philanthropies's Mayors Challenge. In the three-month-long pilot, 10 small robots were deployed across town into the sewage system to collect waste samples, which will then be measured for their concentration of 16 different opioid-related metabolites. The robots sampled from manholes that collect waste from between 4,000 and 15,000 people and were able to non-invasively identify a distribution of prescription opioids used across town. Since the pilot ended, Biobot continues to monitor the manholes in Cary and has pilot studies set up in seven municipalities across Boston. Matus and her team have since pitched applying Biobot to track the opioid consumption, and other epidemiological trends, to over 800 mayors across the United States.

Biobot is currently analyzing wastewater from 150 treatment plants in 30 U.S. States. For example, the state of Massachusetts is currently working with Biobot to analyze wastewater from the Deer Island Wastewater Treatment Plant of Boston for coronavirus. The goal is to provide a source of data for early warning about new coronavirus outbreaks.

The startup has competed in a number of startup competitions, winning prizes at MIT's DesignX startup accelerator in 2017. In 2018, shortly after their launch, Matus and partner Ghaeli raised $2.5 million in seed funding from Ekistic Ventures, Y Combinator, Refactor Capital, Liquid 2 Ventures and several other investment firms. Biobot's analysis for coronavirus is supported by a grant from the Massachusetts Consortium on Pathogen Readiness.

== Awards and honors ==
- Henry Crown Fellow at the Aspen Institute, 2023
- TIME100 Industry Innovator, 2022
- Boston Globe 50 Tech Power Players, 2022
- Newsweek's 50 Greatest Disruptors, 2021
- Trailblazer, Chemical & Engineering News, 2020
