= Biobot Analytics =

American biotechnology company

- Industry: Biotechnology
- Founded: 2017; 9 years ago
- Founders: Mariana Matus; Newsha Ghaeli
- Headquarters: Cambridge, Massachusetts
- Products: Wastewater analysis
- Website: biobot.io

Biobot Analytics is an American biotechnology company that specializes in wastewater-based epidemiology headquartered in Cambridge, Massachusetts. The company analyzes wastewater samples to measure the concentration of various substances, including pathogens, illicit drugs, and other public health indicators. Biobot was founded in 2017 at MIT by computational biologist Mariana Matus and architect Newsha Ghaeli.

== History ==
In 2018, Biobot began working with Y Combinator and was awarded their first contract by the city of Cary, North Carolina to analyze the city's wastewater for the presence of opioids. In March 2020, the company initiated a wastewater-based surveillance program for the SARS-CoV-2 virus, the cause of COVID-19 pandemic. By June of that year, the program had expanded to analyze samples from over 400 locations. The US Centers for Disease Control and Prevention (CDC) awarded Biobot a contract to expand their SARS-CoV-2 wastewater testing and reporting services to additional communities in 2021, covering 30% of the US population in total. In 2022, the CDC expanded their contract with Biobot to begin testing for the virus that causes mpox.
