= Matthew K. Wynia =

American physician and bioethicist (born 1964)

Matthew K. Wynia (born January 18, 1964) is an American physician and bioethicist who has been the director of the Center for Bioethics and Humanities at University of Colorado Anschutz since 2015. He also oversees an art gallery and forum there. He previously directed the American Medical Association's Institute on Ethics for 15 years. He also previously served as an assistant professor of medicine at the University of Chicago, as the president of the American Society for Bioethics and Humanities, and as the director of patient and physician engagement at the American Medical Association in Chicago.

== Education ==
Wynia received his B.A. from the Robert D. Clark Honors College at the University of Oregon in 1986, his M.D. from Oregon Health Sciences University in 1990, and his M.P.H. from the Harvard T.H. Chan School of Public Health in 1997.

== Research interests ==
Wynia has researched subjects including clinical trials conducted during emergencies, as well as the frequency with which physicians lie to patients (e.g. reporting that a patient had nonexistent symptoms).

== Honors and awards ==
In 1996, Wynia received the American Federation for Clinical Research's Nellie Westerman Prize for Research in Ethics. In the fall of 2012, he received a chapter award from the American College of Physicians, of which he is a fellow. In June 2023 he received an AMA Foundation Leadership Award for Leadership in Medical Ethics and Professionalism.
