= Gunnison Valley Health =

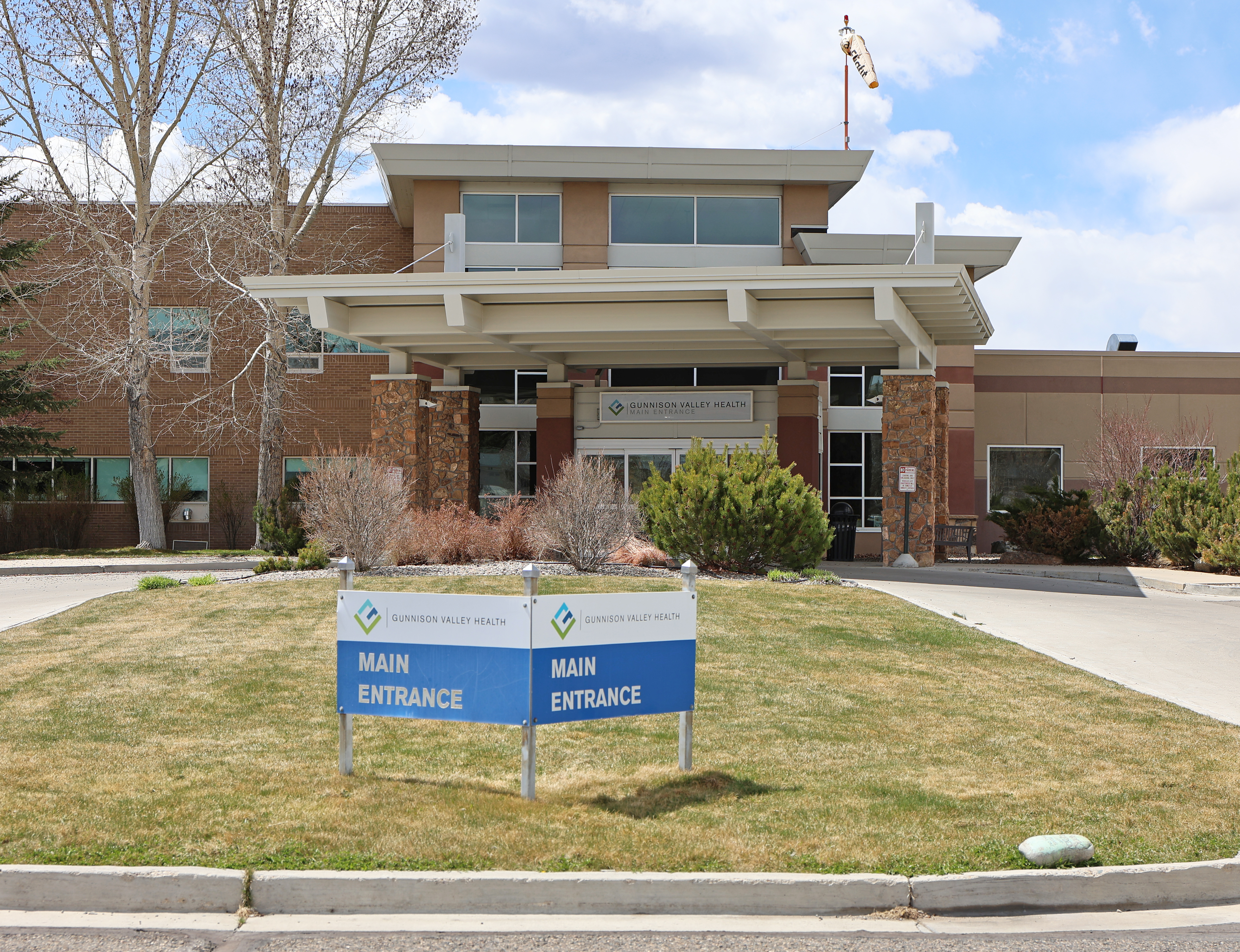
- The hospital's main entrance

- The hospital's location in Colorado.

Geography
- Location: 711 North Taylor Street; Gunnison, Colorado, Gunnison County, Colorado, US
- Coordinates: 38°33′7.92″N 106°55′28.37″W

Organisation
- Care system: County
- Type: Critical access hospital

Services
- Emergency department: IV
- Beds: 24

History
- Founded: 1938

Links
- Website: www.gunnisonvalleyhealth.org

Gunnison Valley Health is a critical access hospital in Gunnison, Colorado, in Gunnison County. The hospital is a level IV trauma center. It has 24 beds.

== History ==
The hospital was first opened in 1938. It is owned and operated by the County of Gunnison. The hospital also operates clinics in Crested Butte, Mount Crested Butte, and Telluride.
