= List of University of Kentucky buildings =

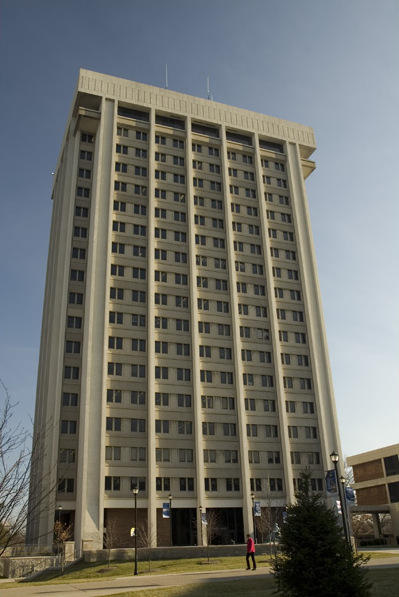
The Patterson Office Tower.

The University of Kentucky (UK) in Lexington, Kentucky is home to many notable structures, including one high-rise.

By floor count and height above ground level, the tallest building is the 18-floor Patterson Office Tower, consisting mostly of faculty and administrative offices. Demolition of the previous tallest buildings, the 23-story Kirwan Tower and Blanding Tower, parts of the former Kirwan-Blanding Residence Hall complex, began in May 2020. Even before the demolition of Blanding and Kirwan Towers, the Patterson Office Tower reached the highest altitude of any campus building because it sits on one of the highest points of the university. All three high-rises were built in the mid-1960s.

== Recent developments ==
Recently constructed is a new parking structure for the Albert B. Chandler Hospital at South Limestone between Conn Terrace Transcript Avenue. The 1,600 space garage will be connected to the lobby of the new patient care facility via a skyway.

In the summer of 2010, Keeneland Hall, the first co-ed dormitory in the state, was named a state historic site by the Kentucky State Historical Society. This designation did not prevent it from being torn down in 2014 to make way for the new Limestone Park dormitory development.

In 2014, plans to replace most of the older north campus residence halls—specifically Boyd, Holmes, Keeneland, and Jewell Halls—with a new residential complex were approved. New residence halls have also been planned for the College of Agriculture campus along University Drive and Nicholasville Road between Cooper Drive and Alumni Drive, the Medical Center campus along Transcript Avenue, near the Johnson Student Recreation Center at Cooper Drive, at Stoll Field next to the current Student Center, within the College Town district north of Euclid Avenue, along Washington Avenue (to be converted into a pedestrian-only facility) and along Scott Street.

Through the first part of the 21st century, substantial housing was needed due to increased freshman enrollment and the deteriorated conditions of surrounding neighborhoods. By 2010, the university planned to achieve 33% undergraduate housing, requiring the construction of an additional 2,500 units. By 2020, due to fast undergraduate growth, the university wanted to raise the undergraduate housing percentage to at least 40%, requiring the construction of at least 2,800 additional units. The ratio of graduate students to graduate units in Cooperstown and Greg Page Apartments would also need to be increased from 11% to 15%. The existing facilities would also need to be replaced. By 2010, 350 new units would need to be constructed, followed by an additional 250 units by 2020.

These projections proved inaccurate—even though the 2013–2019 period saw the completion of over 6,800 residence hall beds (including replacements for demolished and decommissioned halls), the 2019–20 school year saw more than 90% of a school-record freshman class of more than 5,300, plus more than 2,000 upperclassmen, live on campus.

== Future ==
One of the more recent developments on campus was the long-delayed demolition of the Kirwan–Blanding residence hall complex. While approved in 2017, demolition was delayed due to a lack of funding for work required before demolition could start, mainly asbestos removal and the rerouting of utilities located under the complex that served much of the southern half of campus. With funding found for the rerouting, that project began in summer 2019, and demolition began on the complex in May 2020 after rerouting was completed. When UK announced final demolition plans in December 2019, it indicated that most of the 14-acre (5.7 ha) site would be converted to green space, with a new 500-bed residence hall built on part of the property. Longer-term plans also allow for potential construction of two more residence halls on the site. Plans to build the new residence hall were placed on hold due to uncertainties brought on by the COVID-19 pandemic.

The planned residence hall would eventually be approved by the UK board of trustees in December 2023, with construction starting shortly thereafter. The new facility will have over 640 beds.

== Timeline ==
The "Campus" listings refer to those used by the university on its current campus maps (as of 2018–19). These designations have changed over time. Several of the current area designations, including the "Academic Core", were not historically used. Additionally, some buildings have had their area designations changed, such as the now-demolished Kirwan–Blanding residence complex, historically considered part of the south campus but now considered part of the central campus.

Image	Building	Campus	Floors	Year Completed	Status
	Maxwell Place	Academic Core	2.5	1872	Completed
	Hamilton House	North		1880	Demolished in fall 2014.
	Main Building	Academic Core	5	February 15, 1882	Completed
	White Hall	Academic Core		1882	Demolished in 1967.
	Neville Hall	Academic Core		1890	Destroyed by fire in 1961.
	Mechanical Hall	Academic Core		1892	Home to the Engineering Department. Renamed Dicker Hall by the 1930s, and renamed again to Anderson Hall in 1948. Demolished in 1964; replaced by Anderson Tower.
	Gillis Building	Academic Core		1892	Completed
	Miller Hall	Academic Core	3 + B	1898	Completed
	Bolivar Arts Center	West		1899, 1917, 2015	Purchased by UK in 2013; became home of the School of Arts and Visual Studies during summer 2015.
	Alumni Hall (Barker Hall & Buell Armory)	Academic Core	3 + B + Bell Tower	1901, 1937	Completed
	Patterson Hall	North	3 + B	1904, 2016	Completed. Exterior mostly intact, but interior heavily renovated as part of the Limestone Park project.
	Scovell Hall	Academic Core		1905	Completed
	Education Building (Frazee Hall)	Academic Core		1907	Completed
	Matthews Building	Academic Core		1907	Completed
	Mining Laboratory (Engineering Annex)	Academic Core		1907	Completed
	Carnegie Library	Academic Core		1909	Demolished in 1967
	Pence Hall	Academic Core	3 + B	1909	Completed
	Kastle Hall	Academic Core	3 + B	1909, 1926	Completed
	Norwood Hall	Academic Core		1910	Destroyed by fire 1948
	Bradley Hall	Academic Core		1921	Completed
	Alumni Gym Fitness Center	Academic Core		1924, 2018	Completed; originally known as Alumni Gymnasium. Converted to a student fitness center as part of the 2018 Student Center expansion and renamed at that time.
	McLean Stadium	Academic Core		1924	Demolished in 1974.
	Boyd Hall	North	4	1925	Demolished in 2014 for Limestone Park.
	McVey Hall	Academic Core	3 + B	1928	Completed
	Memorial Hall	Academic Core	2	1929	Completed
	Taylor Education Building	West		ca. 1930	Completed
	Kinkead Hall	Academic Core		1930	Completed
	Breckinridge Hall	Academic Core		1930	Completed
	Thomas Poe Cooper Building	UK HealthCare		1930	Completed
	Margaret I. King Library	Academic Core	3	1931	Completed
	Lafferty Hall	Academic Core		1936	Completed
	Student Union (Student Center)	Academic Core		1938, 1963, 2018	Almost completely rebuilt in a project completed in 2018. As part of the project, the 1963 addition was demolished in 2015; the 1938 portion remains intact with interior renovations and is incorporated into the current facility.
	Jewell Hall	North	4	1939	Demolished in 2014 for Limestone Park. Site now occupied by part of the current Holmes Hall.
	Erikson Hall	Academic Core	3 + B	1939	Completed
	Funkhouser Building	Academic Core	7 + B + B1	1942	Completed
	Cooperstown Apartments	Central		1946	Buildings razed in 2012–13 for Woodland Glen.
	Frank D. Peterson Service Building	West		1949	Completed
	Bowman Hall	Academic Core		1949	Completed
	Fine Arts Building	Academic Core		1950	Completed
	Memorial Coliseum	North	3	1950	Completed
	Mineral Industries Building	Academic Core		1951	Completed
	Grehan Journalism Building	Academic Core	2+B	1951	Completed
	Keeneland Hall	North	4 + B	1955	Demolished in 2014 for Limestone Park. Site now occupied by the current Boyd Hall.
	Donovan Hall	Academic Core	5	1955	Demolished in 2014 for the new Jacobs Science Building.
	K-Lair Grill and Food Storage Building	Academic Core	1	1955	K-Lair portion demolished in 2013. Food Storage Building demolished in 2014 for the new Jacobs Science Building.
	Holmes Hall	North	4 + B	1958	Demolished in 2014 for Limestone Park. Site now occupied by most of the current Holmes Hall.
	Kelley Hall	UK HealthCare		1959	Completed
	Blazer Dining	North	4	1960	Completed. Partially converted to a classroom building as part of the Limestone Park development; the pre-existing dining facility was expanded and renovated. Originally named "Blazer Hall," but renamed in 2016 due to name confusion with new Blazer Hall.
	Haggin Hall	Central	4	1960	Demolished in 2013; replaced on-site by New Haggin Hall.
	Slone Research Building	Academic Core		1960	Completed
	Chemistry–Physics Building	Academic Core	4	1962, 2019	Completed
	Albert B. Chandler Hospital	UK HealthCare		1962, 2011	Completed
	Commonwealth Village	South		1963	Completed. Graduate housing complex; decommissioned in fall 2017 and declared as surplus property by the university in December of that year. Sale of the complex planned, with the proceeds to create a fund for new graduate family housing at the Greg Page Apartments site.
	Gatton Business and Economics Building	Academic Core	4	1963, 1992, 2016	Completed. Original building expanded in 1992 and again in 2016. Also served as temporary home to the UK College of Law (along with UK-owned buildings formerly owned by Lexington Theological Seminary) in 2017–19 while its current building (see below) was being renovated.
	Helen G. King Alumni House	Academic Core	2	1963	Completed
	Margaret I. King Library (South)	Academic Core	3	1963	Completed
	Dickey Hall	Academic Core		1964	Completed
	Law Building	Academic Core	2 + B (1965); 3 + B (2019)	1965, 2019	Completed. Briefly closed for a major renovation and reopened for the 2019–20 school year.
	Anderson Tower	Academic Core: Engineering Quadrangle	7 + B	1966	Completed
	Blanding Tower	Central	23	1967	Completed. Decommissioned as housing in fall 2016; demolished in 2020 after original date of 2018 slipped.
	Blanding I, II, III, IV	Central	3	1967	Completed. Decommissioned as housing in fall 2017, demolished in 2020, with work continuing into 2021. The outer shell of Blanding III remained standing into 2021.
	Kirwan–Blanding Commons	Central	2	1967	Completed. Dining hall and student lounge; decommissioned in fall 2015, demolished in 2020.
	Kirwan Tower	Central	23	1967	Completed. Decommissioned as housing in fall 2016; demolished in 2020.
	Kirwan I, II, III, IV	Central	3	1967	Completed. Decommissioned as housing in fall 2017; demolished in 2020.
	Patterson Office Tower	Academic Core	18	1969	Completed
	Cliff Hagan Stadium	Wildcat Sports & Recreation	N/A	1969, 2002	Demolished in 2023 to make way for Jim Green Indoor Track and Field Center
	White Hall Classroom Building	Academic Core	3 + B	1969	Completed
	Sanders–Brown Center on Aging	UK HealthCare	4	1972	Completed
	Kroger Field	Wildcat Sports & Recreation	N/A (two decks)	1973, 2015	Completed. Originally known as Commonwealth Stadium; name changed in 2017 with sponsorship from Kroger.
	Lucille C. Little Fine Arts Library	Academic Core	2 + B	1974	Completed. Originally the north addition of the Margaret I. King Library.
	University of Kentucky Children's Hospital	UK HealthCare			Completed
	Kentucky Clinic	UK HealthCare	5		Completed
	Singletary Center for the Arts	Academic Core		1979	Completed
	Greg Page Apartments	South	25 buildings, 2 floors each	1979	Completed. Greg Page Apartments was named after Greg Page, one of the first two African-American football players at UK. Before playing a varsity game, Page became paralyzed after a blow to the back during a 1967 practice and died from the complications 38 days later.
	Student Center Addition	Academic Core		1982	Demolished in 2015 as part of the Student Center renovation and expansion project.
	Markey Cancer Center	UK HealthCare		1985	Completed
	Boone Faculty Center	Academic Core	1	1986	Completed
	Gluck Equine Research Center	Agriculture		1987	Completed
	E.J. Nutter Training Facility	Wildcat Sports & Recreation		1987	Completed
	Lancaster Aquatic Center	Wildcat Sports & Recreation		1989	Completed
	Charles E. Barnhart Building	Agriculture		1990	Completed
	ASTeCC Building	Academic Core		1994	Completed
	William T. Young Library	Central	6 + B	1998	Completed
	CRMS Building	Academic Core	5 + B		Completed
	Oliver H. Raymond Civil Engineering Building	Academic Core	3 + B	1998	Completed
	James F. Hardymon Building	North		September 2000	Completed
	Ralph G. Anderson Building	Academic Core	3 + B	2002	Completed
	Bernard M. Johnson Student Recreation Center	Wildcat Sports & Recreation		January 2003	Completed. Expansion and renovation of the former Seaton Center.
	Charles T. Wethington Jr. Building	UK HealthCare	6	February 2003	Completed
	Gill Heart Institute	UK HealthCare	5	April 2004	Completed
	Biomedical Biological Science Research Building	UK HealthCare	5	April 2005	Completed
	Dale E. Baldwin Residence Hall	Central	3	August 2005	Completed
	Margaret Ingels Residence Hall	Central	3	August 2005	Completed
	David P. Roselle Residence Hall	North	4 + Maintenance Level	August 2005	Completed. Occupies a property that once housed outdoor basketball courts.
	John T. Smith Residence Hall	Central	3	August 2005	Completed
	Joe Craft Center (basketball practice facility)	North	2	January 2007	Completed
	Student Health Facility	UK HealthCare	4	July 2008	Completed
	Biological Pharmaceutical Complex Building	UK HealthCare	5 + B	2010	Completed
	Davis Marksbury Building	North		2011	Completed
	Wildcat Coal Lodge	North		2012	Completed
	Herman Lee Donovan Hall & Lyman T. Johnson Hall	Central	4	Fall 2013	Completed. Known as Central Hall 1 & 2 during the planning and construction stages.
	Frances Jewell Hall	North		2014	Completed. Originally named Champions Court I.
	Georgia M. Blazer Hall	North		2014	Completed. Originally named Champions Court II.
	Chellgren Hall, Bell Hall, Pigman Hall, Woodland Glen IV, & V	Central		2014–2015	Completed. Chellgren Hall (originally Woodland Glen I) and Bell Hall (originally Woodland Glen II) opened in fall 2014; the remainder opened in fall 2015.
	New Haggin Hall	Central	5	Fall 2014	Completed
	The 90	Central		2015	Completed
	Don & Cathy Jacobs Science Building	Academic Core		2016	Completed. Occupies the sites of the original Donovan Hall and Food Storage Building.
	Sarah Bennett Holmes Hall	North		2016	Completed. Known during planning and construction stages as Limestone Park I; occupies the same site as the original Holmes and Jewell Halls.
	Cloona Belle Matthews Boyd Hall	North		2016	Completed. Known during planning and construction stages as Limestone Park II; occupies the site of the former Keeneland Hall.
	Medical Research Building	UK HealthCare	6		Planning
	Lewis Hall	Central	5	2017	Completed. Serves both as a residence hall and an office facility for UK's Lewis Honors College.
	University Flats	Central	7	2017	Completed
	Kentucky Proud Park	Wildcat Sports & Recreation	N/A	2018	Completed in fall 2018, with the UK baseball team beginning play in the new park in 2019.
	Martin–Gatton Agricultural Sciences Building	South	4	2026	Ground broken in March 2024. Will become the main teaching facility for the College of Agriculture, Food and Environment.
	Michael D. Rankin M.D. Health Education Building	UK HealthCare	8 (south wing); 10 (north wing)	2026	Ground broken in December 2023. Will house programs in the Colleges of Health Sciences, Medicine, Nursing, and Public Health.

== See also ==
- Cityscape of Lexington, Kentucky
