= Robert T. McCowan =

American businessman (1928–2003)

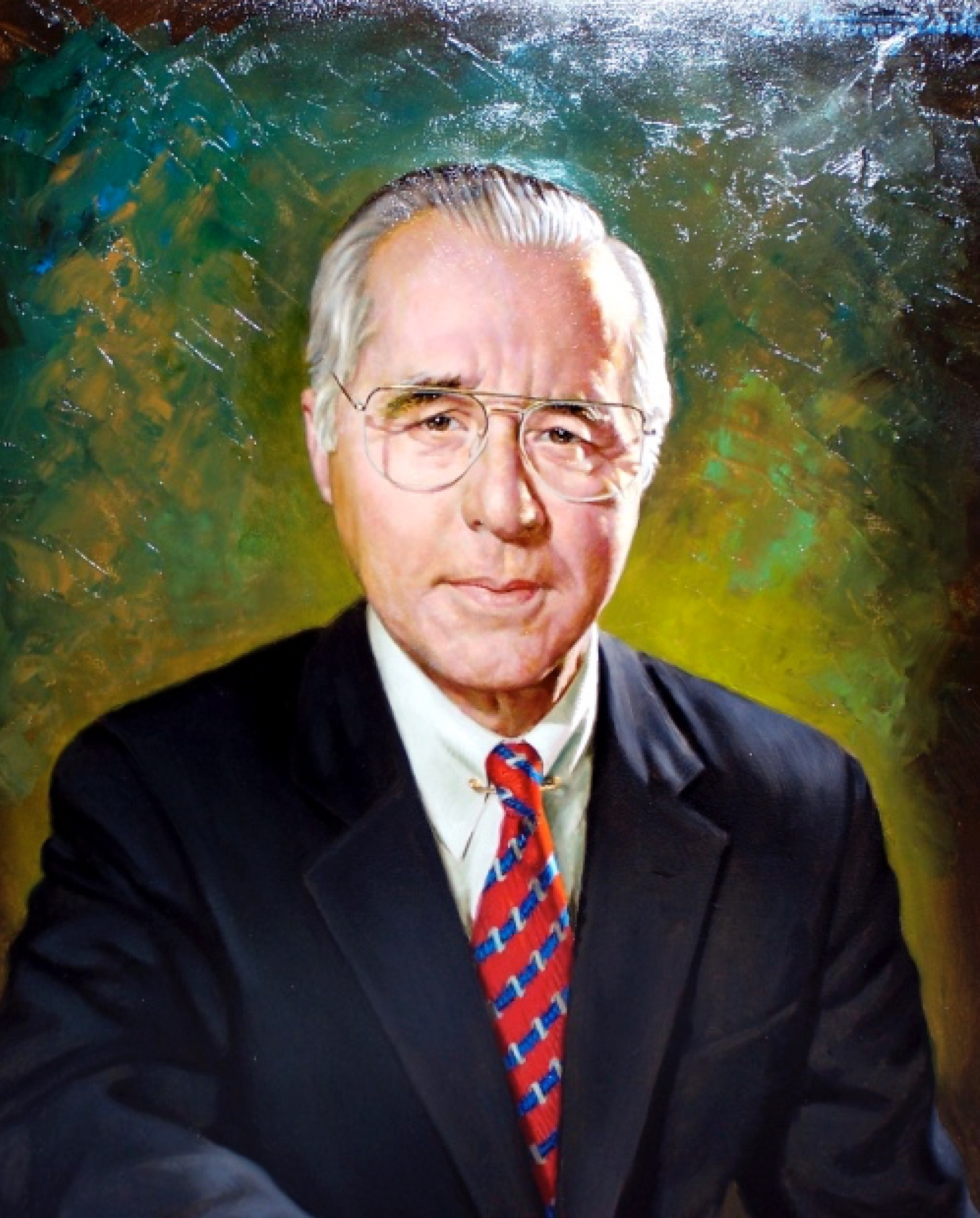
- McCowan in 1982
- Born: July 28, 1928; Carlisle, Kentucky, U.S.
- Died: November 12, 2003 (aged 75); Lexington, Kentucky, U.S.
- Education: University of Kentucky, B.S.
- Occupation: Businessman
- Title: Admin. Vice President of Ashland, Inc. (1968); Sr. Vice President of Ashland, Inc. (1970); Director of Ashland Petroleum (1971); President of Ashland Petroleum (1974); Executive Vice President of Ashland, Inc. (1979); Vice Chairman of Ashland, Inc.(1980-1988)
- Spouse: Nyle Yates
- Children: 2
- Family: William Ray McCowan, Sr.(father); Susan Margaret Taylor (mother); William Ray McCowan, Jr.(brother)

Robert Taylor McCowan (July 28, 1928 – November 12, 2003) was an American businessman, president of Ashland Petroleum (1974), executive vice chairman of Ashland, Inc.(1980), board of trustees member of the University of Kentucky from 1981 to 1988, and subsequent chairman of the board from 1984 to 1989.

== Early life and education ==
McCowan was born in Carlisle, Kentucky, on July 28, 1928. He was the son of William Ray McCowan Sr. and Susan Margaret Taylor, both Kentucky natives. He spent most of his early life in Lexington, Kentucky, where he attended Maxwell Elementary and Morton Junior High schools and graduated from Henry Clay High School in 1946.

He grew up on Rose Street in Lexington just across from University of Kentucky’s old Stoll Field/McLean Stadium and spent much of his youth on UK's campus. His childhood consisted of sneaking into UK's old Alumni Gymnasium to watch the Kentucky Wildcats practice under Coach Adolph Rupp. Those experiences sparked a passion for UK athletics that would span his whole life.

McCowan attended the University of Kentucky between 1946 and 1951, and earned his Bachelor of Business Administration from the UK College of Commerce, now the Gatton College of Business and Economics. As a UK student, he was president of the Student Union Board and was awarded membership in Omicron Delta Kappa – a leadership honorary, Beta Gamma Sigma – a commerce scholastic honorary, and Lamp and Cross – honorary given to seniors displaying outstanding leadership. As an alumnus, he was elected to a seat at the Directors Table of Beta Gamma Sigma.

After graduating from the University of Kentucky, he completed the University of Illinois Executive Development Program in 1964. He worked for Ashland, Inc. from 1951 to 1988 – rising through the ranks to become the company's vice chairman in 1980.

== Career ==
McCowan's association with Ashland began by chance when he was a student at UK and encountered a recruiter named Jim Hiatt, in the university's old commerce building. McCowan, then president of the student union, asked whether there was a problem when he saw his visibly upset. Hiatt came to recruit seniors for a company called Ashland Oil, but no one had set up a table for him or lined up interviewees. McCowan told Hiatt he could interview him right then and there, and so he did and was hired.

McCowan joined Ashland, Inc. in 1951 as a sales representative. In 1954, he went to Chicago as a division sales manager to create a wholesale market for Ashland's petroleum products in the Midwest. In 1959, he returned to Ashland, Kentucky, as a special representative for refinery sales at the company headquarters and was later named assistant manager of the department.

In 1965, he was selected to serve as executive assistant to Rex Blazer, Ashland's chairman of the board. Within a couple of years, McCowan was named vice president and promoted to administrative vice president in 1968. Ashland Petroleum Company was formed as a division of the parent company in 1970, in which McCowan served as director in 1971 and president from 1974 to 1979. In 1971, he was additionally elected to the board of directors at Ashland, Inc.

"He was a driving force in the growth of the former Ashland Petroleum Company, particularly in the marketing arena," said Ashland chairman and chief executive officer James J. O'Brien. "He was instrumental in shaping and advocating Ashland's views on public policy, including energy policy education." During that year, he was later elected executive vice chairman of the board at Ashland, Inc. and continued to serve in that capacity until his retirement in 1988.

As vice chairman, he was responsible for the corporation's public affairs, including federal and state government relations, corporate communications and the Ashland, Inc. Foundation. After his retirement, McCowan continued as director emeritus.

In the latter part of his career, McCowan devoted most of his time to shaping public policy. He was well known in the industry for his keen grasp of political, regulatory, and economic issues and for his ability to build consensus. During his 37-year career with Ashland, he was member and chairman of the National Petroleum Refiners Association (now American Fuel and Petrochemical Manufacturers); a member/director of the American Petroleum Institute; a member of the 25-Year Club of the Petroleum Industry; and a member/director of the Asphalt Institute.

== Personal life ==
His courage in making tough decisions was attributed to the resilience he showed as a teenager when he was left badly disfigured after a horrible burn accident. During High School, he went to a cookout at Herrington Lake with friends, and was involved in a severe burn accident due to a spark from a nearby camp fire when it went into a can of gasoline he was holding. The can exploded in his hands, leaving him terribly burned. McCowan was only 17 years old at the time of the accident and had to go through an extended period of treatment, including multiple surgeries. In spite of the accident, he did not let the experience deter him. "He weathered that like a sailor," Bob Bell, former executive of Ashland Oil and long-time friend, said concerning his resolve. "He got a grip on himself. It was the first indication I had of his courage and spirit and his general positive, upbeat outlook on life ... It was a courageous thing for him to go through. He just didn't let it stop him."

McCowan married Nyle Eleanor Yates, whom he met while working at Ashland, Inc. in the early 50's. They were married for 48 years until her death. They had one son and daughter, and seven grandchildren.

== Appointments ==
In January 1981, Governor John Young Brown Jr. appointed him to the board of trustees of the University of Kentucky until 1989, and in June 1984 he was elected chairman of the board of trustees. He served as chairman from 1984 through 1988, having been re-appointed to the board by Governor Martha Layne Collins. The University of Kentucky awarded him an Honorary Doctor of Laws degree in 1978 and also bestowed its Distinguished Alumnus Award in 1980.

As UK's board chairman, McCowan led the university's effort to hire David Roselle as president following Otis A. Singletary’s retirement. He also chaired the board through the NCAA’s investigation and probation of the UK basketball program in the late 1980s.

"He was a very good leader," Roselle said."He was proud, never arrogant - strong, never a bully. He was everything good and nothing bad."

- Vice chairman of the University Development Council
- Chairman of the Fellows Executive Committee
- Chairman of the board of trustees of Midway College
- Chairman of the Kentucky Center on Public Issues
- Director of Cardinal Hill Hospital and the Kentucky Health Care Access Foundation
- Honorary director of the American Petroleum Institute
- Chairman of the Board of the National Petroleum Refiners Association in 1986
- Trustee of Kentuckians for Better Transportation
- Trustee of the City of Hope

== Memberships ==
- Member of the Dean's Advisory Council at Gatton College of Business and Economics in the 1980s
- Member of the Sanders–Brown Center on Aging at the University of Kentucky
- Member of the American Railroad Foundation
- Member of the First Bank & Trust Company of Ashland
- Member of the (NAM)
- Member of the 25 Year Club of the Petroleum Industry
- Member of the Kentucky Coal Policy Council and the Kentucky Economic Development Corporation

== Philanthropy ==
McCowan never forgot his connections to the University of Kentucky, and as an Ashland, Inc. executive, urged the company to support the university by bestowing the university's first $1 million corporate gift. In 1993, McCowan and his late wife, Nyle, personally donated financially to the UK Sanders–Brown Center on Aging.

== Recognition ==
- Honorary Doctor of Laws degree by the University of Kentucky in 1978
- Distinguished Alumni Award in 1978
- UK Hall of Distinguished Alumni on April 11, 1980
- In 1988, he was named “Business Citizen of the Year” by Beta Gamma Sigma
- Inducted into the Gatton College Alumni Hall of Fame in 1994
