= Wethington =

Wethington is a surname. Notable people with the surname include:

- Charles T. Wethington Jr. (born 1936), the tenth president of the University of Kentucky
- Crawford Wethington (1904–1994), American jazz saxophonist

== See also ==
- Charles T. Wethington Jr. Building, for the University of Kentucky in Lexington, Kentucky
- Ethington
- Withington
