= Anderson Tower (University of Kentucky) =

Building of the University of Kentucky College of Engineering

Coordinates: 38°02′14.50″N 84°30′20″W

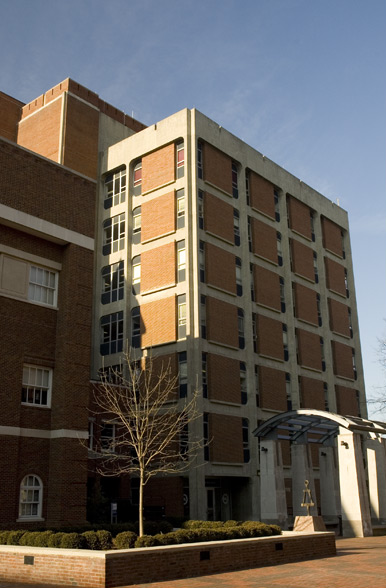
Anderson Tower.

Anderson Tower, more commonly referred to as F-PAT or officially as F. Paul Anderson Tower, is a building at the University of Kentucky. The seven-level structure was completed in 1966 as Anderson Hall which replaced a former structure with the same name. It was named after F. Paul Anderson, the first dean of the College of Engineering. The structure, located in central campus in the engineering quadrangle, is connected to the Raymond Building and the Robotics Building. It is home to numerous classrooms, laboratories and offices related to the college.

== See also ==
- Buildings at the University of Kentucky
- Cityscape of Lexington, Kentucky
- University of Kentucky
