= Lexington Philharmonic Orchestra =

Professional orchestra in Lexington, Kentucky

- Orchestra
- Short name: LexPhil
- Former name: Central Kentucky Philharmonic Society
- Founded: 1961; 65 years ago
- Location: Lexington, Kentucky
- Music director: Mélisse Brunet
- Website: www.lexphil.org

The Lexington Philharmonic Orchestra is an American orchestra based in Lexington, Kentucky. The orchestra performs concerts principally at the Singletary Center for the Arts.

== History ==
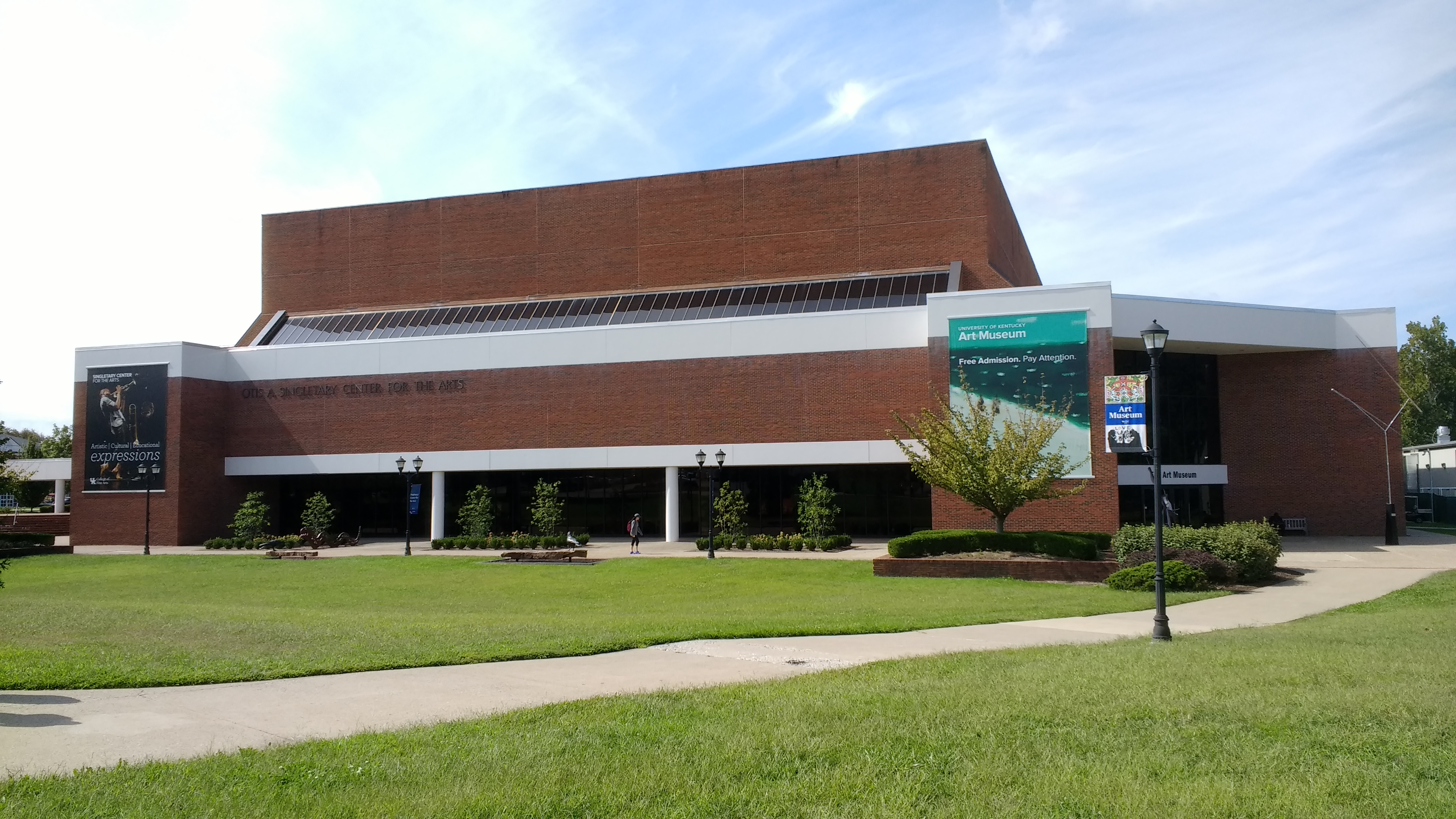
Singletary Center for the Arts

In 1961, the orchestra was formed from the Central Kentucky Philharmonic Society, and incorporated as a non-profit in 1961 under the rubric of the 'Lexington Philharmonic Society'. The orchestra was then a volunteer organization of 65 musicians, led by Robert King as its first music director, from 1961 to 1965. By 1965, the organization was described as the Lexington Philharmonic Orchestra Society, and was a professional orchestra under the music directorship of Leo Scheer, who served from 1965 to 1971. George Zack became music director in 1971 and held the post until 2009, the longest-serving music director in the orchestra's history. From 2009 to 2019, Scott Terrell served as music director. After the conclusion of Terrell's tenure as music director, Kelly Corcoran served as the orchestra's Interim Artistic Advisor from January 2021 through June 2022.

In May 2022, Mélisse Brunet first guest-conducted the orchestra, as an emergency substitute conductor. On the basis of this guest-conducting appearance, in July 2022, the orchestra announced the appointment of Brunet as its next music director, effective with the 2022–2023 season, with an initial contract of 5 years. Brunet is the first female conductor to be named music director of the Lexington Philharmonic Orchestra.

== Music directors ==
- Robert King (1961–1965)
- Leo Scheer (1965–1971)
- George Zack (1971–2009 / died July 12, 2026)
- Scott Terrell (2009–2019)
- Mélisse Brunet (2022–present)
