= University of Kentucky College of Education =

College of Education of University of the Kentucky in Lexington, KY, USA

Coordinates: 38.040774°N 84.508097°W

The University of Kentucky College of Education is an NCATE and Kentucky Education Professional Standards Board accredited, public school of education located on the campus of the University of Kentucky. The College of Education teaches about 3,000 students with approximately 90 faculty members.

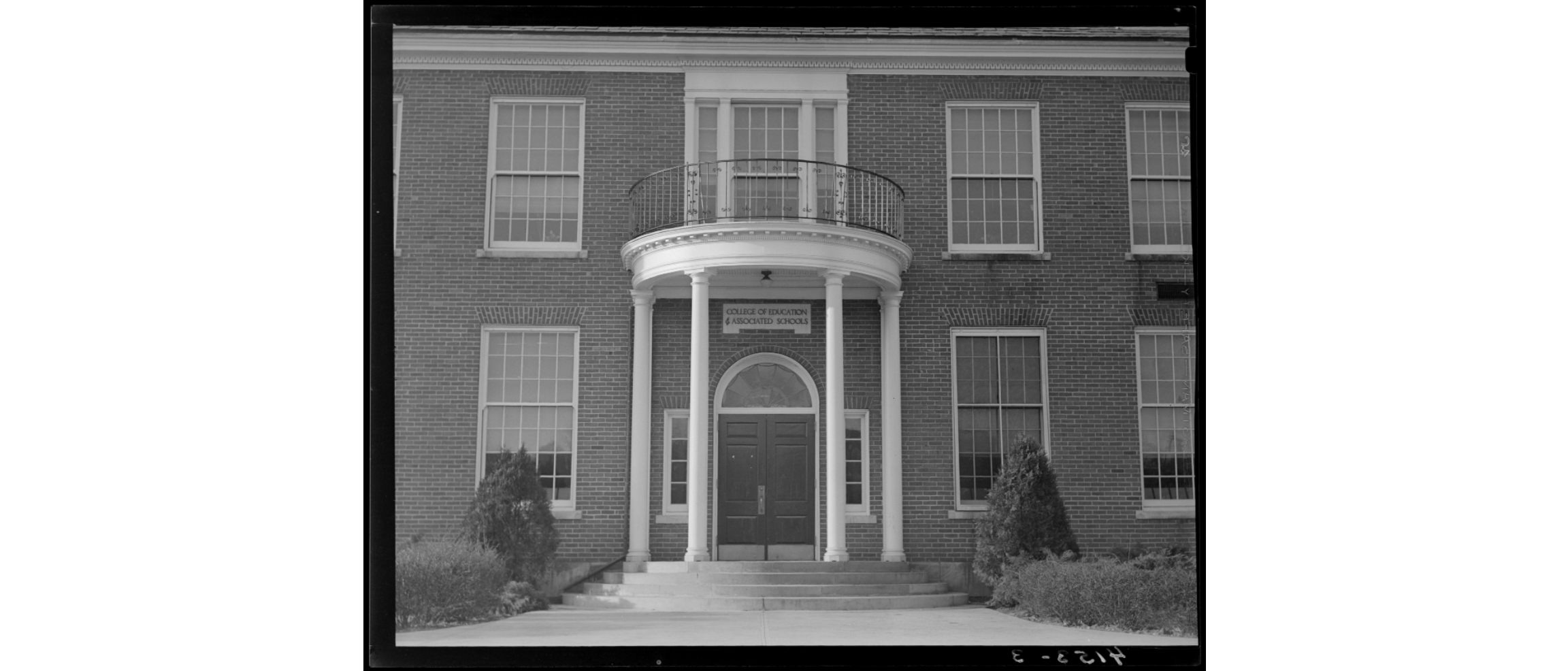
A photograph of the College of Education & Associated Schools building at the University of Kentucky in 1939, photographed by Lafayette Studios.

== Background and History ==
Frank McVey, a man who was president of the University of Kentucky in 1917, established himself in the national network, a network of white and educated men who came from small or rural towns. The national network was made up of men who shared similar educational backgrounds and views of science and religion. These men were doctors from Columbia University and the University of Chicago. McVey would later establish himself in the national network and would play a key role in the development of the College of Education and shift the educational leadership within the state of Kentucky (KEA).

McVey went to Kentucky in an effort to bring national professionalism to the local networking members of the state. However, despite his experience and authority in the networking profession, members of the local network would not recognize his level of authority and experience.

After much conflict between the local network and McVey, an assembly was called to establish the guidelines of education for the state of Kentucky in 1920. This assembly would allow McVey a foothold in the local network due to a survey that was conducted by the national network in promoting their ideals of scientific education.

One of McVey's goals was to establish the College of Education at the University of Kentucky. His second goal was to develop a strong relationship with the Department of Education within the state of Kentucky in order to build the college's funding. As the college received students it was apparent the college would need to influence the public educational system, however, in order to do this McVey would need the local network to cooperate. In 1920, a new legislative assembly would give him the opportunity.

In 1923 the University of Kentucky College of Education was founded. However, the University of Kentucky started as an "Agricultural and Mechanical College" in 1865. Then in 1880 The Kentucky General Assembly established produced a Normal School that established a Normal School for the training of teachers at the Agricultural and Mechanical College of Kentucky. The School offered courses in the theory and practice of teaching and general subject areas which lead to completion of diplomas rather than degrees. This later became the College of Education. In1908 The Kentucky General Assembly established a Department of Education which replaced the Normal School. This new department was located in the College of Arts and Science, now the College of Arts and Sciences and offered teaching certificates and two new degrees. at this time though the university and college were not united, but in 1919 the university joined the School of Education. Faculty in the university became faculty in the UK School of Education. Then in 1923 the college got its name that we have today, College of Education. This was a four-year course of study. The College of Education's first dean was William S. Taylor, who served from May 1923 to his death in 1949. In Taylor's honor, the College of Education Building was renamed to the Taylor Educational Building. This building continues to educate University of Kentucky students to this day.

Dickey Hall is another significant education building on the University of Kentucky campus. This building was constructed in 1965 and dedicated to the former College of Education President Frank G. Dickey. Dickey not only served as a College of Education president in 1953, he also was the fifth University of Kentucky president from 1956 to 1963. He died in August 2009. The College of Education continues to positively grow today. There has been ten deans in total; the tenth and most current is, Julian Vasquez Heilig, being initiated in 2019.

== Notable People ==
- Dorothy Potter and L. B. Shackelford got the first 1 teaching certificates in 1923.
- The first bachelor's degree in education was awarded to Lawrence Schotta Burnham in 1924.
- In 1929 James Anderson Yates, a College of Education student and school administrator, earned the first doctoral degree awarded by the University of Kentucky.

== Past Deans of the College of Education ==
- In 1923, William S. Taylor became the first dean of the College of Education.
- In 1953, Frank G. Dickey became the second dean of the College of Education.
- In 1956, Lyman V. Ginger became the third dean of the College of Education.
- In 1967, George Denemark became the fourth dean of the College of Education.
- In 1982, Edgar L. Sagan became the fifth dean of the College of Education.
- In 1990, J. John Harris III became the sixth dean of the College of Education, and the college's first African-American dean.
- In 1995, Shirley S. Raines became the seventh dean of the College of Education, and the college's first female dean.
- In 2002, James G. Cibulka became the eighth dean of the College of Education.
- In 2009, Mary John O'Hair became the ninth dean of the College of Education.
- In 2019, Julian Vasquez Heiling became the tenth dean of the College of Education.

== Programs Offered ==
The college currently offers programs in Curriculum & Instruction, Early Childhood Education, Special Education, Counselor Education, Educational Leadership Studies, Educational Policy Studies and Evaluation, Educational, School, and Counseling Psychology, Kinesiology and Health Promotion, and STEM Education.

=== Curriculum and Instruction ===
The Curriculum and Instruction program offers 4 undergraduate degrees that include a Bachelor of Arts in Elementary Education, Middle Level Education, Secondary English Education, and Secondary Social Studies Education. There are also 5 graduate programs that offer masters and doctorate degrees within many of the different institution programs. 24 faculty out of the 90 are involved in programs related to Curriculum and Instruction.

=== Kinesiology and Health Promotion ===
The Kinesiology and Health Promotion program is the 3rd largest major at the University of Kentucky. Its undergraduate degree programs include Kinesiology, Health Promotion, Health Promotion (P-12 teaching), and Exercise Science. As a graduate student, there are many specialized programs to get involved in related to this field. Certificates such as Health Coaching, High Performance Coaching, and Sports, Fitness, and Recreation Management are also offered to graduate students. 24 faculty members are a part of the programs related to Kinesiology and Health Promotion.

=== Stem Education ===
Stem Education is one of the smaller programs offered within the college. With 1 undergraduate program and 3 graduate programs, the undergraduate certification program offers students to double major in stem education while also focusing on one specific subject major. These STEM subjects include mathematics, physics, chemistry, earth science, or biology. Graduate programs include Master of Arts in Teaching Secondary STEM Education, Master of Science in STEM Education, and Ph.D. in Education Sciences STEM Education Emphasis. There are 9 faculty as part of the programs within STEM Education.

=== Early Childhood, Special Education, and Counselor Education ===
The 3 undergraduate majors involved with this program are Early Childhood, Special, and Counselor Education. Spread amongst the three majors there are 28 faculty in total. There are also 12 graduate programs that include multiple different masters and specialist's degrees. The program offers non-degree certifications such as the visual impairment certification and moderate and severe disabilities alternative certification. These two certifications allow graduate students to earn further training in specific areas of teaching.

=== Educational, School, and Counseling Psychology. ===
These programs involve 8 research labs, 2 master's degrees, 1 specialist degree, and 4 PhD programs. Programs included in this section are Quantitative and Psychometric methods, Educational Psychology, School Psychology, and Counseling Psychology. With 12 faculty helping in this department its goal is to improve others lives through the educational atmosphere.

== College’s Buildings ==
One of the main College of Education buildings held on campus is Dickey Hall. Dickey Hall opened up in 1964 and was named after Frank Graves Dickey. Frank served as dean of the college from 1950 to 1956 and he also served as the fifth president of the college from 1956 to 1963. Serving as president at age 38 made him the youngest person to every uphold this role. Along with these leadership positions, Frank also taught in the College of Education in specifically secondary education and administration. Frank did not only make a long lasting impact on the College of Education, but he also helped establish the University of Kentucky's Medical Health Center which has improved the colleges overall health care and economic programs. In 1989 Frank was initiated into the College of Education's Alumni Hall of Fame.

The college's administrative offices are located in Dickey Hall, Taylor Education Building, The Seaton Center, Breckinridge Hall, Miller Hall, and Bradley Hall. Although majority of administrative offices are held in buildings on campus, some faculty have offices on South Limestone, Quinton Court, and other spots off of campus.

Also located within the college is the Early Childhood Lab, which offers students working towards degrees in early childhood education to work with children age 6 weeks to 5 years old. The institution offers Infant/Toddler Classes, Young Preschool Class and Preschool Classes. All head teachers at the lab either have or are working on master's degrees in either early childhood education or child development.

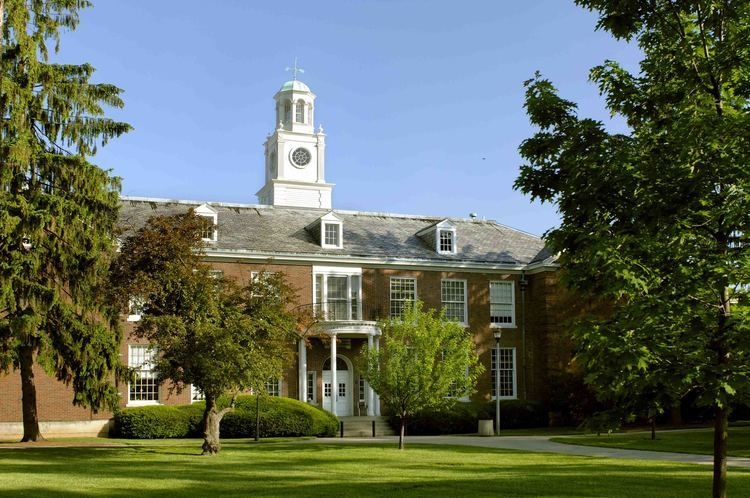
A photograph of the Taylor Education Building, which resides in north campus.

== Scholarships and awards ==
The College of Education offers a variety of financial scholarships and awards for incoming freshman, undergraduate, and graduate students. The college also extends scholarships to students overseas who participate in “Overseas Student Teaching”.
