= Student Health Facility (University of Kentucky) =

Coordinates: 38.032558°N 84.50888°W

The Student Health Facility is a building at the University of Kentucky along South Limestone, adjacent to the Charles T. Wethington Jr. Building. The four-story 73,849 sq. ft. structure, designed by Omni Architects of Lexington, will contain a partial basement and mechanical penthouse

== Service ==
- Preventative care visits can include routine physical exams, and so on.
- Acute care is offered for unexpected illnesses and injuries.
- Flu shots: Offers flu shots each year unless there is a shortage of flu vaccine.Phone Number: 859-323-2778 (To make an appointment)

== See also ==
- Buildings at the University of Kentucky
- Cityscape of Lexington, Kentucky
- University of Kentucky
