= Frank G. Dickey =

American academic administrator (1917–2009)

Frank Graves Dickey

5th President of the University of Kentucky
- In office 1956–1963
- Preceded by: Herman Lee Donovan
- Succeeded by: John W. Oswald

Personal details
- Born: December 1, 1917; Wagoner, Oklahoma
- Died: August 7, 2009 (aged 91); Lexington, Kentucky

Frank Graves Dickey (December 1, 1917 in Wagoner, Oklahoma – August 7, 2009, in Lexington, Kentucky) was the fifth president of the University of Kentucky, from 1956 to 1963.

Dickey graduated summa cum laude with a B.A. degree from Transylvania College in 1939, and received both his Master of Arts degree and a Doctorate of Education from the University of Kentucky in 1942 and 1947, respectively. In 1951 he was inducted into Omicron Delta Kappa at the University of Kentucky. Following service in World War II, Dickey was appointed to the faculty of the University of Kentucky College of Education, where he rose to Dean.

== University of Kentucky presidency ==
In 1956, at the age of 38, Dickey became the youngest person to become the president of the University of Kentucky. His main accomplishment was the establishment of the Chandler Medical Center, including the Albert B. Chandler Hospital, College of Medicine, Dentistry and Nursing. He also oversaw the opening of UK's Patterson School of Diplomacy. In 2002 he was awarded the Laurel Crowned Circle Award, Omicron Delta Kappa's highest honor.

Dickey resigned as president to become director of the Southern Association of Colleges and Schools. He later became provost of the University of North Carolina at Charlotte. He died on August 7, 2009, after a long illness.

== Legacy ==
One of the buildings of the UK College of Education, Dickey Hall, is named for Dr. Dickey.
