= Margaret I. King Library =

Library at the University of Kentucky

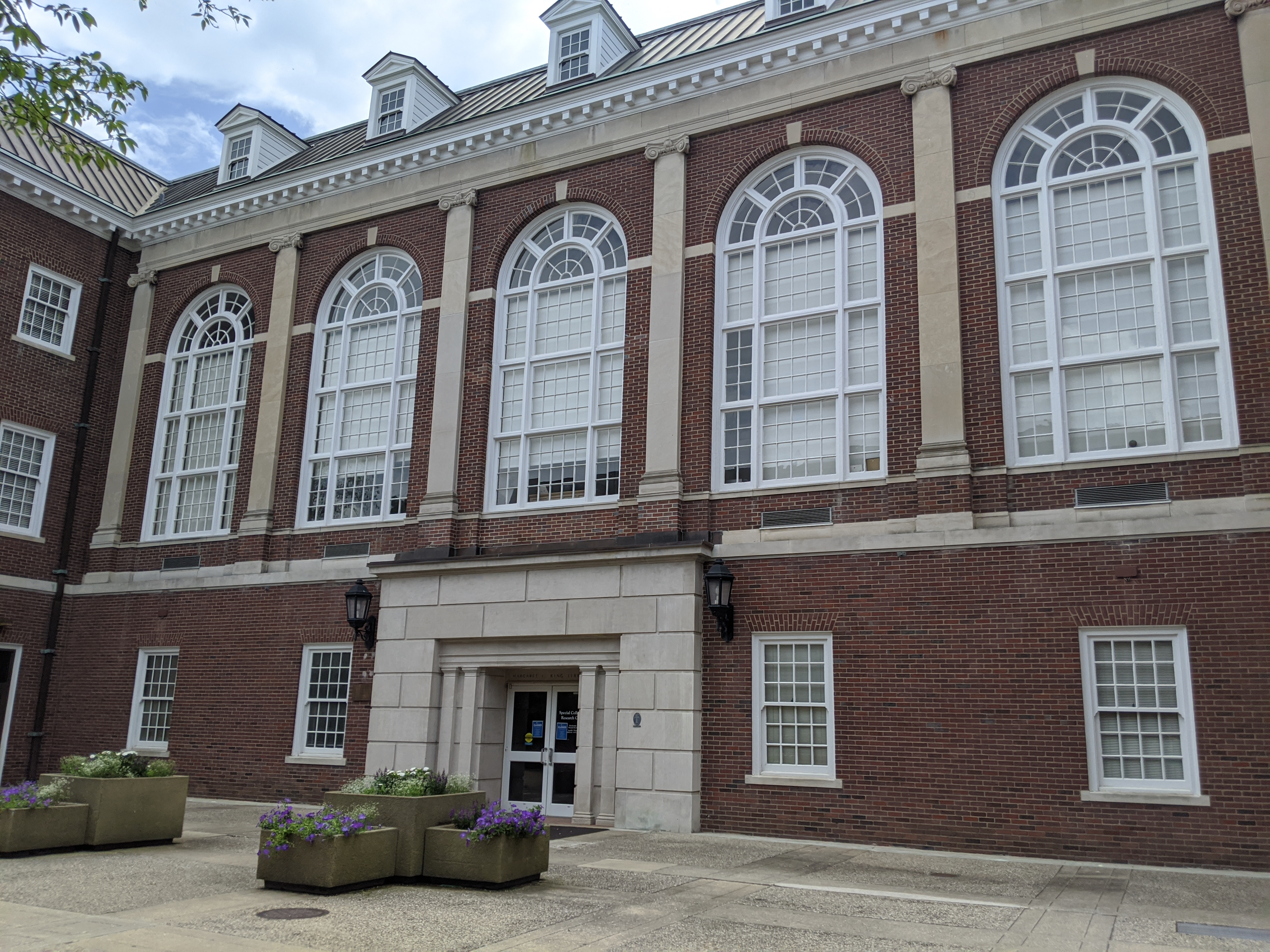
- 38°02′12.65″N 84°30′12.50″W
- Location: 179 Funkhouser Drive, University of Kentucky, Lexington, KY 40506-0456, United States
- Type: Public
- Established: 1931

Other information
- Website: King Library

The Margaret I. King Library consists of three contiguous buildings at the University of Kentucky. A southern and northern addition were added to the original building.

== History ==
The first library at the University of Kentucky was the 7,367 gross sq. ft. (basement, 1st & mezzanine) Carnegie library. Dedicated in November 1909, it was constructed with a $26,000 grant from Andrew Carnegie, it was operated by Margaret I. King, the university's first librarian who was also secretary to the university's first President, James Patterson. It had an annual book budget of $2,000. Before the library's construction, volumes and materials had to be checked out from Patterson's personal collection.

Between 1910 and 1928, the number of volumes in the library grew from 3,000 to 100,000. By 1925, the number of people employed at the library was just six.

In 1929, construction began on the University Library due to the rapid growth and success of the Carnegie Library. Then-University of Kentucky President Frank L. McVey was pushing for the "little college" to transform into a "true university." The completion of the 250,000 volume $450,000 facility in 1931 was funded entirely from existing University funds as the state failed to provide adequate monies towards the construction. The library was designed to be expanded ten years after its opening.

In 1941, the expansion for the library that was once planned was halted by World War II. In 1947, Margaret King retired from her post at the library after four decades. In honor of her service to the public, the university renamed the University Library the Margaret I. King Library.

By the mid-1950s, however, the library was beginning to show its age and was quickly running out of room for the more than 250,000 volumes it was holding. In 1960, then-University of Kentucky President Frank G. Dickey proposed a new library but did not receive any assurance from the state's General Assembly that funding would be appropriated. It also received a flat response from then-Director of Libraries at the university, Lawrence S. Thompson, who was more interested in developing special collections than expanding the facility.

In 1962, a compromise was reached for a $2 million addition to the southern side of the building. It was completed in 1963, however, the floor levels did not match those in the original library. As a result, navigating between the two libraries became a chore and the maze of corridors, stairwells and stacks became known as a maze.

It's the most ungodly addition I've been in. It threw that library into a complete state of confusion. How students ever learned to use it, I don't understand.

— Historian and former faculty member Thomas D. Clark

Record attendance during the late-1960s and early-1970s required the construction of another addition. Constructed in 1974, the Margaret I. King Library North was a $4 million addition to the north of the original facility that housed special collections, periodicals and administrative offices. It included an overhead pedestrian crossing between the original library and the new addition. Construction on this was spearheaded by then-President Otis A. Singletary.

== Today ==
In April 1998, the William T. Young Library opened and by May, most of the functions of the King Library had been relocated.

Today, the King Library is home to Special Collections, the Louie B. Nunn Center for Oral History, the Wendell H. Ford Public Policy Research Center, Digital Library Services, the Science & Engineering Library and Map Collection, the King Library Press, and several library support offices. King North became the Lucille Caudill Little Fine Arts Library and Learning Center. In 1999, the bridge that connected the former King North to the original King Library was removed. One year later, the Little Fine Arts Library was extensively renovated.

== See also ==
- Buildings at the University of Kentucky
- Cityscape of Lexington, Kentucky
- University of Kentucky
