= Robert Schwemm =

American lawyer

Robert G. Schwemm is an American lawyer and currently the Ashland-Spears Distinguished Research Professor of Law and William L. Matthews, Jr. Professor of Law at the College of Law, University of Kentucky, and also a published author. From 1998-99, he was also the college's Acting Dean.
