= John W. Oswald =

American botanist and academic administrator

13th President of the Pennsylvania State University
- In office 1970–1983
- Preceded by: Eric A. Walker
- Succeeded by: Bryce Jordan

6th President of the University of Kentucky
- In office 1963–1968
- Preceded by: Frank G. Dickey
- Succeeded by: Albert D. Kirwan

Personal details
- Born: October 11, 1917 Minneapolis, Minnesota, US
- Died: February 1, 1995 (aged 77) Philadelphia, Pennsylvania, US
- Education: DePauw University; University of California

John Wieland Oswald (October 11, 1917 – February 1, 1995) was president of the University of Kentucky, executive vice president of the University of California, and President of the Pennsylvania State University.

== Biography ==
Born in Minneapolis, Minnesota in 1917, Oswald did his undergraduate work in botany at DePauw University, Greencastle, Indiana and received his Ph.D. from the University of California in 1942. During World War II, Oswald served as a PT boat captain in the Mediterranean.

In 1946, Oswald taught plant pathology as an assistant professor at the Davis Campus of the University of California. He was chairman plant pathology department at the Berkeley Campus in 1954. In 1962 he became vice president for administration in the statewide system for the University of California.

Oswald was president of the University of Kentucky from 1963 to 1968. He was executive vice president of the University of California from 1968 to 1970. In 1970, he became president of Pennsylvania State University until he retired in 1983. He died in Philadelphia, Pennsylvania in 1995.
