= Simon Sheather =

American statistician

Simon J. Sheather is an Australian-American academic. He became the 8th dean of the University of Kentucky’s Gatton College of Business and Economics on July 1st, 2018. A Fellow of the American Statistical Association, Sheather is known for the Sheather-Jones bandwidth selection method for kernel density estimation.

== Early life and education ==
Sheather was born and raised in Australia, the son of a bank clerk and a nurse. Sheather graduated with 1st Class Honours in mathematical statistics from the University of Melbourne and earned his Ph.D. in statistics from La Trobe University.

== Career ==
His academic career includes professorships at the University of New South Wales and Texas A&M University as well as visiting professorships at Pennsylvania State University and the Stern School of Business at New York University. While at Texas A&M, he started two professional master’s programs.

In 2021, Sheather was named as the first holder of the Truist Chair in Data Analytics.

== Selected works ==
- Simon, Sheather (2009), A Modern Approach to Regression with R, Springer
- Sheather, S.J.; Jones, M.C. (1991). "A reliable data-based bandwidth selection method for kernel density estimation". Journal of the Royal Statistical Society, Series B. 53 (3): 683–690. doi:10.1111/j.2517-6161.1991.tb01857.x. JSTOR 2345597.

== Recognition ==
Sheather was named a Fellow of the American Statistical Association in 2001.
