= Albert B. Chandler Hospital =

- UK HealthCare
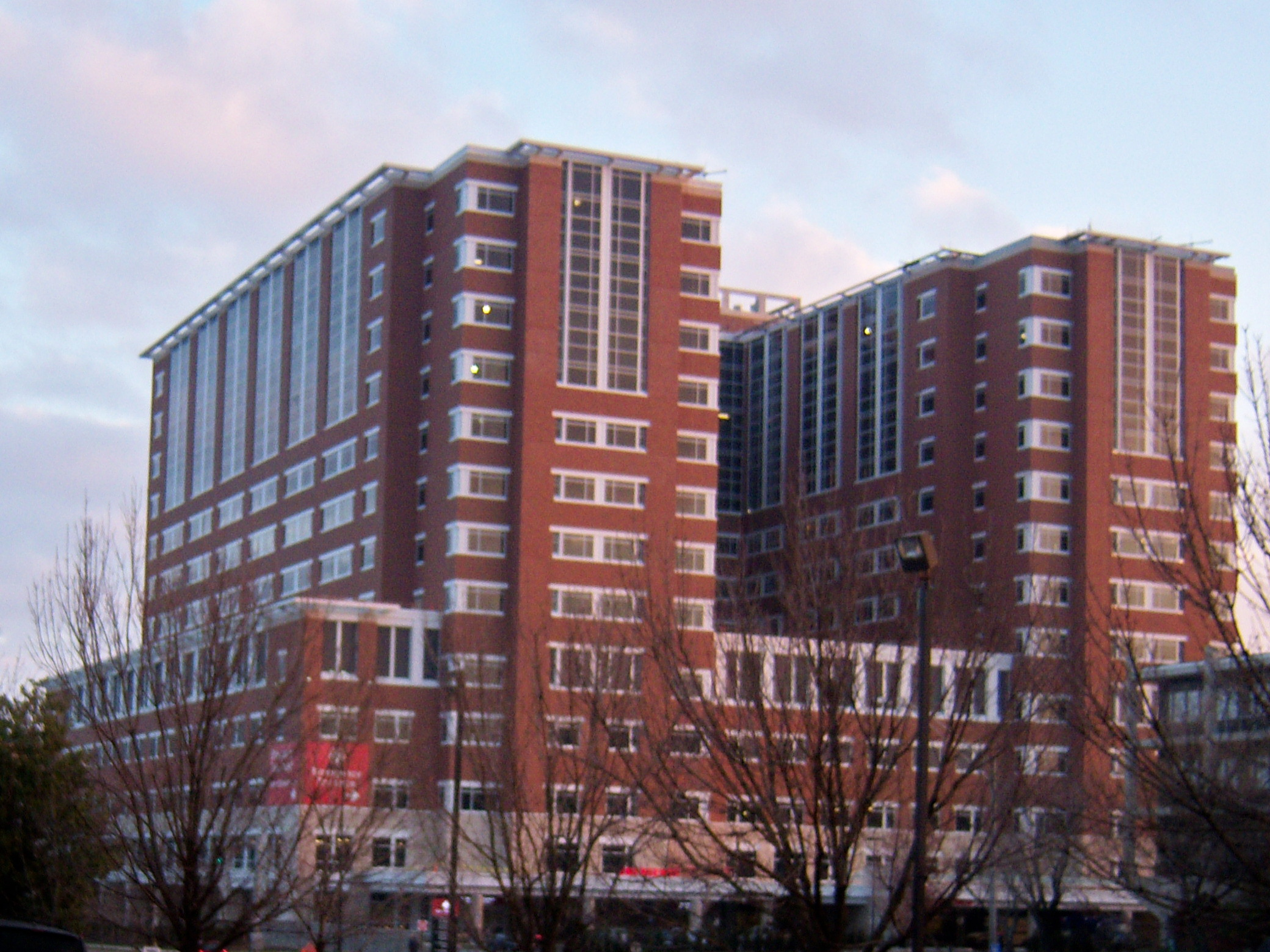
- South facade of Pavilion A

Geography
- Location: 800 Rose Street, Lexington, Kentucky, United States
- Coordinates: 38.0316446°N 84.5084135°W

Organization
- Type: Teaching
- Affiliated university: University of Kentucky College of Medicine

Services
- Emergency department: Level I trauma center
- Beds: 945

History
- Founded: 1962

Links
- Website: Chandler Hospital
- Lists: Hospitals in Kentucky

Opened in 1962, the Albert B. Chandler Hospital along Rose Street at the University of Kentucky in Lexington, Kentucky is the flagship component of UK HealthCare. It is named for twice-former Governor of Kentucky A. B. "Happy" Chandler. The 945 bed medical facility features the Markey Cancer Center, the Kentucky Children's Hospital, the Gill Heart Institute, the Kentucky Neuroscience Institute and the Center for Advanced Surgery.

The hospital is the only Level I trauma center in central and eastern Kentucky, and the only facility in the region to play host to a Level IV neonatal intensive care unit for infants. It also includes a 100-bed intensive care facility and 17 operating rooms.

Ground was broken for the hospital in 1955, when Governor Chandler recommended that the Kentucky General Assembly appropriate $5 million for the creation of the University of Kentucky College of Medicine and a medical center at the university. This was completed after a series of studies were conducted that highlighted the health needs of the citizens, as well as the need to train more physicians for the state.

== Future ==
=== Phase I ===
The University of Kentucky began the add-on construction of the one-million sq. ft. Albert B. Chandler Hospital in May 2008. The $450 million hospital is one of the largest projects in state history in terms of size and impact. Nearby, a parking structure was built for the patient care facility to replace another structure that had to be demolished to increase the hospital's footprint. The first phase of the new hospital opened July 2010.

Design work regarding the new facility began in August 2005. This was due to a need to modernize the hospital due to the "rapidly changing nature of health care delivery" and other advances, along with a sharp increase in patients. The facility was part of a much larger project:

The new patient care facility is the first phase of an overall facilities master plan for the entire medical and research campus – one designed to meet future health care, education and research needs. Further down the road, in Phase 2 and Phase 3, we will build a facility on the site of the existing hospital where patient care providers will provide complex outpatient care, linked with inpatient services in the new patient care facility. The medical research and educational activities of the university will primarily be located west of Limestone creating a multidisciplinary learning and research environment for the colleges of the medical center. Planning is under way to further define this part of our campus.

The $450 million 1,000,000 sq ft (93,000 m^{2}) patient care facility was constructed as a ten-floor structure. There is currently a four-floor base with an emergency department, radiology services, eight new operating rooms, same day surgery facilities, a post-anesthesia care unit, and a recovery area, along with a new lobby, coffee shop, gift shop, and waiting areas. Constructed above this are two separate six-floor patient bed towers. The patient rooms are mostly private and very flexible, in that they can be converted into intensive care units with ease.

The original plans called for one patient tower, but this was amended to include two because of cost savings analysis. UK Healthcare would save $10 to $12 million by constructing the second patient tower instead of adding it in on a later date. It is also advantageous because the construction plans and cranes would already be in place and that disruptions would be minimal.

On January 23, 2007, it was announced that an additional 192 beds would be requested, adding two floors to each patient tower; it would only add two months to construction. A state certificate was filed because the hospital saw a record number of patients in December. Accounting for an annual 4.5% growth rate, the hospital would be at 100% capacity by 2011. The hospital, however, has been achieving a 10% annual growth rate. The hospital is currently at 85% capacity.

To solve the potential issue of patient crowding, the University of Kentucky signed a letter of intent to purchase Samaritan Hospital adjacent to the campus on February 15, 2007. It was expected to hold as many as "100 UK patients" and solve all crowding issues until the construction was completed. The university would operate it for at least ten years but have an option to extend it.

Funding for the new patient care facility was generated through existing hospital revenues and bond issues. On May 30, 2007, ground was broken for phase one of the new hospital.

=== Phase II and III ===
During Phase II and III, the existing Chandler Hospital will be demolished in favor of a new facility for outpatient care that will be linked with inpatient services in the patient care facility constructed under Phase I. Medical research and educational support structures will be relocated primarily west of South Limestone.

Phase II is expected to cost at least $175 million.

== See also ==
- Buildings at the University of Kentucky
- Cityscape of Lexington, Kentucky
- University of Kentucky
