= Sarah Gibson Blanding =

President of Vassar College from 1946 to 1964

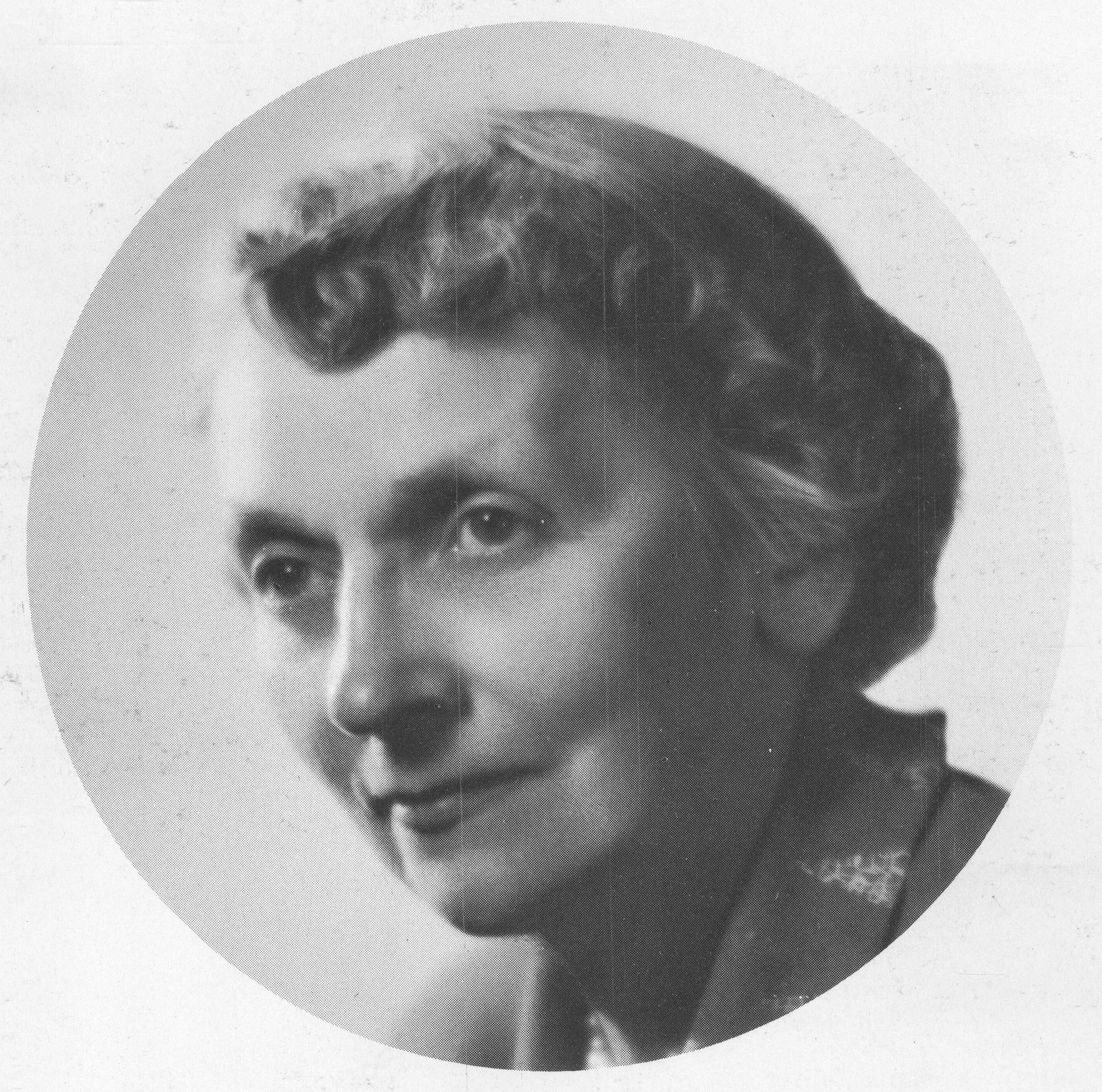
- Blanding in 1954

6th President of Vassar College
- In office 1946–1964
- Preceded by: Henry Noble MacCracken
- Succeeded by: Alan Simpson

Personal details
- Born: November 22, 1898
- Died: March 3, 1985 (aged 86)
- Education: University of Kentucky; Columbia University; London School of Economics
- Profession: College president College dean Basketball coach

Sarah Gibson Blanding (November 22, 1898 – March 3, 1985) was an American educator and academic administrator who served as Vassar College's sixth president (1946–1964) and its first female president. A strong public advocate, she worked hard to advance the professional, political, and academic place of women in the world and was a general proponent of expanded educational opportunity.

== Biography ==
Blanding was born on a farm in Kentucky in 1898. She attended the New Haven Normal School of Gymnastics, where she graduated in 1919. That same year, Blanding was hired as a physical education instructor by the University of Kentucky, where she simultaneously began her undergraduate work in the A.B. program. While at UK she coached the women's basketball team from 1919 through 1922, leading the team to a 3–14–1 record. She played on the team as team captain in 1923 under coach A.B. "Happy" Chandler. Upon graduation in 1923, Blanding was appointed the university's acting dean of women, becoming the youngest dean in the country, at age twenty-four. Blanding obtained her master's degree in political science at Columbia University in 1926, and pursued graduate studies at the London School of Economics under Harold Laski. In 1929, she was appointed dean of women and professor of political science at the University of Kentucky. She served in these positions until 1941, when she was selected as the first dean of Cornell University's College of Home Economics and became the first female dean at Cornell.

Blanding was named president of Vassar College in 1946. One member of the Board of Trustees explained that they selected her because she impressed them as a "great personality". Indeed, Blanding was always known for her outspoken character; at Cornell she was praised for being an effectively aggressive administrator. Blanding herself credited her independent and charged personality to her upbringing on a farm and to the running of her own tobacco farm in Kentucky for many years.

A biography of Sarah Gibson Blanding would be incomplete without mentioning the famous "no sex until marriage" speech that she gave in April 1962 to the students of Vassar College while serving as college president. She demanded that students (all females at that time) withdraw from the college if they engaged in premarital sex. This unusual and controversial speech was picked up by the media and made national news.

During her tenure at Vassar, Blanding instituted several important changes. In 1949, she helped establish the Mary Conover Mellon Foundation for the Advancement of Education, a research program that studied and promoted the psychological welfare of college students. An evaluation of Vassar was conducted under Blanding's leadership in the form of a two-year assessment, which reviewed everything from living conditions to academic objectives. A new curriculum that emphasized independent study was put into place as a result. Blanding encouraged the advancement of faculty members at Vassar on a merit system, not years served, and increased faculty salaries by 116%. She also instituted the house fellow system, where faculties lived in dormitories alongside students. Blanding raised $25 million for Vassar in nine years, tripling its endowment. Three new buildings (Ferry House, Chicago Hall, and Noyes House) were erected, and three major reconstructions of older buildings occurred during her presidency.

Blanding died on March 3, 1985.

== Other work ==
Sarah Blanding served on many boards and commissions, often as the only woman. Her positions: consultant to the U.S. Secretary of War as member of the Joint Army and Navy Committee on Welfare and Recreation (1943–1946); member of the President's Commission on Higher Education under President Truman; and member of the Public Advisory Board of the Economic Cooperation Administration. Blanding had a prominent public presence. In the 1950s, she spoke out to protect the rights of several faculty members against allegations made by Senator Joseph McCarthy. Blanding received international attention on another occasion. Many students found an impromptu speech at a required convocation in 1964, reproaching premarital sex, alcohol, and "vulgar conduct" among Vassar students, out of step with their own mores. She also served as the first female on the First Board of Foreign Scholarships administering Fulbright Scholarships, and the National Committee that chose the first Marshall Scholarships.

Upon her retirement as Vassar president in 1964, the college presented Blanding with a tractor "evoking both the practical effects of her tenure and her Kentucky childhood". Blanding died in 1985. She had been a lifelong advocate of academic freedom and independent thinking for her students. "I like people," Blanding once said. "I like all kinds of people. I get along well with them because I trust them. I make it plain to everyone on my staff that I want them to stand up and fight for their own ideas. If they have better arguments, they win."

== Legacy ==
Blanding Tower as well as the low-rise Blanding I, II, III and IV dormitories at the University of Kentucky are named for Sarah Blanding.

== Sources ==
- Daniels, Elizabeth Adams. "Sarah Gibson Blanding" American National Biography. 1999 ed.
- "Everybody's Weekly." The Philadelphia Inquirer. 7 April 1946.
- "Sarah Gibson Blanding Obituary." The New York Times. 4 March 1985.
- "Vassar Saddened by Death of Sarah Gibson Blanding." Vassar Views. No. 80 March 1985: 1
- "Vassar College and its Eight Presidents, 1861-1986: An exhibition prepared to honor Frances D. Fergusson on the occasion of her inauguration as the ninth president of Vassar College." October 11, 1986.
