= Hilary J. Boone Center =

American university club

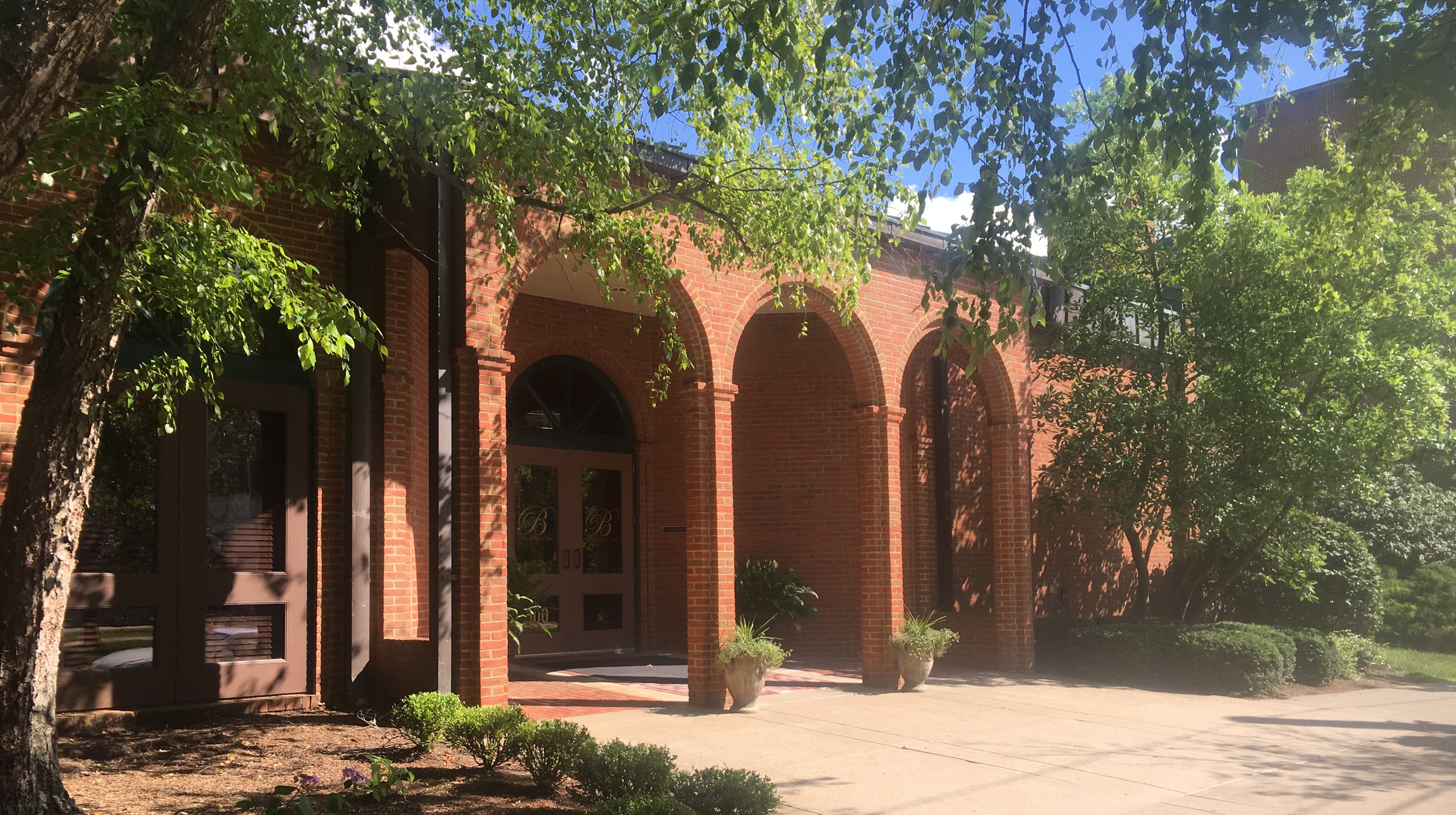
The Hilary J. Boone Center

The Hilary J. Boone Center was one of two university clubs at the University of Kentucky. The Club at UK's Spindletop Hall was its sister club, and both belong to the Association of College and University Clubs.

The Boone Center served as a meeting, dining and special event venue in the heart of campus, seating up to nearly 600 guests, offering several dining rooms, a library, bar, courtyard and gated terrace for upscale, casual dining, business meetings, and social events, including weddings. The one-story, 19,561 sq ft (1,817.3 m^{2}). structure was constructed in 1986. A private club, membership consists of university faculty, staff, alumni, university departments, corporations, fellows, parents and retirees. The building was renovated and reopened in July 2008 to feature more space, a decor make-over and additional parking.

Today, the Hillary J. Boone Center is home to the University of Kentucky's Office of Transformative Learning. This office, a subsidiary of the Office of Student Success, houses peer supported learning programs, including The Study and Supplemental Instruction. Integrated Success Coaching, another portion of Transformative Learning, also has offices located within The Boone Center.

== See also ==
- Buildings at the University of Kentucky
- Cityscape of Lexington, Kentucky
- University of Kentucky
