= Bill Gatton =

American entrepreneur and philanthropist (1932–2022)

- Born: Carol Martin Gatton; May 25, 1932; Bremen, Kentucky
- Died: April 18, 2022 (aged 89); Bristol, Tennessee
- Education: University of Kentucky (BS); University of Pennsylvania (MBA)
- Occupations: Entrepreneur, philanthropist
- Military career
- Allegiance: United States
- Branch: United States Army
- Years: 1954–1956
- Rank: Second Lieutenant

Carol Martin "Bill" Gatton (May 25, 1932 – April 18, 2022) was an American entrepreneur and philanthropist, well known for his charitable contributions to higher education.

== Early life and education ==
Gatton was born near Bremen, Kentucky, on May 25, 1932, the youngest of four children born to Harry and Edith (Martin) Gatton. He was raised on his family's farm in Bremen, where he showed an early interest in entrepreneurship.

In 1950, Gatton graduated valedictorian from Sacramento High School. He went on to study business and economics at the University of Kentucky while also working as a sales representative for a local Chevrolet dealership. He graduated with a Bachelor of Science degree in 1954, after which he commissioned as a second lieutenant in the United States Army, and served on active duty until 1956. In 1958, he graduated with a Master of Business Administration degree with an emphasis in banking and finance from the Wharton School of the University of Pennsylvania.

== Career ==
After graduating, Gatton moved back to Kentucky and established Bill Gatton Motors in Owensboro. He expanded the business by purchasing dealerships in Tennessee, Alabama, and Texas. The capital Gatton gained from these ventures was then reinvested in various banking and real estate interests, from which Gatton would gain most of his wealth. Drawn by his acquisition of additional dealerships in the area, Gatton moved to Bristol, Tennessee, in 1967.

=== Philanthropy ===
In 1985, Gatton founded The Bill Gatton Foundation for his philanthropic efforts.

In 1995, Gatton made a multimillion-dollar gift to the College of Business and Economics at UK, the largest gift ever made to the university prior to 2022. In his honor, the UK Board of Trustees later renamed the college "The Carol Martin Gatton College of Business and Economics." Opened in 2006, the East Tennessee State University Bill Gatton College of Pharmacy is also the namesake of Mr. Gatton. Gatton also donated a large sum of money to the formation of the gifted academy at Western Kentucky, opened in 2007 as the Carol Martin Gatton Academy of Mathematics and Science, where high school students could finish their last two years of high school taking rigorous college classes. In February 2022, the University of Kentucky announced a $5 million gift from Gatton. In May 2023, Mr. Gatton, through his namesake foundation, donated $100 million to the UK College of Agriculture, Food and Environment through The Bill Gatton Foundation. In December 2025, the University of Kentucky announced a $150 million gift was accepted from The Bill Gatton Foundation to construct a new arts district, including a new College of Fine Arts building and a several-hundred seat theater. This is the single largest scholarship gift UK has ever received, overtaking the Bill Gatton Foundation's previous record setting gift, and Gatton remains the university's single largest donor, exceeding $350 million.
