= Ashland Global =

American chemical company

Ashland Global Holdings, Inc.
- Type: Public
- Traded as: NYSE: ASH; S&P 400 Component
- Industry: Manufacturing & Chemical Distribution
- Founded: 1924
- Headquarters: Wilmington, Delaware, U.S.
- Key people: Chairman of the Board, Guillermo Novo (CEO)
- Products: Chemicals; Plastics; Products; Specialized Products; Services
- Revenue: ▼US$ 4.948 billion (FY 2016)
- Operating income: ▼US$ $327 million (FY 2016)
- Net income: ▼US$ -$29 million (FY 2016)
- Total assets: ▼US$ 3.16 billion (FY 2016)
- Total equity: ▼US$ 57 million (FY 2016)
- Number of employees: 6,500 (2017)
- Website: www.ashland.com

Ashland, Inc., is an American chemical company headquartered in Wilmington, Delaware. The company began as an oil refinery in the city of Ashland, Kentucky, in 1924, before moving to Wilmington in 1994. The company has five wholly owned divisions, which include Chemical Intermediates and Solvents, composites, industrial specialties, personal and home care, pharmaceuticals, food and beverage, and agriculture. Until 2017, the company was the primary manufacturer of Valvoline.

== History ==
=== Founding and early years ===
Ashland was founded in 1924 as the Ashland Refining Company in Catlettsburg, Kentucky, by Paul G. Blazer.

In October 1923, J. Fred Miles of the Swiss Oil Company of Lexington, Kentucky, employed Paul G. Blazer and assigned him the task of locating, purchasing and operating an oil refinery in northeastern Kentucky. Blazer selected a location on the banks of the Big Sandy River approximately two miles south of the Ohio River near the community of Leach Railroad Station, Kentucky. One mile south of the city of Catlettsburg, the site contained an existing refinery which was purchased by Blazer which had been in operation since 1916. The Catlettsburg site was advantageous due to its location near the Ohio River and offered an efficient means of transportation for the fledgling company. With funds supplied by Swiss Oil, Blazer arranged to buy, at a price of $212,500, the small unprofitable 1,000 barrel per day refinery of Great Eastern Refining Company which had been owned by coal operators in Huntington, West Virginia. With the purchase of the refinery came a small towboat and oil barge.

On February 2, 1924, Blazer and three Swiss Oil executives incorporated Ashland Refining Company, with a capital of $250,000. They took over the operations of the Catlettsburg Refinery which had twenty-five employees who were working seven days per week and twelve hours per day. Blazer moved from Lexington to Ashland. The only member of the Swiss Oil organization to come to Ashland with Blazer was Ashland Refining Company's first treasurer, William Waples.

Ashland's refinery operations in Catlettsburg proved to be successful even from the very first month. Wages were increased and the hours of work were reduced. After making repairs and purchasing some new, modern equipment, the refinery soon had output of 500,000 barrels a year (1370 barrels per calendar day) and sales of $1,300,000. In only a few years, the Ashland Refining Company began to show larger returns than the parent company. Ashland Refining Co. grew rapidly through both internal expansion and acquisitions including Union Gas and Oil Company (1925), Tri-State Refining Company (1930), and Cumberland Pipeline Company (1931).

By 1933, Ashland Refining Company owned more than 1,000 wells, 800 miles of pipelines, bulk distribution plants in twelve cities, service stations, river transportation terminals and river equipment. In 1936, under Blazer's leadership, the company's ownership changed from Swiss Oil to the Ashland Oil and Refining Company shareholder group and was headquartered in Ashland, Kentucky. Blazer was appointed Chief Executive Officer of the company.

Blazer's success as manager was recognized by major stockholders. They gave him the power to run Ashland as his own operation, though at no point during his tenure as Chief Executive Officer (1936–1957) did he own a controlling interest in the company.

Blazer's philosophy of supporting the well-being of company employees was evident early on. Two of his early changes were offering employees' sick leave with full pay, and in 1947 the introduction of an employee profit-sharing plan. This move made the company one of the first in the region to offer such benefits. Blazer supported creative arts and invited nearby Greenup County educator and internationally acclaimed author Jesse Stuart to open each annual meeting with a story, a poem, or a bit of humor. He also was a pastor at his local church.

=== Post-World War II ===
After the end of World War II, Ashland teamed with Sperry Corporation to develop the introduction of radar on commercial river vessels and teamed with various shipyards to develop the integrated tow. The "jumbo" tank barge of 195 ft. by 35 ft. became the industry standard and was used by Ashland. Under Blazer's control, the company grew to become a Forbes 500 company by relying on barges to bring in crude oil and deliver refined products to independent marketers. Ashland soon operated the nation's largest inland towing fleet and in 1953 the Port of Huntington-Tristate exceeded Pittsburgh as the busiest port on the Ohio River and the busiest inland port in the United States, a title it retains to date.

Ashland Oil & Refining Company also grew through many acquisitions such as the Allied Oil Company (1948), Cleveland and Lakeland Tankers (1948), Aetna Oil Company (1949), Freedom-Valvoline Company (1950), Frontier Oil of Buffalo (1950) and National Refining Company (1950).

By 1953, Ashland Oil and Refining Company had 3,518 miles of crude oil pipelines, 252 miles of product lines, six refineries processing an average of 124,000 barrels a day, operated nine tow boats on the inland waterways, and owned over 100 barges. Although still involved as chairman of Ashland's Finance Committee and Executive Committee, Blazer stepped down as Chief Executive Officer in 1957.

Louisville Refining Company was purchased in 1959. United Carbon was purchased in 1963.

In 1966, Ashland Oil and Refinery Company, Inc.'s sales had grown to $699,000,000.

Diversification continued with the purchase of Warren Brothers in 1966, which later was to become Ashland Paving and Construction. A major leap into the chemical industry occurred in 1967 when Ashland purchased Archer Daniels Midland Chemical Group. This chemical distribution segment of the business would go on to be one of the primary functions of the company in the later part of the 20th century. In 1969, the company reorganized to form Ashland Petroleum with Robert T. McCowan as its first president, as well as entering into a joint venture in Coal mining under the name Arch Mineral.

=== 1980s-1990s ===
In the 1980s and early 1990s, Ashland continued to expand, buying The Permian Corporation which it merged with Scurlock Oil Company in 1991 to form a subsidiary known as Scurlock Permian Corporation. In 1992, most of Unocal's chemical distribution business was acquired, making Ashland the top chemical distributor in North America. At this time, the Industrial Chemicals & Solvents (IC&S) division was established. The company's name was changed from "Ashland Oil, Incorporated" to the present "Ashland, Inc." in 1995, which noted the reduced importance of oil in the overall business.

In 1998, the petroleum division merged with Marathon Oil to form Marathon Ashland Petroleum, LLC (MAP). Following that in 1999, Ashland was #102 on the Fortune 200 list of companies when it agreed to sell its Scurlock Permian subsidiary to Plains All American Pipeline and the headquarters were moved from Ashland to Covington, Kentucky, although the company maintained an office building in Russell, adjacent to Ashland.

=== 21st century ===
A monumental change came in 2005, when Ashland sold its shares of the petroleum joint venture to Marathon Oil, effectively dissolving the remnants of their petroleum division. After the sale, the company was no longer involved in the refining or marketing of fuels. The original oil refinery in Catlettsburg, Kentucky, is still in operation to date, owned and operated by Marathon. In 2006, Ashland sold APAC (the paving and construction division) to the Oldcastle Materials subsidiary of Oldcastle, Inc. of Dublin, Ireland.

Ashland purchased the adhesive and emulsions divisions of Air Products and Chemicals, Inc. in 2008. and announced plans to acquire Hercules, Inc. in July 2008, for $3.3 billion. On November 13, 2008, the transaction was completed.

In July 2010 Ashland merged its foundry chemicals activity with Süd-Chemie of Munich, Germany, to form ASK Chemicals L.P. with headquarters in Dublin, Ohio.

In November 2010 Ashland announced plans to sell its distribution business known as Ashland Distribution to TPG Capital for $930 million. The Ashland Distribution business had been a part of Ashland since 1969 when it was known as Ashland Chemical. With revenues of $3.4 billion, the Ashland Distribution business had approximately 2,000 employees across North America and Europe, and entered the China plastics market in 2009. The sale was finalized April 1, 2011, with a final sale price of US$979 million. The new privately held company was named Nexeo Solutions, which was subsequestly purchased by Univar in 2019 to create Univar Solutions.

In May 2011 Ashland announced that it had bought the privately owned company International Specialty Products, Inc. (ISP) for $3.2 billion. ISP is a supplier of specialty chemicals and performance-enhancing products for consumer and industrial markets.

In 2014, Ashland Water Technologies was sold to a private equity fund managed by Clayton, Dubilier & Rice.

In May 2017, Ashland spun off its Valvoline business as Valvoline, Inc. (NYSE:VVV), the final step of reorganizing itself as a global specialty chemicals company.

In January 2019, Ashland struck a deal with activist investor Cruiser Capital Advisors, which had planned to mount a proxy fight to replace four board directors. Instead, the two parties reached an agreement involving a consulting role for one of Cruiser's director nominees and more input regarding future board appointees.

In October 2019, Ashland announced Guillermo Novo would succeed William A. Wulfsohn as chairman and chief executive officer.

In February 2022, Ashland sold its Performance Adhesives business to Arkema.

=== Investor concerns ===
Ancora Alternatives, an activist investment company headquartered in Cleveland, Ohio, which hold a significant stake in Ashland, bought stock in the company after its stock price dropped in April after disappointing second-quarter earnings reports. Ashland's stock price hit a high in December 2022, but since then has fallen around 50%. As of June 9, Ashland had a market cap of $2.7 billion.

According to a shareholder presentation, Ancora wants Ashland to sell itself because it believes that the transaction could increase the stock price by at least 30%, pushing the share price to at least $76. Ancora said it is willing to launch a proxy fight in September 2026 to push the issue. The company Standard Industries is Ashland's biggest investor, with a stake of nearly 10%. Industry analysts have speculated that it could be among a group of potential buyers for Ashland.

The CEO of Ashland, Guillermo Novo, was appointed to the job in October 2019. His initial mandate was to transform the company into a pure-play specialty chemicals platform. He was tasked with non-core divestitures, cost reductions, and balance sheet repairs, according to Ancora's presentation. Ancora believes Novo, who has been in charge for seven years, has largely failed shareholders. Ancora noted several concerns about Novo's credibility during his leadership and execution. Under his tenure, Ashland missed consensus estimates in four out of the five last quarters. Compared with his proxy peers, the company under his leadership suffered substantially negative total shareholder returns across multiple time frames. Under Novo's tenure, the company has seen a 23.9% decline in share price and a 50% drop from its December 2022 peak. The company's overall enterprise value decreased by $3.4 billion. Its market cap dropped by $1.9 billion.

=== Settlement ===
On July 28, Bloomberg reported that Ashland and activist investor Ancora Holdings Group reached a settlement from Ancora's activist campaign which would add two new directors to the board. The settlement would also create a capital allocation committee. That same day, Ashland announced the appointment of two new independent directors, Peter Thomas and Allen Spizzo, to the board. Thomas formerly ran Ferro Corporation, while Spizzo is a former executive of Hercules Inc.

== Company histories ==
- Scott, Otto J. The Exception: The Story of Ashland Oil & Refining Company. McGraw Hill, 1968.

== See also ==
- List of S&P 400 companies
