= Charles T. Wethington Jr. =

American academic administrator

10th President of the University of Kentucky
- In office December 28, 1989 (Note: Interim president until September 18, 1990) – June 30, 2001
- Preceded by: David Roselle
- Succeeded by: Lee T. Todd Jr.

Personal details
- Born: January 2, 1936 (age 90) Casey County, Kentucky, U.S.
- Education: Eastern Kentucky University (BA); University of Kentucky (BA, PhD)

Charles T. Wethington Jr. (born January 2, 1936) was the tenth president of the University of Kentucky from 1990 to 2001.

== Early life ==
Wethington graduated from St. Bernard High School in Clementsville, Kentucky, attended Brescia College from 1952 to 1954 and transferred to Eastern Kentucky University where he was graduated in 1956 with a B.A. in English and History. He received a B.A. in 1962 from the University of Kentucky in Education as well as his Ph.D. in 1966. He then served on the faculty of UK and was an administrator at several levels in University of Kentucky's Community College System, the forerunner to the current Kentucky Community and Technical College System, culminating in his appointment as Chancellor for the Community College System.

== President of UK ==
Wethington was appointed Interim President of the University of Kentucky in 1989 and appointed as President in 1990. He set out to raise the academic standards for admission and instruction at the university and was successful at this, evidenced by admissions test scores and national rankings for programs at the school. He oversaw the building and opening of the central library facility, the William T. Young Library in 1998, as well as 40 other building projects at the university.

On June 30, 2001, Wethington stepped down as president and served for two years in a fundraising role for UK. He is now retired in Lexington.

== Legacy ==
The University of Kentucky opened the Charles T. Wethington Jr. Building in 2003, named in his honor.

He was named to the University of Kentucky's Hall of Distinguished Alumni in 1995.
