= William T. Young Library =

Central library at the University of Kentucky

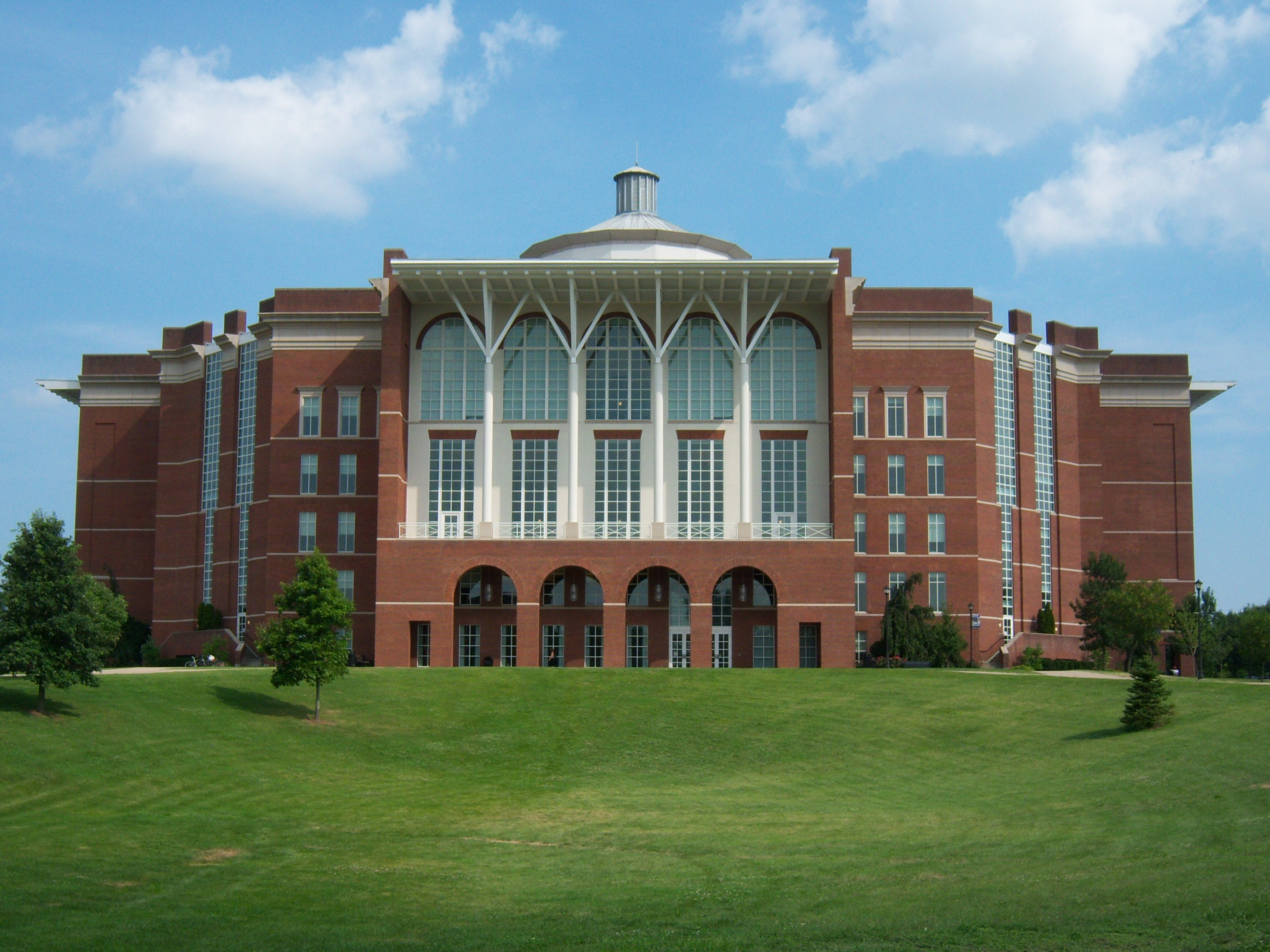
- West facade
- 38.03273°N 84.50154°W
- Location: 500 S. Limestone Street, University of Kentucky, Lexington, KY 40506-0456, United States
- Type: Public
- Established: April 3, 1998; 28 years ago

Collection
- Size: 1.2 million volumes

Other information
- Website: libraries.uky.edu/WTYL

The William T. Young Library (colloquially 'Willy T.') is located on the campus of the University of Kentucky in Lexington, Kentucky, United States. It is named for William T. Young, a prominent local businessman, horse breeder, philanthropist and alumnus of the university, who began fundraising efforts with a donation of $5 million. The facility serves as a central library for the university's social sciences, humanities, and life sciences collections, and acts as a federal depository and a public library for the state of Kentucky. It holds the record among public universities in the nation for the largest book endowment.

== History ==
The history of the library dates back to the mid-1970s when then-University President Otis A. Singletary and successor David Roselle urged the state of Kentucky to fund a research library yearly between 1975 and 1989. This came after an addition to the Margaret I. King Library was completed. However, funding for the new library never materialized due to budget cuts from the state.

In 1990, then-President Charles Wethington pledged to the faculty and students that building a new library would be "top priority;" however, he was met with much resistance from state leaders. The university initiated a massive fund-raising campaign 1991. The top donor who kick-started the project was Lexington businessman and horse breeder William T. Young, who gave $5 million; the university would later raise $21.5 million.

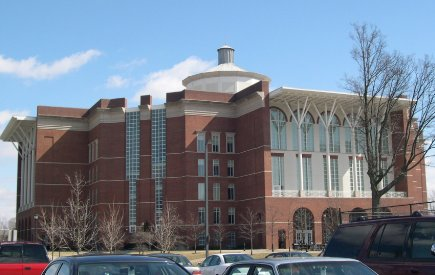
William T. Young Library

In 1992, the university received state approval to spend $12 million on design and site preparation, but the General Assembly in 1994 did not approve the capital project. In order to start the project, Wethington established an unusual funding method: the city of Lexington would sell $41 million in bonds, and the proceeds would go to the University of Kentucky Alumni Association and Athletic Association, a semi-independent organization that would become the owner and builder of the library. The annual debt service on the library bonds is currently being paid from $3.2 million it receives annually from the Athletics Association.

In 1994, construction began on the new library, which was named after William T. Young, the first large donor to the project. The site's location was a "high spot between two sinkholes," which required the burying of 202 steel-reinforced concrete caissons into the soil to prevent the structure from sinking or tilting.

The library was dedicated on April 3, 1998, at a cost of $58 million. It is the most expensive construction project in the University of Kentucky's history. The deed at the ceremony was handed over from the Alumni Association to the university.

=== Relocation of library media ===
Moving the books from the former Margaret I. King Library to the new William T. Young Library was not an easy task. If stretched out from end-to-end, the number of books in the old library would snake from Lexington to St. Louis. The university hired William B. Meyer, part of United Van Lines, to move 1.2 million volumes from four locations. The move took eight weeks to complete, beginning on May 11, 1998, at a cost of $500,000. 74 part-time laborers were involved at a cost of 34,560 person-hours. During this time, all books were kept in circulation and if a student were to request a volume, it would be accessible "within twenty-four hours." Adding on to the complications was the fact that 700,000 of the existing volumes had to be converted from the antiquated Dewey decimal system to the Library of Congress Classification system.

== Features ==
=== Exterior ===
The library was designed by Kallmann McKinnell & Wood Architects, Inc. of Boston, in association with Nolan and Nolan of Louisville, and the construction cost was $58 million. Its exterior features a unique octagonal shape, two-story brick-and-stone arcades on each facade and two-story windows.

=== Interior ===
The six-story library contains over 1.2 million volumes and can seat over 4,000 patrons; 3,000 of these seats are in open-floor plan regions, with the remainder located in group study rooms. Each seat is equipped with or adjacent to a computer data jack. Initially, there were 600 desktop computers available, three times as many as was in the former Margaret I. King Library, and 40 laptop computers, half of which were wireless utilizing cellular phone access cards.

When it was constructed, it was the only library in the country to house all of its volumes on mobile compact shelves which are controlled by the push of a button. This innovative method of storing thousands of books in a relatively small amount of space freed room for work spaces, study halls and reading rooms.

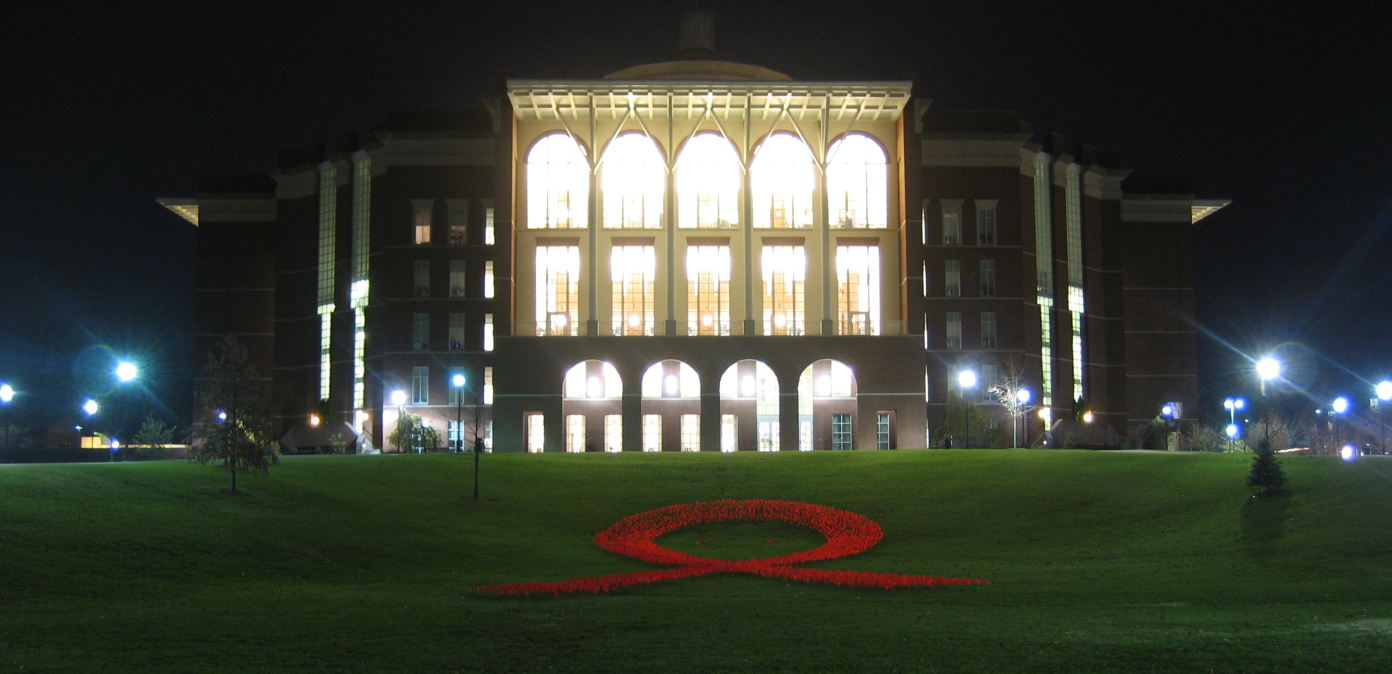
William T. Young Library in November 2007

The lobby features Treuchtlingen marble mined from southern Germany. The layout of the interior is reminiscent of a "building within a building" concept, with a center atrium that houses the circulation area on the first floor and reading rooms on the second and fifth floors. The rotunda is surrounded by skylights that give natural light into the central atrium, and features a chandelier that weighs 3,700 lb (1,700 kg). The chandelier fell while undergoing maintenance in late 2014 and was replaced in 2019 by a replica created by SPI Lighting. The 350,000 sq ft (33,000 m^{2}) building has six elevators and all floors are fully handicap accessible.

A 150-seat auditorium is located at the University Drive entrance. A Starbucks is located on the east wing of the building.

== See also ==
- Buildings at the University of Kentucky
- Cityscape of Lexington, Kentucky
- University of Kentucky
