= Catlettsburg Refinery =

Oil refinery in Kentucky

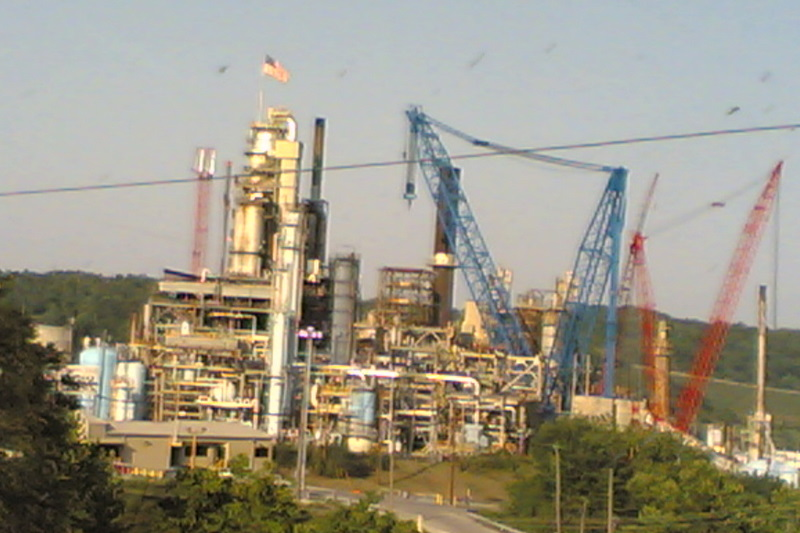

- Location within Kentucky Location within the United States
- Location: Catlettsburg, Kentucky, Kentucky, United States; 38°22′27″N 82°35′55″W

Refinery details
- Owner: Marathon Petroleum Corporation
- Opened: 1922
- Capacity: 277,000 barrels per day (44,000 m^{3}/d)
- No. of employees: 775

The Catlettsburg Refinery is an American oil refinery. It is located in northeastern Kentucky, at the intersection of Interstate 64 and U.S. Route 23 in Catlettsburg, Kentucky near the cities of Ashland, Kentucky and Huntington, West Virginia. The facility was built in 1916 by the Great Eastern Refining Company and purchased in 1924 by the Ashland Refining Company. The refinery now occupies a 650-acre (260 ha) plus site, producing more than 291,000 barrels per day (46,300 m^{3}/d), and employing around 1,600 employees and contractors. Its location on the west banks of the Big Sandy River and only two miles south of the Ohio River, allows it to ship products by barge as well as pipeline. It is owned and operated by Marathon Petroleum Corporation.

Due to the coal mining industry and the large quantity of petroleum products shipped from the refinery, the Port of Huntington Tri-State is the largest inland port in the United States, with 76.5 million tons shipped in 2007.

== See also ==
- List of oil refineries
