= Sanders–Brown Center on Aging =

Coordinates: 38.033115°N 84.508789°W

The Sanders–Brown Center on Aging at the University of Kentucky in Lexington, Kentucky, is responsible for research, education and service programs in aging. A Council on Aging program was founded at the University of Kentucky in 1963. In 1972, a grant from the Eleanor and John Y. Brown Jr. Foundation led to the construction of the current facility. Brown had just sold his interest in Kentucky Fried Chicken (KFC). The center was named for the Browns and KFC brand ambassador (Col.) Harlan Sanders in 1979. The four-story brick and concrete structure fronts South Limestone at the edge of the medical campus. The complex features 32 research laboratories that employs more than 150.

Additional funding later from the state led to a program in biomedical research within the Chandler Medical Center.

In 1998, the structure was expanded by 30,000 sq ft (2,800 m^{2}).

== See also ==
- Buildings at the University of Kentucky
- Cityscape of Lexington, Kentucky
- University of Kentucky
