= Herman Lee Donovan =

American educator and college administrator (1887–1964)

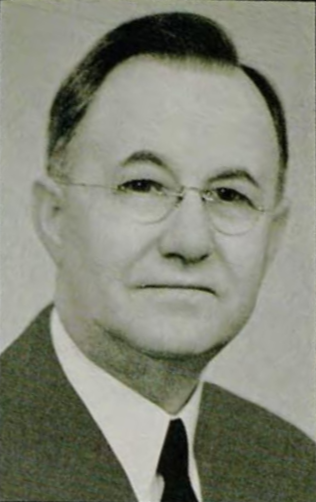
- Donovan, c. 1942

4th President of the University of Kentucky
- In office 1941–1956
- Preceded by: Frank L. McVey
- Succeeded by: Frank G. Dickey

5th President of Eastern Kentucky University
- In office 1928–1941
- Preceding: Thomas J. Coates
- Succeeded by: William F. O'Donnell

Personal details
- Born: March 17, 1887 Maysville, Kentucky
- Died: November 21, 1964 (aged 77) Lexington, Kentucky
- Resting place: Lexington Cemetery, Lexington, Kentucky

Herman Lee Donovan (March 17, 1887 – November 21, 1964) served as the fifth president of Eastern Kentucky University, known for keeping the university financially stable during the Great Depression. He then became the fourth president of the University of Kentucky during World War II. Donovan worked to desegregate UK and accommodated the influx of veterans coming in after the war.

== Early life ==
Donovan was a farm boy who sold his horses for money in order to go to college and because of that, he became the first student enrolled in Western Kentucky State Normal School (now Western Kentucky University) in 1908. Donovan was a superintendent while studying at State University (now the University of Kentucky) to get his BA in 1914, received his M.A in 1920 from Columbia Teachers College (now Columbia University), and then went on to eventually get his doctorate from George Peabody College for Teachers in Nashville in 1925.

== Presidency of Eastern Kentucky University ==
Donovan became president of Eastern Kentucky State Normal School (now Eastern Kentucky University) in 1928. Donovan became Eastern Kentucky's fourth president and the first president to have a doctorate. One of the reasons he was selected to be president is because he was a previous dean of faculty at Eastern. Donovan was known to have brought a lot of innovation and activism to Richmond despite being severely affected by the Great Depression. He ensured Eastern stayed within its income with salary cutbacks and hard decisions made. Donovan terminated the normal school in 1930, then created a division of graduate study in 1935 with the right to grant a master's degree in teaching, and Eastern became a teacher's college. Despite the immense challenges brought forth by the Great Depression, Donovan managed to take advantage of various federal funding initiatives, securing funding for a physical plant expansion. Donovan built many new buildings while at Eastern including Fitzpatrick Arts Building, Miller, Beckham, and McCreary Halls, and the Keen Johnson Student Union. All these buildings had been constructed with federal funding Donovan collected.

== Presidency of the University of Kentucky ==
After serving as the president at Eastern Kentucky University until 1941 he went on to become the fourth president of the University of Kentucky. Being president during the Second World war was happening resulted in a lot of male students leaving for war. To get more men enrolling in the university Donovan made early graduate programs for ROTC enlistees and students drafted. After the war, he used more federal funding to construct a residential village to place veterans and their families. While at the University of Kentucky, he nearly doubled the size of enrollment of approximately 4,000 students. He was encouraging and willing to help a struggling professor and even raised their wages because most teachers were in poverty after the Great Depression. Donovan pushed for a college of pharmacy, a new medical center, a department of journalism, and a school of home economics. Donovan worked to get the first “class” of African Americans in the fall of 1954 and the official academic segregation of the campus was ended.

== Death ==
Donovan stepped down as president and retired in 1956. He never sought to be a college president, but he was tagged for the position and hopes he was a great teacher along the way. Herman Lee Donovan died at the age of 77 in Lexington on November 21, 1964. In Donovan's honor, EKU named the Model Laboratory School building the Donovan building to recognize how much he did for the school through the Great Depression.
