= Ethington =

Ethington is an English surname. Notable people with the surname include:

- Raymond L. Ethington (1929–2026), American paleontologist
- Tom Ethington (born 1980), American lacrosse player

== See also ==
- Ettington
