= Albert D. Kirwan =

American football coach, historian, and university administrator (1904–1971)

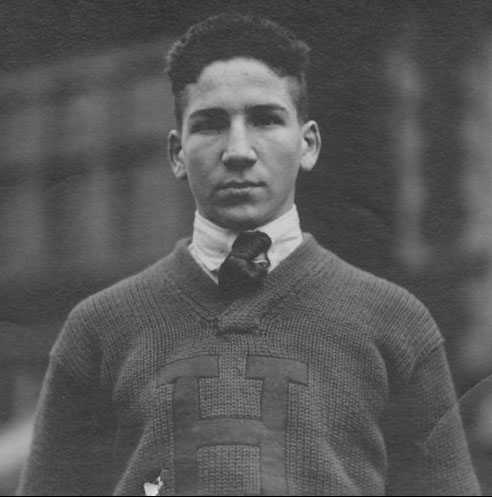
- Kirwan in 1921

7th President of the University of Kentucky
- In office July 1968 – August 1969
- Preceded by: John W. Oswald
- Succeeded by: Otis A. Singletary

Personal details
- Born: Albert Dennis Kirwan; December 22, 1904 Louisville, Kentucky, U.S.
- Died: November 30, 1971 (aged 66) Lexington, Kentucky, U.S.

Albert Dennis "Ab" Kirwan (December 22, 1904 – November 30, 1971) was an American football coach and university administrator. He was the seventh president of the University of Kentucky. He also was the head football coach at Kentucky from 1938 to 1944.

Kirwan received the A.B. degree from UK in 1926, an M.A. degree from the University of Louisville in 1944 and was awarded an LL.B. degree from the Jefferson School of Law and a doctorate from Duke University, in 1947.

After leaving the football program, Kirwan took a fellowship in history at Duke University. He returned to UK as a professor and an administrator, serving as dean of men, dean of students, and dean of the graduate school. He served as president of the university for a short period in 1968 prior to Otis Singletary's presidency.

Kirwan wrote or co-wrote several history books, including Revolt of the Rednecks: Mississippi Politics, and was a lecturer at other American and European universities. His legacy is remembered at UK with the naming of Kirwan Tower and the low-rise Kirwan dormitories for Dr. Kirwan. They were established in 1951 and have served as dorms for students until recently when the UK board of trustees approved funding for their demolition in 2019.

Kirwan's son, William English Kirwan, a 1962 UK graduate, was the third chancellor of the University System of Maryland, and former president of the University of Maryland, College Park and Ohio State University.

== Head coaching record ==
Year	Team	Overall	Conference	Standing	Bowl/playoffs
Kentucky Wildcats (Southeastern Conference) (1938–1942)
1938	Kentucky	2–7	0–4	12th	
1939	Kentucky	6–2–1	2–2–1	T–5th	
1940	Kentucky	5–3–2	1–2–2	9th	
1941	Kentucky	5–4	0–4	12th	
1942	Kentucky	3–6–1	0–5	T–11th	
Kentucky Wildcats (Southeastern Conference) (1944)
1944	Kentucky	3–6	1–5	9th	
Kentucky:		24–28–4	4–22–3		
Total:		24–28–4			
