= Gatton College of Business and Economics =

Business school of the University of Kentucky

Coordinates: 38.038056°N 84.506525°W

- Type: Public business school
- Established: 1925
- Parent institution: University of Kentucky
- Dean: Simon Sheather
- Location: Lexington, Kentucky, United States
- Website: gatton.uky.edu

Gatton College of Business and Economics is a college of the University of Kentucky. Gatton College educates more than 4,000 undergraduate, master's, and doctoral students in accounting, economics, finance, management, and marketing and supply chain management. Founded in 1925 as the College of Commerce, the college was created from the Department of Economics and was given full accreditation by the Association to Advance Collegiate Schools of Business International. Initially the college occupied a single room in White Hall. In 1995, the Board of Trustees renamed the college in honor of Mr. Carol Martin "Bill" Gatton, '54, in recognition of his $14 million pledge. The donation was the largest in the history of the university. The current dean is Simon J. Sheather. The college is located in central campus along South Limestone. In Bloomberg Businessweek's 2024–2025 Business School ROI Calculator, Gatton ranked first in annual return-on-investment percentage.

== Academic units ==
Business school rankings

U.S. MBA Rankings
- Bloomberg (2025): 71

- Von Allmen School of Accountancy
- Economics
- John Maze Stewart Department of Finance & Quantitative Methods
- Management
- Marketing & Supply Chain

=== Degrees offered ===
- Bachelor of Science in Accounting
- Bachelor's degrees in Economics
- Bachelor of Business Administration – Decision Science and Information Systems (currently under review)
- Bachelor of Business Administration – Finance
- Bachelor of Business Administration – Marketing
- Bachelor of Business Administration – Management
- Master of Business Administration
- Master of Science in Accounting
- Master of Science in Economics
- Master of Science in Finance
- Ph.D. in Business Administration with a specialization in Accounting
- Ph.D. in Economics
- Ph.D. in Business Administration
  - Decision Science and Information Systems (currently under review)
  - Finance and Quantitative Methods
  - Management
  - Marketing and Supply Chain

== Research centers ==
LINKS International Center for Social Network Research is a center for the study of social networks within and between organizations.

Gatton College of Business and Economics houses the Center for Business and Economic Research (CBER).

The Von Allmen Center for Entrepreneurship is also housed within Gatton College of Business and Economics.

== Gatton Business and Economics Building ==
Constructed in the 1960s and opening in 1963 as the Commerce Building, it was renovated and expanded with a new wing for classrooms in 1992. The original 1963 wing contains graduate and faculty offices for the accounting and economic departments and includes the MBA center. It also features one large auditorium. The 1992 extension added a new three-floor atrium, a new computer laboratory, and 24 classrooms.

The facility has been well maintained, but, as with most facilities of its age, some of the basic mechanical and electrical components had reached the end of their useful lives by the 2010s. None of the then-current classrooms supported modern technology and the current structure of the facility allowed only limited renovations or expansions of smaller classrooms. Further, the existing building's limited floor-to-floor heights did not allow classrooms to be outfitted with modern learning technology.

UK long had this facility as a top request. Prior plans had suggested a completely new facility with estimated project costs of approximately $100 million. The university recognized that the prior plan could not be achieved given 21st-century public financing realities, and turned to private philanthropy for the project. To that end, the university took a fresh look at the existing facility and reviewed the feasibility and cost of a dramatic renovation and expansion to house modern classrooms, an auditorium, and student assembly spaces. The ultimate concept was then estimated to cost $65 million.

On March 1, 2013, the University of Kentucky's Gatton College of Business and Economics celebrated the milestone of surpassing the halfway point in its fundraising efforts for the expansion and renovation of its facilities. Joined by UK President Eli Capilouto, Gatton College Dean David W. Blackwell announced that nearly $34 million in private funds has been donated or pledged toward the $65 million project.

The project was part of UK's overall capital improvement plan (House Bill 7) approved by the Kentucky General Assembly and signed into law by Gov. Steve Beshear on February 21, 2013. No state tax dollars were used in any of the UK construction projects, which included the Gatton College, a new science building on campus, and improvements to Commonwealth Stadium (since renamed Kroger Field) and UK's football facilities.

Construction of the Gatton expansion and renovation project began in late 2013. The original timetable called for completion of the project by the fall of 2015 or early in 2016, but the facility did not open until August 2016, with an official reopening ceremony that October.

== Notable people ==
- Simon Sheather, 8th Gatton College dean

== See also ==
- List of University of Kentucky buildings
- Cityscape of Lexington, Kentucky
- University of Kentucky
