= Linda and Jack Gill Heart Institute =

Coordinates: 38.031467°N 84.508502°W

The Linda and Jack Gill Heart Institute at the University of Kentucky is housed at the Chandler Medical Center along Rose Street. Opened in 2004, the five-level 108,000 sq ft (10,000 m^{2}). structure houses clinics, diagnostic areas, six Cath and EP laboratories with associated support services and numerous administrative and faculty offices. It will also house, in the future, the University of Kentucky Hospital Center for Advanced Surgery that will include waiting areas, pre-operative and post-operative preparatory and recovery rooms and eight operating rooms.

The building is attached to the University of Kentucky Critical Care Unit and is across from the Charles T. Wethington Jr. Building.

The goals of the center are,

1. To develop a nationally and internationally recognized center of excellence in cardiovascular research;
2. To provide an environment for the development and retention of productive faculty;
3. To facilitate the training of students, including postdoctoral fellows, graduate students, medical students and residents; and
4. To encourage the development of translational and clinical research with funding from federal agencies and industry.

Renovations to the 5,000 sq ft (460 m^{2}). first floor shell space will create a new Cardiology Center that will include Cardiology Diagnostics and Clinical Research Programs, as well as two MRI units and one CT scanner. Construction is expected to begin on the completion of the shell space on May 4, 2007, at a cost of $6.5 million.

== See also ==
- Buildings at the University of Kentucky
- Cityscape of Lexington, Kentucky
- University of Kentucky
