= Port of Huntington Tri-State =

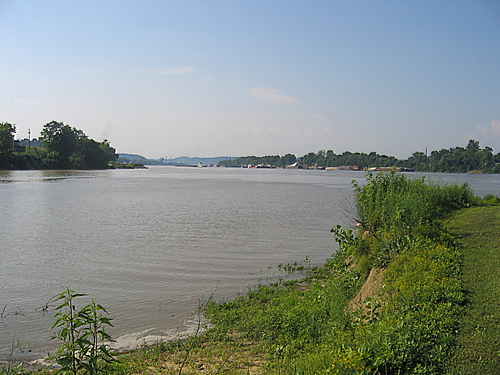

Location
- Country: United States
- Location: Huntington, West Virginia

Details
- Opened: November 1, 2000
- Owned by: Huntington District Waterways Association
- Type of harbour: Inland

Statistics
- Annual cargo tonnage: 58,551,459 (2011)
- Website huntingtonwaterways.com

The Port of Huntington Tri-State, centered on the Ohio River in Huntington, West Virginia, is the second-largest inland port in the United States, and was formerly the largest. It is the largest river port in the state of West Virginia and the 15th-largest in the United States as of 2012. Included in the port's area is 100 miles of the Ohio River from the mouth of the Scioto River in Portsmouth, Ohio to the northern border of Gallia County, Ohio, 9 miles of the Big Sandy River, and 90 miles of the Kanawha River. The United States Army Corps of Engineers' 1953 Ohio River Navigation Modernization Program sited the Greenup Locks and Dam project as an early priority so that its pool could serve the Port of Huntington Tri-State. It exceeded Pittsburgh in 1953 as the busiest port on the waterway. In 2014, it was exceeded by the Port of Cincinnati-Northern Kentucky in annual cargo tonnage, making it the second-largest inland port in the United States.

== See also ==
- Catlettsburg Refinery
- List of ports in the United States
- List of North American ports
- Transportation in Huntington, West Virginia
