= Anderson Hall (Lexington, Kentucky) =

Coordinates: 38°02′14.50″N 84°30′20″W

Mechanical Hall (or Old Anderson Hall or Dicker Hall) at the University of Kentucky, was completed in January 1892 and served as the home to the engineering department. It was known as Dicker Hall by the 1930s and was renamed Anderson Hall in 1948. The building stood as a modern engineering complex, teaching such courses as nuclear engineering, gas dynamics, motion and time study, power plants, heat transfer and thermodynamics, as well as air conditioning. In 1939 the construction of three buildings and the Wendt shop next to Dicker Hall comprised the quadrangle. From the 1940s to the 1960s it is the third largest department in the college of engineering. It was named after F. Paul Anderson, who became the first dean of the College of Engineering on September 18, 1918. Old Anderson Hall was razed in August 1964. Immediately after F. Paul Anderson Tower begins construction and was dedicated April 8, 1967.
