= Charles T. Wethington Jr. Building =

University of Kentucky building

Coordinates: 38.031968°N 84.508649°W

The Charles T. Wethington Jr. Building is a 210,300 sq. ft. six-story brick and concrete structure for the University of Kentucky in Lexington, Kentucky, located at the corner of Rose Street and South Limestone. It houses offices for the dean and faculty for the College of Health Sciences, along with numerous classrooms and teaching laboratories. It also is host to the offices of the Chancellor of the Medical Center, research facilities and research space for the College of Health Sciences.

The original date of completion was April 2002; however, it did not open until February 2003. It is across from the Gill Heart Institute and is linked by a two-story pedestrian overpass.

The building is named for Charles T. Wethington Jr., tenth president of the university.

== See also ==
- Buildings at the University of Kentucky
- Cityscape of Lexington, Kentucky
