= Singletary Center for the Arts =

Performing arts center at the University of Kentucky

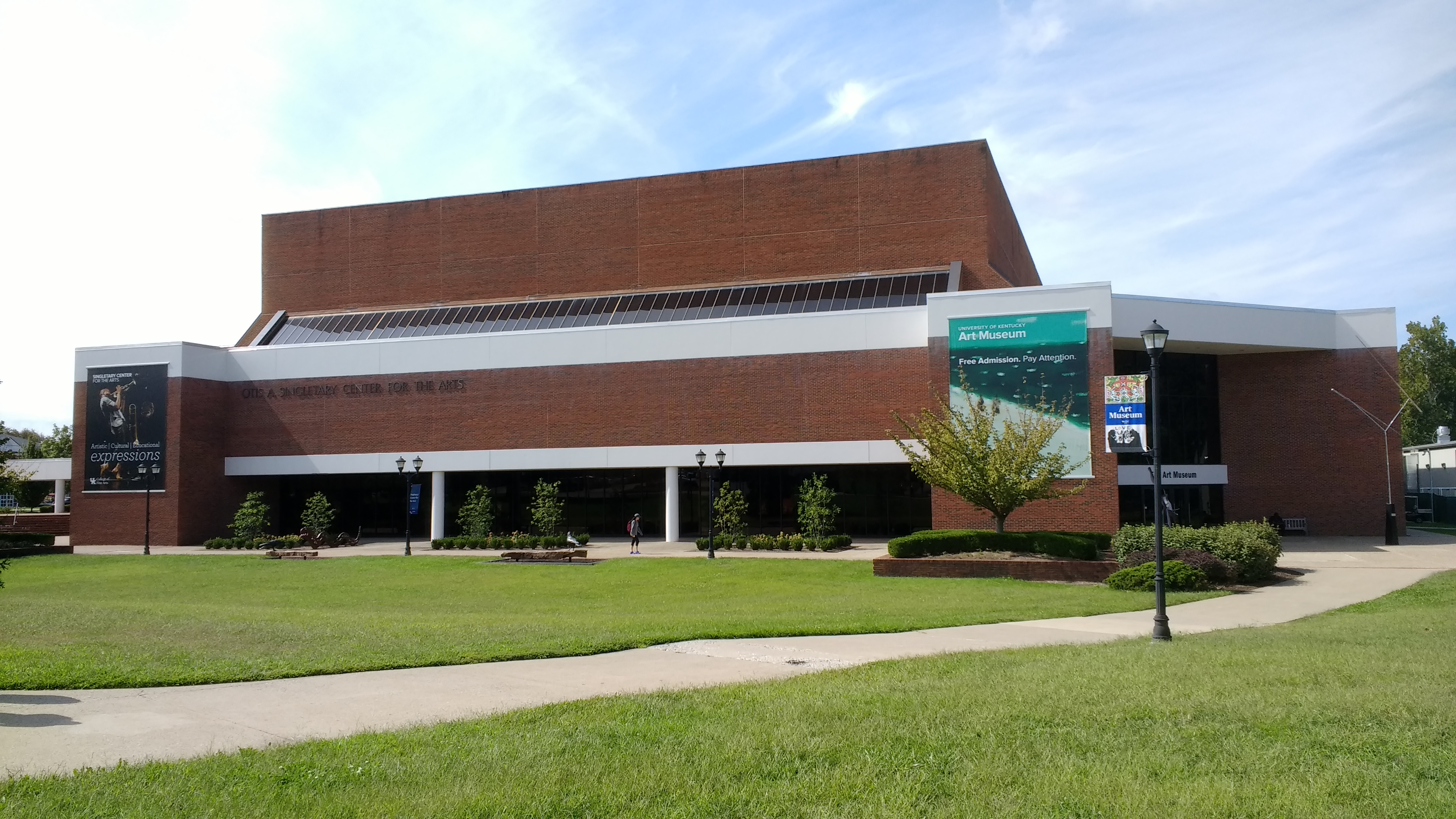
- Interactive map of Singletary Center for the Arts
- Location: 405 Rose Street; Lexington, Kentucky
- Coordinates: 38.037995°N 84.501177°W
- Owner: University of Kentucky
- Seating type: Reserved
- Capacity: 1,502
- Type: Performance venue

Construction
- Opened: November 1, 1979

Originally opened on November 1, 1979, as Center for the Arts, the Singletary Center for the Arts is a fine arts complex located on the campus of the University of Kentucky in Lexington, Kentucky. Nearly eight years after its opening, on April 16, 1987, Center for the Arts was dedicated to and renamed after the eighth president of the university, Dr. Otis A. Singletary, becoming henceforth known as the Singletary Center for the Arts.

As part of the College of Fine Arts and essential to the UK School of Music, the Singletary Center for the Arts’ mission is to host artistic, cultural and educational events for the university community, Lexington community and the Commonwealth of Kentucky. Additionally, the Singletary Center provides professional, full-service venues for the creation, practical application, and dissemination of artistic, cultural and educational expressions by international, national, regional, university, and student performers, artists, and speakers.

Since its opening in 1979, The Singletary Center for the Arts has served over 3.7 million patrons and has come to host over 400 events annually. Among these 400 annual events, Singletary plays host to a variety of musical performances spanning genres such as orchestral, choral, jazz, rock, world, and bluegrass music as well as dance, comedy, and lecture events. Some notable performers and speakers at Singletary include jazz legend Herbie Hancock, the Moscow Ballet, comedian Bill Burr, author David Sedaris, and many more.

== Notable events ==
Performer(s)/Lecturer(s)	Event Type	Year of Appearance
Three 6 Mafia & Hypnotize Camp Posse	Music, Rap	2000
Herbie Hancock	Music, Jazz	2002
Jane Goodall	Lecture	2002
Wilco	Music, Rock	2003
Yo La Tengo	Music, Rock	2003
Nickel Creek	Music, Bluegrass/Americana	2005
Glenn Kotche	Music, Jazz	2006
Nels Cline	Music, Jazz	2006
B.B. King	Music, Blues	2007
Wynton Marsalis	Music, Jazz	2008
Emmylou Harris	Music, Americana	2008
Boyz II Men	Music, Pop	2009
Jean-Luc Ponty	Music, Jazz	2009
David Sanborn	Music, Jazz	2010
Joe Lovano	Music, Jazz	2010
Sarah Chang	Music, Classical	2010
Marvin Hamlisch	Music, Classical	2010
Beach Boys	Music, Rock	2010
Chris Isaak	Music, Rock	2010
Nadja Salerno-Sonnenberg	Music, Classical	2010
Zoran Dukić	Music, Classical	2011
B-52's	Music, New-Wave	2011
Imelda May	Music, Rockabilly	2011
Pink Martini	Music, Pop-Rock	2011
Travis Porter	Music, Hip-Hop	2012
Natasha Paremski	Music, Classical	2012
Seth Meyers	Comedy	2012
Gabriel Iglesias	Comedy	2012
Andrew Bird	Music, Indie Rock	2012
Itzhak Perlman	Music, Classical	2012
Paul Galbraith	Music, Classical	2012
The Birdland Big Band	Music, Jazz	2012
Ron White	Comedy	2012
The Brian Setzer Orchestra	Music, Jazz	2012
David Sedaris	Lecture	2012
Joel McHale	Comedy	2013
Elena Kagan	Lecture	2013
Mayer Hawthorne	Music, Soul	2013
Arturo Sandoval	Music, Jazz	2013
Lynn Harrell	Music, Classical	2013
NEEDTOBREATHE	Music, Rock	2014
Lang Lang	Music, Classical	2014
Aziz Ansari	Comedy	2014
Morgan Freeman	Lecture	2014
Trombone Shorty	Music, Funk/Rock	2014
Dru Hill	Music, R&B	2014
Diego Garcia	Music, Bluegrass	2014
Branford Marsalis	Music, Jazz	2014
Jim Gaffigan	Comedy	2015
Beau Willimon	Lecture	2015
Joshua Bell	Music, Classical	2015
Bill Burr	Comedy	2015
Ben Rector	Music, Pop-Rock	2015
Sybarite5	Music, Classical	2015
John Prine	Music, Americana	2015
Nick Offerman	Comedy	2016
US Army Field Band & Soldiers Chorus	Music, Classical	2016
Joe Bonamassa	Music, Jazz	2016
Ariel String Quartet	Music, Classical	2017
David Russell	Music, Classical	2017
Gordon Lightfoot	Music, Folk	2017
Conrad Tao	Music, Classical	2017
Viola Davis	Lecture	2017
Brian Regan	Comedy	2018
Berlin Philharmonic Wind Quintet	Music, Classical	2019
