= David Roselle =

American mathematician and academic administrator (1939–2024)

25th President of University of Delaware
- In office 1990–2007
- Preceded by: Edward Arthur Trabant
- Succeeded by: Patrick T. Harker

9th President of University of Kentucky
- In office July 1, 1987 – December 28, 1989
- Preceded by: Otis A. Singletary
- Succeeded by: Charles T. Wethington Jr.

Personal details
- Born: David Paul Roselle; May 30, 1939 Vandergrift, Pennsylvania, U.S.
- Died: April 15, 2024 (aged 84)
- Spouse: Louise Dowling (m. 1967)
- Children: Arthur Roselle; Cynthia Koenig
- Relatives: Grandchildren: John Koenig (born 2002), Trevor Koenig (born 2001), Charles Roselle (born 1998), David Roselle (born 2000), Faye Roselle (born 2003) Sibling: William Roselle (brother) Sue Ellen Roselle (sister)
- Education: West Chester University (BA); Duke University (PhD)
- Occupation: Academic

David Paul Roselle (May 30, 1939 – April 15, 2024) was an American mathematician and academic administrator who served as the ninth president of the University of Kentucky and the 25th President of the University of Delaware.

== Early life and education ==
David Roselle was born in Vandergrift, Pennsylvania, near Pittsburgh, United States.

In 1961, Roselle received a bachelor's degree from West Chester State College (now West Chester University). He earned a Ph.D. in mathematics from Duke University in 1965.

Roselle specialized in number theory, combinatorics, and topics related to Euler functions.

== Early career ==
After earning his doctorate, Roselle joined the faculty of the University of Maryland, before taking a faculty position at Louisiana State University from 1968 to 1973. In 1974, at age 35, Roselle was granted tenure as a professor at Virginia Polytechnic Institute and State University.

At Virginia Tech, Roselle chaired the Commission on Graduate Studies, the Commission on Research, and the Commission on Undergraduate Studies. In 1978, he received Virginia Tech's Teaching Excellence Certificate.

Roselle was involved in education and mathematics outside of Virginia Tech. He joined the Mathematical Association of America and served as the organization's secretary from 1975 to 1984. He reviewed articles for peer-reviewed journals, including Mathematical Reviews. He was a member of the Society for Industrial and Applied Mathematics, the American Mathematical Society, and the National Council of Teachers of Mathematics, which presented him with its Certificate of Appreciation in 1984.

In 1976, Roselle's undergraduate Alma mater granted him its Distinguished Alumnus Award, and in 1994, it awarded him an honorary doctoral degree.

In 1979, at age 40, Roselle was appointed Dean of the Graduate School at Virginia Tech. In 1981, he was named Dean of Research and Graduate Studies, and in 1983, Roselle was appointed Provost of Virginia Tech.

As provost, Roselle worked to increase support for sponsored research, upgraded campus information systems, and ensured computing resources were available to students.

== President of the University of Kentucky ==
On July 1, 1987, David Roselle was appointed ninth president of the University of Kentucky.

Roselle's tenure as president of the University of Kentucky coincided with a 1988 scandal involving the men's basketball team. The NCAA alleged 17 violations, including allegations that basketball recruit Eric Manuel received help on the ACT and that another recruit, Chris Mills, received $1,000 from assistant coach Dwane Casey.

Roselle forced the resignation of head coach Eddie Sutton, replacing him with then-New York Knicks coach Rick Pitino, and forced the resignation of athletic director Cliff Hagan, replacing him with C. M. Newton. He launched an internal investigation, implemented new policies to increase oversight of the athletic department, and cooperated with NCAA investigators. Commentators credited these actions with keeping the basketball team from being disbanded for two seasons, even though the NCAA Committee on Infractions had initially recommended it. Roselle also created the role of Vice President for Information Systems.

After stepping down as president, he was awarded the Distinguished Service Award by the University of Kentucky National Alumni Association. On October 25, 2011, the Board of Trustees of the University of Kentucky approved renaming the "New North Hall," a 144-bed residence building, as the "David P. Roselle Hall".

== President of the University of Delaware ==
Following the basketball scandal and proposed budget cuts by the Kentucky Legislature, Roselle left the University of Kentucky to accept a post as president of the University of Delaware. He was unanimously elected the university's 25th president by the board of trustees and began his term on May 1, 1990. He was the highest-paid public university president in the nation, making $874,687 annually.

During Roselle's tenure, the university focused on fiscal discipline. He cut the university's annual budget by $32 million and eliminated the school's $8 million annual deficit through privatizing services and other cost-cutting measures. The university's endowment more than tripled from $362 million when he took office in 1990, to over $1.4 billion in 2006.

During his tenure, several campus buildings were renovated and new ones were constructed, including a student center named after former University President Edward A. Trabant, the Charles C. Allen Jr. Laboratory, MBNA America Hall (now Alfred Lerner Hall), Gore Hall, and the Louise and David Roselle Center For the Arts, named in honor of Roselle and his wife. The renovations and new construction were part of a campus remodeling project that included brick walkways, ivy wall coverings, and trees.

Roselle also focused on student access to technology. Shortly after becoming president, every classroom, residence hall, and office was wired to the campus computer network.

In addition to his role as university president, he served on the boards of Winterthur Museum, the Wilmington Grand Opera House, Blue Cross/Blue Shield of Delaware, and the Wilmington Trust Company. He was also a member of the boards of OCLC, Brown Advisory, and SOKA University. In 2005, Roselle and Robert Carothers were the first recipients of the American Council on Education's Fellows Mentor Award.

He had planned to resign on May 1, 2007, marking exactly 17 years since he began his term. However, he stayed on until July 1, 2007, when Patrick T. Harker, the former dean of the Wharton School, took over.

On June 1, 2008, Roselle began serving as interim director of the Winterthur Museum, Garden and Country Estate, and was later named Winterthur's director in November.

In 2012, Delaware Today named Roselle as one of "The 50 Most Influential Delawareans in the Past 50 Years," citing improvements at the University of Delaware during his tenure.

== Personal life ==
Roselle married Louise Dowling from Manhasset, New York, in 1967, and they had two children. Roselle died on April 15, 2024, at the age of 84.

Preceded by John D. Wilson	Provost of Virginia Polytechnic Institute and State University; 1983–1987	Succeeded by ?
Preceded by Otis A. Singletary	President of the University of Kentucky; 1987–1989	Succeeded by Charles T. Wethington Jr.
Preceded by Edward Arthur Trabant	President of the University of Delaware; 1990–2007	Succeeded by Patrick T. Harker
