= Frank L. McVey =

American academic administrator

Frank McVey
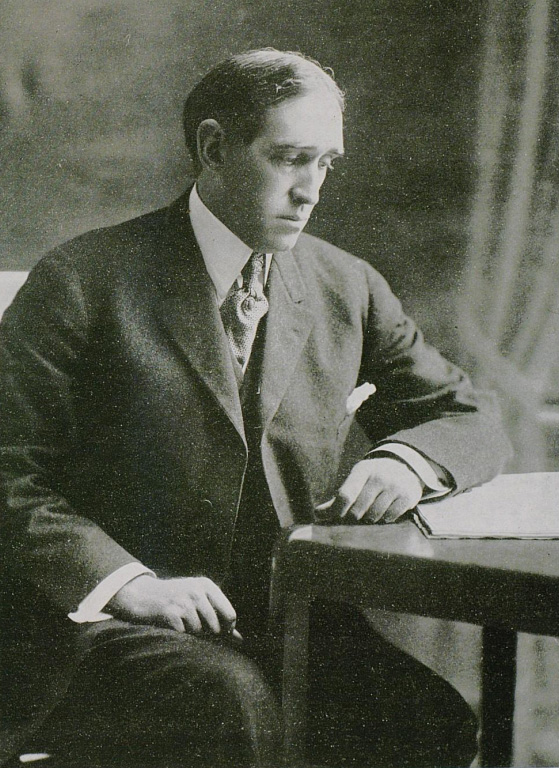

3rd President of the University of Kentucky
- In office 1917–1940
- Preceded by: Henry Stites Barker
- Succeeded by: Herman Lee Donovan

4th President of the University of North Dakota
- In office 1909–1917

Personal details
- Born: Frank LeRond McVey; November 10, 1869 Wilmington, Ohio, U.S.
- Died: January 4, 1953 (aged 83) Fayette County, Kentucky, U.S.
- Education: Ohio Wesleyan University (BA); Yale University (PhD)

Frank LeRond McVey (November 10, 1869 – January 4, 1953) was an American economist, educator and academic administrator. He served as the fourth president of the University of North Dakota from 1909 to 1917 and the third president of the University of Kentucky from 1917 to 1940.

== Early life and education ==
An industrious man is McVey
He labors so hard night and day
Writing books, meeting classes,
Uplifting the masses,
We feel he will soon pass away.

— Limerick caricaturing McVey's
ambition and energy from
the University of Minnesota yearbook

McVey was born in Wilmington, Ohio in 1869. He received his B.A. from Ohio Wesleyan University and his Ph.D. in Economics from Yale University in 1895.

== Career ==
McVey taught at Horace Mann School in New York City, Teachers College at Columbia University, and the University of Minnesota, where he rose from instructor to tenured professor in his 11 years at the university's Department of Economics. In 1907, he was appointed chairman of the Minnesota Tax Commission by Governor John Albert Johnson.

=== President of the University of North Dakota ===
At the age of 39, McVey became the youngest President of the University of North Dakota in 1909. McVey Hall, a residence hall at UND, was later named in his honor.

=== President of the University of Kentucky ===
In 1917, McVey became the President of the University of Kentucky. During his tenure, several important campus buildings were constructed, including the university's Memorial Hall, the Margaret I. King Library, the Alumni Gymnasium, and an academic building that now bears his name, McVey Hall.

In 1923 he married the Dean of Women, Frances Jewell McVey.

McVey retired in 1940 and continued to live in Lexington until his death in 1953.

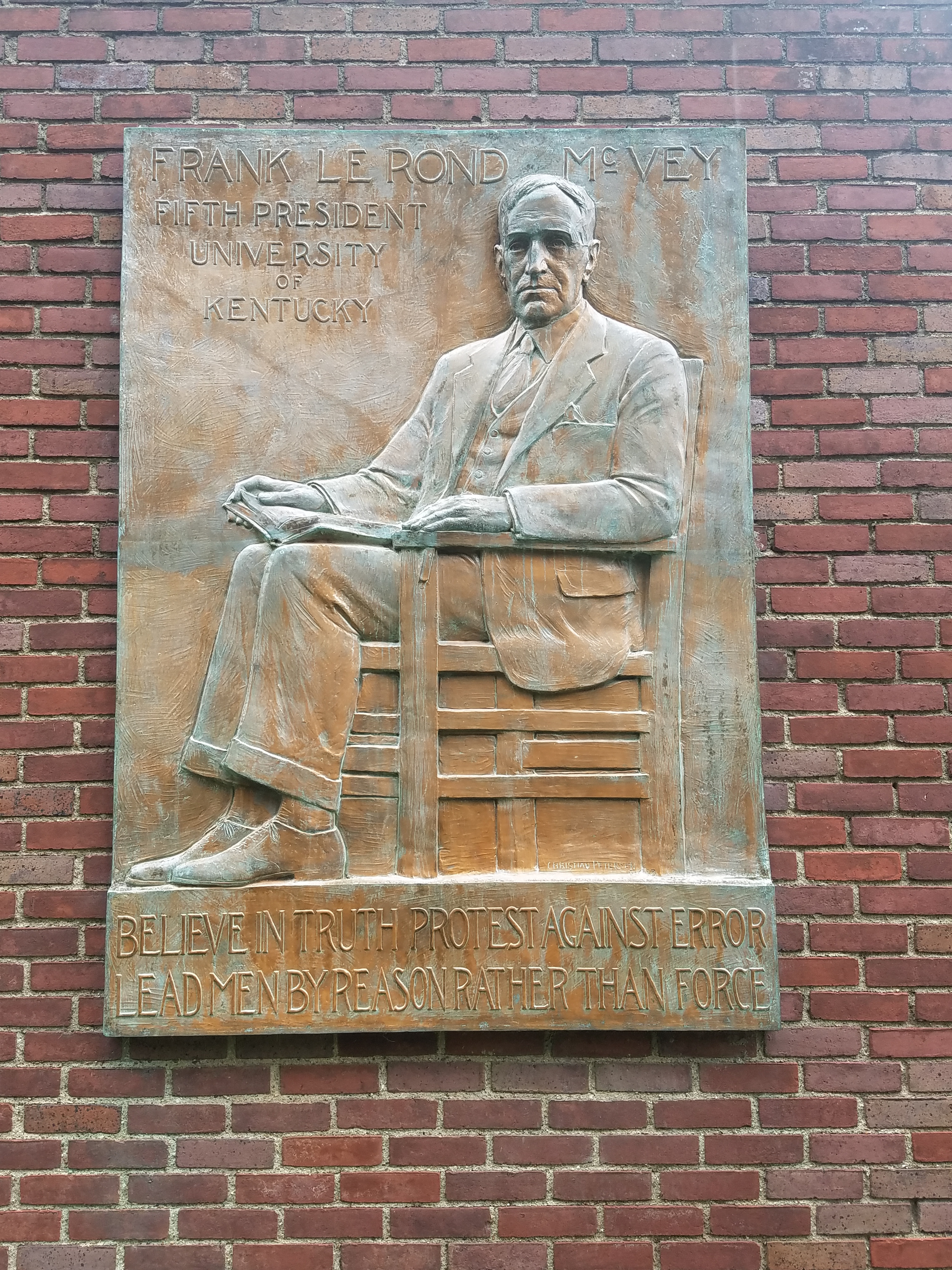
Photo of Frank Lerond McVey Plaque, University of Kentucky, taken in 2020

Preceded by Webster Merrifield	President of the University of North Dakota; January 1909 – 1917	Succeeded by Earl Babcock Acting
