= University of Kentucky HealthCare =

Health care system at the University of Kentucky

Coordinates: 38.0312°N 84.5074°W

- Type: Nonprofit
- Industry: Health care
- Founded: 1957
- Headquarters: 800 Rose Street; Lexington, Kentucky,
- Area served: Kentucky
- Website: ukhealthcare.uky.edu

The University of Kentucky HealthCare, branded as UK HealthCare, is the health care system of the University of Kentucky in Lexington, Kentucky, United States. It comprises the university's hospitals, clinics, outreach locations, and patient care services, along with the university's health profession colleges.

== Colleges ==
- College of Dentistry
- College of Health Sciences
- College of Medicine
- College of Nursing
- College of Pharmacy
- College of Public Health

== Hospitals ==
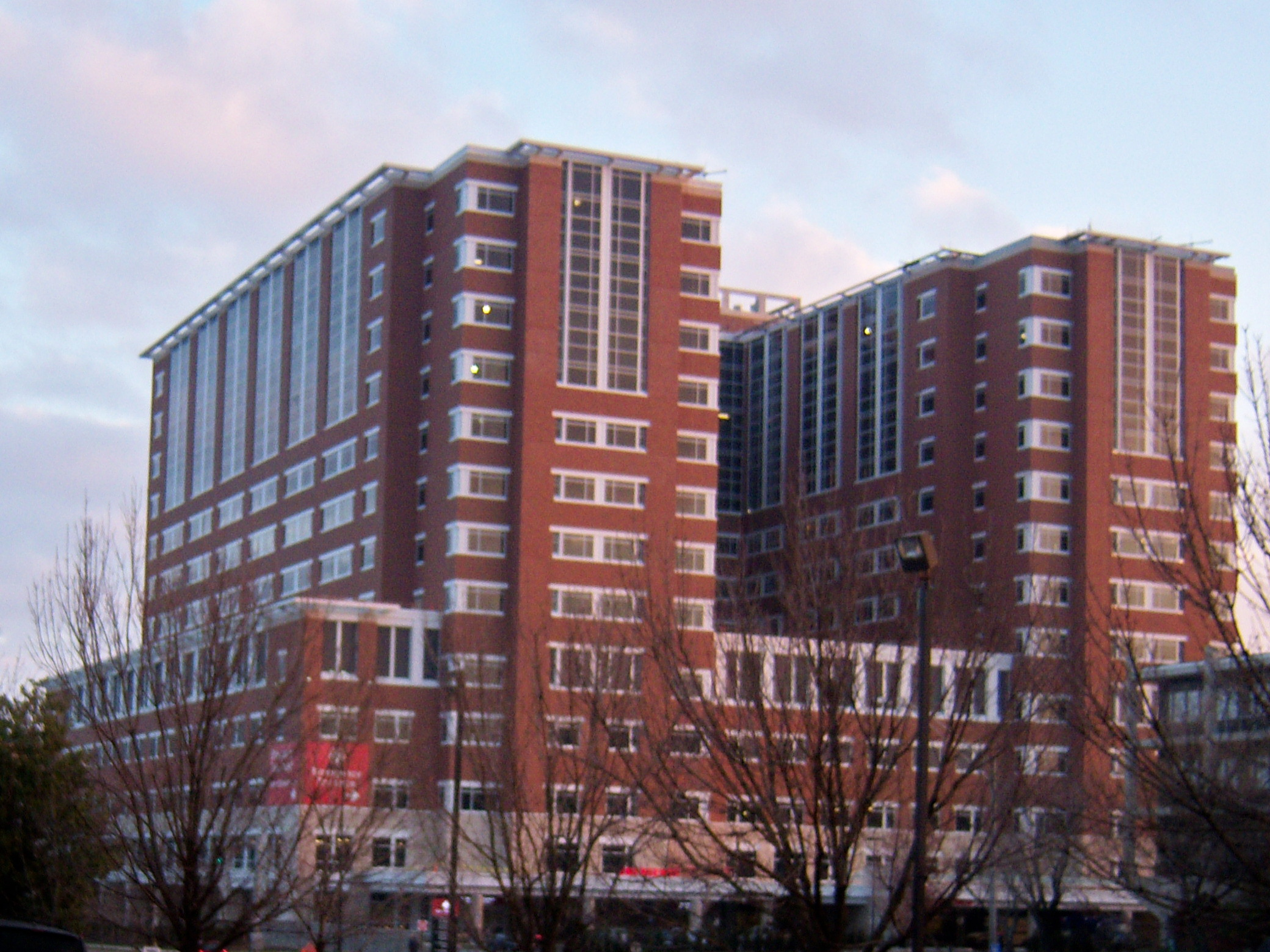
Albert B. Chandler Hospital

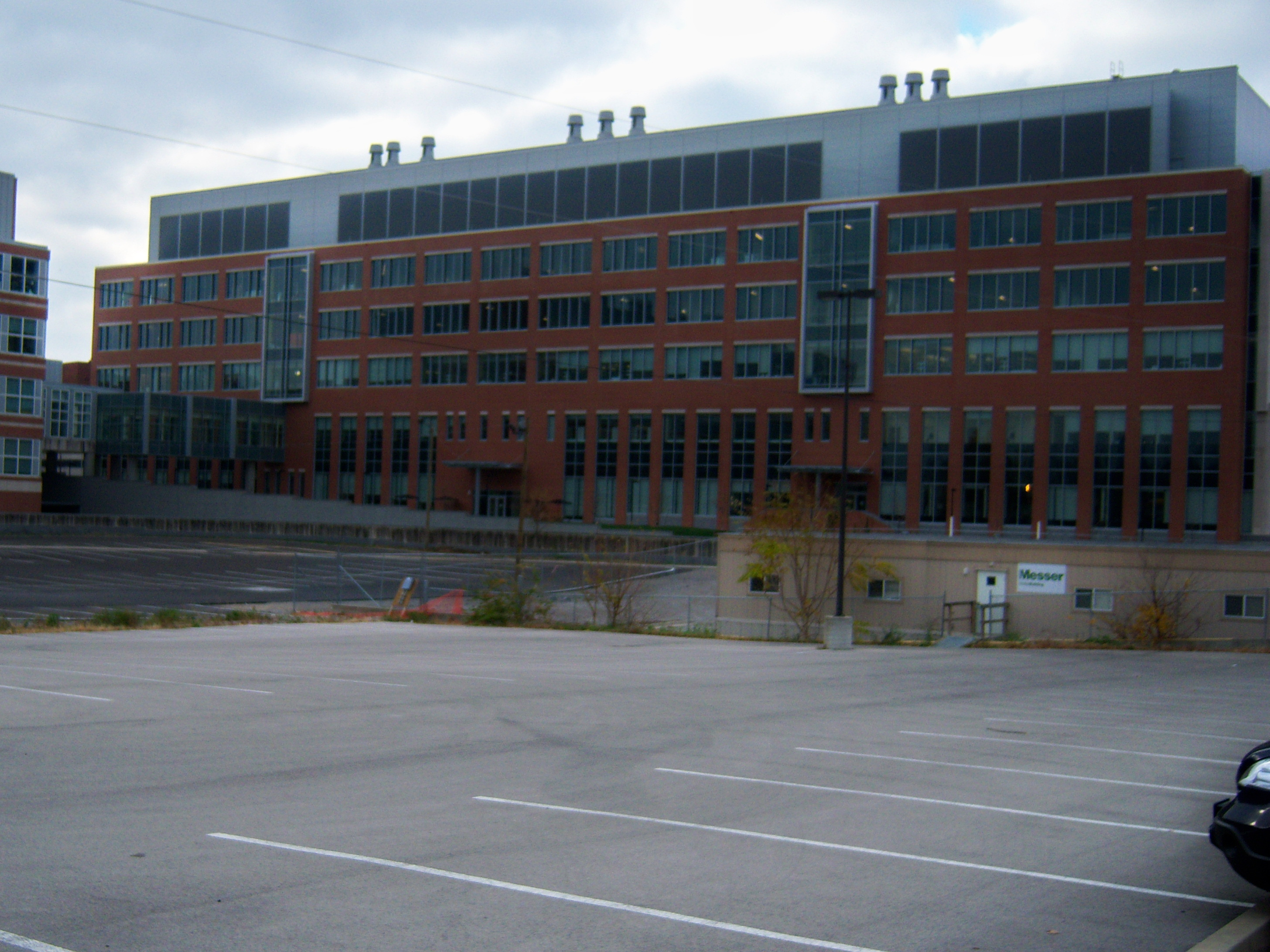
Biological-Pharmaceutical Building

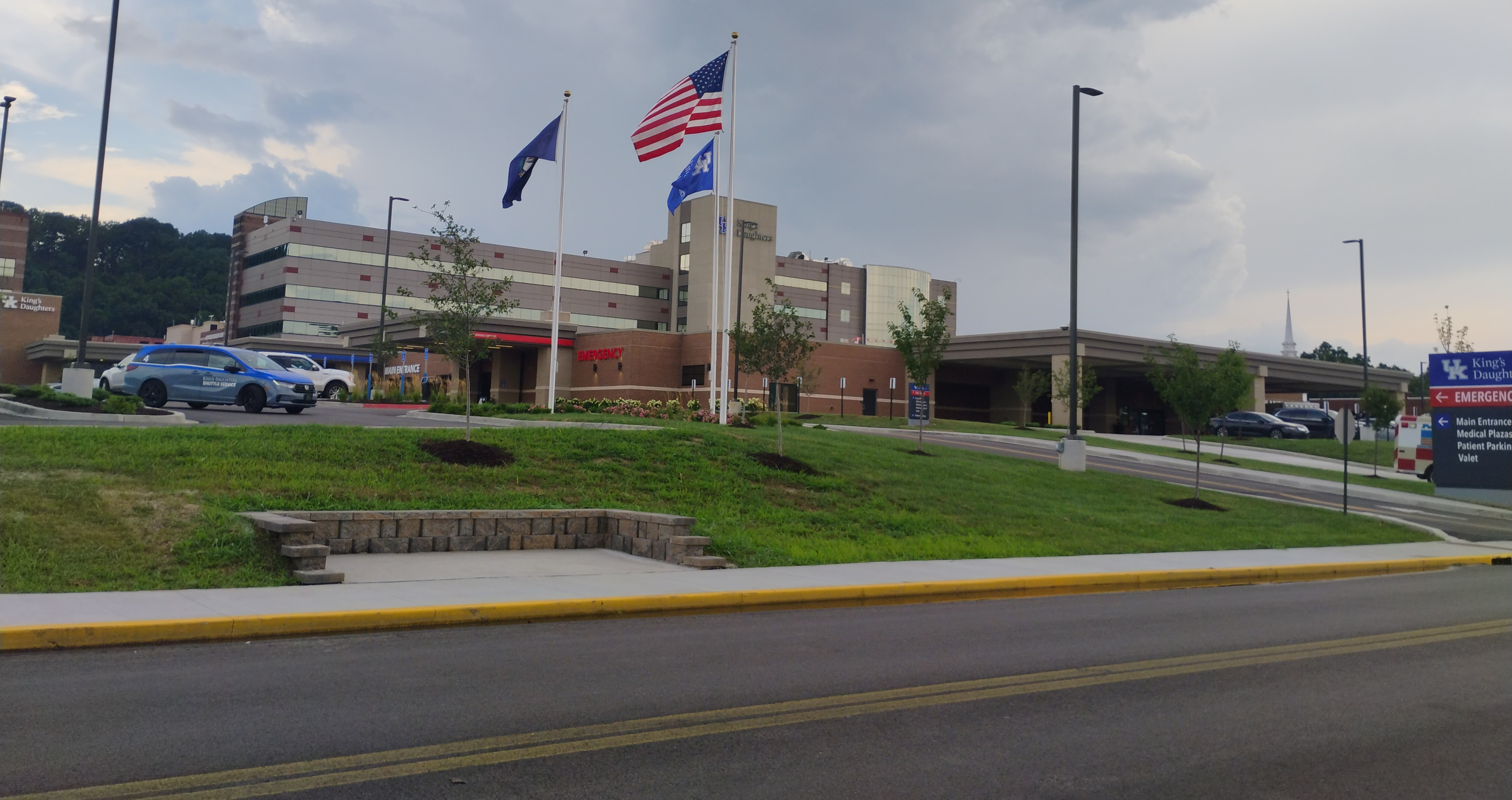
King's Daughters Medical Center

- Albert B. Chandler Hospital: The 945 bed on-campus medical facility is UK HealthCare's flagship facility and includes numerous components to the University of Kentucky medical system. A new patient care facility is currently under construction.
- Eastern State Hospital: This 239 bed psychiatric hospital is owned by the Commonwealth of Kentucky and operated by UK HealthCare since 2014 under a $43 million contract with the Kentucky Cabinet for Health and Family Services.
- Golisano Children's at UK
- Good Samaritan Hospital: A 180-bed medical facility adjacent to campus that was purchased by the University of Kentucky in 2007. In June 2023, the university announced that all Good Samaritan services will be moved to the expanded Albert B. Chandler Hospital campus by 2029 with the Good Samaritan facility being closed at that time.
- King's Daughters Medical Center: A 465-bed medical facility in Ashland that was purchased by the University of Kentucky in December 2022.
  - King's Daughters Medical Center Ohio: A 10-bed medical facility in Portsmouth, Ohio that was purchased along with King's Daughters Medical Center in December 2022.
- St. Claire Regional Medical Center: A 139-bed medical facility in Morehead that was purchased by the University of Kentucky in July 2024.

== Clinics and centers ==
- Student Health Facility: This building houses University Health Services.
- Center for Advanced Surgery
- Centers of Excellence: This includes the Centers for Rural Health, Critical Care Centers, the Sanders-Brown Center on Aging among numerous other units.
- Gill Heart Institute: This houses clinics, diagnostic areas, six Cath and EP laboratories and numerous offices. It is the home of the University of Kentucky Hospital Center for Advanced Surgery.
- Kentucky Clinic
- Kentucky Neuroscience Institute
- Markey Cancer Center

== Academic buildings ==
- Biomedical Biological Science Research Building: This features workstations for laboratory technical staffing, offices, animal care areas, central autoclave facilities, centrifuge rooms, cold rooms and tissue and cell culture facilities for the College of Medicine, College of Pharmacy, and College of Arts and Sciences.
- Charles T. Wethington Jr. Building: This features numerous classrooms, offices and teaching laboratories for the College of Health Sciences.
- Biological Pharmaceutical Complex Building: This building has housed the College of Pharmacy since 2010.
