= Eastern State Hospital =

Eastern State Hospital may refer to:

- Eastern State Hospital (Kentucky)
- Eastern State Hospital, in Vinita, Oklahoma
- Eastern State Hospital, in Bearden, Knoxville, Tennessee
- Eastern State Hospital (Virginia)
- Eastern State Hospital (Washington)
- The Illinois Eastern State Hospital for the Insane, later Kankakee State Hospital, Illinois
