= Ronald Werner-Wilson =

Ronald Jay Werner-Wilson (born 1962), Chair of the Family Studies Department and Kathryn Louise Chellgren Endowed Professor for Research in Family Studies at the University of Kentucky, is a scholar who has held faculty appointments since 1993. His has published one book, book chapters, and numerous peer-reviewed journal articles. He has investigated family and relationship influences on adolescent and young adult sexuality, positive youth development, therapy with adolescents, gender and power influences on therapeutic process, and physiological influences on family interaction.

== Education ==
Werner-Wilson earned his Ph.D. in Marriage and Family Therapy from the Department of Child and Family Development at The University of Georgia in 1993. His dissertation, directed by Sharon Price, was entitled The Differential Treatment of Men and Women in Marriage and Family Therapy.

He earned an M.A. in Sociology in 1990 from the Department of Sociology at Georgia State University. His thesis project, directed by Paula Dressel, was entitled Are the Times A'Changin'? A Content Analysis of Rolling Stone Magazine, 1968 and 1988.

He earned a B.S. degree in 1988 from the Department of Psychology at Georgia State University.

== Professional experience ==
Werner-Wilson is Chair of the Family Studies Department and Kathryn Louise Chellgren Endowed Professor for Research in Family Studies at the University of Kentucky. He joined the faculty in August 2007.

Prior to joining the University of Kentucky faculty, Werner-Wilson was an Assistant Professor (1998–2003), Associate Professor (2003–2007), and Director of the Marriage and Family Therapy Program (1999–2007) and Clinic (2000–2007) in the Department of Human Development and Family Studies at Iowa State University.

Assistant Professor and Director of the Marriage and Family Therapy Clinic in the Department of Human Development and Family Studies at Colorado State University from 1995 to 1998.

Assistant Professor in the Department of Family and Consumer Sciences at Western Michigan University from 1993 to 1995.

== Publications ==
=== Published books and book chapters ===
- Werner-Wilson, R. J. (2001). Developmental-Systemic Family Therapy with Adolescents. Binghamton, NY: Haworth Press. ISBN 978-0-7890-1205-0.
- Werner-Wilson, Ronald Jay; Morrissey, Kathleen M. (2007). "Understanding Treatment: Principles and Approaches". In Gullotta, Thomas P.; Adams, Gerald R. (eds.). Handbook of Adolescent Behavioral Problems: Evidence-Based Approaches to Prevention and Treatment. Springer Science & Business Media. pp. 79–100. ISBN 978-0-387-23846-3.

=== Published journal articles ===
- Chapman, Erin N.; Werner-Wilson, Ronald Jay (22 September 2008). "Does positive youth development predict adolescent attitudes about sexuality?". Adolescence. 43 (171): 505–524. PMID 19086667. Gale A189872328 ProQuest 195947390.
- Turner, Lue Kirsten; Werner-Wilson, Ronald Jay (27 August 2008). "Phenomenological Experience of Girls in a Single-Sex Day Treatment Group". Journal of Feminist Family Therapy. 20 (3): 220–250. doi:10.1080/08952830802264532. S2CID 144736263.
- Vogel, David L.; Werner-Wilson, Ronald J.; Liang, Kun; Cutrona, Carolyn E.; Seeman, Joann C.; Hackler, Ashley H. (20 June 2008). "The Relationship of Physiological Arousal with Demand and Withdraw Behavior: Examining the Accuracy of the Escape-Conditioning Hypothesis". Sex Roles. 59 (11): 871. doi:10.1007/s11199-008-9490-7. S2CID 143825044.
- Vogel, David L.; Murphy, Megan J.; Werner-Wilson, Ronald J.; Cutrona, Carolyn E.; Seeman, Joann (2007). "Sex differences in the use of demand and withdraw behavior in marriage: Examining the social structure hypothesis". Journal of Counseling Psychology. 54 (2): 165–177. doi:10.1037/0022-0167.54.2.165.
- Murphy, Megan J.; Cheng, Wan-Juo; Werner-Wilson, Ronald J. (1 December 2006). "Exploring Master Therapists' Use of Power in Conversation". Contemporary Family Therapy. 28 (4): 475–484. doi:10.1007/s10591-006-9016-9. S2CID 9914236.
- Morrissey, Kathleen M.; Werner-Wilson, Ronald Jay (22 March 2005). "The relationship between out-of-school activities and positive youth development: an investigation of the influences of communities and family". Adolescence. 40 (157): 67–86. PMID 15861618. Gale A131363628.
- Thomas, Sarah Elizabeth Gellhaus; Werner-Wilson, Ronald Jay; Murphy, Megan J. (1 March 2005). "Influence of Therapist and Client Behaviors on Therapy Alliance". Contemporary Family Therapy. 27 (1): 19–35. doi:10.1007/s10591-004-1968-z. S2CID 144364310.
- Fitzharris, Jennifer Lynn; Werner-Wilson, Ronald Jay (July 2004). "Multiple Perspectives of Parent-Adolescent Sexuality Communication: Phenomenological Description of a Rashoman Effect". The American Journal of Family Therapy. 32 (4): 273–288. doi:10.1080/01926180490437367. S2CID 144569436.
- Werner-Wilson, Ronald Jay; Fitzharris, Jennifer Lynn; Morrissey, Kathleen M. (22 June 2004). "Adolescent and parent perceptions of media influence on adolescent sexuality". Adolescence. 39 (154): 303–314. PMID 15563040. Gale A124698510 ProQuest 195935602.
- Werner-Wilson, Ronald Jay; Murphy, Megan J.; Fitzharris, Jennifer Lynn (22 November 2004). "Does Therapist Experience Influence Interruptions of Women Clients?". Journal of Feminist Family Therapy. 16 (1): 39–49. doi:10.1300/J086v16n01_03. S2CID 144102768.
- Werner-Wilson, Ronald Jay; Davenport, Becky R. (1 June 2003). "Distinguishing Between Conceptualizations of Attachment: Clinical Implications in Marriage and Family Therapy". Contemporary Family Therapy. 25 (2): 179–193. doi:10.1023/A:1023620117087. S2CID 141116012.
- Werner-Wilson, Ronald Jay; Davenport, Becky R. (1 March 2003). "Theoretical Purity Versus Theoretical Layering in Marriage and Family Therapy". Contemporary Family Therapy. 25 (1): 77–88. doi:10.1023/A:1022510105582. S2CID 141012113.
- Werner-Wilson, Ronald Jay; Michaels, Marcia L.; Thomas, Sarah Gellhaus; Thiesen, Angela M. (1 December 2003). "Influence of Therapist Behaviors on Therapeutic Alliance". Contemporary Family Therapy. 25 (4): 381–390. doi:10.1023/A:1027356602191. S2CID 141187657.
- Holm, Kristen E.; Werner-Wilson, Ronald J.; Cook, Alicia S.; Berger, Peggy S. (May 2001). "The Association Between Emotion Work Balance and Relationship Satisfaction of Couples Seeking Therapy". The American Journal of Family Therapy. 29 (3): 193–205. doi:10.1080/019261801750424316. S2CID 144419157.
- Werner-Wilson, Ronald Jay (1 June 2001). "Experiential Exercises in MFT Training: Gender, Power, and Diversity". Contemporary Family Therapy. 23 (2): 221–229. doi:10.1023/A:1011102420118. S2CID 145469116.
- Werner-Wilson, Ronald Jay; Fitzharris, Jennifer Lynn (21 May 2001). "How Can Mothers and Fathers Become Involved in the Sexuality Education of Adolescents?". Journal of HIV/AIDS Prevention & Education for Adolescents & Children. 4 (1): 49–59. doi:10.1300/J129v04n01_05.
- Bernstein, Jeffrey; Zimmerman, Toni Schindler; Werner-Wilson, Ronald Jay; Vosburg, Jill (June 2000). "Preschool Children's Classification Skills and a Multicultural Education Intervention To Promote Acceptance of Ethnic Diversity". Journal of Research in Childhood Education. 14 (2): 181–192. doi:10.1080/02568540009594762. S2CID 143765693.
- Bowling, Stephanie Weiland; Werner-Wilson, Ronald J. (December 2000). "Father-Daughter Relationships and Adolescent Female Sexuality: Paternal Qualities Associated with Responsible Sexual Behavior". Journal of HIV/AIDS Prevention & Education for Adolescents & Children. 3 (4): 5–28. doi:10.1300/J129v03n04_02.
- Higgins Kessler, Mindi R.; Werner-Wilson, Ronald Jay; Cook, Alicia Skinner; Berger, Peggy (July 2000). "Emotion Management of Marriage and Family Therapists: How is it Different for Women and Men?". The American Journal of Family Therapy. 28 (3): 243–253. doi:10.1080/01926180050081676. S2CID 143234686.
- Werner-Wilson, Ronald Jay; Arbel, Osnat (July 2000). "Assessment of Interpersonal Influences on Adolescents: The Parent and Peer Influence Scale". The American Journal of Family Therapy. 28 (3): 265–274. doi:10.1080/01926180050081694. S2CID 145301524.
- Werner-Wilson, Ronald Jay; Zimmerman, Toni Schindler; Whalen, Dorothy (1 June 2000). "Resilient Response to Battering". Contemporary Family Therapy. 22 (2): 161–188. doi:10.1023/A:1007777702757. S2CID 140397300.
- Werner-Wilson, Ronald Jay; Zimmerman, Toni Schindler; Daniels, Kathrine; Bowling, Stephanie M. (1 December 1999). "Is Therapeutic Alliance Influenced by a Feminist Approach to Therapy?". Contemporary Family Therapy. 21 (4): 545–550. doi:10.1023/A:1021631406474. S2CID 146768827.
- Werner-Wilson, Ronald Jay; Zimmerman, Toni Schindler; Price, Sharon J. (1999). "Are Goals and Topics Influenced by Gender and Modality in the Initial Marriage and Family Therapy Session?". Journal of Marital and Family Therapy. 25 (2): 253–262. doi:10.1111/j.1752-0606.1999.tb01126.x. PMID 10319296.
- Werner-Wilson, Ronald Jay (19 May 1999). "Are Virgins at Risk for Contracting HIV/AIDS?". Journal of HIV/AIDS Prevention & Education for Adolescents & Children. 2 (3–4): 63–71. doi:10.1300/J129v02n03_05.
- Werner-Wilson, Ronald Jay (22 September 1998). "Gender differences in adolescent sexual attitudes: the influence of individual and family factors". Adolescence. 33 (131): 519–520. PMID 9831869. Gale A53368567 ProQuest 195927472.
- Werner-Wilson, Ronald Jay; Vosburg, Jill (14 September 1998). "How Do Contextual Factors and Gender Differences Influence College Students' Safer Sex Practices?". Journal of HIV/AIDS Prevention & Education for Adolescents & Children. 2 (2): 33–49. doi:10.1300/J129v02n02_03.
- Werner-Wilson, Ronald Jay; Wahler, Jim; Kreutzer, Jill (19 May 1999). "Independent and Dependent Variables in Adolescent and Young Adult Sexuality Research: Conceptual and Operational Difficulties". Journal of HIV/AIDS Prevention & Education for Adolescents & Children. 2 (3–4): 129–144. doi:10.1300/J129v02n03_09.
- Carr, Alison A.; Wilson, Ron (1997). "A Model of Parental Participation: A Secondary Data Analysis" (PDF). School Community Journal. 7 (2): 9–25.
- Werner-Wilson, Ronald Jay (11 June 1997). "Is Therapeutic Alliance Influenced by Gender in Marriage and Family Therapy?". Journal of Feminist Family Therapy. 9 (1): 3–16. doi:10.1300/J086v09n01_02.
- Werner-Wilson, Ronald Jay; Price, Sharon J.; Zimmerman, Toni S.; Murphy, Megan J. (September 1997). "Client gender as a process variable in marriage and family therapy: Are women clients interrupted more than men clients?". Journal of Family Psychology. 11 (3): 373–377. doi:10.1037/0893-3200.11.3.373.
- Villarruel, Francisco A.; Gonzalez-Kruger, Gloria; Perkins, Daniel F.; Wilson, Ronald J.; Youatt, June Pierce; Kostelnik, Marjorie J.; Pace, Karen (1995). "1994: Twenty-Sixth Annual National Council on Family Relations Media Awards Competition". Family Relations. 44 (1): 110–115. doi:10.2307/584748. JSTOR 584748. ProQuest 213936419.
- LaRossa, Ralph; Gordon, Betty; Wilson, Ronald; Bairan, Annette; Jaret, Charles (1 November 1991). "The Fluctuating Image of the 20th Century American Father". Journal of Marriage and Family. 53 (4): 987–997. doi:10.2307/353002. JSTOR 353002.
