= Biomedical Biological Science Research Building (University of Kentucky) =

US research facility

Coordinates: 38.0347°N 84.5090°W

The Biomedical Biological Science Research Building (BBSRB) is a five-story research facility for the University of Kentucky in Lexington, Kentucky. It is located at the corner of Virginia Avenue and South Limestone.

The BBSRB was designed by famed architects and urban planners Robert Venturi and Denise Scott Brown of Venturi, Scott Brown and Associates with A. M. Kinney and HERA. It is the first of a series of buildings in a comprehensive plan the firms developed for the university's healthcare "precinct" in the area near the intersection of Virginia Avenue and South Limestone Street.

Work began on the new $72,978,900 research facility in August 2002 with an original projected terminus date of October 2004, however, it did not open until April 2005 and is expected to be an integral part of the university's new research campus. The construction of the 185,000 sq ft (17,200 m^{2}) building also featured the completion of a new central utility plant and electrical substation.

== Current ==
It features workstations for laboratory technical staffing, offices, animal care areas, central autoclave facilities, centrifuge rooms, cold rooms and tissue and cell culture facilities for the College of Medicine, College of Pharmacy, and College of Arts and Sciences. Over 400 faculty, staff and students report to the College of Medicine's Department of Molecular and Cellular Biochemistry, the Institute of Molecular Medicine, the Spinal Cord and Brain Injury Research Center and the Drug Abuse Treatment Research Program.

== Future ==
A cafe is planned along the pedestrian bridge that links the Chandler Medical Center, BBSRB and future development.

== See also ==
- Buildings at the University of Kentucky
- Cityscape of Lexington, Kentucky
- University of Kentucky
