= Biological Pharmaceutical Complex Building (University of Kentucky) =

Building at the University of Kentucky

Coordinates: 38.0339°N 84.5099°W

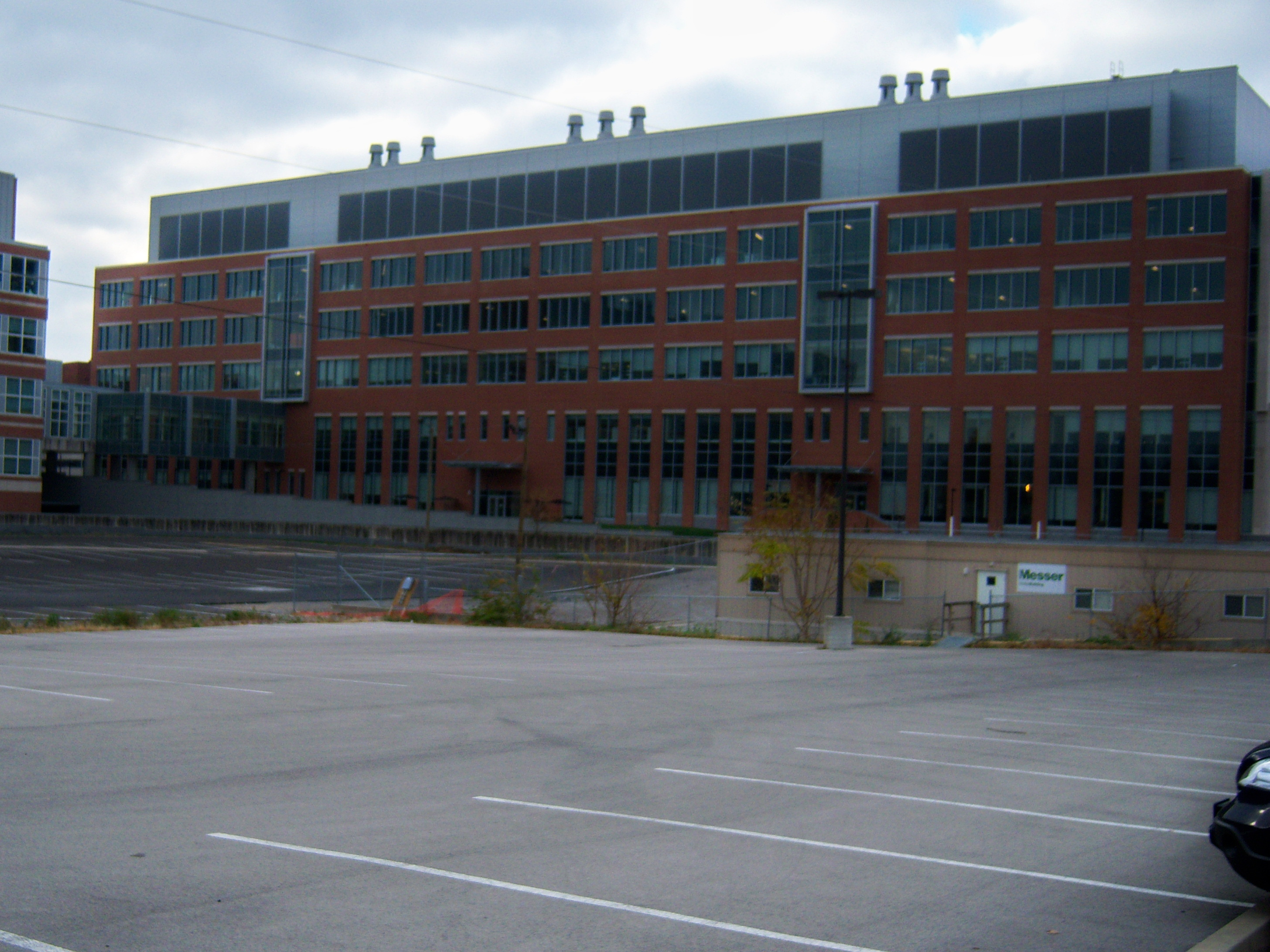
A 2010 photograph of the 280,000 sq ft (26,000 m^{2}). Biological Pharmaceutical Complex.

The Biological Pharmaceutical Complex Building, later renamed to the Lee T. Todd Jr. Building, is a five-story building on the University of Kentucky campus on South Limestone adjacent to the Biomedical Biological Science Research Building that was dedicated on January 25, 2010. The building allowed the College of Pharmacy to relocate from its former location along Rose Street. In addition, the college faculty members were able to relocate from ten existing structures on and off campus to one central location.

In 2005, the Kentucky General Assembly appropriated $40 million to fund planning for the new facility. One year later, they willed the remainder of the requested $120 million that was expected in costs. Groundbreaking on the complex occurred on April 13, 2007 and construction began in May. Leader Avenue, which runs adjacent to the building, was closed. The cost of the new structure was at $134 million. The new College of Pharmacy Building became the largest academic building at Kentucky at 280,000 sq ft (26,000 m^{2}), and one of the largest in the nation.

The complex is divided up with two floors of academic spaces and three floors of research laboratories, notably the Markey Cancer Center research facility. There is also a full basement with additional research facilities, and a penthouse for mechanical operations. The academic spaces include two 235-seat lecture halls on the ground floor, one 110-seat classroom, one 54-seat classroom, and a teaching laboratory complex on the second floor. The laboratory complex features a non-sterile compounding laboratory, sterile compounding laboratory, community pharmacy mock-up, and standardized patient assessment rooms. In addition, nineteen small group learning rooms are present throughout the complex. It also features research facilities and a five-story atrium.

In late 2016, the name of the complex was official changed to the Lee T. Todd Jr. Building, named after the president of the University of Kentucky from 2001 through 2011. In addition, the building is linked with the Albert B. Chandler Medical Center and the surrounding complex via a walkway over South Limestone, where many student pharmacists perform experiential fieldwork.

== See also ==
- Buildings at the University of Kentucky
- Cityscape of Lexington, Kentucky
- University of Kentucky
