= Kelsey Ladt =

American biologist

Kelsey Curd Ladt is the youngest person to ever graduate from the University of Kentucky. She graduated summa cum laude in the spring of 2009 with a degree in biology, and is considered by many to be a child prodigy. At 13, Kelsey was probably the youngest NIH researcher ever.
