= University of Kentucky College of Nursing =

Nursing University in Lexington, KY

- Type: Public
- Established: 1960
- Dean: Janie Heath PhD, APRN-BC FAAN, FAANP
- Location: Lexington, KY, USA; 38.0328°N 84.5077°W
- Website: nursing.uky.edu

The University of Kentucky College of Nursing is the nursing school of the University of Kentucky in Lexington, Kentucky, United States. It is part of the University of Kentucky HealthCare.

It is located at 751 Rose Street Lexington, KY. There are 1,589 students enrolled in the College of Nursing with many faculty/staff members. They offer a Baccalaureate Degree Program in Nursing, Master's Degree Program in Nursing, Doctor of Nursing Practice Degree Program and the Post-Graduate APRN Certificate Program at the University of Kentucky College of Nursing.

== History ==
Dr. William R. Willard was the founder of the Albert B. Chandler Medical Center and dean of the College of Medicine at UK. Nurses were in short supply so he proposed the idea of the nursing program for high school graduates and for registered nurses. In May 1960, the college enrolls 35 women who make up the first class and the first class to graduate in 1964. They began to add more and more programs to the college throughout the following years. In 2010, the college celebrated its 50th anniversary. In 2014, Dr. Janie Heath is appointed as the fifth dean and remains the dean until today.

== Academic programs ==
=== Undergraduate ===
- Academic Advising
- Traditional BSN
- Accelerated BSN
- RN-BSN
- Internships and Clinical Opportunities
- Information Sessions and Tours

=== Graduate ===
- Master of Science in Nursing
- Doctor of Nursing Practice
- PhD in Nursing
- Postgraduate APRN Certificate
- Tobacco Treatment Specialist Graduate Certificate

=== Professional Development ===
- Continuing Education
- Live Events
- Web Courses
- Courses for College Credit
- State Registered Nurse Aid
