= W4JP =

Callsign of amateur radio station

Coordinates: 38°02′14.50″N 84°30′20″W

W4JP is the callsign of the amateur radio station operated by the University of Kentucky Amateur Radio Club in room 553 of Anderson Hall (Kentucky). The club traces its history back to 1915. In 1927, the station was relicensed as 9JL (later W9JL).

In the 2000s, the UK Amateur Radio Club and the SSL (Space Systems Laboratory) university groups merged. They kept both names, but have acted mostly under the Space Systems Laboratory.
