= Eastern State Hospital (Kentucky) =

- UK HealthCare

Geography
- Location: 1350 Bull Lea Road, Lexington, Kentucky, United States
- Coordinates: 38°04′57.0″N 84°29′52.6″W

Organization
- Type: Specialist

Services
- Beds: 239
- Speciality: Mental Health

History
- Founded: 1817

Links
- Website: ukhealthcare.uky.edu
- Lists: Hospitals in Kentucky

Eastern State Hospital, located in Lexington, Kentucky, is the second oldest psychiatric hospital in the United States. It operates today as a psychiatric hospital with 239 beds providing inpatient care. Eastern State Hospital is owned by the Commonwealth of Kentucky, operated by the University of Kentucky's UK HealthCare and falls under the jurisdiction of the Cabinet for Health and Family Services.

== History ==
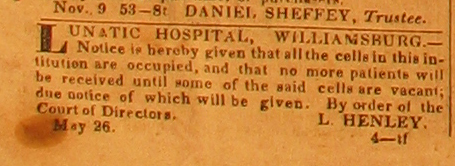
Article from the Richmond Enquirer, Nov 30, 1830

From 1792 until 1824, the mentally troubled residents of Kentucky were boarded out with individuals at public expense. A few were sent to Eastern State Hospital at Williamsburg, Virginia. In 1816, a group of public-spirited citizens in Lexington, banded together to establish a hospital called the Fayette Hospital. It was established to help the poor, disabled and "lunatic" members of society. A building's construction was initiated, and in 1817 Henry Clay gave an oration at the dedicatory ceremony; however, the building was never finished or occupied. On December 7, 1822, the General Assembly of the Commonwealth of Kentucky passed the Act to Establish a Lunatic Asylum. Ten acres of land, along with the unfinished building of the Fayette Hospital, was purchased and the hospital was established. The first patient was admitted May 1, 1824.

Samuel Theobald, M.D., a physician on the hospital staff, and a member of the faculty of Transylvania University Medical School in Lexington, wrote a dissertation in 1828 arguing that the goal of the hospital was "the custodial care of the insane and the protection of society. Most of the lunatics admitted were incurable cases, as non-violent insane were to be maintained in private homes, being sent to the hospital when no longer tame enough to be kept at home…" In these early years, even the custodial treatment was less than ideal and barely met the minimal needs of the residents. There was no medical staff directly associated with the hospital at this time. Any severe medical problems were treated by physicians in the community, or by faculty and students of Transylvania College School of Medicine. In 1844, Eastern State Hospital welcomed its first medical superintendent, John Rowan Allen, M.D.: Eastern State Hospital has been under a full-time director ever since. With this change began an era of "moral treatment" during which the hospital staff strove to treat the residents humanely. "Moral treatment" meant compassionate and understanding treatment. Dorothea Dix, one of America's great philanthropists interested in the better treatment of the insane, visited the hospital in 1847, and again in 1858. Restraints including straitjackets, leather cuffs, chains, etc. were originally used and were accepted treatment for the mentally ill. Beginning with Dr. Allen's administration, the use of such measures was largely eliminated.

Following the discontinuance of Transylvania University Medical School around the end of the Civil War, the hospital's fortunes declined. The patient population increased, there was much over-crowding, and the use of restraints was re-activated. During the late 1800s and the early 1900s, modes of treatment often changed, usually as a direct reflection of the degree of interest and support provided by the public. In general, hospital staff attempted to give the best treatment possible with the current knowledge and with the resources made available by the public. In its first years, because of it being the only facility of its kind in the area, Eastern State Hospital admitted people from all over Kentucky and from nearby states. The census of the hospital has varied over the years.

Throughout the years, deletions, improvements, and additions have been made in the physical facilities and in the treatment programs. Metrazol-shock therapy and electric shock therapy were introduced in the 1940s. Metrazol-shock was used for a very short period. In the early 1950s, insulin therapy was used. In 1954, when tranquilizing drugs (used in conjunction with other therapies) were introduced, there was a decrease in insulin therapy; and by 1957, it was discontinued.

In 1945, the hospital was very crowded with a population of 2,000; as late as 1967, there were over 1,000 residents. Eastern State Hospital was an isolated institution, separate from the surrounding community. Many employees lived on the grounds in cottages, dormitories, separate rooms in the main hospital building, or with the residents. Residents did most of the work required to operate the hospital. Among the many jobs they performed were farm work; grounds and building maintenance; custodial work; cooking, serving, and dishwashing; laundry, sewing, and mending service. The hospital grew and prepared most of its foodstuffs on the hospital grounds. At one time, Eastern State Hospital grounds consisted of 400 acres, and most of this acreage was farmland. In 1956, over 300 acres were sold to IBM; at present, 88 acres make up the Eastern State Hospital grounds.

Then, in 1993, the non-profit organization Bluegrass Regional Mental Health-Mental Retardation Board, Inc. became concerned about the possible closing of the hospital. Many states had implemented health care reform that included cost containment and/or cost reduction features that were realized by rapid closing of inpatient facilities. It appeared that Kentucky could soon be faced with too few inpatient options and limited alternatives to inpatient care. Bluegrass Regional MH-MR pursued the possibility of taking over management of the hospital. Planning sessions with consumers and family members, community members, staff, state officials and other concerned parties provided information that was integral to the development of a hospital management plan.

In September 1995, Bluegrass Regional MH-MR took over management of Eastern State Hospital under a contract with the Commonwealth of Kentucky. Negotiations had taken nearly two years and implementation occurred in just over two months.

In 2013, Representative Jimmy Lee, D-Elizabethtown, a member of the Kentucky House of Representatives who was integrally involved with the new hospital, said the House of Representatives thought Bluegrass Regional needed help because of the expanded services offered by the hospital by bringing in UK Healthcare to operate the facility. On September 13, 2013, Kentucky Cabinet for Health and Family Services Secretary Audrey Tayse Haynes revealed that UK Healthcare signed a letter of intent to operate the hospital under a new $43 million contract with the Cabinet. Governor Steve Beshear approved the contract in later in 2013.

=== Former names ===
Eastern State Hospital was previously known as:

- Fayette Hospital (1817–1822)
- Lunatic Asylum (1822–1844)
- The Kentucky Lunatic Asylum (1844–1849)
- Lunatic Asylum of Kentucky (1850–1852)
- The Lunatic Asylum (1850–1852)
- The Eastern Lunatic Asylum (1852–1855)
- The Eastern Lunatic Asylum of Kentucky (1855–1858)
- The Kentucky Eastern Lunatic Asylum (1858–1864)
- Eastern Lunatic Asylum (1864–1867)
- The Kentucky Eastern Lunatic Asylum (1867–1873)
- The First Kentucky Lunatic Asylum (1873–1876)
- Eastern Kentucky Lunatic Asylum (1876–1894)
- Eastern Kentucky Asylum for the Insane (1894–1912)
- Eastern State Hospital (1912–present)

== Location ==
There were three main buildings where the treatment units were located on the former campus: The Main Building (a section of which is the original building; the remainder was built between 1835 and 1870); the Wendell Building, which was occupied in 1953; and the Allen Building, occupied in 1957. When it was first established, the name of the hospital was the Lunatic Asylum. In 1876, it was called Eastern Kentucky Lunatic Asylum. On January 2, 1912, the General Assembly, Commonwealth of Kentucky, officially renamed the facility Eastern State Hospital. During the 1960s there was a growth of the community mental health system throughout Kentucky until there was a center in most counties. These centers treated many people as outpatients thereby reducing the number of persons needing admission to an inpatient facility. In 1970, Kentucky state mental institutions converted to the geographic unit system. In the past, hospital residents had been placed according to their problem or diagnosis. Under the geographic unit system, residents were placed onwards according to the geographic area of the state from which they came. This facilitated hospital and comprehensive care staff communication. In 1975, the hospital was again reorganized into treatment services based on patient need.

On September 10, 2013, the hospital moved to its new facility. Under contract with the University of Kentucky's UK HealthCare, Eastern State has built a $129 million facility in which they will now house their patients (roughly 125–175). The facility is one large building with three large, three-story towers, named after the old buildings from the 4th Street campus (Gragg, Allen, and Wendell). Most of the original buildings were demolished by December 2013. All that remains are the administration and laundry buildings despite preservation attempts.

== Cemetery ==
Patients who were unknown, had families unable to pay to have their relative brought home, or patients who went unclaimed were buried on the hospital property from 1824 until 1954. The cemeteries were moved at least twice to the current location behind the Hope Center in 1984. The state acknowledges about 4,400 remains in the cemetery, but the number might be higher. The number of unmarked graves on the property is unknown. As work progresses on the property, any remains found there will be re-interred at this cemetery.

== See also ==
- Albert B. Chandler Hospital
