= University of Kentucky College of Health Sciences =

College of Health Sciences of the University of Kentucky in Lexington, KY, USA

- Type: Public
- Established: 1966
- Dean: Dr. Scott M. Lephart
- Location: Lexington, KY, U.S. 38.0315°N 84.5063°W
- Website: chs.uky.edu

The University of Kentucky College of Health Sciences (UKCHS) is a college within the University of Kentucky Medical Center focused on nine health science disciplines. It is located in the city of Lexington, Kentucky, United States. UKCHS has more than 1300 enrolled students with more than 68 faculty and is becoming more and more popular. The UKCHS is very competitive and has the highest four-year graduation rate on campus. Students after graduation go onto study diseases and how they affect the human body and many other health related careers.

== Programs ==
[1]

Department of Health and Clinical Sciences

Department of Athletic Training and Clinical Nutrition

Department of Communication Sciences and Disorders

Department of Physical Therapy

Department of Physician Assistant Studies

== Undergraduate ==
- Clinical Leadership and Management
- Communication Sciences & Disorders
- Human Health Sciences
- Medical Laboratory Science
- Minor in Health Advocacy
- Clinical Healthcare Management Certificate
- Undergraduate Certificate in Research in Human Health Sciences
- Certificate in Nutrition For Human Performance

== Graduate/Professional ==
- Athletic Training
- Clinical Nutrition (in collaboration with the College of Medicine)
- Communication Sciences & Disorders
- Physical Therapy
- Physician Assistant Studies
- Rehabilitation Sciences Doctoral Program
