= University of Kentucky =

Public university in Lexington, Kentucky, U.S.

- Former names: Agricultural and Mechanical College of Kentucky (1865–1908); State University, Lexington, Kentucky (1908–1915); State University of Kentucky (1915–1922)
- Motto: "United We Stand, Divided We Fall"
- Type: Public land-grant research university
- Established: February 22, 1865; 161 years ago
- Accreditation: SACS
- Academic affiliations: ORAU; URA; Space-grant
- Endowment: $2.48 billion (2026)
- Budget: $9.6 billion (2026–27)
- President: Eli Capilouto
- Provost: Robert S. DiPaola
- Administrative staff: 14,167 (2018–19)
- Students: 35,952 (fall 2024)
- Undergraduates: 25,586 (fall 2024)
- Postgraduates: 9,184 (fall 2024)
- Location: Lexington, Kentucky, United States; 38°01′57″N 84°30′09″W
- Campus: 784 acres (3.17 km^{2}); Large City
- Other campuses: Bowling Green; Hazard; Highland Heights; Morehead
- Newspaper: The Kentucky Kernel
- Colors: Blue and white
- Nickname: Wildcats
- Sporting affiliations: NCAA Division I FBS – SEC; SBC; GARC
- Mascots: The Wildcat; Blue; Scratch
- Website: uky.edu

The University of Kentucky (UK, UKY, or U of K) is a public land-grant research university in Lexington, Kentucky, United States. Founded in 1865 by John Bryan Bowman as the Agricultural and Mechanical College of Kentucky, the university is one of the state's two land-grant universities (the other being Kentucky State University). It is the institution with the highest enrollment in the state, with 35,952 students in the fall of 2024.

The institution comprises 16 colleges and offers undergraduate, graduate, and professional programs across a wide range of disciplines. It is classified among "R1: Doctoral Universities – Very high research spending and doctorate production". According to the National Science Foundation, Kentucky spent $476.5 million on research and development in 2022, ranking it 61st in the nation.

The University of Kentucky has seven libraries on campus. The largest is the William T. Young Library, a federal depository that hosts subjects related to social sciences, humanities, and life sciences collections. The university also hosts the Linguistic Atlas Project, an archive of American English dialect survey materials housed in the College of Arts & Sciences. Since 1997, the university has focused expenditures increasingly on research, following a compact formed by the Kentucky General Assembly. The directive mandated that the university become a "Top 20" public research institution, in terms of an overall ranking to be determined by the university itself, by 2020. Two alumni from the university have won Nobel Prizes.

== History ==
=== University origins ===
In the early commonwealth of Kentucky, higher education was limited to children from prominent families, disciplined apprentices, and young men seeking entry into clerical, legal, and medical professions. As the first university in the territory that would become Kentucky, Transylvania University was the primary center for education. After a merger it became "Kentucky University".

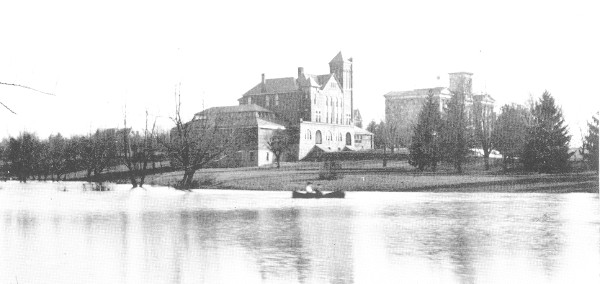
The early campus: Barker Hall in the center, the Main Building to the right, and a lake in the foreground where the Student Center was later built.

John Bryan Bowman was appointed head of the new "Agricultural and Mechanical College of Kentucky" (called "A&M"), a department of Kentucky University. It received federal support through the Morrill Land-Grant Act in 1865. In 1866 it opened with 190 students and 10 professors, on the campus at Ashland, The Henry Clay Estate. In 1869 James Kennedy Patterson replaced Bowman and the first degree was awarded. In 1876, the university began to offer master's degree programs. In 1878 A&M separated from Kentucky University, which reverted to its original name Transylvania University. For the new school, Lexington donated a 52-acre (210,000 m^{2}) park and fair ground, which became the core of UK's present campus. A&M was initially a male-only institution, but began to admit women in 1880.

In 1892, the official colors of the university, royal blue and white, were adopted. An earlier color set, blue and light yellow, was adopted earlier at a Kentucky-Centre College football game on December 19, 1891. The particular hue of blue was determined from a necktie, which was used to demonstrate the color of royal blue.

On February 15, 1882, Administration Building was the first building of three to be completed on the present campus. Three years later, the college formed the Agricultural Experiment Station, which researches issues relating to agribusiness, food processing, nutrition, water and soil resources and the environment. This was followed up by the creation of the university's Agricultural Extension Service in 1910, which was one of the first in the United States. The extension service became a model of the federally mandated programs that were required beginning in 1914.

=== Coeducational school: modern period ===
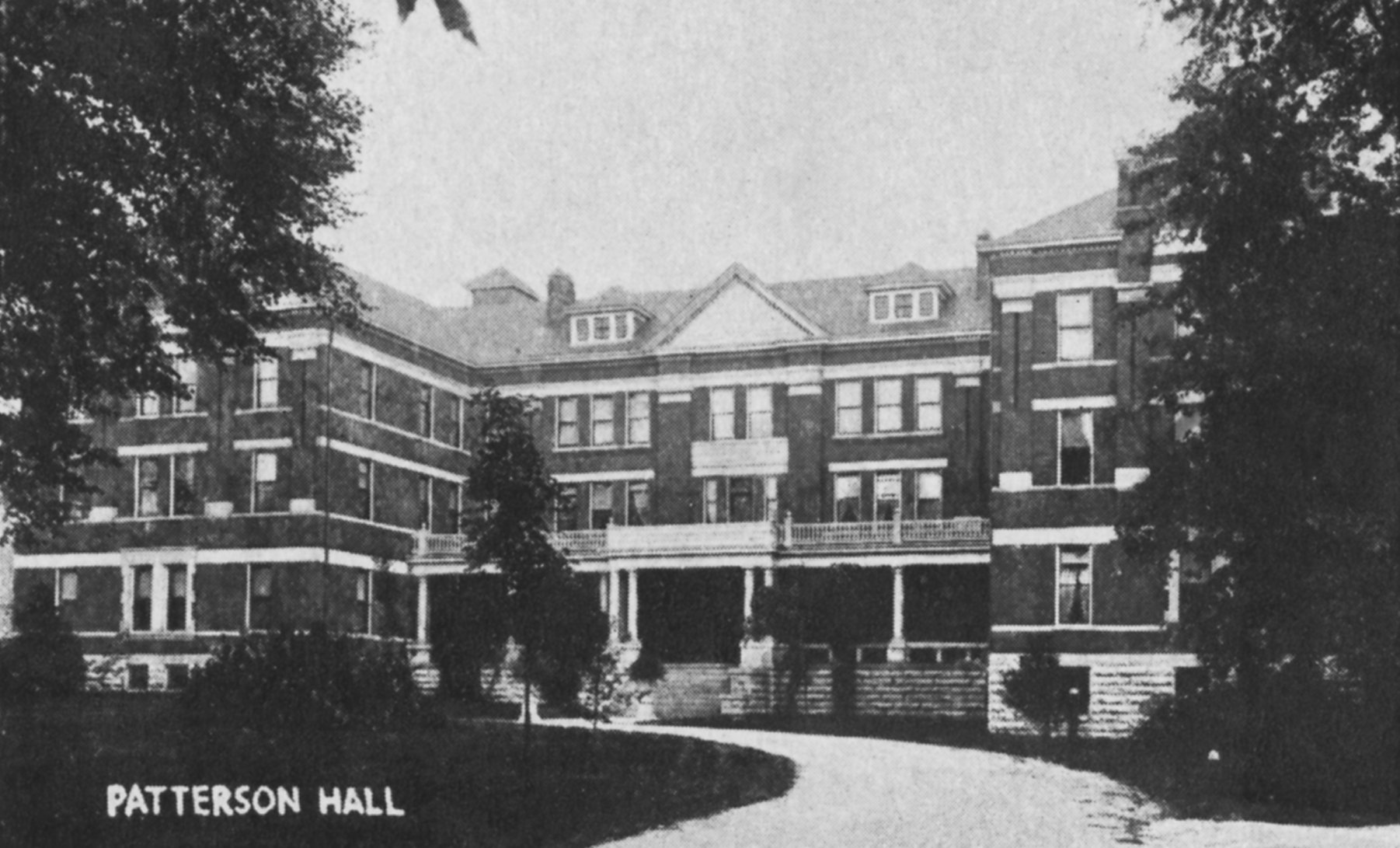
Patterson Hall, shortly after its 1904 opening

Patterson Hall, the school's first women's dormitory, was constructed in 1904. Residents had to cross a swampy depression, where the now demolished Student Center later stood, to reach central campus. Four years later, the school's name was changed to the "State University, Lexington, Kentucky" upon reaching university status, and then to the "University of Kentucky" in 1916. The university led to the creation of the College of Home Economics in 1916, and Mary E. Sweeney was promoted from chair of the Department of Home Economics to dean of the college. (Later renamed the College of Human Environmental Sciences, this educational unit was folded into the College of Agriculture in 2003 as the School of Human Environmental Sciences). The College of Commerce was established in 1925, known today as the Gatton College of Business and Economics.

In 1929, Memorial Hall was completed, dedicated to the 2,756 Kentuckians who died in World War I. This was followed up by the new King Library, which opened in 1931 and was named for a long-time library director, Margaret I. King.

On March 15, 1948, Lyman T. Johnson applied to the University of Kentucky Graduate School for a doctorate degree in the Philosophy of History. Johnson was subsequently denied admission, with the registrar citing the previously passed Day Law. Johnson, citing Plessy v. Ferguson in 1896 filed suit against the university for wrongful discrimination and failure to maintain equal learning intuitions. On April 27, 1949, Hiram Church Ford presided over the court case. After one day of testimony, Ford determined that the Commonwealth had failed to establish a graduate school with equal opportunity and educational quality as the graduate students offered to whites. Citing the Fourteenth amendment, Ford ruled that all qualified individuals, regardless of race, be allowed to attend the university's graduate program until an equally academically acceptable institution is established for the use of African Americans. The university's graduate and professional programs became racially integrated in 1949 when Lyman T. Johnson, an African American, won a lawsuit to be admitted to the graduate program. Blacks were not allowed to attend as undergraduates until 1954, following the US Supreme Court's Brown v. Board of Education decision.

In 1939, Governor Happy Chandler appointed the first woman trustee on the University of Kentucky Board of Trustees, Georgia M. Blazer of Ashland. She served from 1939 to 1960. In 1962, Blazer Hall was opened as the Georgia M Blazer Hall for Women in tribute to her.

Ground was broken for the Albert B. Chandler Hospital in 1955, when Kentucky Governor Happy Chandler recommended that the Kentucky General Assembly appropriate $5 million for the creation of the University of Kentucky College of Medicine and a medical center at the university. This was completed after a series of studies were conducted that highlighted the health needs of the citizens, as well as the need to train more physicians. Five years later, the College of Medicine and College of Nursing opened, followed by the College of Dentistry in 1962.

Nine years after the founding of The Northern Extension Center in Covington, representing the Ashland Independent School Board of Education, Ashland attorney Henderson Dysard and Ashland Oil & Refining Company founder and CEO Paul G. Blazer presented a proposal to President Dickey and the University of Kentucky Board of Trustees for the university to take over the day-to-day operations and curriculum of the Ashland [municipal] Junior College, creating the Ashland Center of the University of Kentucky in 1957. University of Kentucky Extension Centers in Fort Knox (1958), Cumberland (1960), and Henderson (1960) followed.

In 1959, the Patterson School of Diplomacy and International Commerce opened and began training professionals at the master's and doctoral level for careers in international affairs.

Authorized by the Kentucky General Assembly and signed by Governor Bert Combs on March 6, 1962, a mandate was placed upon the University of Kentucky to form a community college system. Two years later, the board of trustees implemented the legislation and established the Community College System, creating centers in Covington, Ashland, Fort Knox, Cumberland, Henderson and Elizabethtown. In 1969, the Patterson Office Tower was completed, currently the tallest building on campus.

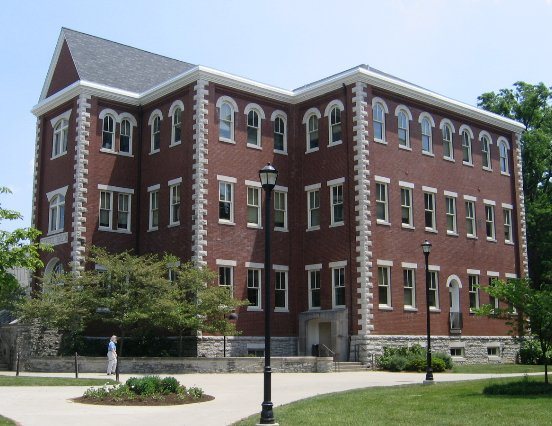
Miller Hall

In May 1970, students at the university began protesting the shootings at Kent State University. In response, Governor Louie Nunn deferred to the National Guard in an attempt to disperse the protesters. A ROTC building was destroyed by fire. The Louie B. Nunn Center for Oral History at the University of Kentucky Libraries has 13 oral history interviews with participants in the protests, university officials as well as former governor Nunn. Nine years later, the Singletary Center for the Arts opened, named in honor of former university president Otis Singletary.

=== Contemporary history ===
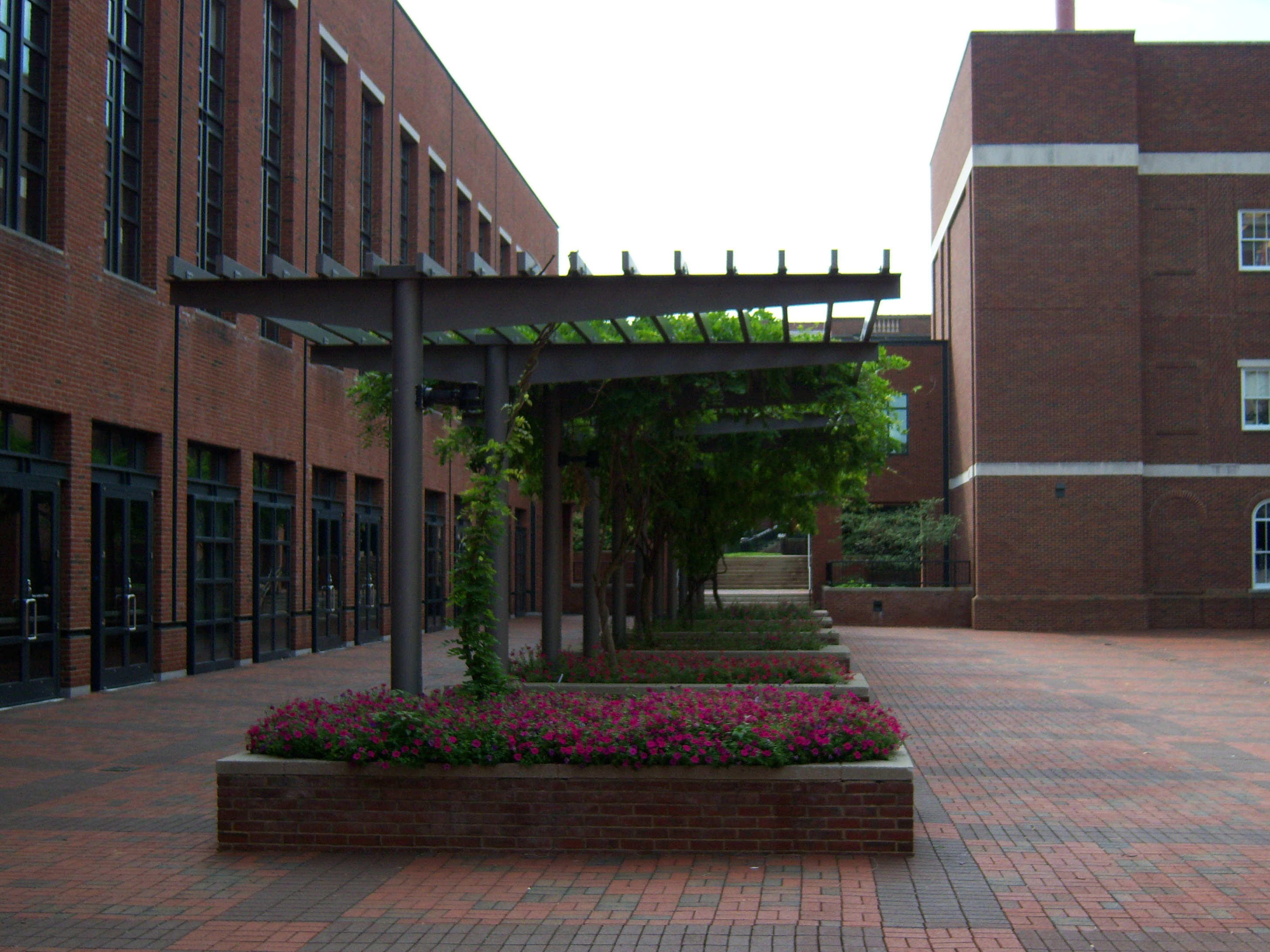
Engineering plaza

In 1997, the Kentucky General Assembly reorganized the community college system, withdrawing the university's jurisdiction from all but the Lexington Community College. The other colleges were merged with the Kentucky Technical College system and were placed under a separate board of control.

On April 3, 1998, work began on the William T. Young Library, which was the largest university project at the time of completion. The six-level William T. Young Library was constructed on south campus and the largest book endowment among all public university libraries in the country. William T. Young got his fortune from selling his peanut butter company to Procter & Gamble in 1955. Nine years after the completion of the William T. Young Library, on April 13, 2007, an entire city block of neighborhood homes were demolished and ground was broken for the Biological Pharmaceutical Complex Building, the largest academic building in the state of Kentucky, and one of the largest in the United States.

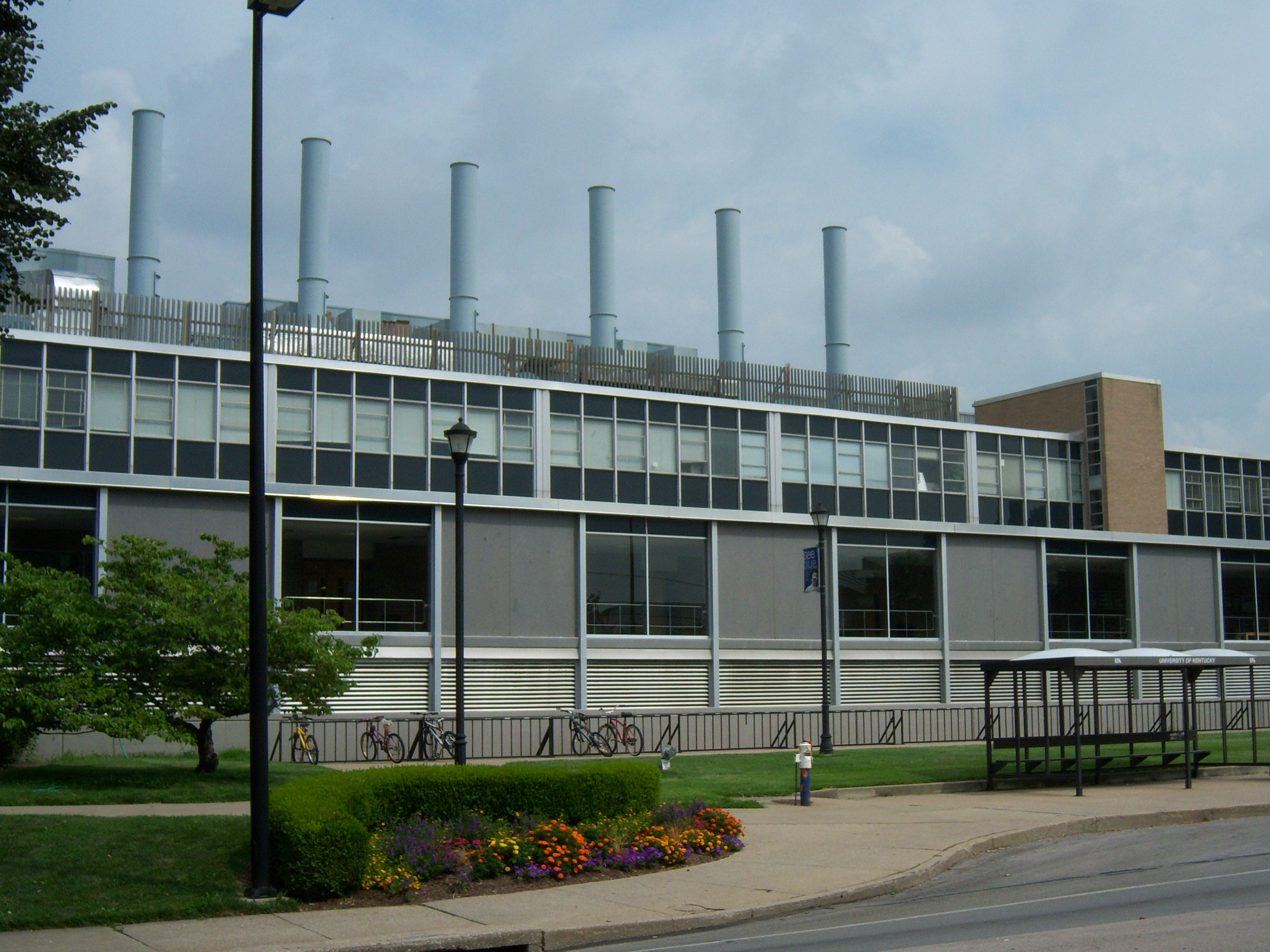
Chemistry-Physics Building

The Biological Pharmaceutical Complex Building complements the adjacent Biomedical Biological Science Research Building, and is expected to be part of the new university research campus. Other recent announcements include the construction of the new $450 million Albert B. Chandler Hospital, which will was one of the largest projects in the state's history in terms of size and economic impact.

In 1997, the Kentucky General Assembly formed a compact with the university. The Top 20 Plan mandated that the University of Kentucky would become a "Top 20" public research university by 2020. According to the compact, states with "Top 20" universities feature higher average household incomes, higher education attainments, healthier lives and more financial security. The plan would also spur technological advancements due to university-based research and increase the marketability of the state to investors.

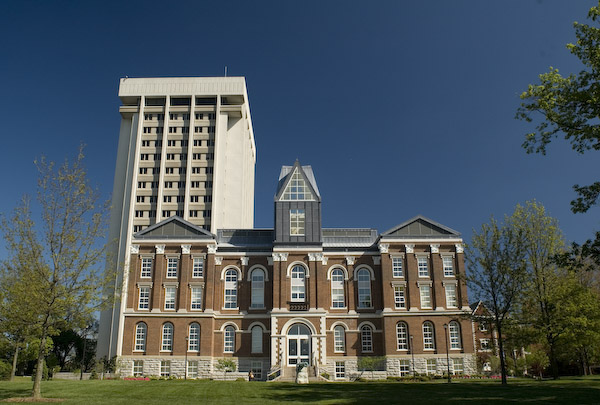
The Main Building in the foreground and the Patterson Office Tower in the background

University leader claimed that the plan produced some results, including:

1. Enrollment increased.
2. The six-year graduation rate increased from 59.5 percent in 1998 to 61.2 percent in 2007.
3. Research expenditures increased from $124.8 million in 1996 to $297.6 million in 2003. It dipped slightly to $274 million for 2005. It is currently ranked 28th among public universities in sponsored research.
4. Endowment increased from $195.1 million in 1997 to $538.4 million in 2005.

In 2000, the university launched "The Campaign for the University of Kentucky", a $600 million fundraising effort that was used to "enhance facilities, academic programs, public service, and scholarships." It passed that goal and the effort was raised to $1 billion. In March 2007, $1.022 billion was raised, months before the fundraising effort was set to end.

As of 2019, The University of Kentucky had an endowment of $1.407 billion. Prior endowments were $831.8 million in 2007, $538.4 million in 2005, and $195.1 million in 1997; the rapid increases were partially attributed to the Top 20 Plan. The William T. Young Library book endowment is the largest among public universities in the United States.

In 2018, the new Gatton Student Center was opened on North Campus. The 378,000-square-foot facility contains a cinema, several dining facilities, ballrooms, a bookstore, bank, offices, and more.

== Academics ==
=== Departments ===
Academic rankings

National
- Forbes: 200
- U.S. News & World Report: 148
- Washington Monthly: 159
- WSJ/College Pulse: 302

Global
- ARWU: 301–400
- QS: 781-790
- THE: 401–500
- U.S. News & World Report: 407

Students are divided into 16 colleges, and the university offers undergraduate, graduate, and professional programs across a wide range of disciplines. The University of Kentucky has fifteen libraries on campus. The largest is William T. Young Library, a federal depository, hosting subjects related to social sciences, humanities and life sciences collections. In recent years, the university has focused expenditures increasingly on research, following a compact formed by the Kentucky General Assembly in 1997. The directive mandated that the university become a Top 20 public research institution, in terms of an overall ranking to be determined by the university itself, by 2020. The university is ranked 148 in National Universities and 74 among public universities in the 2027 U.S. News & World Report rankings. According to the U.S. News & World Report 2023 ranking table, UK Graduate School of Pharmaceutical Sciences is ranked 6th in the nation whereas the Graduate School of Medicine (Research) is ranked 64th (tie).

Students are divided into several colleges based on their interests and specializations:

- College of Agriculture, Food and Environment, founded 1908
- College of Arts and Sciences, founded 1908
- Gatton College of Business and Economics, founded 1925 (originally as the College of Commerce)
- College of Communication & Information, founded 1976
- College of Dentistry, founded 1962

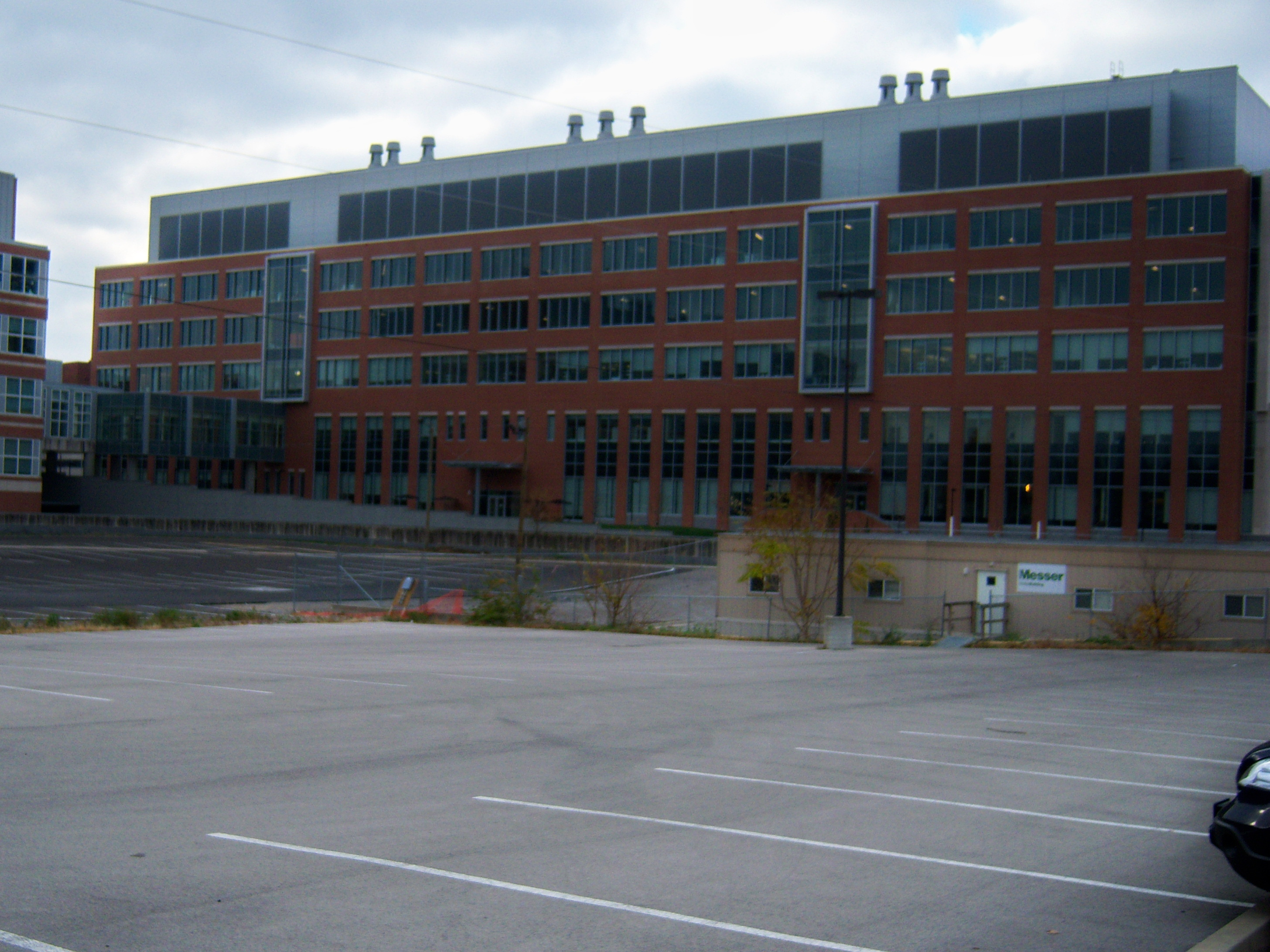
The Biological-Pharmaceutical Building is home to the College of Pharmacy

- College of Design, founded 1964 (originally as the College of Architecture)
- College of Education, founded 1923
- Pigman College of Engineering, founded 1918 (through a merger of the original Colleges of Civil Engineering, Mechanical Engineering, and Mines and Metals)
- College of Fine Arts, founded 1976
- College of Health Sciences, founded 1966 (originally as the College of Allied Health Personnel)
- J. David Rosenberg College of Law, founded 1908
- College of Medicine, founded 1954
- College of Nursing, founded 1956
- College of Pharmacy, founded 1947 (originally established in 1870 in Louisville)
- College of Public Health, founded 2004
- College of Social Work, founded 1968
- University of Kentucky Graduate School, founded 1912
- Martin School of Public Policy and Administration
- Patterson School of Diplomacy and International Commerce

Other colleges no longer in existence at the University of Kentucky include the College of Library Science (separating out of the College of Arts & Sciences in 1968 and incorporated in 2003 into what is now the College of Communication and Information) and the College of Home Economics (created in 1916 and whose founding dean was Mary E. Sweeney) now a School of Human Environmental Sciences located within the College of Agriculture.

=== Lewis Honors College ===
The Honors Program at the University of Kentucky began in 1958. It offers interdisciplinary, seminar-style classes of 15–20 students each as well as "H-section" classes that accelerate common course offerings such as chemistry, biology, and physics.

In October 2015, the University of Kentucky received the largest single gift in its history, $23.5 million from alumnus, longtime donor and successful entrepreneur Thomas W. Lewis and his wife Jan to create the Lewis Honors College. Subsequently, the Honors Program at UK became the Lewis Honors College. In 2017, the Honors Program became the Lewis Honors College. Its headquarters are in Lewis Hall, which also serves as one of several residence halls for Honors College students.

=== Institute for Latin Studies ===
Founded in 2001, the University of Kentucky's Institute for Latin Studies (Latin: Institutum Studiis Latinis Provehendis) is well known among Latin scholars for providing graduate level classes where instruction and student participation is conducted entirely in spoken Latin (a "living language" approach). The curriculum includes extensive reading in Latin, but also requires constant practice in writing and speaking in Latin. This program is unusual, and perhaps unique, in that Living Latin is studied at a conventional university for graduate credit and culminates formally with a graduate certificate in Latin studies. The program may be combined with a conventional master's degree in Classics.

== Student life ==
Undergraduate demographics as of Fall 2023
Race and ethnicity	Total
White	76%
Black	7%
Hispanic	6%
Asian	4%
Two or more races	4%
International student	1%
Unknown	1%
Economic diversity
Low-income (Note: The percentage of students who received an income-based federal Pell grant intended for low-income students.)	22%
Affluent (Note: The percentage of students who are a part of the American middle class at the bare minimum.)	78%

=== Students ===
The University of Kentucky strives for a diverse and international student population, with a selective admissions process.

In fall 2014, there were 30,000 students enrolled for the first time. This is due in part by the high number of out-of-state students. The percentage mix of students at this time were 62% in state and 38% out-of-state. During this time, the freshman class was recorded at 5,000 students.

=== Student government ===
The University of Kentucky Student Government Association (UKSGA) represents all undergraduate, graduate and professional students enrolled at the university in several critical ways. UKSGA exists to increase student influence over academic policy and to provide many helpful, creative and necessary student services. UKSGA also exists to protect and expand student substantive and procedural rights with the university and surrounding municipalities. Finally, UKSGA exists to better represent the student body in relations with faculty, administration, Board of Trustees and the Commonwealth of Kentucky.

UKSGA includes an Executive, Legislative, and Judicial Branch.

- Executive Branch: oversees day-to-day operations, manages budget, and facilitates major programs.
- Legislative Branch: includes the Student Senate. There are 46 legislators in this branch. Their goal is to allocate funds, approve presidential appointments, facilitate legislative changes, and represent the larger student voice.
- Judicial: composed of one chief justice and six Supreme Court justices. The Supreme Court rules on the constitutionality of legislation, handles claims levied against SGA officials, hears any election rules violation complaints and validates election results.

Several of their current programs include:

- Kentucky Wildcab: a late night transportation service designed to enhance the safety efforts of the university and surrounding community in partnership with UK Transportation.
- Wildcat Wardrobe: provides UK students with free professional dress clothing for interviews and jobs
- Safe CATS: provides UK students with a safer way to travel around campus by having SafeCats team members escort students to their destinations on-foot or by golf cart
- Student Legal Services: free on-site consultation for any legal issue by a local attorney
- Childcare Grants: available for part-time and full-time UK students, both at the undergraduate and graduate level, who need financial assistance for day-care service for their children.
- Scholarships
- Student Organization Funding: General Funding Grants, Club Sports Grants, Service Grants, Academic/Professional Conferences, and Senate Special Projects

Several distinguished student body presidents include Governor Steve Beshear.

=== Theater ===
In the early twentieth century, a group called The Strollers consisted of performers either studying or employed at the university or nearby. They performed regularly at the Lexington Opera House. In 1910, their first production there was the 1839 historical play Richelieu. At the end of the spring semester in 1918, as World War I was nearing its end, they performed several skits about war life and then projected large photographic images "showing actual battle scenes" and the humanitarian work of the Red Cross. University girls dressed as nurses served as ushers.

The first theater on UK grounds was the Campus Theater. In 1922, the university bought the Consolidated Baptist Church, a historically black congregation. The church's pastor had been Peter Vinegar. A group of performers and their benefactors, led by Carol M. Sax, raised more money to make the church into a theater, calling it Romany. They performed The Miracle of Sister Beatrice by Maurice Maeterlinck in 1927. In 1928, it was renamed Guignol Theater, after Théâtre du Grand Guignol in Paris, a theater on the Rue Chaptal from 1897 to 1962, housed in a former chapel and with seats for 293. After leaving Lexington, Sax staged Arthur Wilmurt's The Guest Room on Broadway in 1931; it ran for a respectable 67 shows. Eleanor Roosevelt attended opening night of his production of I.J. Golden's Re-Echo in New York in 1934; it ran for only 5 shows.

Frank C. Fowler was the second director of the Kentucky Guignol; he had received his master's degree from Brown University in 1928 and was hired by UK that same year. He was followed by Wallace Briggs. The fire that gutted UK's Guignol in 1947 is captured on film. In the 1930s and 1940s, one-act plays written by students were performed annually. A new Guignol Theater was opened in the Fine Arts Building in February, 1950 with a production of Medea. Two Blind Mice, a political satire by Samuel and Bella Spewack, followed after Medea.

During the 1950s, plays performed at the Guignol would often go on tour throughout Kentucky in the summer months.

=== Student media ===
The Electrical and Computer Engineering Department was the home of one of the earliest college amateur radio stations in the United States, beginning with W4JP that began continuous operation prior to World War I. In 1927, the station was relicensed as 9JL (later W9JL).

Students currently run two independent FM stations. The first, 91.3 FM WUKY, is a Triple-A station and was the first university-owned FM radio station in the United States and Kentucky's first public radio station. The operations started on October 17, 1940, as WBKY out of Beattyville, although the station moved five years later to Lexington.

In 1971, WBKY was one of the first to carry NPR's "All Things Considered" and helped debut National Public Radio, changing its call letters to WUKY in 1989 to better reflect its affiliation with the university. In 2007, it became the first Lexington radio station to broadcast in high-definition digital radio. The second is 88.1 FM WRFL-"Radio Free Lexington" which has been in operation since 1988. WRFL is operated by students and broadcasts live 24 hours a day, 7 days a week, and features music that is spread across most genres.

The campus is also served by the Kentucky Kernel, a student-run, financially independent daily newspaper, with the first issue published in 1915. The official yearbook of the University of Kentucky is the Kentuckian, first published in 1906. The Kentuckian was preceded by at least one previous book, the Echo.

=== Black Student Union ===
The University of Kentucky Black Student Union (BSU) was established on February 17, 1968. They were the first organization on campus that was created to support and protect students of color. Their goal was to fight for change on campus for diverse students. They work closely with other organizations on campus such as the Student Activities Board, Student Government Association and various fraternities. Their main mission is to educate the campus community on Black American students and to assist incoming minority students.

Jim Embry, born in Richmond, Kentucky, was the founding member of the organization, as well as, the first elected president. 51 years later, Embry is still fighting for progress in the social injustices and systemic racism on campus.

=== Greek life ===
Nineteen sororities and twenty-three fraternities representing over 3,000 students. There are also non-Greek organizations on campus, like Alpha Kappa Psi, a business fraternity and Tau Beta Sigma, a band fraternity. In 2007, the UK paper The Kentucky Kernel unleashed criticism and gained national attention for an editorial cartoon that depicted an African American pledge being auctioned; it was a comment on racial segregation in UK's Greek system. FarmHouse's chapter was suspended in 2021 for four years by the university, after a pledge died while attending a party in the fraternity's house. In 2023, Phi Tau was suspended for misuse of alcohol and other violations of law.

=== Athletics ===
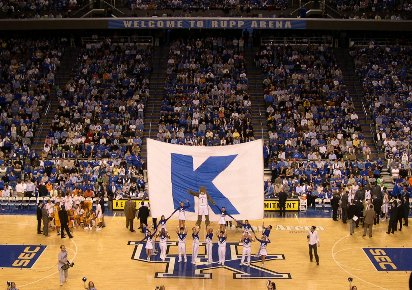
The Kentucky cheerleaders at Rupp Arena performing the traditional "Big K" cheer during a basketball game. Seating Capacity of Rupp Arena is 23,500.

University of Kentucky student-athletes compete as the Wildcats under colors Kentucky blue and white.

Beginning in the 1890s, students at the A&M scheduled football games with neighboring colleges. In 1902, the women's basketball program began on campus, and the men's team was added one year later. The "Wildcats" became associated with the university shortly after a football victory over Illinois on October 9, 1909. The then-chief of the military department, Commandant Carbuiser, stated that the team had "fought like wildcats." The slogan was later adopted by the university, and a costumed mascot debuted in 1976.

In 1930, then-high school coach Adolph Rupp was hired as a basketball coach and worked in that capacity for 42 years, retiring 1972. During his tenure, he led the men's basketball team to four NCAA championships in 1948, 1949, 1951 and 1958. The Wildcats later won a fifth championship under Joe B. Hall in 1978, another in 1996 under Rick Pitino and the next under Orlando "Tubby" Smith in 1998. In 2007, the University of Kentucky named Billy Gillispie as the head coach of the men's basketball team and on March 30, 2009, the university named John Calipari as the head coach of the Wildcats. Calipari coached the team to its eighth national title in 2012.

The university boasts of numerous national championships, with its latest coming in spring 2021 in women's volleyball for the fall 2020 season. UK also boasts of a cross country national team championship (women's, 1988), eight individual championships in gymnastics, an Olympic medalist in track and field, and 24 national championships in cheerleading. (Not an NCAA recognized championship) After defeating number-one ranked Oklahoma 13–7 in the Sugar Bowl under legendary coach Bear Bryant, Kentucky was also a co-national champion for the 1950 season.

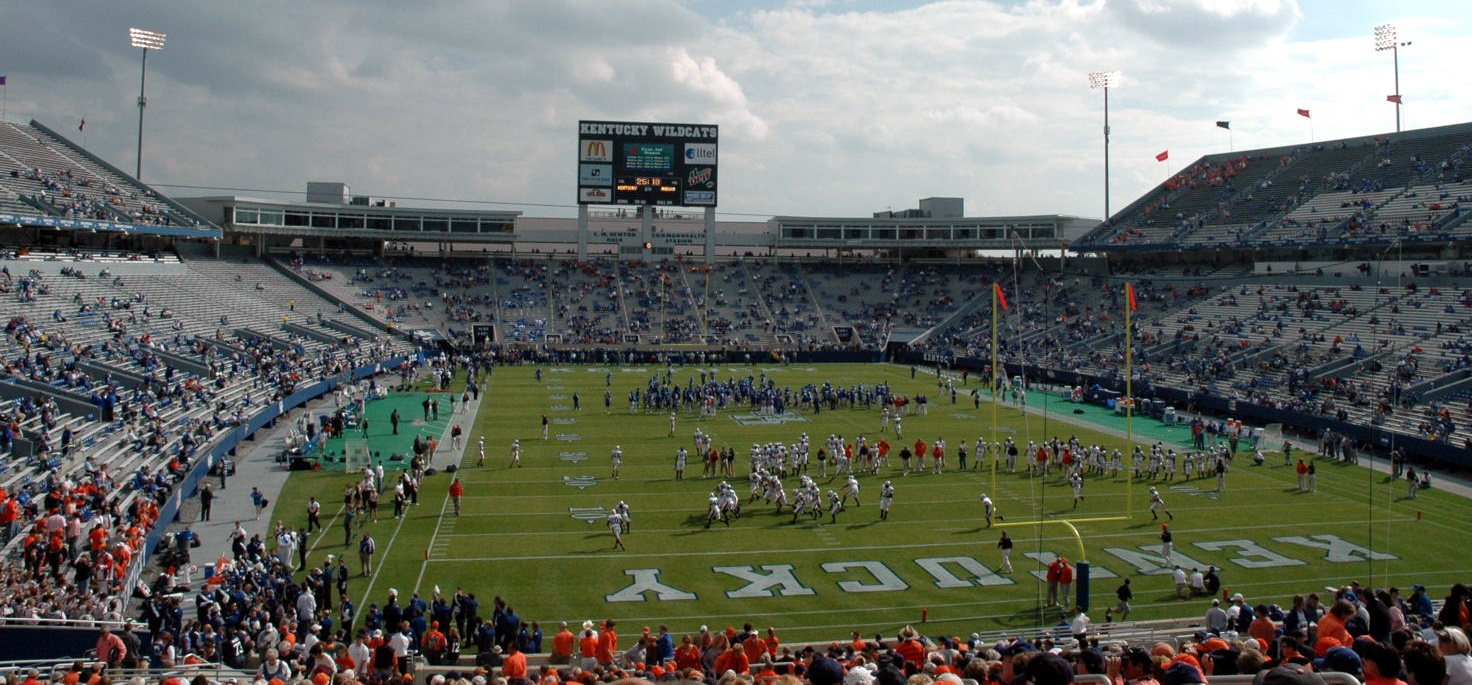
Pregame of 2005 Kentucky vs. Auburn game

The University of Kentucky Dance team was ranked fifth in the nation in Hip Hop and seventh in Pom in 2015.

Other athletic programs sponsored at the varsity level include baseball, men's and women's basketball, men's and women's cross country running, football, men's and women's golf, women's gymnastics, the coeducational sport of rifle, men's and women's soccer, women's softball, men's and women's swimming and diving, men's and women's tennis, men's and women's track and field and women's volleyball. The school also has a popular club-level men's ice hockey team and a rugby program that competes at the Division 1 level.

Notable among a number of songs commonly played and sung at various events such as commencement, convocation and athletic games is the University of Kentucky fight song: On, On, U of K. Additionally, the song Kentucky Fight is played before games.

In April 2024, a Title IX sexual violence lawsuit was filed against the University of Kentucky which alleged that there was a "toxic, sexually hostile environment" within the university swim program during the time Lars Jorgensen was swim coach between 2013 and 2023. The lawsuit further accused the university of "complicity" with Jorgensen and allowed him "to prey on, sexually harass, and commit horrific sexual assaults and violent rapes against young female coaches and collegiate athletes who were reliant on him."

=== Esports ===
University of Kentucky partnered up with South Korean Esport Organization Gen.G Esports and International Studies Abroad (ISA) to launch an international esports exchange programme in Seoul, South Korea.

== Campus ==
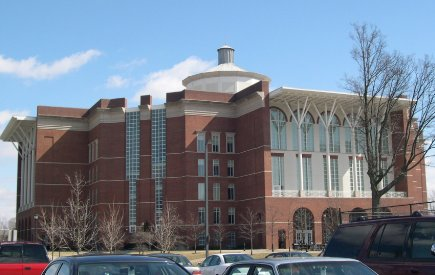
Completed in 1998, the William T. Young Library serves both the university campus and the Commonwealth of Kentucky

The University of Kentucky offers seven main dining facilities, 23 residence halls, and numerous recreation facilities spread between three distinct campuses: north, south, and central. It is also home to more than 250 student-run organizations.

The university campus is home to numerous notable structures, such as Main Building, a four-story administration building dating to 1882, which was gutted by fire on May 15, 2001. The Patterson Office Tower is the tallest building on campus.

The University of Kentucky once operated 14 community colleges with more than 100 extended sites, centers and campuses under the Kentucky Community and Technical College System, but relinquished control under the Postsecondary Education Improvement Act of 1997. The network of community colleges is now known as the Kentucky Community and Technical College System (KCTCS). Adjoining Lexington Community College, despite the reorganization of the community colleges, remained integrated with the university, but separated from the University of Kentucky in 2004 and became a part of KCTCS; it is now known as Bluegrass Community and Technical College.

The College of Engineering currently operates a satellite campus in Paducah, located on the campus of West Kentucky Community and Technical College.

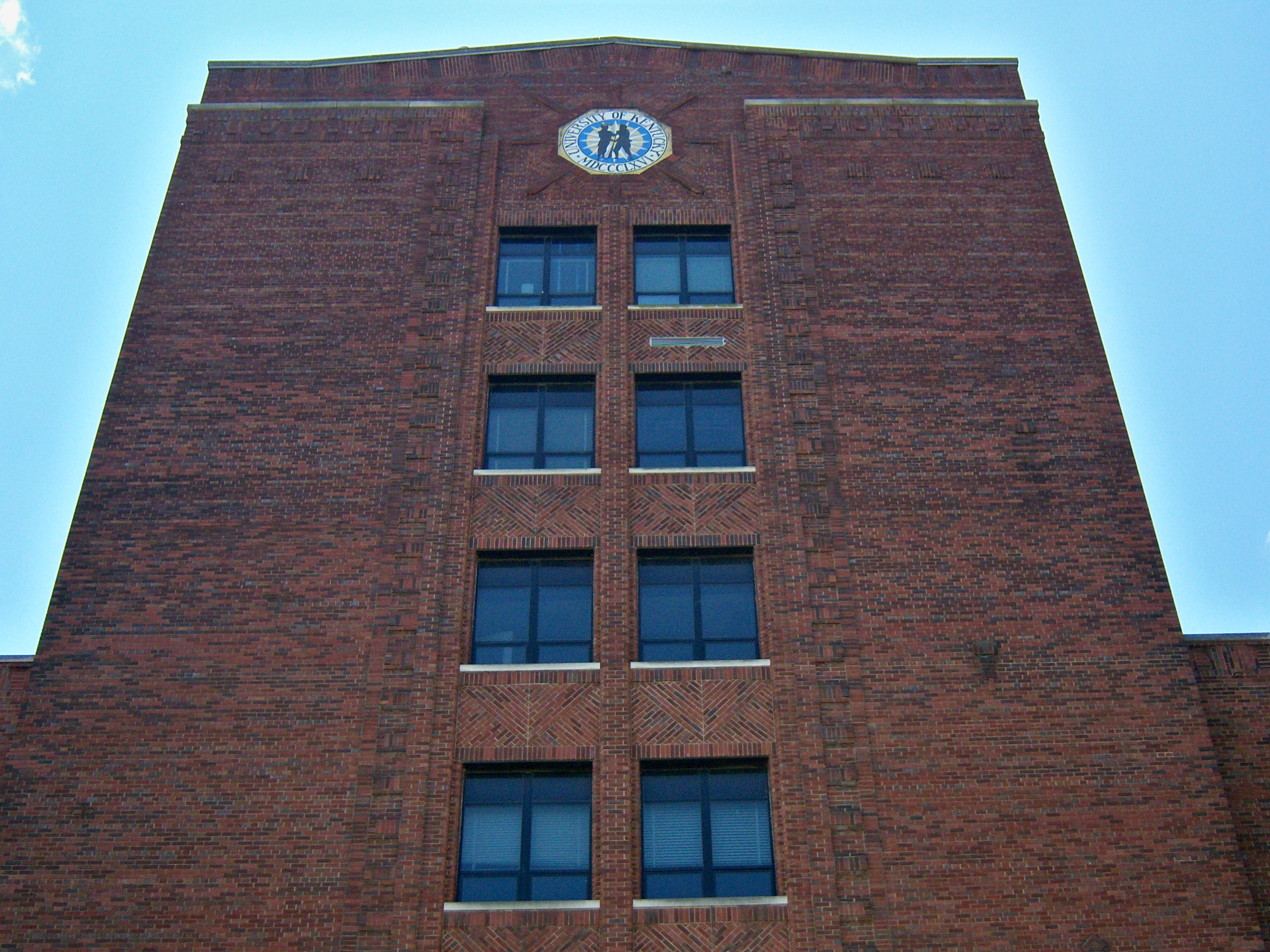
Funkhouser Building

=== Campus libraries ===
The University of Kentucky is home to seven campus libraries. Among them is the William T. Young Library, which houses a general undergraduate collection and social sciences, humanities, business, biology, and agricultural materials. The library is also a Federal Depository Library and a public library for the Commonwealth of Kentucky.

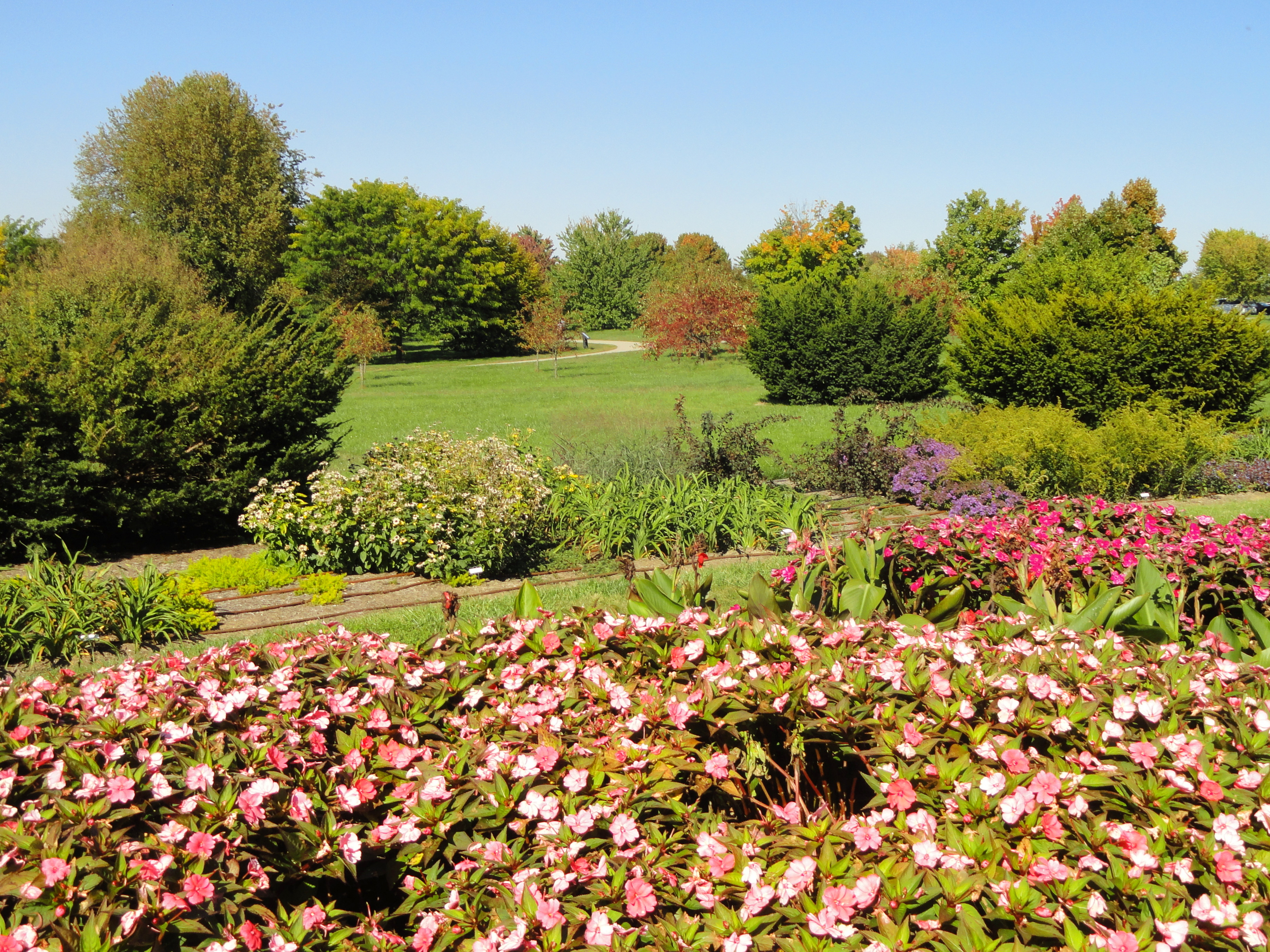
UK Arboretum

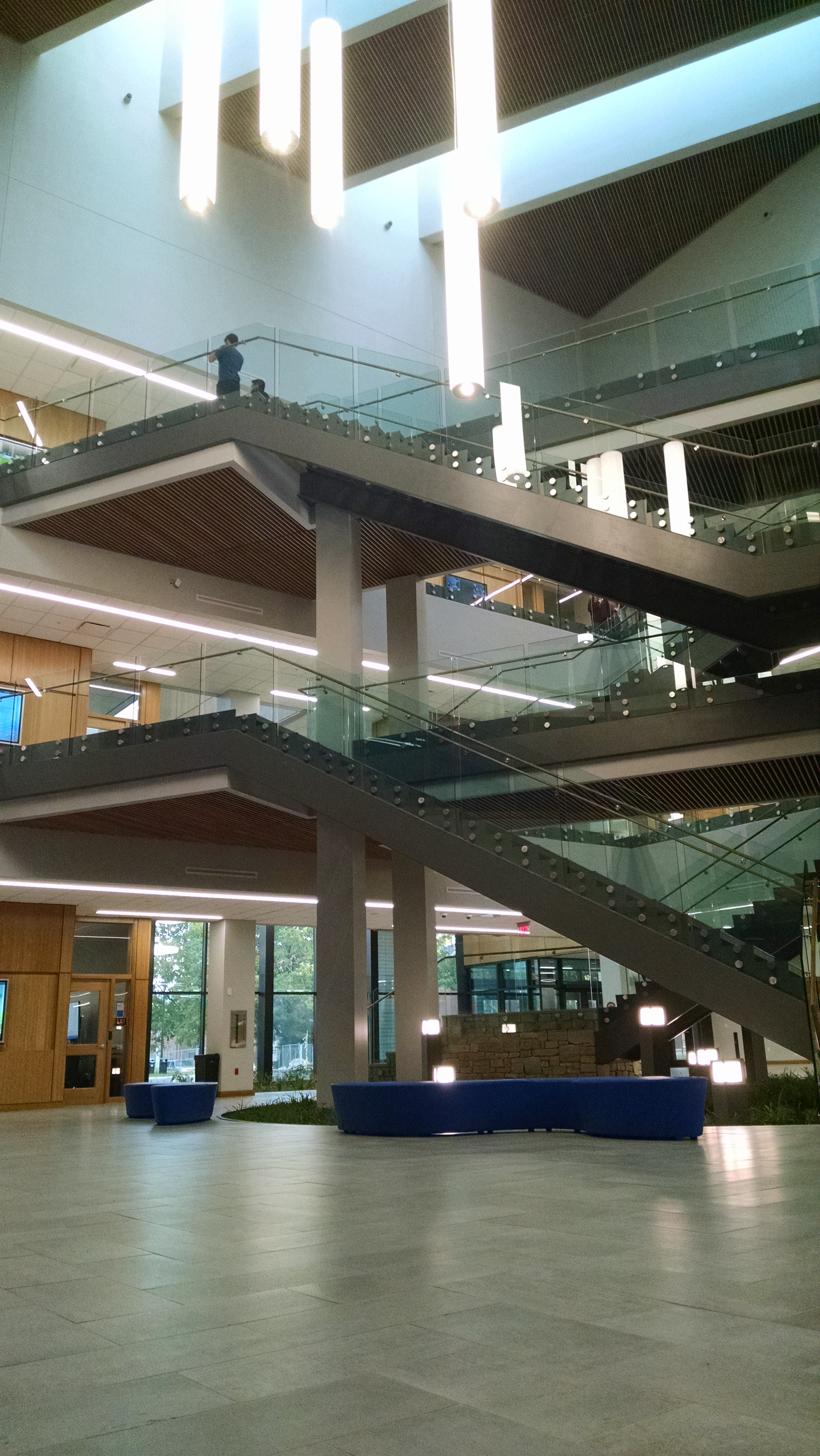
Interior of new science building

=== Campus landmarks ===
The University of Kentucky has several noteworthy landmarks:

- Kroger Field
- Memorial Coliseum
- Memorial Hall
- Singletary Center for the Arts
- University of Kentucky Art Museum
- University of Kentucky/Lexington-Fayette Urban County Government Arboretum
- University of Kentucky Research and Education Center Botanical Garden
- William T. Young Library

== Controversies ==
=== NCAA sanctions ===
The NCAA has sanctioned the university's athletic programs on several occasions. In 1952, in the first formal case handled by its infractions subcommittee, the NCAA charged that ten basketball players had received impermissible financial aid, and it barred the university from intercollegiate competition for a year; the NCAA's own history describes the penalty as, in effect, its first "death penalty." In 1964, it banned the football team from postseason play for a year because coaches had supervised required out-of-season conditioning drills in 1962 and 1963. In 1976, it placed the football and basketball programs on two years' probation for numerous violations, including gifts and inducements to recruits and their parents and cash payments by two assistant football coaches to players for plays in games; it said it eased the penalties because the university disclosed violations and cooperated.

In 1989, the NCAA put the men's basketball program on three years' probation and banned it from postseason play for two years for recruiting and academic violations. It found that an assistant coach had sent cash to a recruit's father and that a player had cheated on a college entrance exam and been allowed to play when the university should have known he was ineligible. Two players were declared ineligible, the team was barred from television for a season and limited to three scholarships a year for two years, and the university forfeited its 1988 NCAA tournament revenue; the NCAA said it had considered harsher penalties but reduced them because of the university's cooperation. Head coach Eddie Sutton and his staff left the program in the aftermath of the investigation.

In 2002, the NCAA placed the football program on three years' probation and banned it from a bowl game for one season over recruiting violations and academic fraud committed during the previous head coach's tenure, finding a lack of institutional control while crediting the university for acting quickly to investigate.

In August 2024, the university and the NCAA reached a negotiated resolution of infractions in two programs (swimming and football). Eleven football players had been paid for work they did not perform in 2021 and 2022, and eight of them played while ineligible; the university and the NCAA agreed that no athletics department member knew or should reasonably have known about the no-show jobs. The university also agreed that swimmers had not been given required days off and had exceeded practice-hour limits over three years, and that it had failed to monitor the swimming and diving program. It agreed to two years of probation, an undisclosed fine, and vacating the records of games in which ineligible football players competed including a Citrus Bowl victory.

=== Diversity, equity, and inclusion ===
In October 2025, the U.S. Department of Education's Office for Civil Rights announced that the university had violated Title VI of the Civil Rights Act through its participation in a conference hosted by The PhD Project, a nonprofit that works with students from underrepresented backgrounds seeking postgraduate business degrees. The department said the university endorsed, promoted, and benefited from a program that limited participation based on race. The university was one of 45 schools investigated for attending the conference. It cut ties with the organization shortly after the investigation was announced and signed an agreement with the department to close the investigation, under which it must report affiliations with other organizations that may restrict participation based on race.

In 2024, Republican legislators introduced bills to restrict DEI programs at public universities; they did not pass. In August 2024, after meeting with legislators who raised concerns, the university dissolved its Office of Institutional Diversity, ended mandatory diversity training and employee diversity statements, and said it would stop issuing statements on political or partisan issues. A new Office for Community Relations replaced it. In March 2025, the General Assembly overrode the governor's veto of a law banning DEI offices at public colleges.

=== Research integrity and faculty misconduct ===
Since 2012, the university has announced findings of research misconduct involving faculty and researchers on several occasions, and local media have reported on its handling of sexual harassment complaints.

In 2012, a researcher and vice-chair of the Department of Pediatrics who held an endowed chair in diabetes research resigned after two internal investigations, begun in 2010, found that he had falsified data. The U.S. Office of Research Integrity later reported falsified data in ten published papers and multiple grant applications over a decade, and the researcher agreed to a seven-year debarment from federal research.

A 2018 Herald Leader review found that university investigators had examined 57 sexual harassment and discrimination complaints between 2011 and 2016, eight of which involved faculty members. Two faculty members whom the university's equal opportunity office recommended stop teaching later left the university, and other faculty left under settlement agreements in which the university promised not to disclose the investigations unless legally required. In 2016, the university settled with a professor it had determined violated its sexual assault policy; a university spokeswoman said the professor offered to resign rather than face a hearing and possible termination proceedings.

In August 2019, the university announced that an internal investigation had found significant research misconduct, including falsified or fabricated data, in published papers and grant applications by two married professors in the Department of Toxicology and Cancer Biology and a research scientist in one of their labs. One of the professors, who studied metal toxicity and cancer, had led a $7.4 million federal grant for a research center on environmental health in Appalachian Kentucky, and was removed from that role. The scientist was fired and the university began termination proceedings against the professors. One professor resigned during that process; the other, a tenured professor who disputed the findings, resigned in June 2021, days before a scheduled Board of Trustees hearing on terminating his employment. Multiple papers involving them were retracted.

In 2020, the university announced the results of an investigation, begun in April 2019, into a former assistant professor in a Markey Cancer Center laboratory who had left in September 2019. It found research misconduct in four papers and two grant proposals, including data it said was intentionally fabricated in one paper, and said it would ask five journals to correct or retract articles. The supervisor of the lab, who was found responsible for a lack of oversight but not for collecting the data, stepped down from his research leadership role at the Markey Cancer Center and his endowed chair.

In September 2024, the university announced that a preliminary audit had found that Scott Stanley, a tenured professor and former director of its Equine Analytical Chemistry Lab, falsified at least one drug test result, and it began proceedings to revoke his tenure and dismiss him. The racing integrity authority removed UK's lab from its accredited list in March 2024 and is seeking over $1 million in reimbursement. The Board of Trustees voted to terminate his employment in September 2025.

== Notable faculty ==
- Kimberly W. Anderson, Chemist, Gill Eminent Professor of Chemical Engineering and Associate Dean for Administration and Academic Affairs in the College of Engineering
- John Clubbe, expert on Byron, Guggenheim Fellow
- Gary Ferland, Astrophysicist
- Lori Stewart Gonzalez, speech pathologist and 23rd president of Ohio University
- Arthur G. Hunt, American plant and soils scientist
- Daniel Lau, electrical engineer and IEEE fellow
- Milena Minkova, Latinist specializing in Neo-Latin studies and spoken Latin
- Melynda Price, Professor of Law, Director of African American and Africana Studies Program in the College of Arts and Sciences
- Juan Trigos, composer and conductor
- Terence Tunberg, Latinist specialising in Neo-Latin studies and spoken Latin
- Ronald Werner-Wilson (born 1962), Chair of the Family Studies Department and Kathryn Louise Chellgren Endowed Professor for Research in Family Studies

== Notable alumni ==
The university has more than 140,246 alumni in the state of Kentucky, 216,737 in the United States, and 1,119 internationally. The University of Kentucky Alumni Association is the primary affiliation for former students and faculty, and is located at the corner of Rose Street and Euclid Avenue. The building, dedicated in 1963, is named for Helen G. King, the first permanent director of the association and a former "Miss University of Kentucky". The association also meets at Spindletop Hall, a large mansion along Iron Works Pike, which serves as a central alumni gathering point.

The University of Kentucky boasts seven governors, including four former Governors of Kentucky: Steve Beshear, Ernie Fletcher, Paul E. Patton, and Albert "Happy" Chandler; Chandler was also a former U.S. Senator, and was the Commissioner of Major League Baseball from 1945 to 1951. Rounding out the other seven are the former Governor of Ohio Ted Strickland, former Governor of North Carolina Beverly Perdue, and former Governor of Arkansas Tom Jefferson Terral. Former U.S. Representative Ken Lucas from the commonwealth's fourth congressional district, and current U.S. Senator Mitch McConnell are other government officials that called the university home. Kelly Craft (née Guilfoil), former United States Ambassador to the United Nations and United States Ambassador to Canada, attended the university. Kelsey Ladt attended the university and graduated aged 14.

The United Methodist Bishop Alfred W. Gwinn also attended the university.

Carol Martin "Bill" Gatton, an automobile dealer executive, was the donor of the largest gift ever to the university, and is the namesake for the Gatton College of Business and Economics and the Gatton Student Center. Paul Chellgren, Chairman and CEO of Ashland Inc., also attended the university, and is the namesake for Chellgren Hall, formerly known as Woodland Glen I.

The university was also the home of Thomas Hunt Morgan, a scientist and winner of the 1933 Nobel Prize in Physiology or Medicine, and William Lipscomb, 1976 winner of the Nobel Prize in Chemistry. Doris Yvonne Wilkinson was the first African American to graduate from the university as an undergraduate student in 1958, and Joyce Hamilton Berry, a former clinical psychologist, was the first female African American to earn a Ph.D. from UK in 1970. Journalist and Miss USA 2021 Elle Smith, an African American, also attended the university.

Actresses such as Miss Elizabeth, Ashley Judd, and Adunni Ade also attended the university. Randall Cobb, a wide receiver for the Green Bay Packers; Josh Hines-Allen, a defensive end for the Jacksonville Jaguars; Anthony Davis, a power forward and center for the Dallas Mavericks; and Derek Bryant, a former outfielder for the Oakland Athletics from 1973 to 1981, are a few sports alumni from the university. Tyrese Maxey is a point guard for the 76ers.

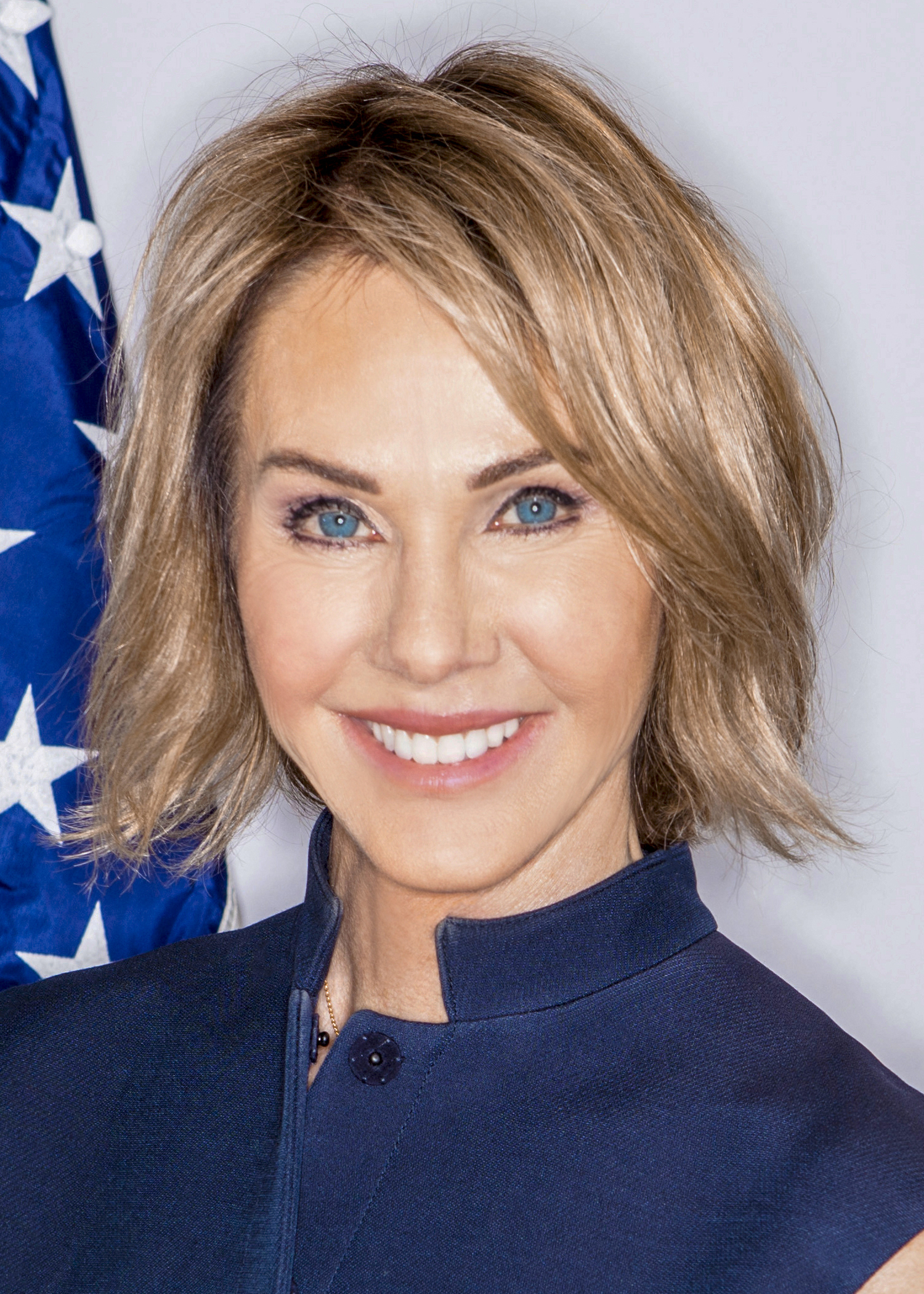
Kelly Craft, US Ambassador to the United Nations, US Ambassador to Canada

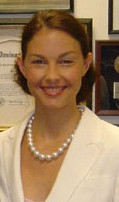
Ashley Judd, actress

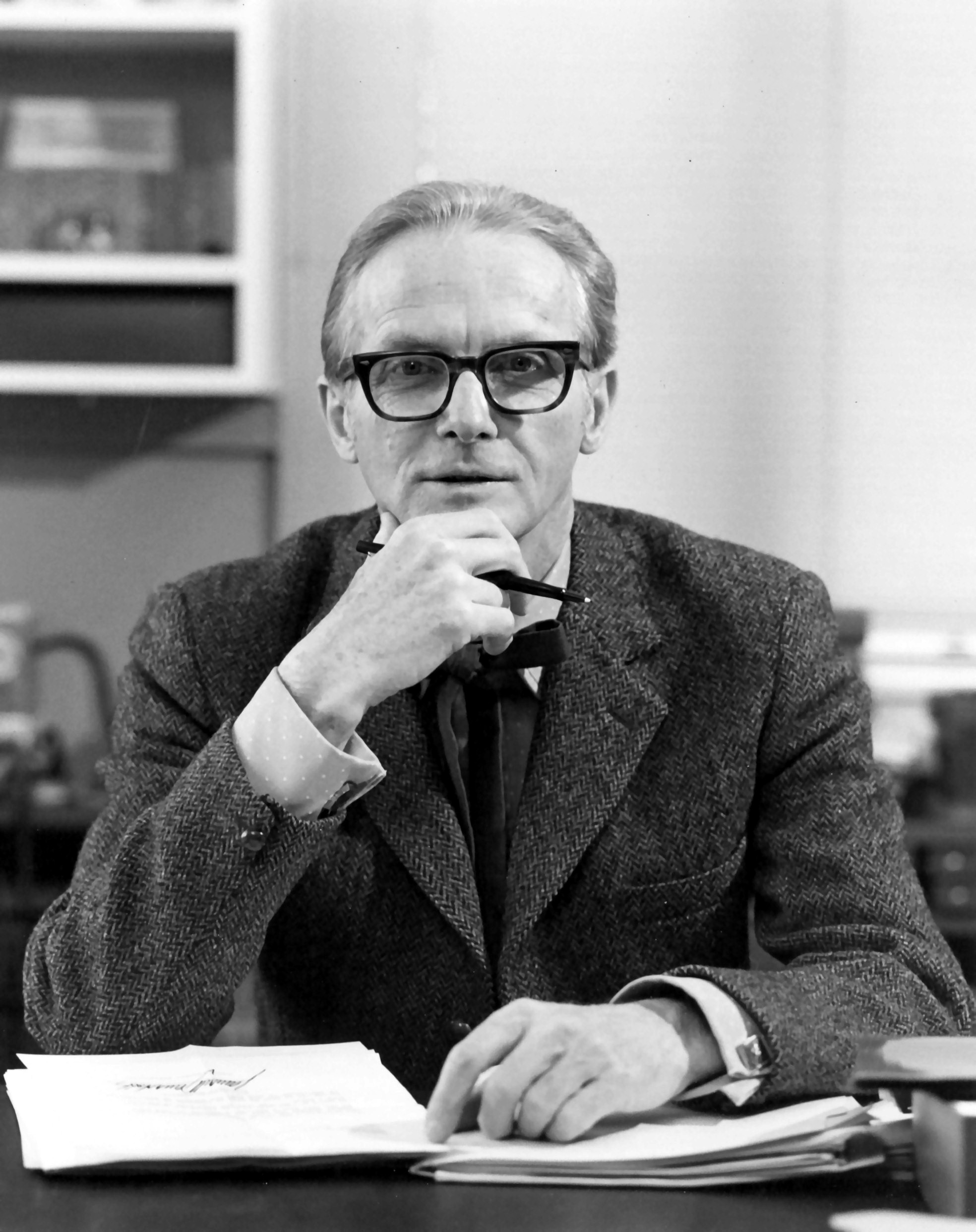
William Lipscomb, 1976 winner of the Nobel Prize in Chemistry

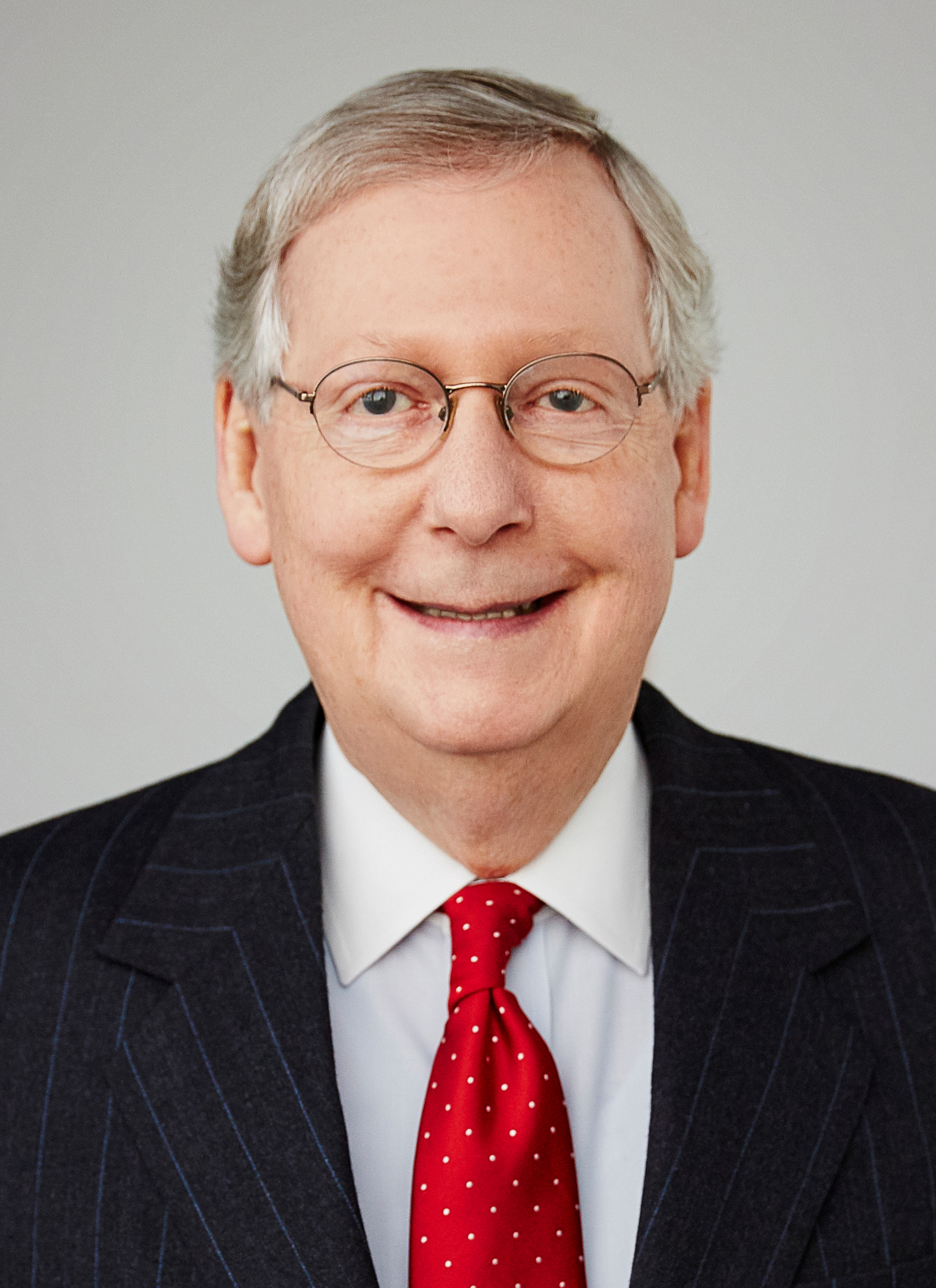
Mitch McConnell, U.S. Senator, longest-serving Senate Party Leader in U.S. History

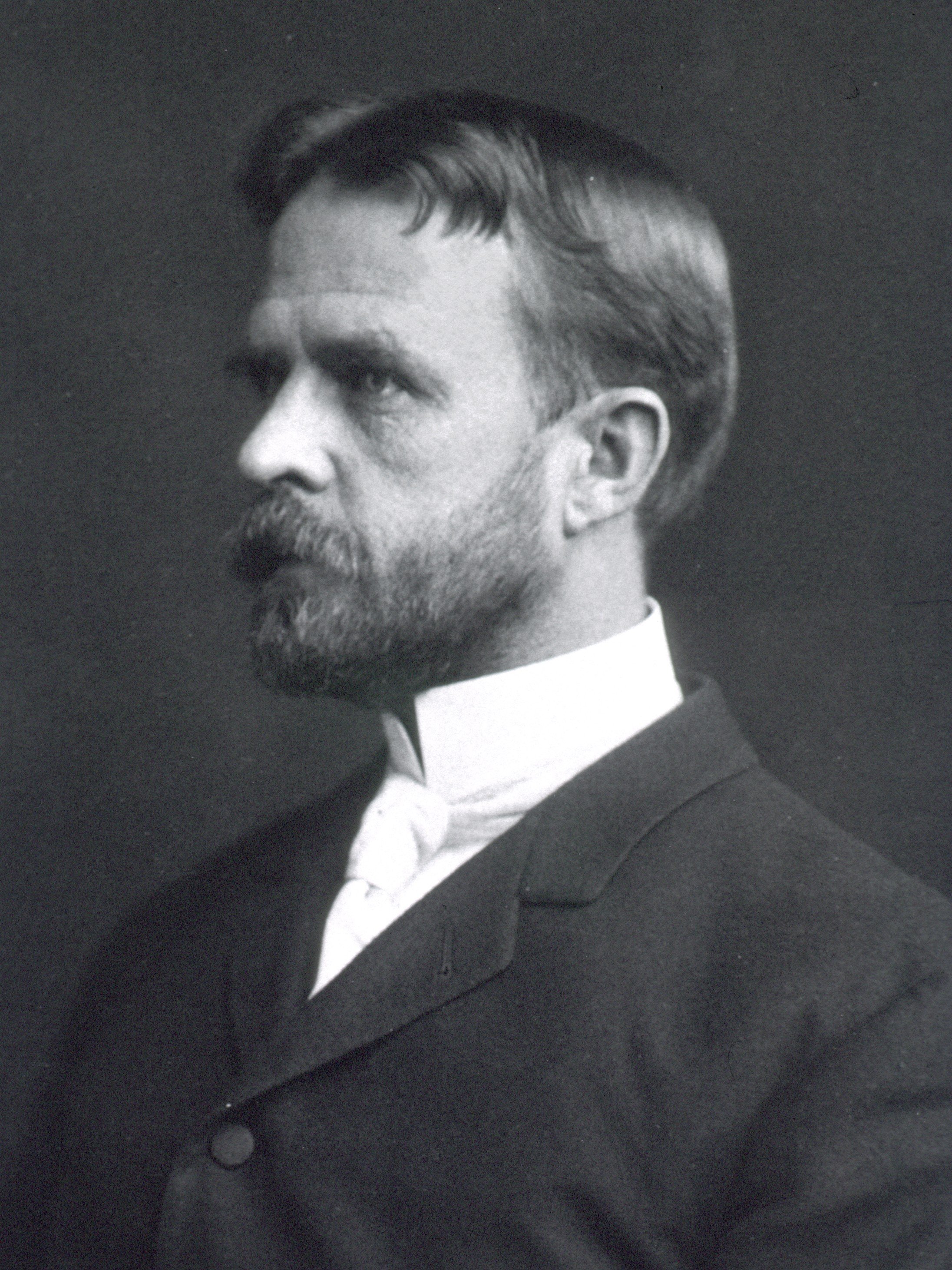
Thomas Hunt Morgan, recipient of the Nobel Prize in Physiology or Medicine, and father of modern genetics

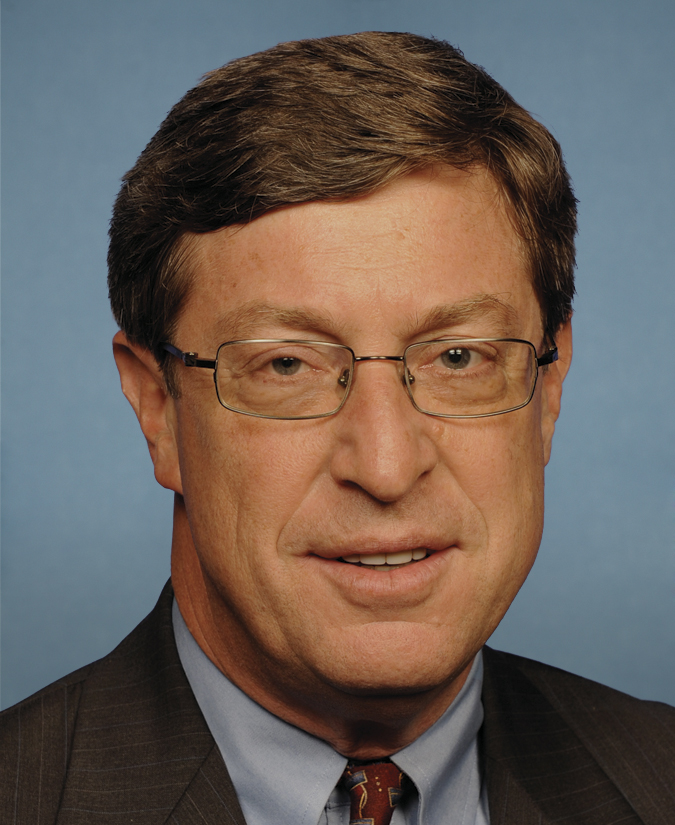
Ben Chandler, U.S. Congressman from Kentucky, 2004 to 2011

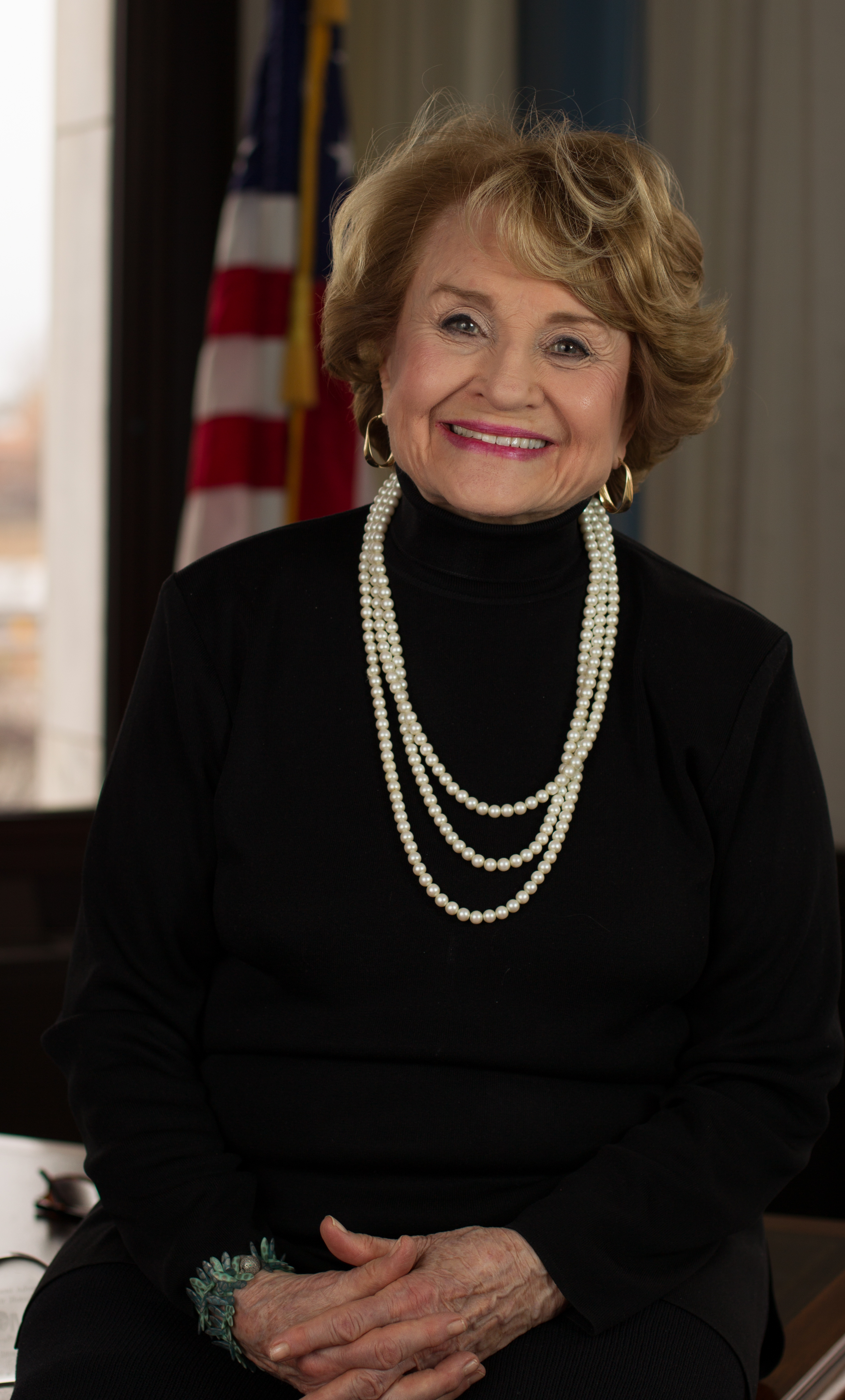
Louise Slaughter, U.S. Congresswoman from New York, 1987 to 2018. Chair of the House Rules Committee, 2007 to 2011

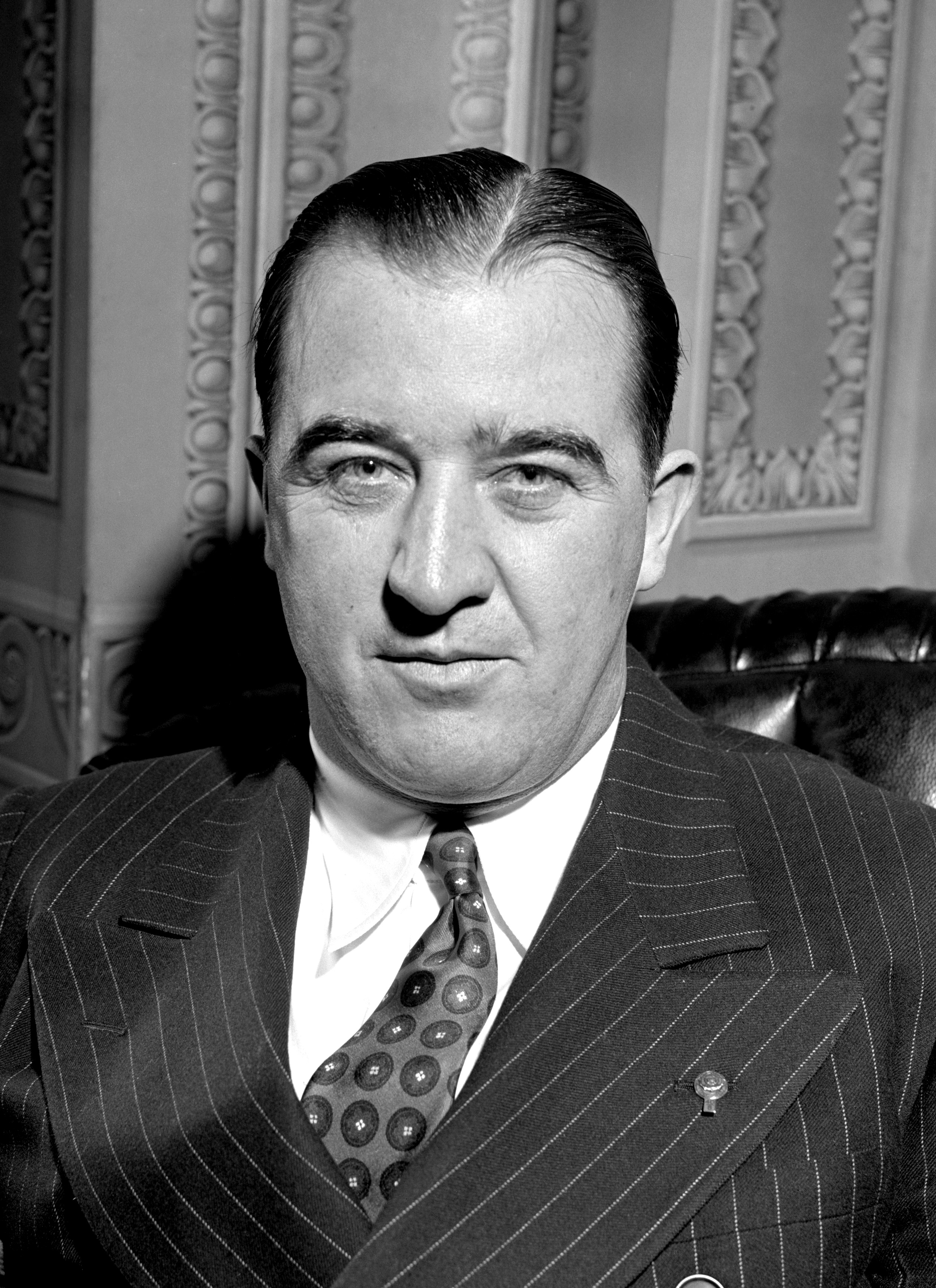
Albert "Happy" Chandler, 44th and 49th Governor of Kentucky; Commissioner of Major League Baseball, 1945 to 1951

== See also ==
- Education in Kentucky
- List of forestry universities and colleges
