= University of Kentucky College of Public Health =

College division in Lexington, KY, US

- Type: Public
- Established: 2004
- Dean: Heather M. Bush, PhD
- Location: Lexington, KY, USA; 38.0356°N 84.5069°W
- Website: www.uky.edu/publichealth/

The University of Kentucky College of Public Health is a school of public health at the University of Kentucky in Lexington, Kentucky, United States.

== History ==
The University of Kentucky College of Public Health was founded in 2004. Its programs are accredited by the Council on Education for Public Health (CEPH) and the Commission on Accreditation of Healthcare Management Education (CAHME).

== Degree programs ==
- Bachelor of Public Health (BPH)
- Master of Public Health (MPH) in six concentration areas: biostatistics, environmental health, epidemiology, gerontology, health behavior, and health services management
- Doctor of Public Health (DrPH) in four areas: epidemiology, gerontology, health behavior, and health services management
- Doctor of Philosophy (PhD) in gerontology
- Doctor of Philosophy (PhD) in epidemiology/biostatistics
- Dual degree programs: MD/MPH, PharmD/MPH, JD/MHA

== Research and outreach ==
Professors and at the college provide research for programs such as Kentucky Health Access Nurturing Development Services (HANDS), a home visitation program for high-risk parents, who are primarily young and low income, that has been praised by Rep. Kimberly Moser and Sen. Reginald Thomas. Professor Corrine Williams serves as the evaluator for the program.
