= University of Kentucky College of Pharmacy =

Pharmacy college in Kentucky, USA

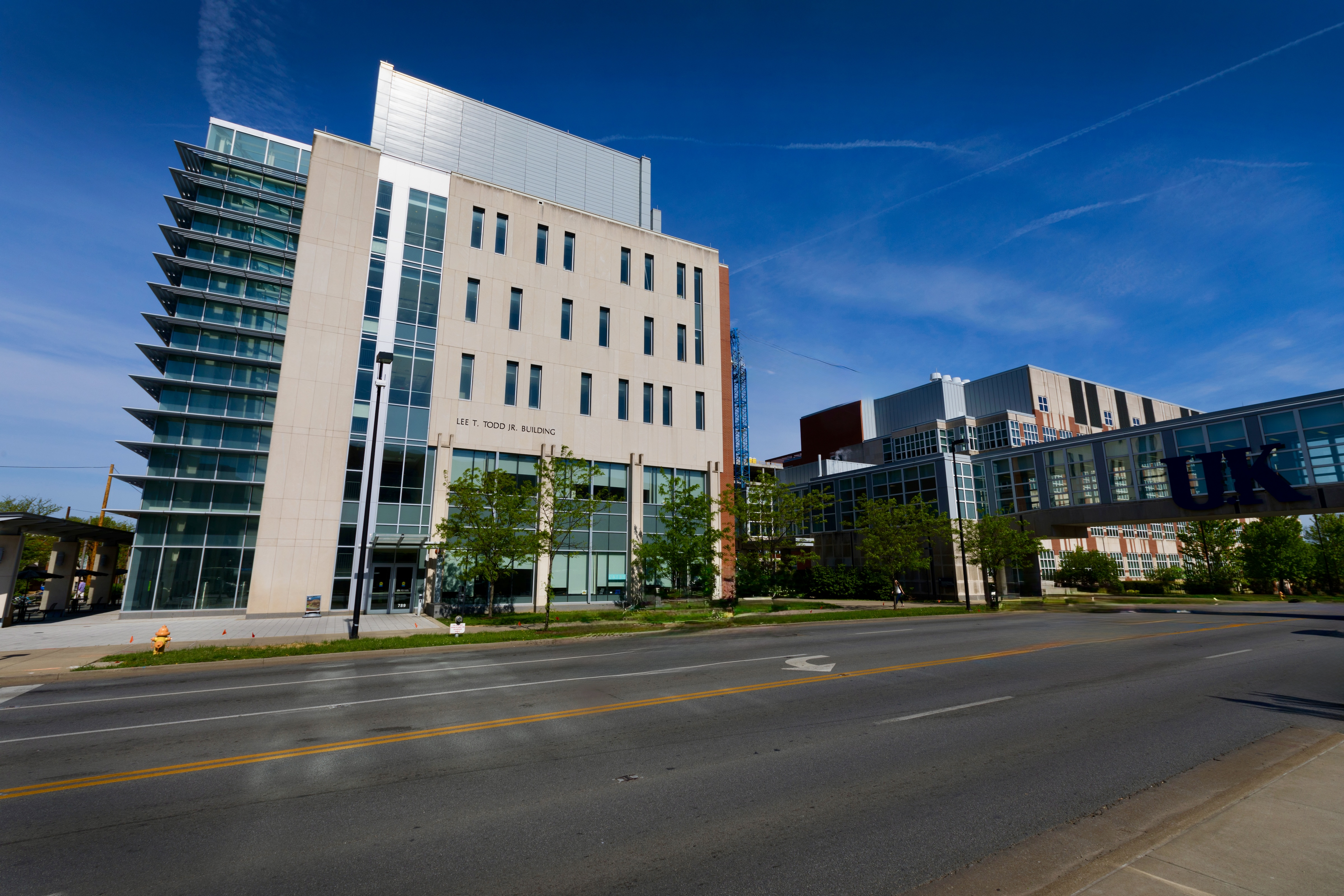
Lee T. Todd College of Pharmacy Building

The University of Kentucky College of Pharmacy is a college of pharmacy located in Lexington, Kentucky. In 2024, U.S. News & World Report recognized the UK College of Pharmacy as one of the nation's top ten pharmacy programs.

== History ==
The University at Kentucky College of Pharmacy has its roots in the Louisville College of Pharmacy. The Louisville College of Pharmacy was established in 1870 in Louisville, Kentucky. Like other pharmacy schools of that time, it was a free-standing institution. In 1947, it merged with the University of Kentucky (UK). However, it was not until 1957 that the school was moved from Louisville to Lexington.

In 1967, Dr. Joseph V. Swintosky became dean of the college. He significantly expanded the program by adding the Doctor of Pharmacy (Pharm.D.) and Doctor of Philosophy (Ph.D.) degrees, along with adding clinical and pharmacy practice residency programs. Swintosky also helped establish the Center for Pharmaceutical Science and Technology (CPST) as part of the College of Pharmacy in 1986.

UK broke ground on a new facility for the College of Pharmacy in 2007, moving from the nearby Rose Street location to a new location adjacent to the Kentucky Clinic on South Limestone. The new facility, known as Biological-Pharmaceutical Building, was dedicated on January 25, 2010. The complex was later renamed the Lee. T. Todd Jr. Building, named after the 11th president of the University of Kentucky who served from 2001 to 2011. It is connected to the nearby Biomedical and Biological Sciences Research Building (BBSRB) and the Healthy Kentucky Research Building (HKRB).

=== UK College of Pharmacy Deans ===
- Earl P. Slone, 1946–1967
- Joseph V. Swintosky, 1967–1987
- Jordan L. Cohen, 1988–2000
- Kenneth B. Roberts, 2000–2009
- Timothy S. Tracy, 2010–2015
- Kelly M. Smith, 2015–2016 (Interim Dean)
- R. Kip Guy, 2016–2025
- Craig A. Martin, 2025–Current (Interim Dean)

== Academics ==
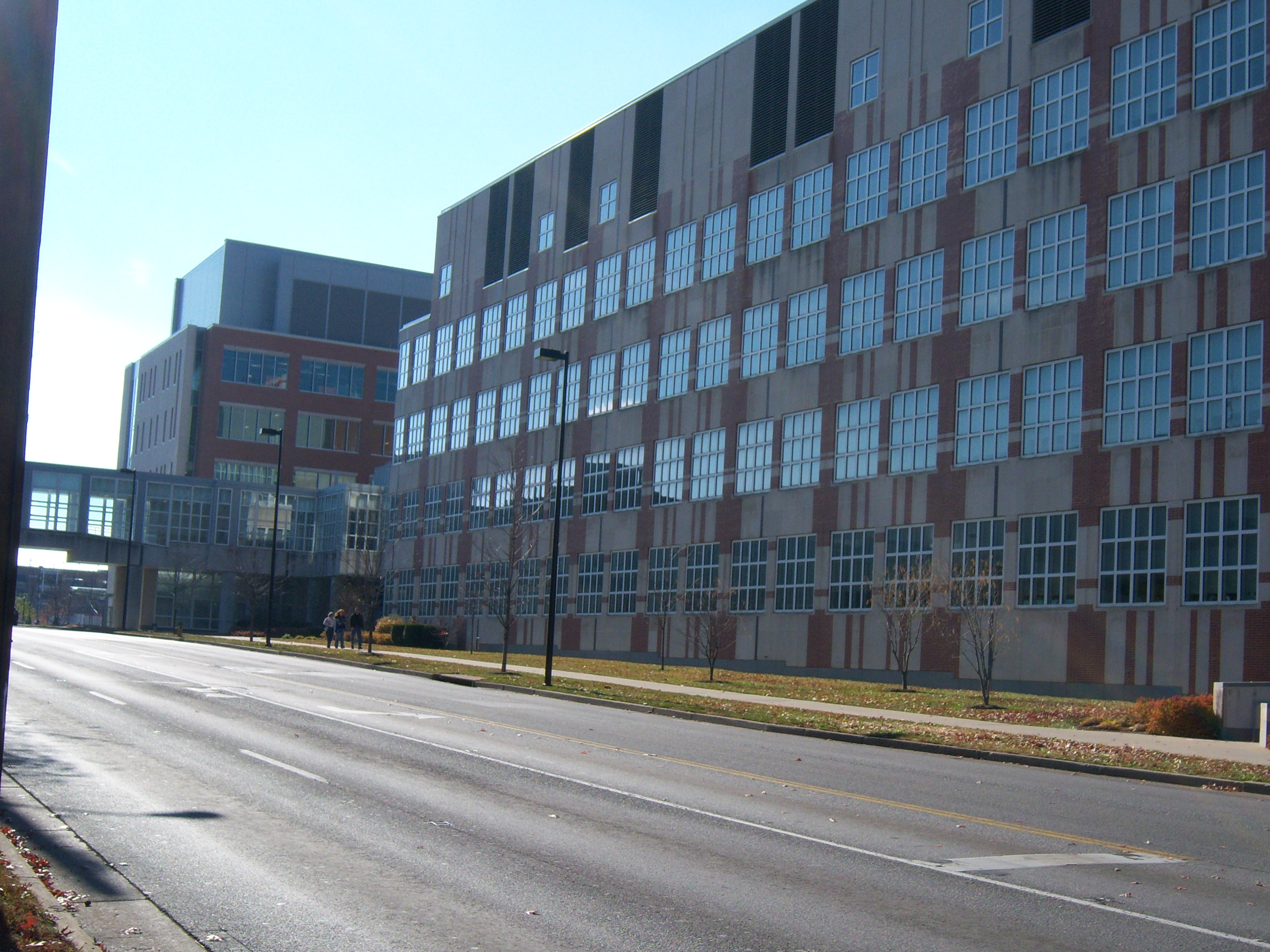
The Lee T. Todd Jr. Building (far left) and the Biomedical/Biological Sciences Research Building (right and center)

Students at the University of Kentucky College of Pharmacy may earn a PharmD degree through a 4-year professional program, which consists of 3 years of didactic courses followed by 1 year of clinical pharmacy rotations. In addition, the College of Pharmacy offers several dual-degree programs that allow prospective pharmacists to receive an additional degree along with a PharmD. These include the Masters of Pharmaceutical Sciences, the Masters of Public Health, the Masters in Public Administration, and the Masters of Business Administration.

=== Research ===
The University of Kentucky College of Pharmacy has a history of research in the pharmaceutical sciences. The faculty, graduate students, postdoctoral scholars, and staff of the College of Pharmacy conduct front-line research in areas of pharmaceutics that range from identifying fundamental mechanisms of disease to designing and developing new drugs to understanding the impact of policies on health care. The research interests of faculty members can be organized broadly into 4 major areas: Drug Discovery, Drug Development, Therapeutics, and Pharmaceutical Outcomes and Policy, with each area containing multiple more specific and descriptive sub-categories. The vitality of these research programs is evidenced by the many projects, often in multiple categories, that have been awarded nationally competitive funding and that are underway at the College of Pharmacy.

== Significance ==
- The UK College of Pharmacy was the first pharmacy school east of the Mississippi River to offer the Pharm.D. program.
- The college established the first drug information center in the US, but it was discontinued in 2006.
- Currently the college ranks 6th among college of pharmacies based on the U.S. News & World Report poll of pharmacy deans and faculty.
- Pharmacy research faculty rank 4th out of 354 institutions in scholarly activity.
- The UK Pharmacy Residency Program was recognized as the Nation's Most Outstanding in 2007 by the residency accrediting body, the American Society of Health-System Pharmacists (ASHP).
