= Timeline of Lexington, Kentucky =

The following is a timeline of the history of Lexington, Kentucky, United States.

== 18th century ==
- 1775 – Lexington founded in the Colony of Virginia by Colonel Robert Patterson.
- 1776 – Lexington becomes part of the new state of Virginia.
- 1780 - Transylvania University founded.
- 1782
  - May – Town of Lexington established.
  - August – Siege of Bryan Station.
- 1784 – Mount Zion Church founded.
- 1787 – Kentucky Gazette newspaper begins publication.
- 1789
  - Lexington Light Infantry organized.
  - Transylvania Seminary opens.
- 1790
  - Population: 2,000.
  - First African Baptist Church founded (approximate date).
- 1792
  - Lexington becomes part of the new state of Kentucky.
  - Kentucky legislature begins meeting.
- 1796
  - Episcopal church established.
  - Lexington Library founded.
- 1797 – Postlethwait's Tavern built.

== 19th century ==
Lexington, Kentucky, 1871

- 1801 – Walnut Hill Presbyterian Church built.
- 1806
  - Court House built.
  - Sign of the Green Tree tavern in business (approximate date).
- 1808 – The Reporter newspaper begins publication.
- 1809 – Lexington Jockey Club formed.
- 1810 - Population: 4,326.
- 1811
  - Ashland (Henry Clay estate) established.
  - Giron confectionery in business.
- 1812 – Juvenile Library organized.
- 1814 – Hunt House (residence) built.
- 1816 – Usher's Theater built (approximate date).
- 1818 – Athenaeum founded.
- 1820
  - Population: 5,279.
  - African Methodist Episcopal Church Established North Upper St
- 1821 – Lafayette Seminary established.
- 1823 – St. Catherine's Academy for girls established.
- 1824 – Eastern Lunatic Asylum established.
- 1826 - African Methodist Episcopal Church 251 N. Upper St building built
  - Kentucky Association formed.
  - Masonic Hall dedicated.
- 1830
  - Lexington and Ohio Railroad established.
  - Population: 6,026.
- 1831
  - Lexington Observer newspaper begins publication.
  - Christians and Disciples of Christ of the Restoration Movement meet at the Hill Street Christian Church on December 31, 1831, to merge the separate movements. Groups that descend from this merger include the Christian Church (Disciples of Christ), Church of Christ, and Christian churches and churches of Christ. The Hill Street Church, which had been founded by Stone in 1816, is now Central Christian Church (Disciples of Christ).
- 1832
  - Episcopal Burying Ground established.
  - Chartered as a city.
- 1833 – Cholera epidemic.
- 1835 - Frankfort-Lexington railway begins operating.
- 1840 - Population: 6,997.
- 1844 – Market-house built.
- 1845
  - Christ Church Episcopal built.
  - True American anti-slavery newspaper begins publication.
- 1847 – Licking and Lexington Railroad begins operating.
- 1848 – Lexington and Frankfort Railroad takes over the former Lexington & Ohio.
- 1849
  - Lexington Cemetery established.
  - Covington and Lexington Railroad begins operating.
- 1850
  - Lexington and Danville Railroad begins operating.
  - Maysville and Lexington Railroad begins operating.
  - Population: 8,159.
- 1854 – Sayre School established.
- 1856 – First African Baptist Church built.
- 1859 – Kentucky Central railroad begins operating trains to Cincinnati.
- 1860 – Lexington and Southern Kentucky Railroad begins operating.
- 1861 – August – Union cavalry arrive.
- 1863 – Lexington National Cemetery established.
- 1865
  - College of the Bible established.
  - Kentucky Agricultural and Mechanical College established.
- 1867 – Cincinnati, Lexington and East Tennessee Railroad begins operating.
- 1869
  - Louisville, Cincinnati and Lexington Railroad merges the Lexington and Frankfort Railroad with the Louisville and Frankfort Railroad.
  - Elizabethtown, Lexington and Big Sandy Railroad begins operating.
  - Hocker Female College established.
  - Cemetery of the Union Benevolent Society No. 2 in use.
- 1870
  - Lexington Herald-Leader|Lexington Daily Press begins publication.
  - Odd Fellows Temple built.
- 1872 – First Presbyterian Church built.
- 1873
  - Smith Business College established.
  - Trotting Track constructed by Kentucky Trotting Horse Breeders Association.
- 1874
  - Lexington Railway Company streetcars in operation.
  - Population: 13,600.
- 1876 – Gordon School for boys established.
- 1877 – Saint Joseph Hospital founded.
- 1880 - Population: 16,656.
- 1882 – Floral Hall built.
- 1885 - On July 18, "Woman Triumphant," a marble statue by Joel Tanner Hart portraying a classical nude woman and a Cupid, bought by the Hart's Memorial Association $4,000) and Fayette County ($1,000), was installed in the Fayette County Courthouse
- 1886 - State Normal School for Colored Persons founded.
- 1887 –
  - Opera House opens.
  - John C. Breckinridge Memorial by Edward Valentine, erected on November 24. The 8 foot bronze statue, on 11 foot pedestal of granite was placed in the center of Cheapside Street on the east of the court-house and facing the building.
- 1888 – Kentucky Leader newspaper begins publication.
- 1889 - The Kentucky Equal Rights Association meets at the Courthouse in Lexington - its second annual meeting after having been founded in 1888 (during the American Woman Suffrage Association meeting in Cincinnati)
- 1892 – Lexington Standard newspaper begins publication.
- 1894
  - The Fayette Equal Rights Association petitioned the Mayor and City Council to appoint a woman on the school board. Mayor Henry T. Duncan appointed Mrs. Wilbur R. Smith.
  - Woman's Club of Central Kentucky organized.
  - Central Christian Church built.
- 1895 - Women (black and white) in Lexington began voting in Lexington Public School Board elections. 2000 women voted in Lexington and four women were elected to the Board of Education.
- 1900 – Population: 26,369.

== 20th century ==
- 1902 - Women's right to vote in school board elections in Lexington, Covington and Newport (Kentucky's second-class cities) was revoked by the Kentucky General Assembly. Lexington's Representative William A. "Billy" Klair and Senator J. Embry Allen introduced and led the campaign to repeal the 1894 partial suffrage statute.
- 1905 – Lexington Public Library opens.
- 1907 – Lexington Union Station opens.
- 1908 – College of Law, State University of Kentucky established.
- 1910 – Population: 35,099.
- 1916 – Stoll Field/McLean Stadium opens.
- 1920 – Population: 41,534.
- 1922 – Kentucky Theater opens.
- 1925 – Sesquicentennial.
- 1926 – Church of the Good Shepherd dedicated.
- 1930 – Population: 45,736.
- 1931 – Lexington Veterans Affairs Medical Center established.
- 1934
  - WLAP radio begins broadcasting.
  - United States Post Office and Court House built.
- 1935 – United States Narcotic Farm in operation.
- 1936 – Keeneland Race Course opens; Ashland Stakes begin.
- 1938 – Lexington Children's Theatre founded.
- 1946 – F. W. Woolworth Building constructed.
- 1949 – Youth Symphony Orchestra active.
- 1950
  - Ashland (Henry Clay estate) museum opens.
  - Memorial Coliseum (University of Kentucky) opens.
  - Population: 55,534.
- 1951 – John C. Watts becomes U.S. representative for Kentucky's 6th congressional district.
- 1955
  - WLEX-TV (television) begins broadcasting.
  - Blue Grass Trust for Historic Preservation organized.
- 1957
  - WKYT (television) begins broadcasting.
  - Waveland museum opens.
- 1958 – Urban growth boundary enacted.
- 1960 – Population: 62,810.
- 1961 – Central Kentucky Philharmonic Society formed.
- 1969 – Cliff Hagan Stadium opens.
- 1970 – Population: 108,137.
- 1972
  - Blackburn Correctional Complex built.
  - Lexington Council of the Arts organized.
  - Transit Authority of the Lexington-Fayette Urban County Government established.
  - H. Foster Pettit, former state representative, becomes mayor of Lexington.
- 1973
  - Commonwealth Stadium (Kentucky) opens.
- 1974
  - City and Fayette County governments consolidated; Lexington-Fayette Urban County Government formed.
  - Regional Lexington Area Metropolitan Planning Organization established.
  - U.S. Federal Medical Center prison in operation.
  - Lexington Ballet Company founded.
  - Festival of the Bluegrass begins.
- 1975 – Lexington Mall built.
- 1976 – Lexington Center and Rupp Arena open.
- 1978 – Kentucky Horse Park opens.
- 1979 – Kincaid Towers built.
- 1980 – Population: 204,165.
- 1983 – Lexington Herald-Leader in publication.
- 1986 – High Security Unit, U.S. Federal Bureau of Prisons, in operation.
- 1987
  - Lexington Financial Center built.
  - Park Plaza Apartments built.
- 1990
  - Lexington Children's Museum opens.
  - Population: 225,366.
- 1991 – Arboretum established.
- 1995 – Aviation Museum of Kentucky incorporated.
- 1996
  - City website online.
  - UK Soccer Complex opens.
- 1997 - The first shops open in Hamburg Pavilion.
- 1998 - William T. Young Library established.
- 2000 – Population: 260,512.

== 21st century ==
- 2001 – Whitaker Bank Ballpark opens.
- 2003
  - The Dame music hall opens.
  - Lexington History Museum opens.
- 2004 – Kentucky Horse Park Arboretum established.
- 2005 – Bluegrass Community and Technical College established.
- 2009
  - Boomslang (music festival) begins.
  - The Alltech Arena opens.
  - Lexington Film League formed.
- 2010
  - Population: 295,803.
  - Lexington becomes the first city outside of Europe to host the World Equestrian Games.
- 2011
  - Jim Gray becomes mayor.
  - The first Harry Dean Stanton film festival held
- 2012 - The Town Branch Distillery opens.
- 2013
  - Andy Barr becomes U.S. representative for Kentucky's 6th congressional district.
  - Construction of CentrePointe begins.
- 2014 – Redevelopment of the Fayette National Bank Building begins.
- 2015 – Keeneland hosted the Breeders' Cup for the first time.
- 2017 – The city's newest high school, Frederick Douglass High School, opens.

== See also ==
- Lexington history
- National Register of Historic Places listings in Fayette County, Kentucky
- Timeline of Kentucky history
- Other cities in Kentucky:
  - Timeline of Louisville, Kentucky
  - Timeline of Newport, Kentucky

== Bibliography ==
=== Published in 19th century ===
- Samuel R. Brown (1817). "Lexington". The Western Gazetteer; or, Emigrant's Directory. Auburn, N.Y: Printed by H.C. Southwick. OCLC 10530489.
- Daniel Blowe (1820), "Lexington", A Geographical, Historical, Commercial, and Agricultural View of the United States of America, London: Edwards & Knibb
- George Washington Ranck (1872), History of Lexington, Kentucky: Its Early Annals and Recent Progress, R. Clarke, OCLC 1384576
- "Lexington". Kentucky State Gazetteer and Business Directory. R.L. Polk & Co. 1876.
- Z. Harrison (1878), "Lexington", Description of the Cincinnati Southern Railway from Cincinnati to Chattanooga, Cincinnati: Spencer & Craig printing works, OCLC 13741078
- "Lexington", Kentucky State Gazetteer and Business Directory, Detroit: R. L. Polk & Co., 1881
- "Lexington" . Encyclopædia Britannica. Vol. 14 (9th ed.). 1882.
- George Washington Ranck (1883), Guide to Lexington, Kentucky, Lexington, Ky: Transylvania Printing and Publishing Company, OCLC 12630056, OL 271586M

=== Published in 20th century ===
- "Lexington (Kentucky)" . Encyclopædia Britannica. Vol. 16 (11th ed.). 1910. p. 526.
- Federal Writers' Project (1938). Lexington and the Bluegrass Country. American Guide Series. Lexington: E.M. Glass – via HathiTrust.
- Federal Writers' Project (1939), "Lexington", Kentucky, American Guide Series, New York: Harcourt, Brace and Company, OCLC 498232 – via Internet Archive
- Ory Mazar Nergal, ed. (1980), "Lexington, KY", Encyclopedia of American Cities, New York: E.P. Dutton, OL 4120668M
- John E. Kleber, ed. (1992). "Lexington". Kentucky Encyclopedia. University Press of Kentucky. pp. 549+. ISBN 0-8131-2883-8.
- George Thomas Kurian (1994), "Lexington, Kentucky", World Encyclopedia of Cities, vol. 1: North America, Santa Barbara, Calif.: ABC-CLIO, OL 1431653M – via Internet Archive (fulltext)
- "The South: Kentucky: Lexington", USA, Let's Go, New York: St. Martin's Press, 1999, OL 24937240M
- Bernard Mayo. "Lexington: Frontier Metropolis" in Historiography and Urbanization ed by Eric F. Goldman. (1941)) pp 21-42. online

=== Published in 21st century ===
- Gerald L. Smith (2002). Lexington, Kentucky. Black America. Charleston, South Carolina: Arcadia.
- Hollingsworth, Randolph (2004). Lexington: Queen of the Bluegrass. The Making of America. Charleston, SC: Arcadia Publishing.
- Shawn Gillen (2010). "'The urge to merge:' the consolidation of Lexington and Fayette County, Kentucky". In Suzanne M. Leland; Kurt Thurmaier (eds.). City-County Consolidation: Promises Made, Promises Kept?. Georgetown University Press. ISBN 978-1-58901-622-4.
