= Cityscape of Lexington, Kentucky =

Architecture and urbanism in Lexington, Kentucky (USA)

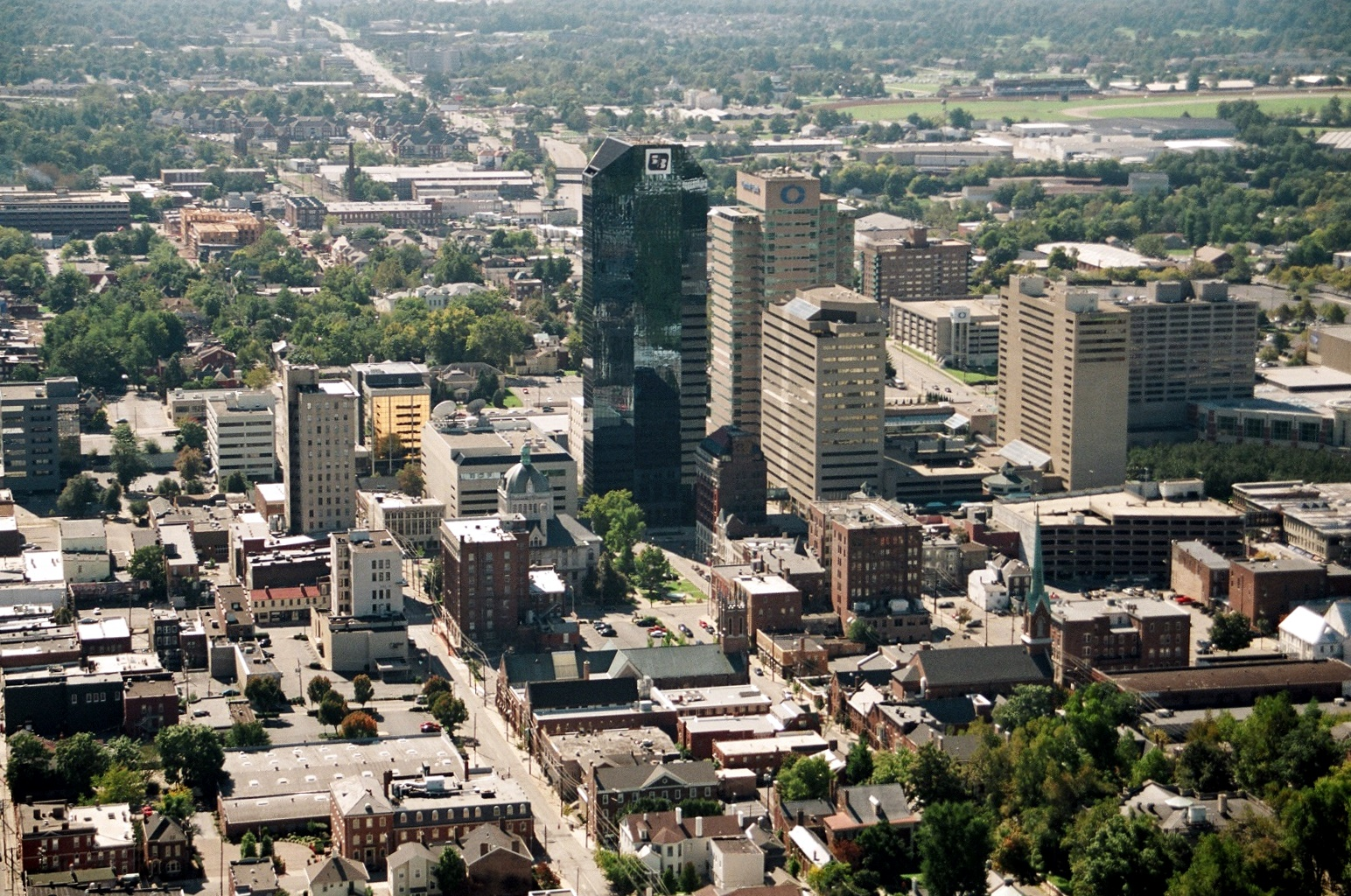
Skyline of Lexington

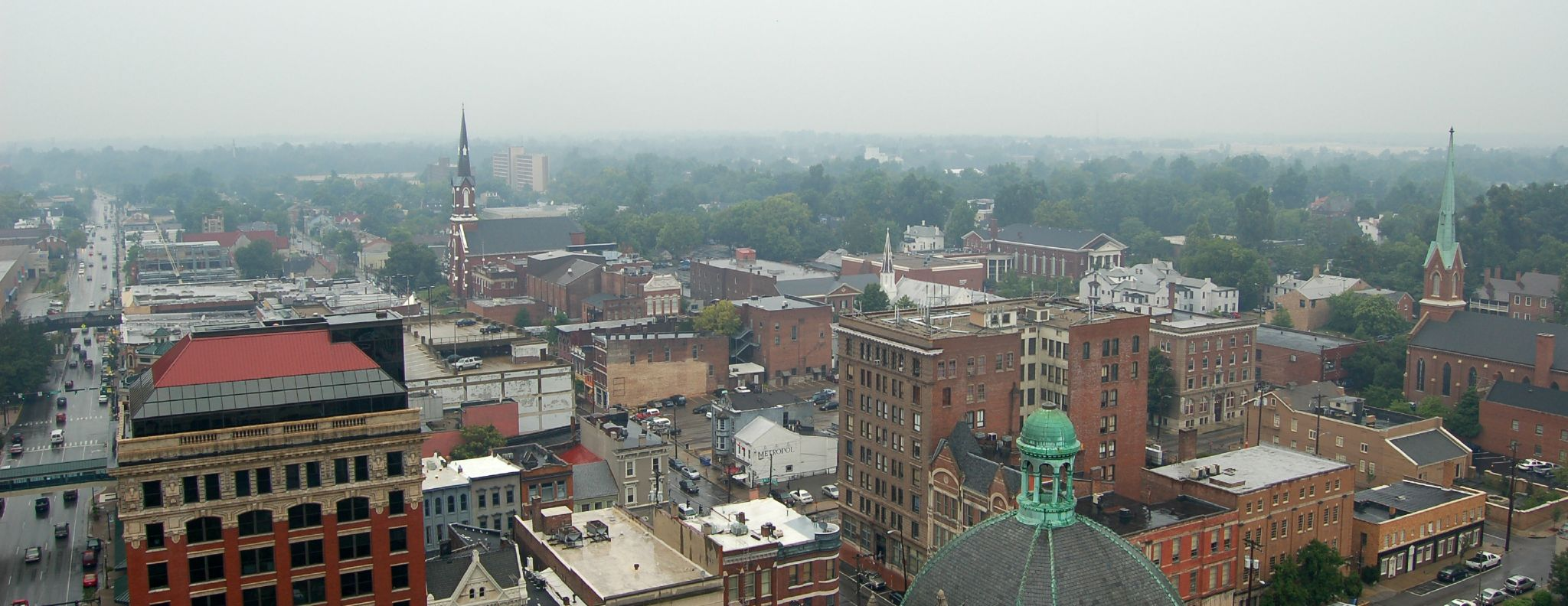
A portion of downtown Lexington in 2006.

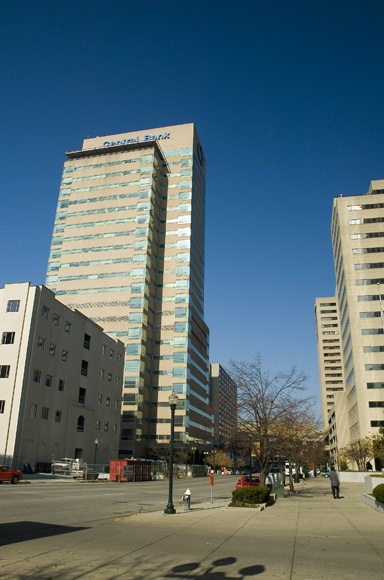
Kincaid Towers along Vine Street.

The urban development patterns of Lexington, Kentucky, confined within an urban growth boundary protecting its famed horse farms, include greenbelts and expanses of land between it and the surrounding towns. This has been done to preserve the region's horse farms and the unique Bluegrass landscape, which bring millions of dollars to the city through the horse industry and tourism. Urban growth is also tightly restricted in the adjacent counties, with the exception of Jessamine County, with development only allowed inside existing city limits. In order to prevent rural subdivisions and large homes on expansive lots from consuming the Bluegrass landscape, Fayette and all surrounding counties have minimum lot size requirements, which range from 10 acres (40,000 m^{2}) in Jessamine to fifty in Fayette.

Because the farmland in the southern part of the county consisted more of tobacco farms than pastures for raising horses and thus was considered "replaceable", most of Lexington's growth has been historically concentrated south of the downtown area. As a result, more than seventy percent of today's population lives south of US 60. Until the mid-1990s, most of the growth occurred in the southwest between US 68 (Harrodsburg Road) and KY 1974 (Tates Creek Road). Today, new development continues to the Madison and Clark County lines in a southeasterly direction along the Interstate 75 and US 60 (Winchester Road) corridors. Of the surrounding counties, the greatest growth is occurring in the counties through which Interstate 75 and US 27 pass, such as Scott County, Madison County and Jessamine County. Clark County and Woodford County are experiencing moderate growth, and Bourbon County is stagnant, with almost no growth. More recently, growth has begun to leapfrog the adjacent counties, with rapid increases in suburban development in Anderson County, to the west of Woodford County along the Bluegrass Parkway and also in the commuter belt of the state capital of Frankfort; and Garrard County, to the south of Jessamine along US 27.

In addition to rampant suburban growth, downtown Lexington is seeing a large building boom, with the revitalization of many historical structures and the construction of many new ones. Much of the development utilizes urban infill techniques such as the filling in of parking lots and high-density or out-of-character structures. Several new projects, such as South Hill Station Lofts and University Lofts, are taking advantage of now-disused tobacco warehouses along the South Broadway corridor.

== Downtown district ==
=== Major structures ===
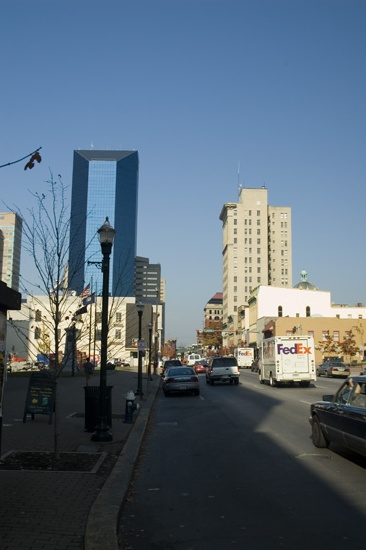
Looking down East Main Street in downtown Lexington. The "Big Blue" building on the left is the Lexington Financial Center.

In 1976, the city became a focal point for entertainment and businesses alike when the Lexington Center (now known as the Central Bank Center) opened at Vine, Main, High Streets and Broadway. Incorporating a convention center, Rupp Arena, a shopping mall, and the Hyatt Regency into one large development parcel, it was the largest development of its kind in the United States when it was completed.

In 1979, the 22-story Kincaid Towers highrise at Vine and Broadway was completed. This modern structure would remain the tallest building in central Kentucky for the next eight years. Upon completion, it was home to Kentucky Central Insurance Companies, but today it houses Central Bank among other corporations.

In 1982, the World Trade Center and Radisson Plaza Hotel (now Hilton) opened. The World Trade Center is a 243,000 sq ft (22,600 m^{2}). business complex; the Hilton is a 250,000 sq ft (23,000 m^{2})., 368 room hotel. Two years later, the Woodlands, an upscale condominium project with a restaurant, was completed.

In 1987, the tallest structure in Lexington was completed. The Lexington Financial Center, a 410 feet (125 m), 31 floor highrise that was completed on a site bounded by South Mill, Main and Vine Streets. It currently houses the regional headquarters of Fifth Third Bank among other financial institutions and is located between Main and Vine Street.

Also during 1987, Park Plaza, a 202 unit 22 story residential high-rise between Main and Vine Streets, adjacent to Phoenix Park and S. Limestone Street, opened. It features an eight-story parking garage and is connected to the Lexington Public Library. Park Plaza was completed in 1987 while the five story library was completed in 1988. It was constructed on the site of the former Phoenix Hotel that was demolished by Wallace Wilkinson for the World Coal Center. When that idea failed, he constructed what is now Park Plaza and the new Phoenix Park.

=== Other notable structures ===
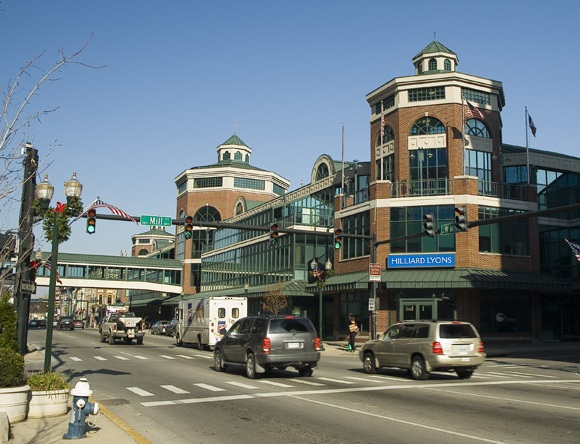
Triangle Center along East Main.

In 1980, the new office and production plant of the Lexington Herald-Leader was completed at the east end of downtown at Midland, Vine and East Main streets. The near-160,000-square-foot (15,000 m^{2}) facility is on a 6-acre (24,000 m^{2}) plot, with large windows that offer an interior glimpse at the massive printing presses and other industrial equipment.

In 1985, the Lexington Chamber of Commerce relocated to 330 East Main Street along what is now Rose Street. The three-story glass and granite structure, completed for $2.1 million, was a construction project by the Webb Cos.; it was formerly a Kentucky Central Life Insurance Co. parking lot. The West Vine Place office tower was also completed that year, featuring a polished granite facade along West Vine Street near the corner of South Limestone. During that year, renovations to an entire block of historic structures was completed; it was named Victorian Square and is now known as The Square, and contains upscale restaurants, clothing shops, and art galleries.

In 1986, Festival Market opened. Today it is known as the Triangle Center. Originally envisioned as a shopping and dining complex, it now houses offices along with several restaurants and a coffee shop.

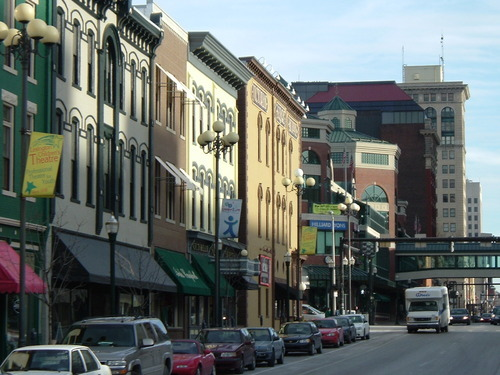
The Square in Downtown Lexington

In 1987, developers announced that the former Ades Dry Goods Building at 249 East Main Street, was to become a mixed-use development parcel. The "experiment in Manhattan-style living" culminated in the renovation of the existing structure. Renovations began in January 1988 with a $1.2 million Urban Development Action Grant, with the city providing $240,000 towards the project; the remainder of the $5.7 million project consisted of "bank loans and private equity." Retail space, now home to an upscale restaurant, was located on the first floor, while professional offices were located on the second and third floors. Loft apartments were constructed on the fourth floor.

In February 1988, Goodwin Square opened at Main and Vine Streets. A stately brick structure outlined in copper, it was constructed near the Woodlands, and features 35,000 sq ft (3,300 m^{2}). of retail and 13,000 sq ft (1,200 m^{2}). of professional office space.

The Government Center parking garage is adjacent to the Lexington-Fayette Urban County Government building.

=== Never completed ===
One major project that was only partially realized was the Lexington Transit Center development, which was to include a residential apartment structure on top between High and Vine Streets. Another structure never completed as originally conceived was the Galleria. It was a proposed 24 level glass skyscraper that would have included retail shops and offices. It would have been constructed around the Blue Grass Shade Company at 124 South Mill and McAdams and Morford Drugs at 200 West Main Street. The project, initiated in 1983, was never constructed.

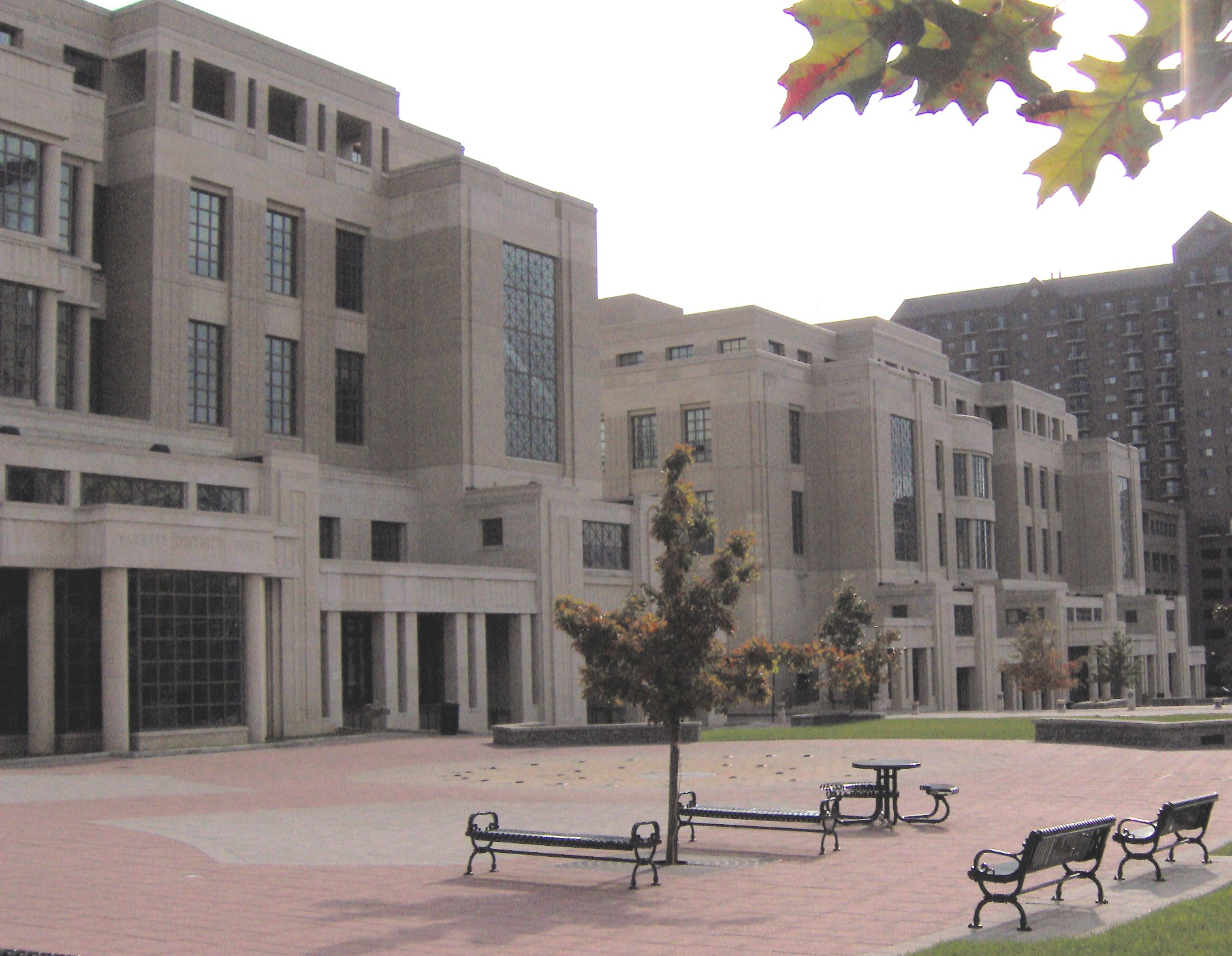
The Robert F. Stephens Courthouse was constructed on the proposed site of the Ben Ali Apartments

Another tabled project was the Ben Ali Apartments complex; financing problems had also killed the project. The site is part of the land occupied by the Fayette County Courthouse today. Gameday Center was a fairly recent project that was planned to anchor the South Broadway corridor, however, land compatibility issues prevented this project.

The largest failed development was the World Coal Center. The Phoenix Hotel was demolished in preparation for the skyscraper, however, it was never constructed; for years a pile of rubble stood marking the site.

One ambitious project that was never completed was the Lexington Sky Bridge Plaza. Proposed on October 11, 1984, it never progressed further than the design phases. Envisioned by two University of Kentucky professors, the civic space would have been located 14.5 feet (4.4 m) above the Harrison Avenue viaduct (now Martin Luther King Drive), and would have included a bandstand for live music, an outdoor cafe with meeting space, and a display area for local art scene. It would have included provisions for an ice-skating rink. The facility would have been constructed on four concrete piers that extend upward from the existing viaduct with two steel trusses and concrete brace supports. It was loosely modeled after the Belvedere along Interstate 64 in Louisville, Kentucky and Fountain Square in Cincinnati, Ohio.

=== New development ===
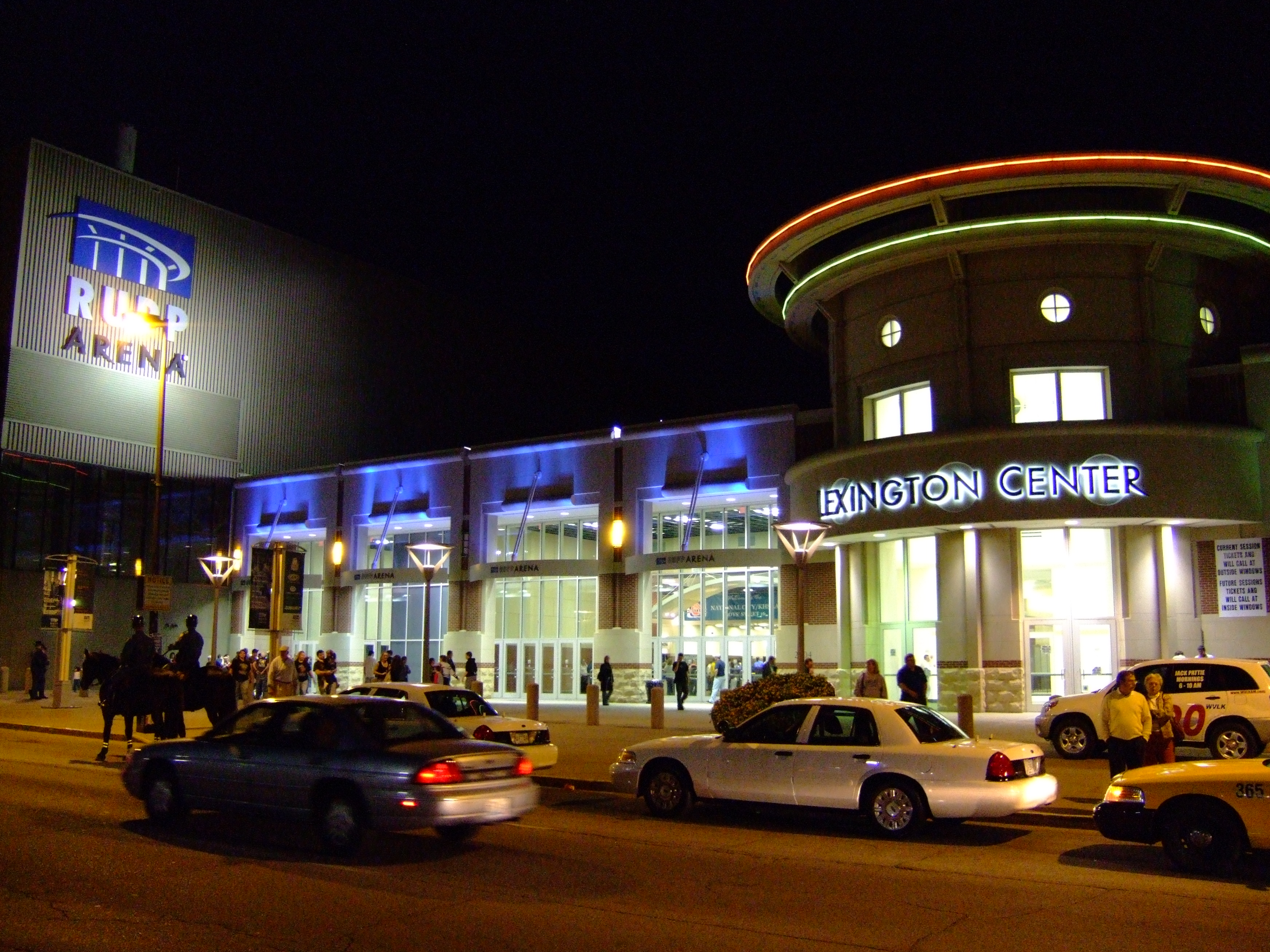
Rupp Arena and Central Bank Center

As the cost of land within the urban service boundary of Fayette County increases due to the diminishing amount of plots appropriate for development, and as people's interest in living downtown has seen a resurgence, several new projects are either in planning, under construction, or have already been finished.

Among the distinctive new developments along Main Street is the 500's on the Main located across from the Central Bank Center and adjacent to The Square. It is a residential and commercial project that will feature a tall sweeping spire and a clock, and will encompass an entire city square block. Included will be 10 penthouses, 54 loft condominiums, 12 retail stores, an urban grocery convenience store and a rooftop restaurant.

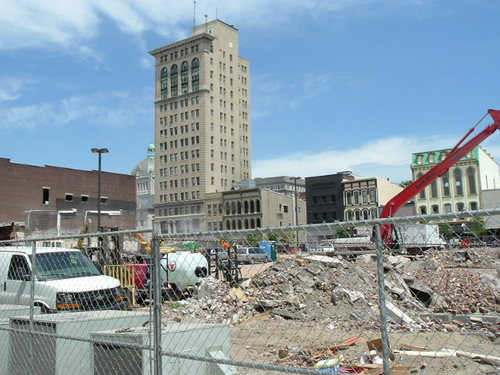
Demolition of former buildings at the CentrePointe construction site in August 2008

Construction of Fairmont on Main, a luxury townhouse development in the 600 block of West Main Street, began in 2004 and was completed in 2006. Across the street is NewPast on Main, an environmentally friendly loft project that follows the "EarthCraft" guidelines. The project features "sustainably manufactured materials, energy efficient systems, resource efficient building materials, geothermal heating and cooling, and passive solar design techniques." Fourteen new loft condominiums, three renovated lofts, and a gate house are part of this project.

Construction on Main+Rose was completed in 2007, featuring 96 residential condominiums with 25,000 square feet (2,300 m^{2}) for retail ventures. The site, at 337 East Main, was formerly the Downtown Motor Inn, abandoned in the mid-1980s.

In 2006 renovation and new construction began on the Nunn Building. The Nunn Building was originally constructed in 1917 for the Lexington Herald. The original structure has been remodeled with a new addition completed in 2007 to provide 26 residential lofts condominiums. |

=== Tallest buildings ===
Building	Height	Floors	Year completed/projected	Status
Lexington Financial Center	410 ft (125 m)	30	1987	Completed
Kincaid Towers	333 ft (101.5 m)	22	1979	Completed
Blanding Tower (UK)	264 ft (80.5 m)	23	1967	Completed; demolished in 2020
Kirwan Tower (UK)	264 ft (80.5 m)	23	1967	Completed; demolished in 2020
Patterson Office Tower (UK)	250 ft (76.2 m)	20	1968	Completed
Hilton Hotel	240 ft (73.2 m)	23	1978	Completed
Vine Center	233 ft (71 m)	23	1982	Completed
Park Plaza Apartments	213 ft (65 m)	22	1987	Completed
City Center	200 ft (61 m) (Estimate)	12	2019	Completed
Chase Bank Plaza	200 ft (61 m)	15	1973	Completed
Fayette National Bank Building	200 ft (61 m)	15	1914	Completed
Hyatt Regency Hotel	190 ft (58 m)	17	1977	Completed
National City Plaza	173 ft (52.7 m)	13	1975	Completed
LFUCG Government Center	160 ft (48.8 m)	12	1921	Completed
Christ Church Apartments	149 ft (45.4 m)	12	1971	Completed
Albert B. Chandler Hospital (Pavilion A)	130 ft (39.6 m)	12	2010	Completed

== Chevy Chase district ==
The Chevy Chase district, centered around the intersection of East High Street, Euclid Avenue, and Fontaine Road, hosts a collection of small boutique shops, restaurants, and a television station. It contains notable structures such as the Ashland Plaza buildings and many stately homes.

The area has a community magazine, titled the Chevy Chaser Magazine.

== University of Kentucky ==
The University of Kentucky is home to many notable structures, including one high-rise. Demolition of two other high-rises began in May 2020 and was completed later that year.

The tallest building on campus is the 18-story Patterson Office Tower, near the administrative center of campus. Constructed in 1968, the 250-foot (76.2 m) building houses faculty offices, numerous conference rooms, and several computer labs. It is adjacent to the lowrise White Hall classroom building.

Prior to their 2020 demolition, the tallest campus structures had been Kirwan Tower and Blanding Tower, twin 23-story towers that housed undergraduate students for nearly 50 years before being decommissioned. Completed in 1967 along with the rest of what had been the university's largest student housing area, the Kirwan–Blanding Complex, the towers were 264 feet (80.5 m) tall. The towers were decommissioned as student housing in 2016, with the surrounding low-rise residence halls being decommissioned a year later, and the entire Complex was demolished in a project that started in 2020 and continued into early 2021 (delayed from the originally planned 2018 schedule).

== Gallery ==
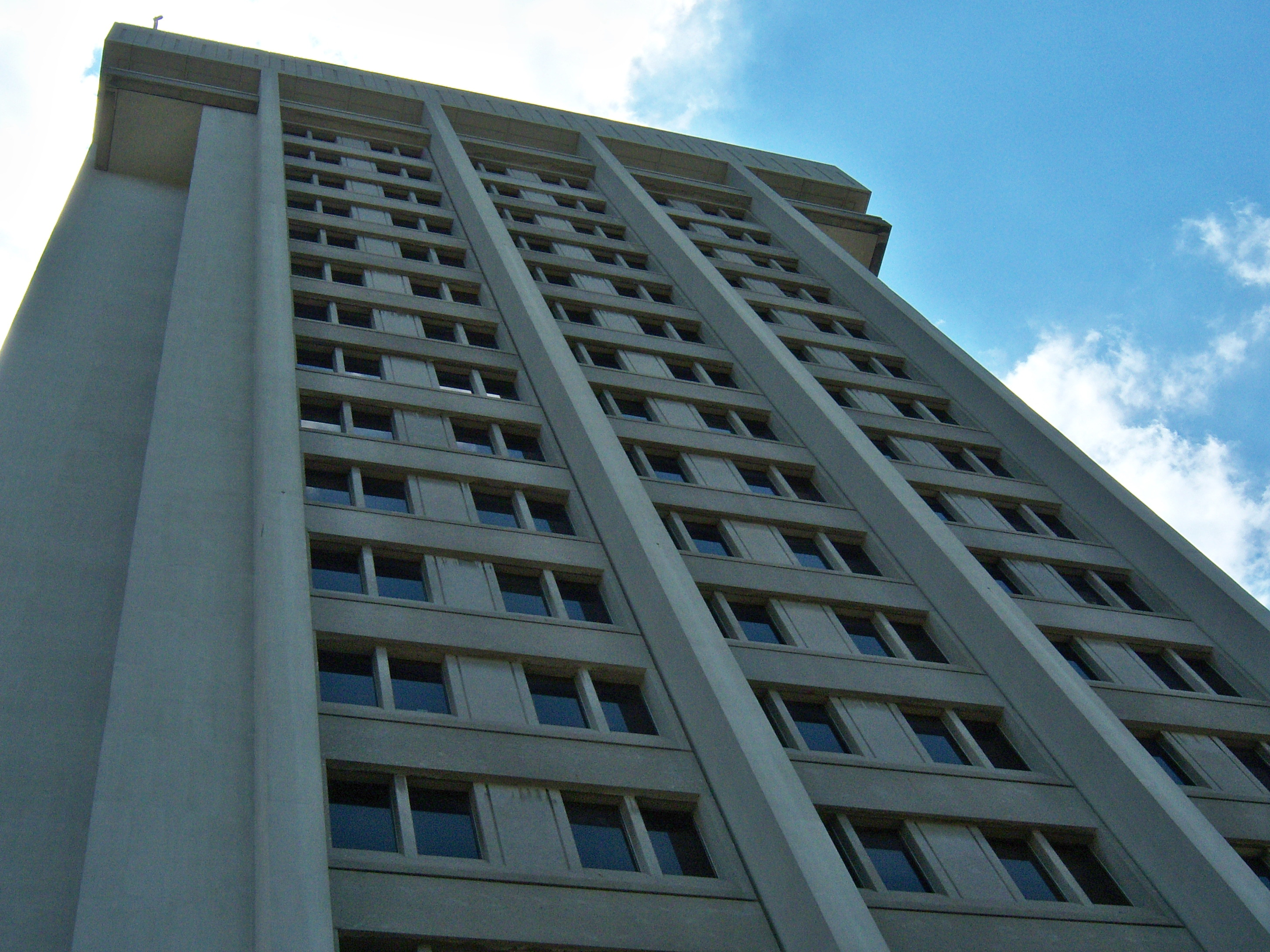
Patterson Office Tower, the city's third-tallest building.

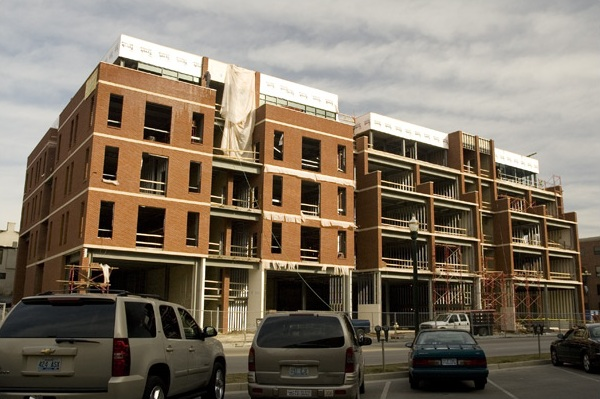
Windows being installed on the 500's on the Main project along West Main Street.

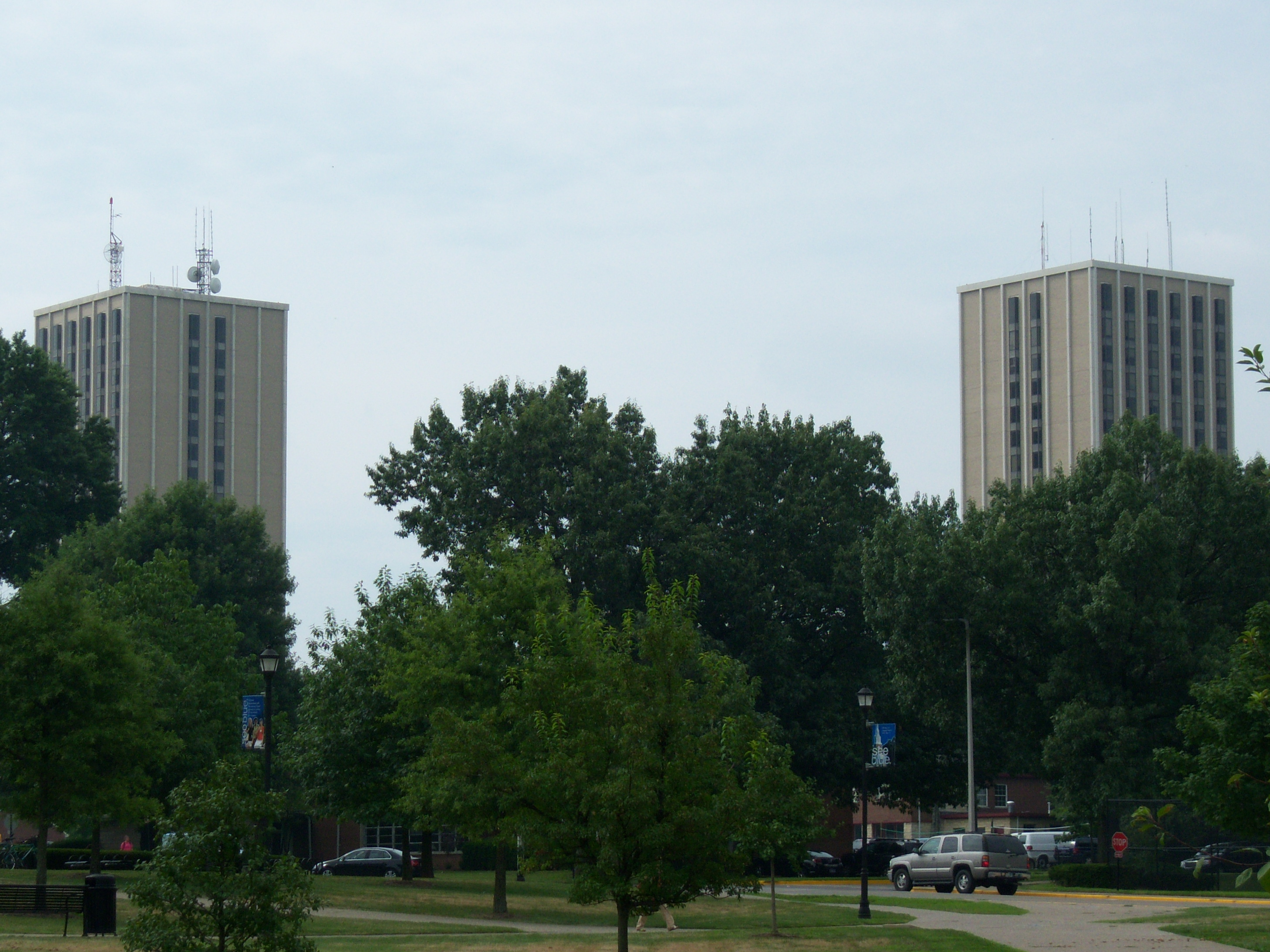
The iconic Kirwan and Blanding Towers, demolished in 2020.

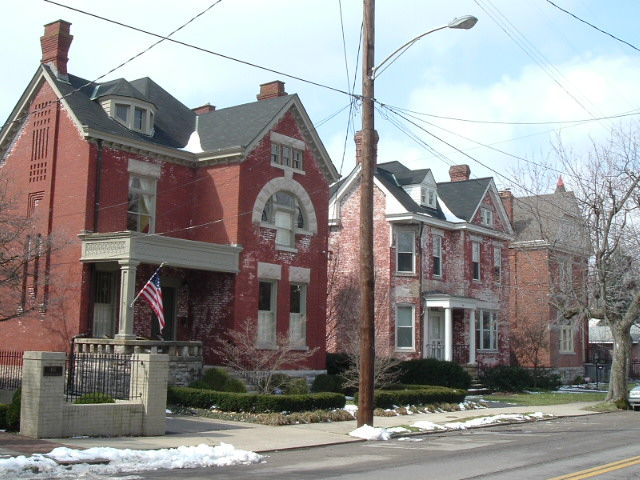
Third Street in north Lexington.
