= World Coal Center =

Coordinates: 38.0454°N 84.4967°W

The World Coal Center was a proposed skyscraper in Lexington, Kentucky where the Phoenix Hotel had once stood at South Limestone, East Main Street and East Vine Street. The $100.5 million project would have included the 41-level skyscraper and a retail shopping center. It is today home to the main branch of the Lexington Public Library, Park Plaza Apartments and Phoenix Park.

== History ==
Wallace Wilkinson, who later became Governor of Kentucky, had proposed the World Coal Center for Lexington in the early 1980s. In 1981, Wilkinson purchased the Phoenix Hotel and demolished it in hopes that the 41-floor skyscraper would be constructed on the site.

The property would remain a rubble-filled site until 1984, when Wilkinson proposed that a temporary park be constructed over what had become known as "Lake Wilkinson." He proposed benches with tables, a "meandering path" constructed of crushed brick and stone from the old hotel, three entrance plazas, a small amphitheater, several shade trees, and fountains that would replace the demolished hotel until a suitable structure could be erected in its place. This announcement came before the finals for the NCAA basketball tournament that was to be held in Rupp Arena in 1985.

The World Coal Center by this time had been reduced to a 25 floor high-rise.

It was joked that the park be named after the Phoenix Hotel since it will "rise from the rubble" that had covered the property. Ironically, the park that did replace part of the old hotel site was named Phoenix Park.

== See also ==
- Cityscape of Lexington, Kentucky
