= Lexington Financial Center =

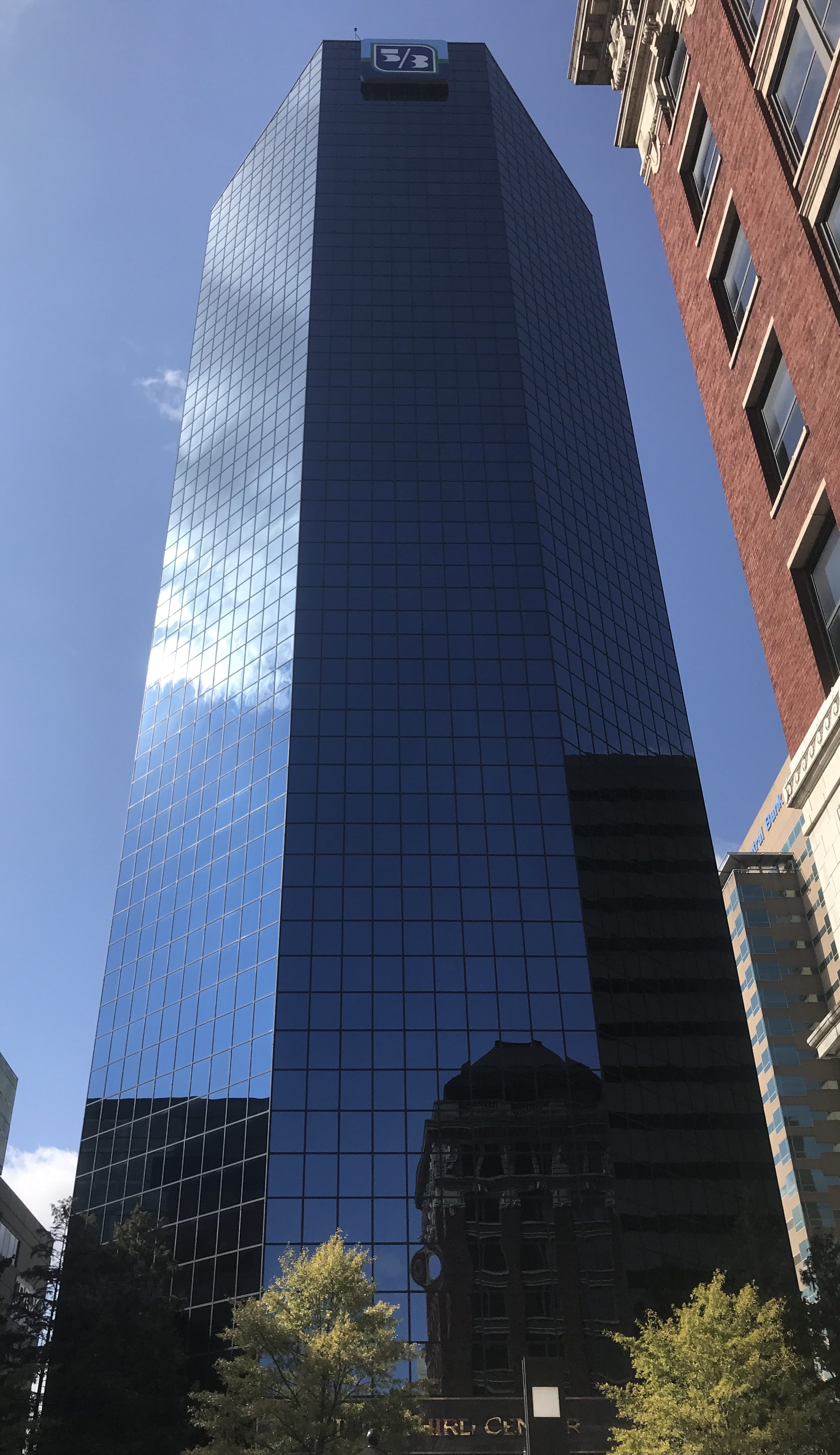
- Interactive map of the Lexington Financial Center area

General information
- Status: Completed
- Type: Office
- Location: 250 West Main St. Lexington, Kentucky 40507
- Coordinates: 38°02′51″N 84°29′56″W
- Opening: 1987; 39 years ago

Height
- Roof: 410 feet (125 m)

Technical details
- Floor count: 31
- Floor area: 357,362 sq ft (33,200.0 m^{2})

Design and construction
- Developer: The Webb Companies

The Lexington Financial Center, locally known as "Fifth Third" or the "Big Blue Building", is a 357,361-square-foot (33,199.9 m^{2}), 410-foot (120 m), 31-floor high-rise in Lexington, Kentucky. It is located between Vine Street and Main Street at South Mill Street. Its exterior features blue tinted glass that has become an identifying symbol for the downtown.

It was originally proposed as a 26-story skyscraper in 1984 across from the Vine Center and replaced the failed project, the Galleria.

$7.5 million in state aid was announced by then-Governor Martha Layne Collins towards the construction of a six-level parking structure that would serve Triangle Center and the Lexington Financial Center.

Construction was completed in 1987. Upon completion, it housed the Webb Company, the Bank of Lexington, Sherman, Carter, Barnhart Architects and a law firm. Today, it houses the Fifth Third Bank among other financial institutions, including Kentucky Employers' Mutual Insurance

== See also ==
- Cityscape of Lexington, Kentucky – Architecture and urbanism in Lexington, Kentucky (USA)
