= 1961 Boston Celtics boycott =

1961 protest against racial injustice

On 17 October 1961, five African-American basketball players of the Boston Celtics and two from the St. Louis Hawks boycotted a National Basketball Association exhibition game between the teams in Lexington, Kentucky, after facing racial discrimination in the city. The game proceeded as scheduled, with the Hawks winning 128–103.

== Background ==
Two black players, Sam Jones and Satch Sanders, went to a coffee shop at the Phoenix Hotel on arriving in town, where a waitress refused to serve them. "I'm sorry but we don't serve Negroes," the NBA champion Boston Celtics were told. Later, Hawks player Cleo Hill was also denied service. The Celtics players informed Bill Russell of this incident, and the three along with K.C. Jones, rookie Al Butler and Hawks players Woody Sauldsberry and Hill decided to leave Kentucky in protest. Coach Red Auerbach argued the players should stay, but ultimately agreed to drive them to the airport. According to the AP, the hotel manager at the time, Art Lang, said the hotel did not have “discriminatory policies,” and the refusal of service was a "misunderstanding."

On arriving in Boston, Russell stated to the media: "Negroes are in a fight for their rights – a fight for survival in a changing world... I am with these Negroes."

== See also ==
- Racial segregation in the United States
- 1965–66 Texas Western Miners men's basketball team
- Glory Road, 2006 film about Texas Western's win against Kentucky
