= Phoenix Hotel (Lexington, Kentucky) =

Building in Lexington, Kentucky, United States

Coordinates: 38.045908°N 84.496979°W

The Phoenix Hotel was a historical structure located on East Main Street in Lexington, Kentucky, United States. It was established in the 1820s and became a prominent landmark as well as the oldest hostelry by succession in the area. After several reincarnations, the hotel closed in 1977. The building was demolished in 1987 and replaced by Phoenix Park.

== History ==
The site that would become the Phoenix Hotel originally housed Postlethwaite's Tavern, which was constructed in 1800. Several name changes occurred between 1800 and 1820, one of which was to Wilson's Tavern, which was visited by Col. Aaron Burr in 1806. The Phoenix Hotel opened on this site in the 1820s. After it was established, the hotel quickly became a well-known landmark. As a prominent structure closely linked with travelers and tourism in the early history of the city, it helped to give Lexington the reputation that led it to be called "Athens of the West".

=== 19th century ===
The Phoenix Hotel was used for many other purposes, including use as a headquarters by Union General William "Bull" Nelson as well as Confederate Generals Braxton Bragg and General Kirby Smith during the American Civil War. Additionally, the Morgan's Men Association was formed at the Phoenix Hotel after the reinterment of Confederate General John Hunt Morgan on 17 April 1868. The surviving members of Morgan's command served as the funeral escort and then met at the hotel. It was at this meeting that the Morgan's Men Association was created, which still exists in modern times. Around 1891, the Alpha Theta chapter of the Kappa Alpha Order at Transylvania University was founded, with the charter members being initiated at the Phoenix Hotel.

A postcard from this era on display at the Lexington History Museum reads:

We Make a specialty of serving private parties High-class Service, 40c Lunch, PHOENIX HOTEL, Fireproof, Lexington, Ky.

Lucretia Hart Clay, the wife of statesman Henry Clay, had business ventures selling eggs, butter and milk to the Phoenix Hotel during the 19th century.

=== 20th century ===
In November 1915 the Phoenix Hotel was the meeting site for the Kentucky Equal Rights Association. After an automobile parade down Lexington's Main Street on the afternoon of November 8, the suffragists gathered for an afternoon reception at Ashland (Henry Clay estate). That evening at the Old Opera House on North Broadway, Lexington Mayor J.E. Cassidy welcomed the group and they listened to a lecture by Ethel Snowden, of London, England. On November 9, the meeting opened in the Ball Room of the Phoenix Hotel with Madeline McDowell Breckinridge as president. The convention offered several other items of interest to the whole community, including a presentation by Madame Rosika Schwimmer of Hungary on the international peace movement.

In 1919, the Kiwanis Club of Lexington was inaugurated at the Phoenix Hotel. A meeting was held by 50 businessmen to organize the club. At the time, election of officers was postponed until the second meeting, which was also scheduled to take place at the hotel. Among those present were Senator Thomas A. Combs, who presided over the meeting, and Mayor-elect T.C. Bradley. National conventions of the Phi Kappa Tau fraternity were hosted by chapters at Centre College, Transylvania University and the University of Kentucky at the hotel from August 30-September 1, 1923, and August 22–24, 1929.

In 1929, a meeting of Lexington's Board of Commerce at the Phoenix Hotel resulted in staff executive Ed Wilder writing a letter to convince the U.S. Public Health Service to locate a prison in the area following the enabling of the Porter Act. Dr. Walter Treadway later visited Lexington to acknowledge the city's interest in housing this facility as a result of the brainstorming done at the hotel.

In 1932, the exterior lights from either side of the front entrance of the Phoenix Hotel were relocated to the main building of the University of Kentucky after a street front renovation. Shortly after 1947, the radio station WVLK-AM 590 relocated to the Phoenix Hotel from Versailles, Kentucky. The radio station remained headquartered at the site until approximately 1980, and moved thereafter to the Kincaid Towers. During this time, Paul Dunbar was the chief engineer.

The Southern Regional Group held an annual meeting at the Phoenix Hotel in 1965, from October 7 to October 9. This meeting was principally hosted by the University of Kentucky, and had 110 in attendance. It became the last meeting of the group where Kentucky was an active, full member.

The hotel's policy was racial segregation. In the 1960s, the Phoenix Hotel was also the site of several demonstrations during the Civil Rights Movement in Lexington. The two local newspapers, the Lexington Herald and the Lexington Leader, refused to cover the movement. This was acknowledged in 2004. These demonstrations were depicted in black and white photographs taken by photographer Calvert McAnn, and were displayed at the University of Kentucky Singletary Center in 2005.

The October 17, 1960 boycott by the Boston Celtics resulted after Celtic players were refused service at the hotel coffee shop because of being Black. The NBA champions were scheduled for an exhibition game against St. Louis Battlehawks. Tom “Satch” Sanders and Sam Jones were informed by the restaurant hostess that "We don't serve Negroes." When Bill Russell and Black teammates Al Butler, K.C. Jones were told, they refused to play. Black members of the Battlehawks, Woody Sauldsberry and Cleo Hill also refused.

== Influence on horse racing ==
The prominence of the Phoenix Hotel heavily influenced horse racing, as shown by several races carrying the name of the hotel. The Phoenix Hotel Stakes, which was first run in Lexington in 1831, is considered the oldest American horse race for three-year-olds.

Headlines and articles from The New York Times mention several races and titles in horse racing that were named for the Phoenix Hotel, beginning in or before 1877. An article from The New York Times printed November 12, 1924, described an opening-day feature in Lexington horse racing named the "Phoenix Hotel Handicap", at a mile and seventy yards for three-year-olds and upward". This occurred during a meeting of the Kentucky Association's Lexington Race Course. Similar headlines from 1930 also mention the Phoenix Hotel Handicap in racing.

The Phoenix Hotel Stakes race was later renamed the Phoenix Breeders' Cup Handicap (currently listed as the Phoenix Stakes), and is run at Keeneland.

== Demolition ==
The Phoenix Hotel was demolished in 1981 by Wallace Wilkinson, who planned to use the site to construct the World Coal Center skyscraper. This was never constructed, and is considered the largest failed development in the cityscape of Lexington. In its place, the Park Plaza was opened in 1987, followed by the construction and opening of the modern-day Phoenix Park.

Two large crystal chandeliers were removed to the lobby of the Seelbach Hotel in Louisville.

Phoenix Park, which is located next to a public library, features a Vietnam veterans memorial, a fountain, and seating for visitors. James Holmberg, who is an author, historian, and curator for the Filson Club, participated in the dedication of a marker honoring the historical significance of the site in November 2006. The site of the former Phoenix Hotel was given a Lexington Historical Society marker, in honor of a large celebration that occurred when Meriwether Lewis (of the Lewis and Clark Expedition) visited Lexington in 1806.
