= Central Bank Center =

Entertainment, convention and sports complex in Lexington, Kentucky

Coordinates: 38°02′58″N 84°30′10″W

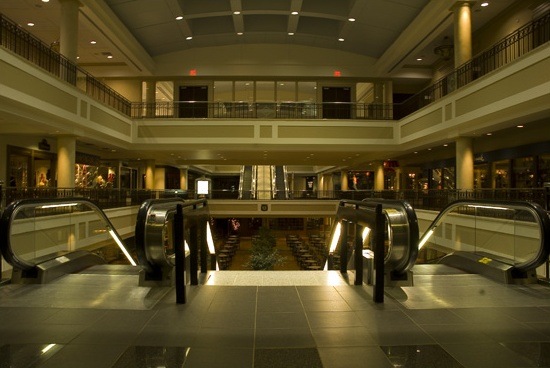
- The Shops at Lexington Center
- Interactive map of Central Bank Center
- Former names: Lexington Civic Center; Lexington Center
- Location: 430 West Vine Street; Lexington, Kentucky, United States
- Owner: Lexington–Fayette Urban County Government
- Operator: Lexington Center Corporation
- Surface: Multi-surface

Construction
- Opened: 1976
- General contractor: Hunt Construction

The Central Bank Center (formerly known as Lexington Center) is an entertainment, convention and sports complex located on an 11-acre (45,000 m^{2}) site in downtown Lexington, Kentucky. It features a convention center, the Hyatt Regency Hotel, and Rupp Arena. It opened in 1976.

On January 27, 2020, it was announced that Lexington Center's overall naming rights were sold to Central Bank, a local community bank, by the Lexington Center Corporation and JMI Sports, which handles the multimedia rights for both the LCC and the University of Kentucky. The Rupp name will continue to receive primacy in the fourteen-year agreement for the arena portion of the complex, and be known as "Rupp Arena at Central Bank Center".

== Components ==
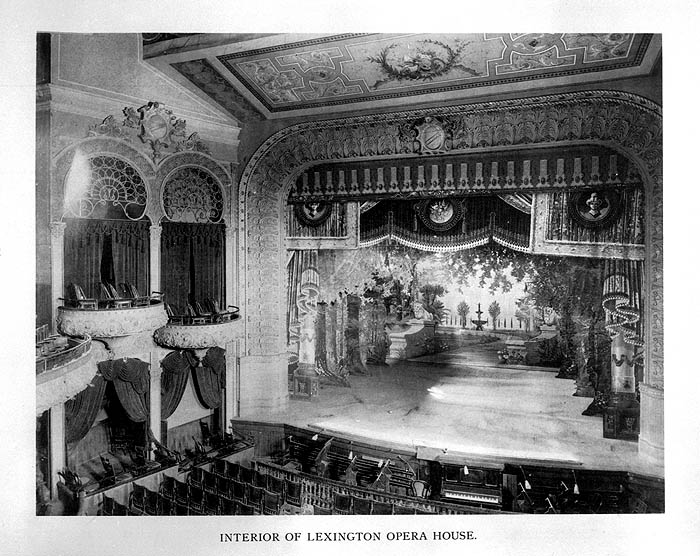
Interior of Opera House, 1898

- Rupp Arena, which at its opening in 1976 was the world's largest indoor arena, originally held 24,000. For much of the next 40-plus years, it remained the largest (by capacity) in the U.S. built specifically for basketball. During the 2019 basketball offseason, the capacity was reduced to 20,545 when nearly half of the original upper-level bleachers were replaced with chairback seating.
- The 1,000-seat Lexington Opera House, located at the corner of Broadway and Short Streets.
- A 366-room Hyatt Regency Hotel.
- A 100,000 square feet (9,300 m^{2}) convention center.
- 50,000 square feet (4,600 m^{2}) of meeting rooms and ballrooms.
- Triangle Park

== See also ==
- Cityscape of Lexington, Kentucky
