= City Center (Lexington) =

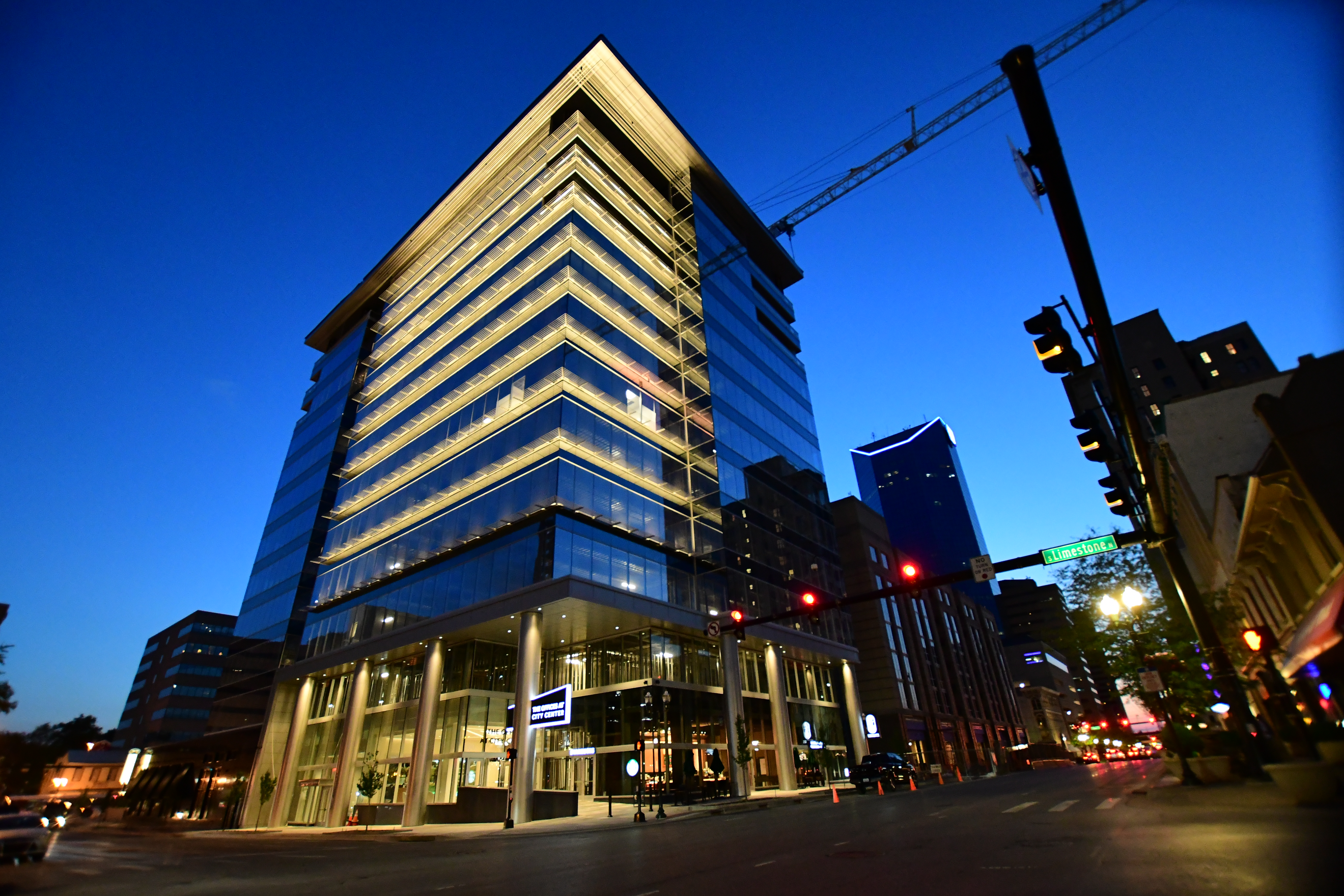
- Interactive map of the City Center area

General information
- Status: Completing Construction
- Type: Mixed use
- Location: Bound by W. Main, W. Vine, S. Upper, and S. Limestone Streets; Lexington, Kentucky, United States 40507, 100 W Main Street, 101 W Vine Street
- Coordinates: 38°2′47″N 84°29′52″W
- Construction started: December 2013
- Estimated completion: 2019
- Opening: 2020

Design and construction
- Architect: Rabun Architects
- Developer: The Webb Companies

Other information
- Parking: 700 Underground Spaces

City Center, formerly known as CentrePointe, is a residential, commercial, and retail building in downtown Lexington, Kentucky that opened in 2020. The plan consists of a 12-story office tower incorporating premium luxury condominiums in its top three floors, two hotels, retail spaces and an underground parking garage. The parking garage was completed in 2017.

== History ==
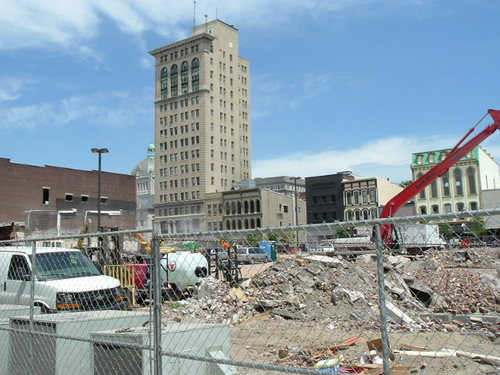
Demolition of former buildings at the City Center construction site in August 2008

The project launched in summer 2008, when the designers razed the existing historical buildings on the designated construction site. The original estimated time of completion was in 2010 as it was intended to serve as a centerpiece for business during the 2010 FEI World Equestrian Games. Before the construction of City Center began, many local residents objected to the project as it meant the destruction of Morton's Row, a historical row of buildings that were the city's second-oldest historical commercial district, and a local bar, The Dame. Morton's Row's buildings frequently had flooded basements due to Town Branch creek running below the neighborhood. The buildings were 100% occupied and operating as businesses before a local developer was approved to demolish the structures. In July 2008, the Fayette Alliance — a coalition of developers, neighborhood associations, and farmers — revoked its support for the building, due to an apparent reluctance on the part of the developer to work with concerned parties in addressing various issues concerning the development.

In addition to the controversy surrounding The Dame, debate arose regarding the use of Tax Increment Financing for the development. Initially concern centered on the application of taxpayer money without the inclusion of ideas from those taxpayers. This opposition arose mostly from a common misunderstanding of Tax Increment Financing, which utilizes the boom property tax value from a redevelopment project to fund improvements locally. The issue went before the city council in September 2008. The council voted in favor of utilizing Tax Increment Financing for the project due to the infrastructure improvements for the surrounding area including sidewalks and underground parking structures.

On June 25, 2009, the process of seeding and filling the City Center construction site began. On September 10, 2013, EOP, the architecture firm behind the fifth iteration of the City Center design announced they were pulling out of the project. Preliminary construction began in December 2013 and blasting for the parking structure and foundation began on March 17, 2014. The 700-space underground parking garage was expected to be completed by late summer 2014, but was not. Developers then attempted to sell $30 million in bonds solely devoted towards building the parking garage. Though construction on the parking garage was slow, the garage was ultimately finished in late 2017 and then first beam of the above-ground portion of the project was erected on December 19, 2017.

== Design evolution ==
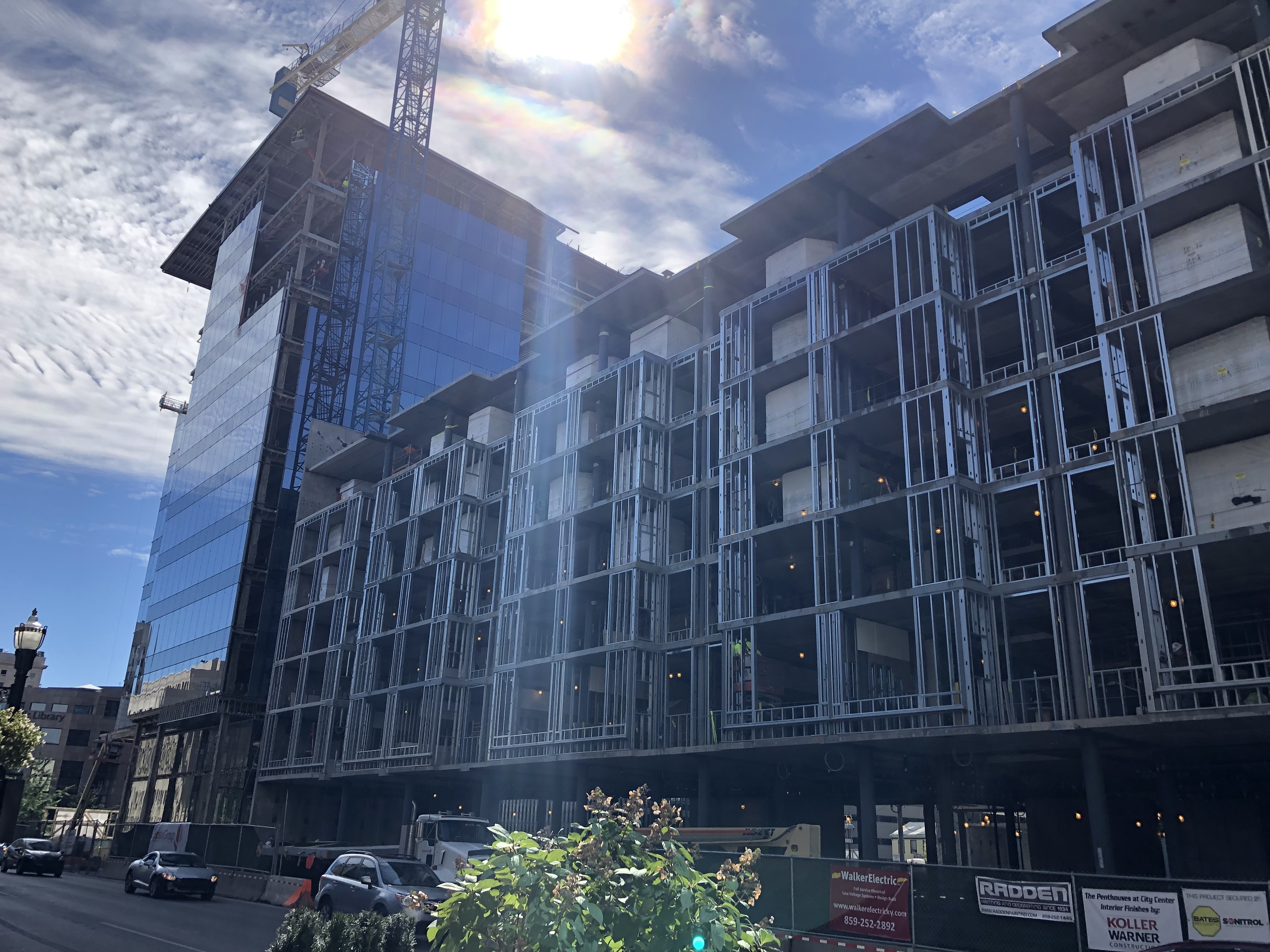
City Center construction progress October 2018

The original plan in 2008 called for a 35-story, 550-foot-tall (170 m) high rise which would include a hotel, condominiums, retail and office space. The entire development was estimated to cost $250 million and would have become the tallest building in Lexington upon completion. Three other proposed designs followed. The first two entailed one large building that would have covered the entire block. But after Studio Gang Architects became involved in the project in 2011, the latter two proposed designs have entailed one tower and several low rise buildings.

Jeanne Gang, lead architect of Studio Gang Architects, was hired to draft ideas for the City Center project in 2011. She proposed a 30-story tower which would include a ten-floor boutique hotel, ten floors of apartments, seven floors of condominiums, and three floors of penthouses. Her design also called for an eight-story building on the intersection of South Limestone Street and West Main Street along with a row of low rises on West Main Street.

In 2012, the Webb Companies released a design that resembled that of Studio Gang Architects. The proposed design included a 28-story hotel-condominium tower at the intersection of West Vine Street and South Upper Street, four smaller buildings on West Main Street, and a low-rise office building at South Limestone Street and West Main Street.

A revised 2013 plan downsized the main high rise from 28 to 19 floors. It included a 286-room hotel along with 96 apartments and 10,700 square feet of retail space on the ground floor. The office building was planned to have 157,710 square feet of offices as well as restaurants and retailers. The development was estimated to cost US$393.9 million.

The hotel-condominium tower was modified by architectural firm Rabun Rasche Rector Reece in 2014. A terrace on the twelfth floor of the tower was added along with a contemporary glass facade. The first eleven floors will serve as a 205-room Marriott hotel while the remaining seven floors are reserved for condominiums and penthouse suites. The plan for the apartment complex, originally to be seven floors, was revised to include twelve floors with retail on the first floor, 100 extended-stay suites on floors two through five, and apartments on floors six through twelve.

== Gallery ==
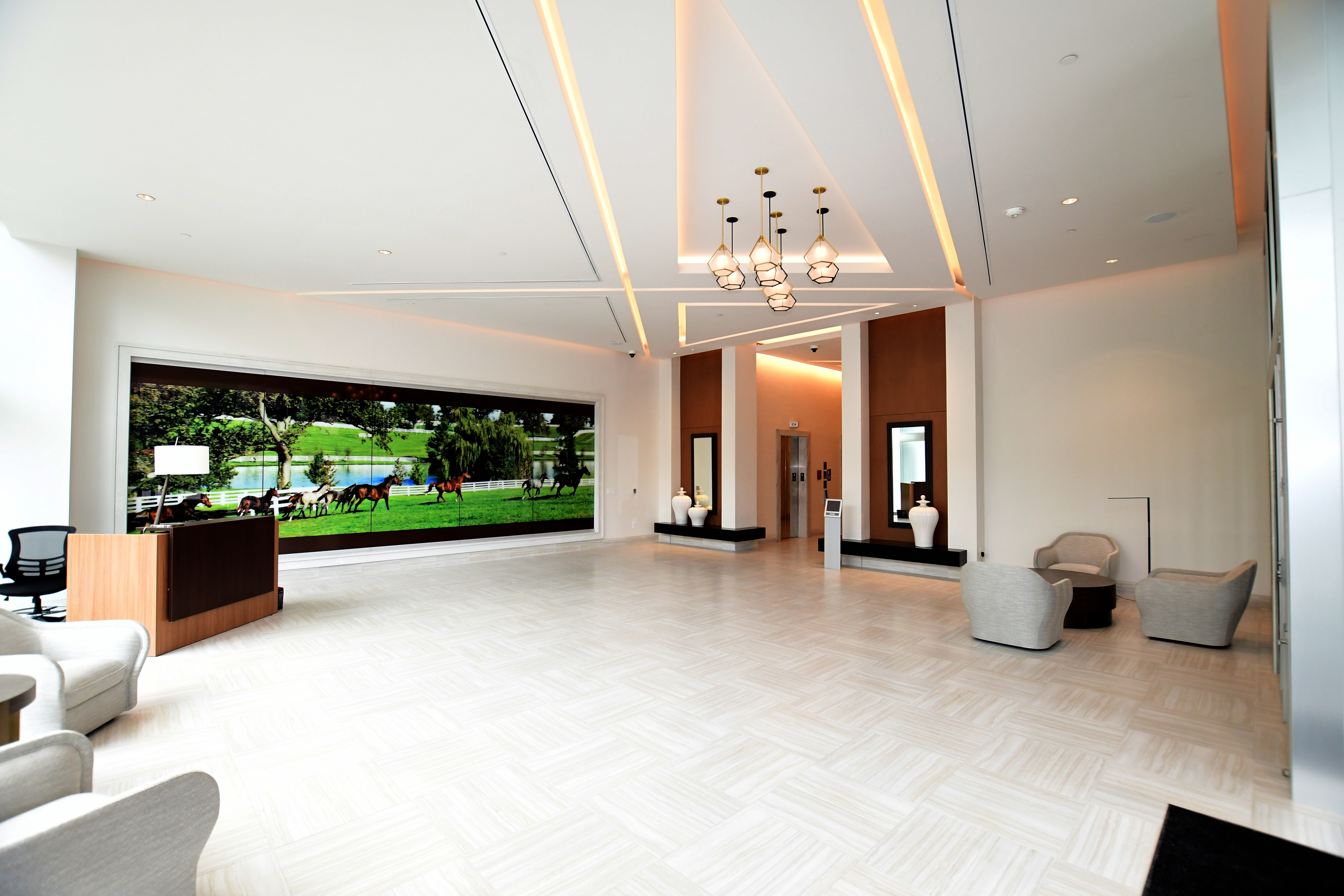
City Center's lobby

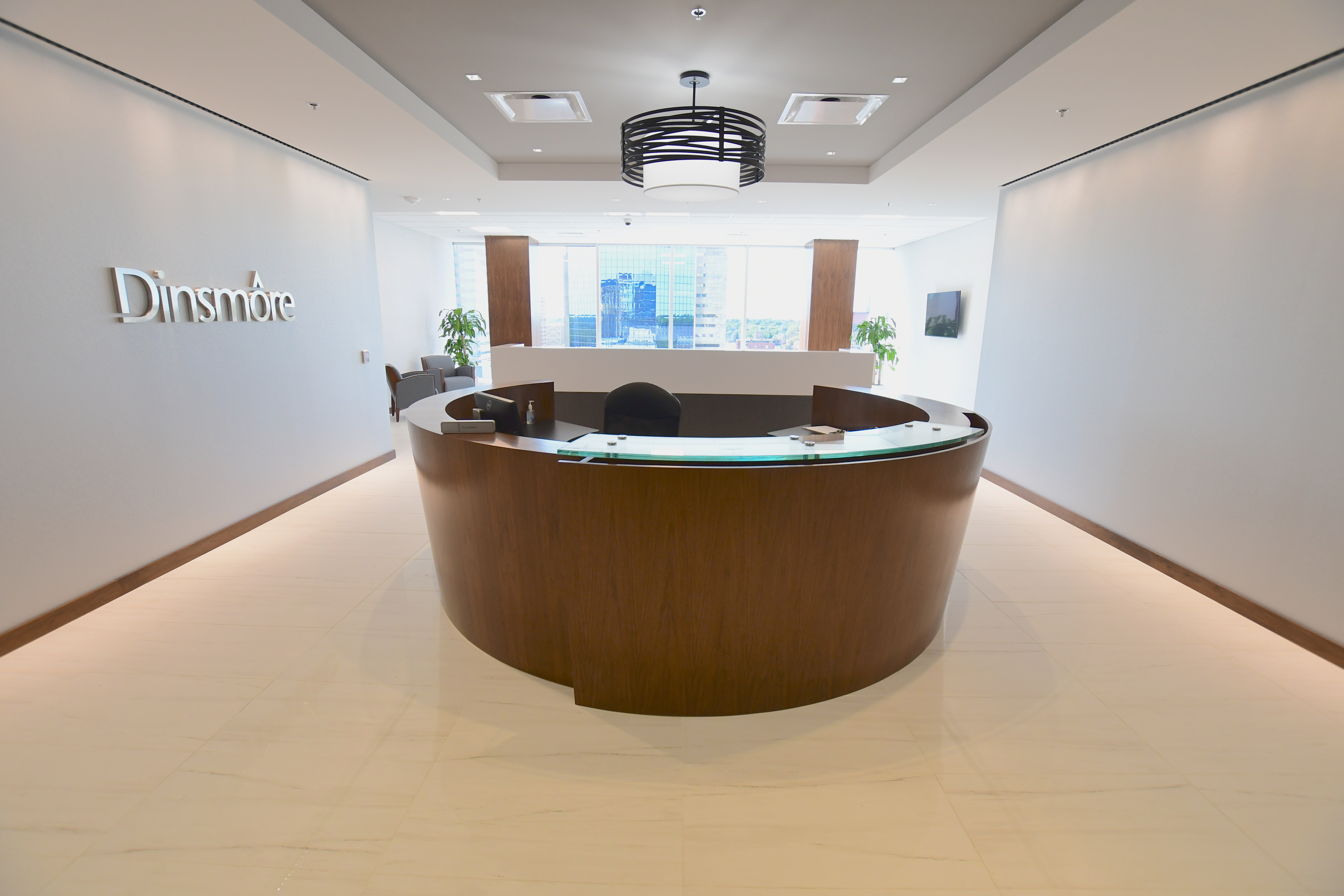
Dinsmore's lobby in City Center

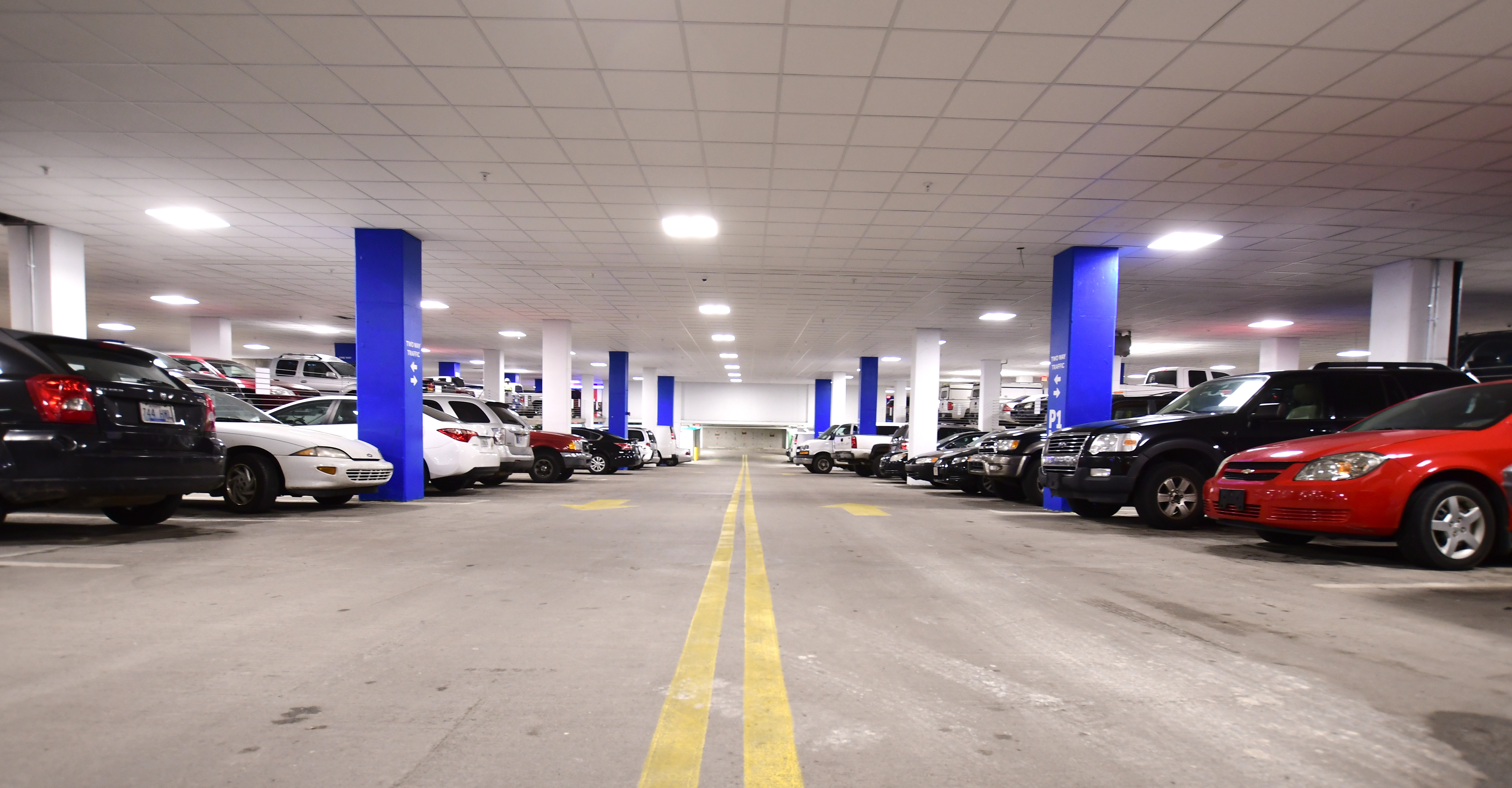
City Center's parking garage

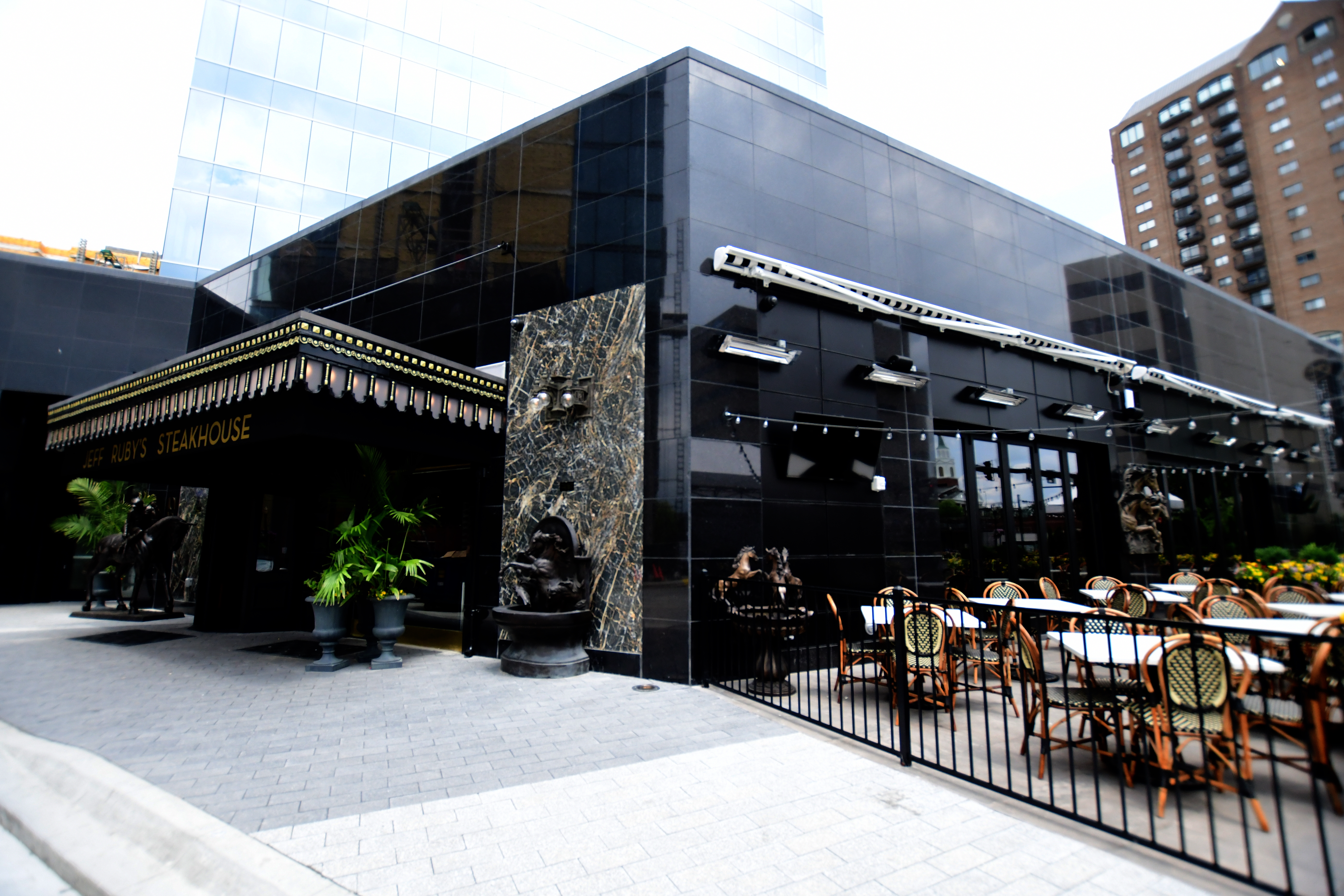
Jeff Ruby's Steakhouse
