= Park Plaza Apartments (Lexington, Kentucky) =

Park Plaza
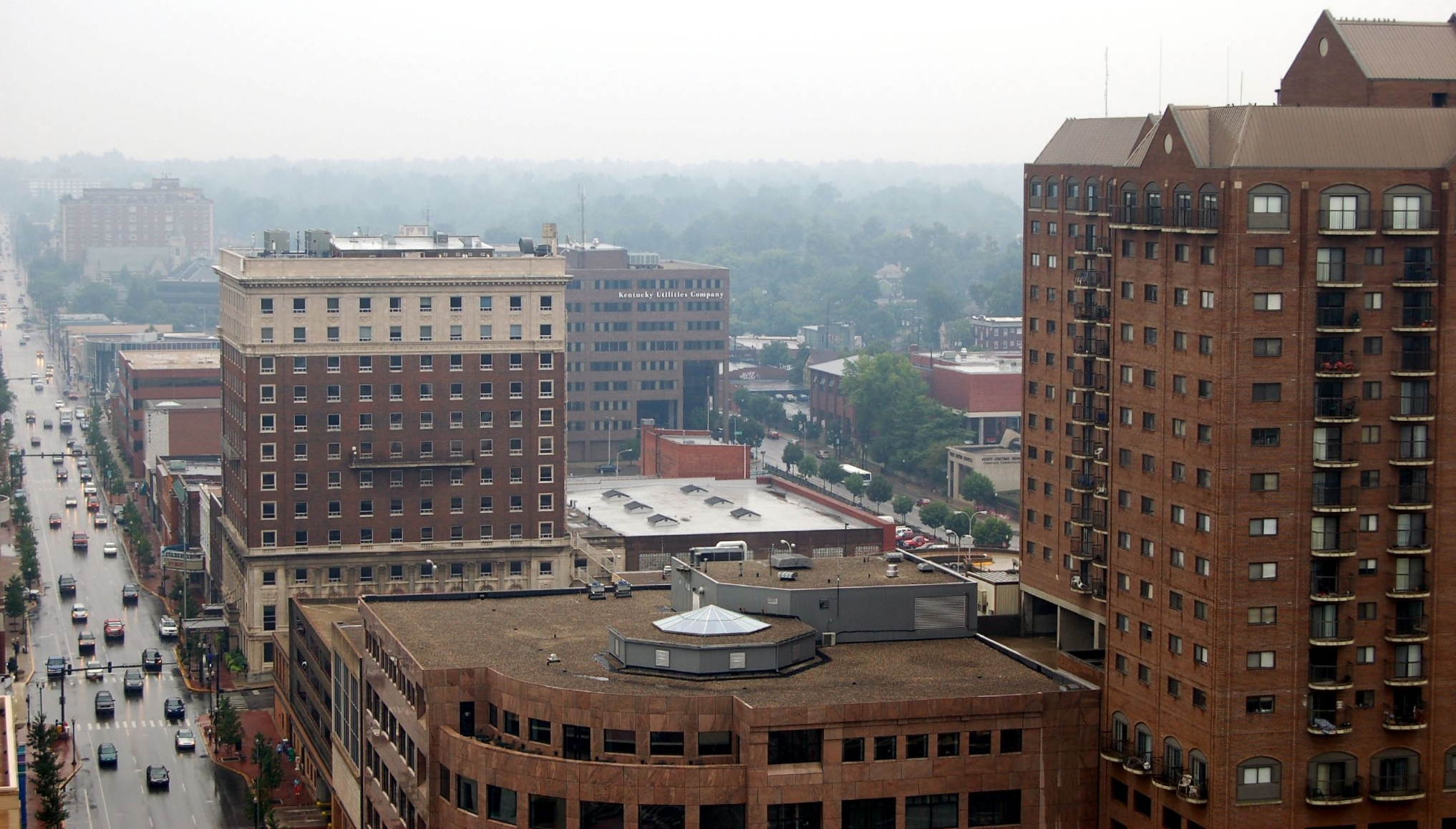
- Park Plaza is at far right
- Interactive map of the Park Plaza area

General information
- Status: Completed
- Type: Residential, retail
- Location: 120 East Main St. Lexington, Kentucky 40507
- Coordinates: 38.0455°N 84.4971°W
- Opening: 1987

Height
- Roof: 213-foot (65 m)

Technical details
- Floor count: 22

Park Plaza Apartments is a 202 unit 21 story residential high-rise in Lexington, Kentucky. It is located between Main and Vine Streets at South Limestone, and is adjacent to Phoenix Park. The complex features a 425-space seven story parking structure, with residential units beginning at the eighth floor. It is connected to the Lexington Public Library.

The apartment structure at 120 East Main features an exercise room on the eighth floor, and the Phoenix Room for private functions on the first floor.

== History ==
Developer Wallace Wilkinson had originally proposed a $123.5 million World Coal Center, but the idea never left the drawing board due to soaring interest rates. Wilkinson revised the project to a far smaller scale. He proposed a $17.3 million, 24 floor apartment building with 250 units, with a 425-space parking structure underneath. Funding was critical to the project. The state had allocated $7.5 million in economic development bonds for the Park Plaza project, which included a Central Park (now Phoenix Park) at Main Street and Limestone, an apartment complex, a state-owned parking structure, and a new public library. The rising costs of materials and various expenses led Wilkinson to request an additional $750,000 in economic development bonds in 1985. After the cost of issuing the bonds was accounted for, at approximately $200,000, and debt service reserve at $750,000, Wilkinson would have $6.6 million available.

On July 9, 1987, 35 people gathered in Central Park for the "topping out" ceremony that marked the placement of Park Plaza's topmost steel beam. Developer Wallace Wilkinson, who later was governor of Kentucky, attended. The uppermost beam contains the name of Wallace Wilkinson and then-Mayor Scotty Baesler. The project was 70 percent completed at that time.

Park Plaza, constructed for $20 million, was completed in the fall of 1987. Models of the apartments were available for viewing on September 1, with the first apartments opening the second week of November. It was the first major rental housing project in downtown Lexington since the early 1970s. It is now owned by Anderson Communities.

== See also ==
- Cityscape of Lexington, Kentucky
