= Vine Center =

Office building in Lexington, Kentucky

Vine City Center
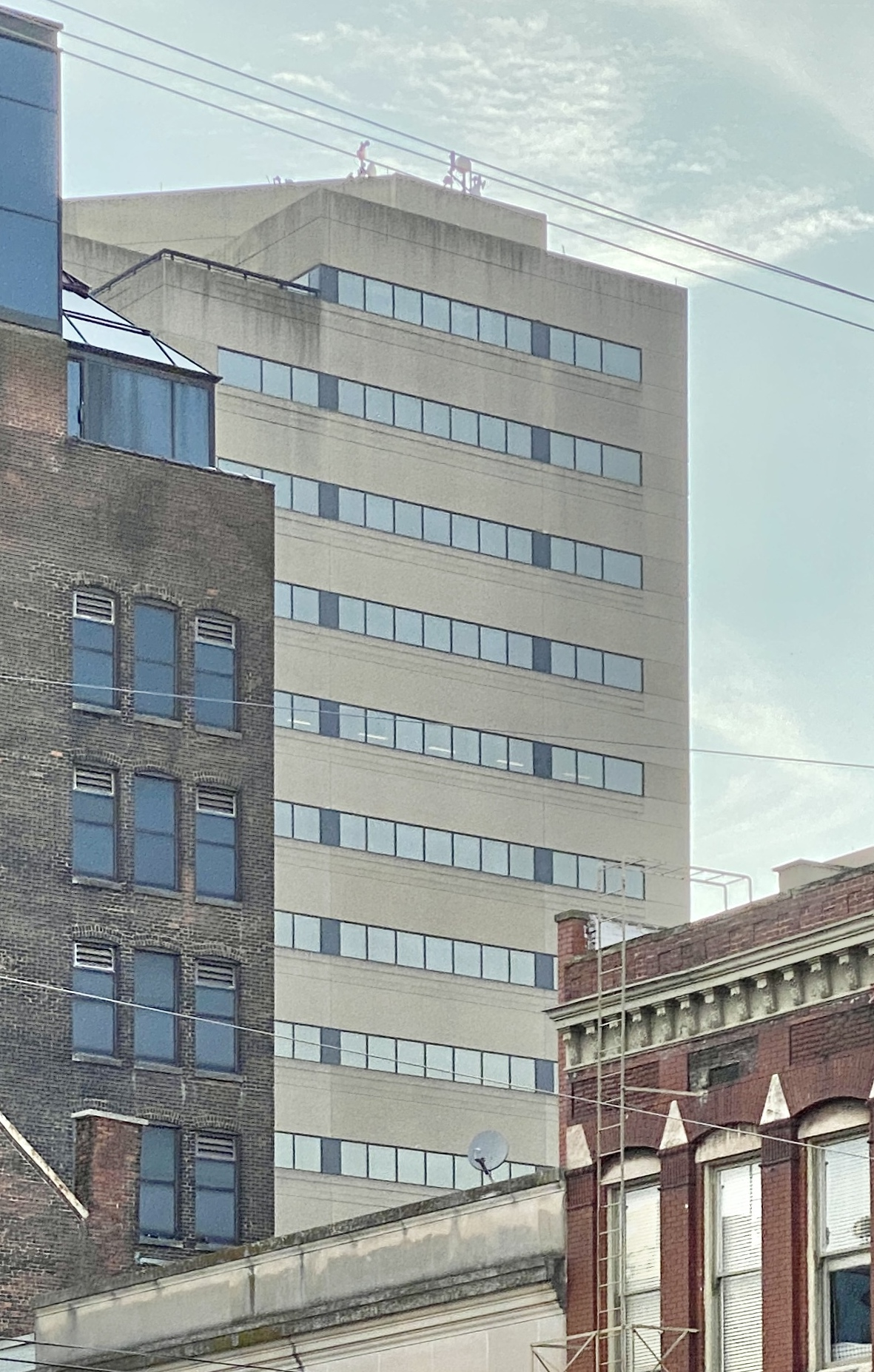
- Alternative names: World Trade Center (Lexington)

General information
- Status: Completed
- Type: Office
- Architectural style: Modernism
- Location: Lexington, Kentucky
- Coordinates: 38.0432°N 84.4930°W
- Completed: 1982

Technical details
- Floor count: 17

Vine Center (previously known as World Trade Center Lexington) is a 17-story high-rise office building located at 301 East Main Street in the city settlement of Lexington, Kentucky. It was completed in 1982 and stands at a height of 233-foot (71 m).

== See also ==
- Cityscape of Lexington, Kentucky
