= Lexington Public Library =

Library system in Lexington, Kentucky

Coordinates: 38°2′43″N 84°29′48″W

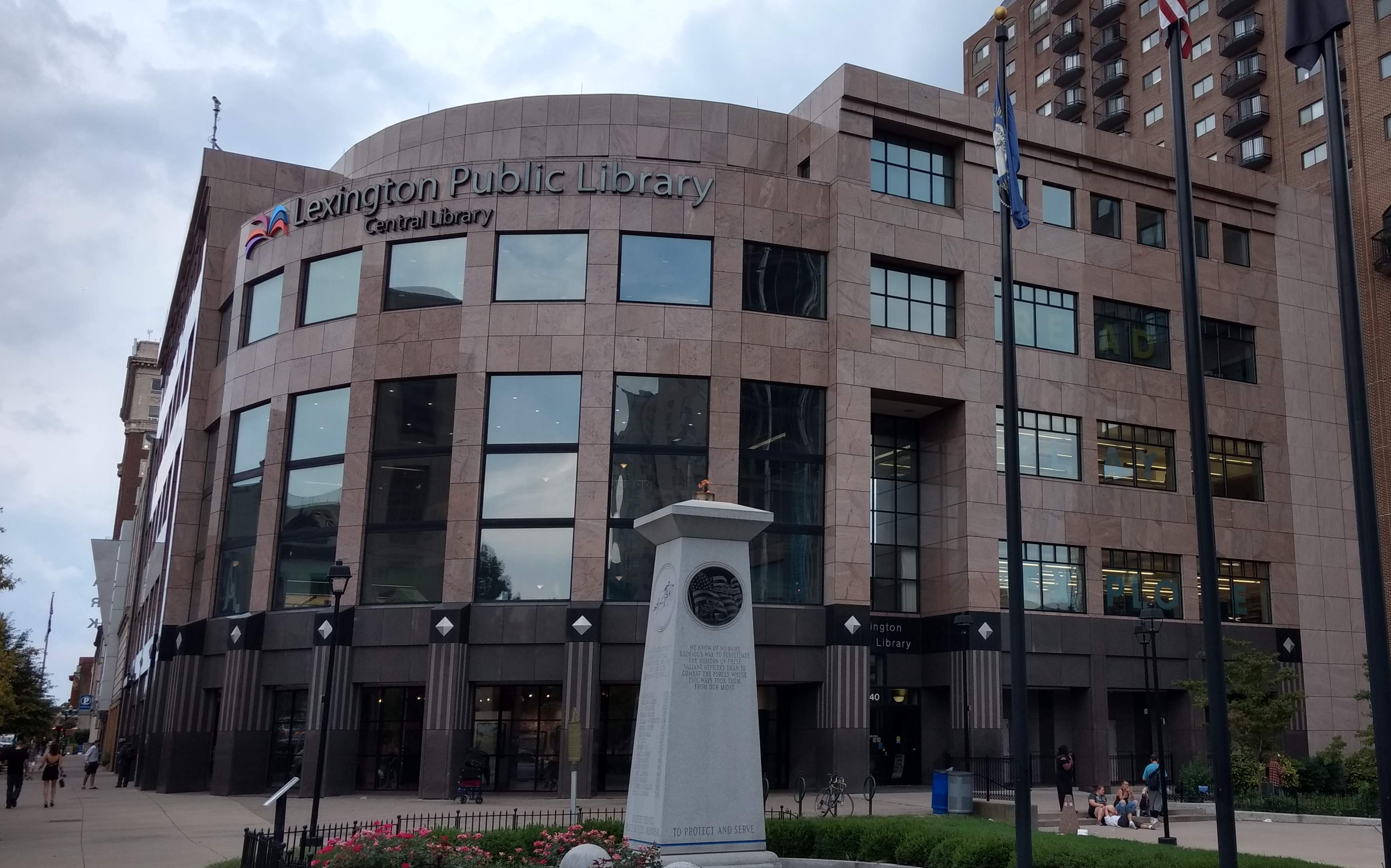
Central Library

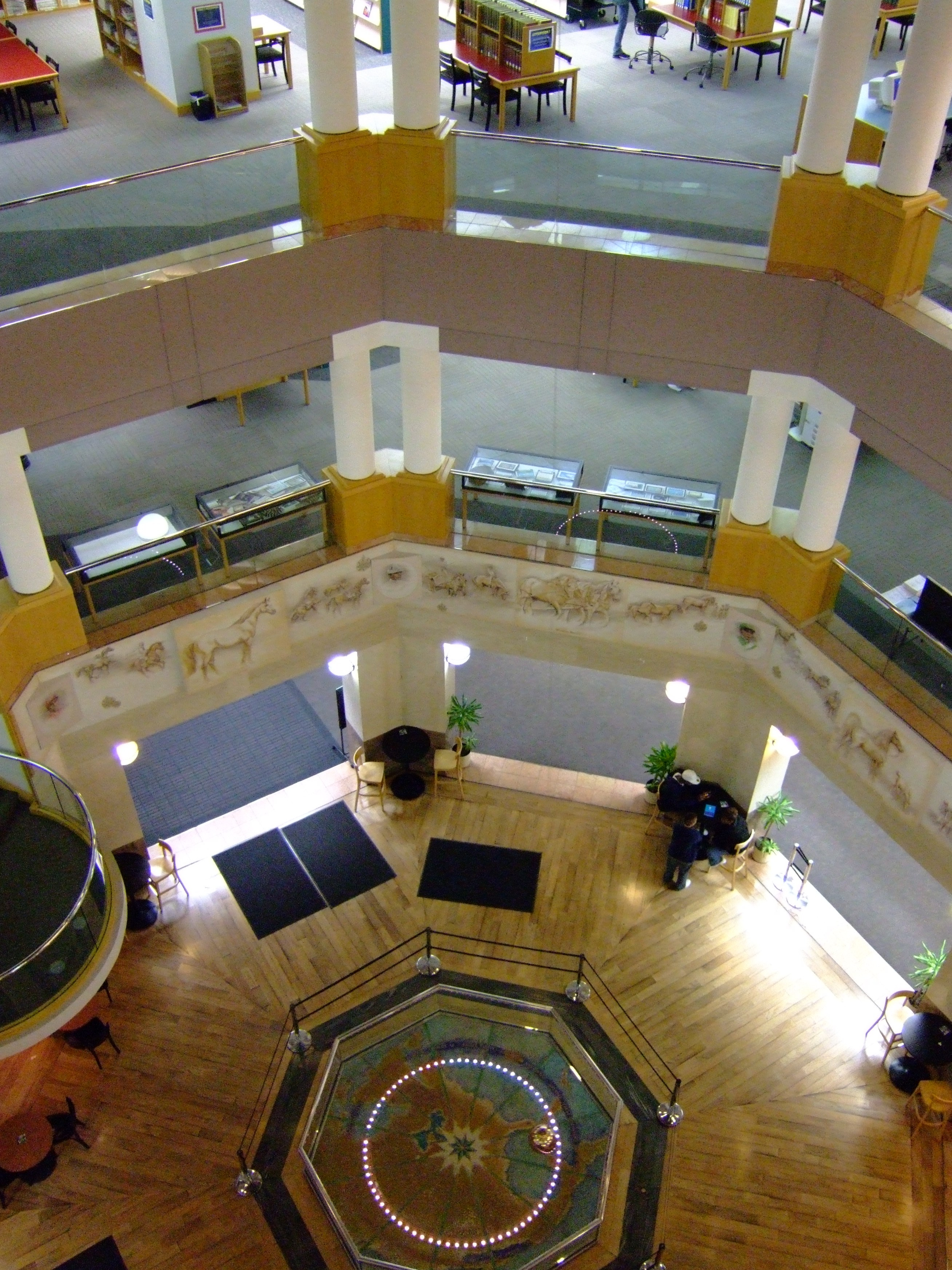
The rotunda at the main library showing the Foucault pendulum, designed by Adalin Wichman

The Lexington Public Library opened in 1905 in Lexington, Kentucky. It incorporated the collection of the former Lexington Library Company (est.1801) and the former Transylvania Library (est.1795). Today the main location of the Lexington Public Library system is Central Library along East Main Street connected to Park Plaza Apartments.

The Library's facade includes rose-colored granite, with large windows facing the street and Phoenix Park. A rotunda in the lobby, the focal point of the building, spans all five floors and houses a Foucault pendulum and frieze designed by Lexington sculptor Adalin Wichman depicting the history of the horse in the Bluegrass. Included within the complex is the 138-seat Farish Theater, meeting rooms and an atrium reading lounge. An art gallery is located on the ground floor.

One of the areas for researchers is the Central Library's Kentucky Room, which houses Kentucky census records and numerous other genealogy and local history resources. It also contains microfilm of the Lexington Herald-Leader, as well as its forerunners, the Lexington Herald and the Lexington Leader, along with other local newspapers.

Central Library is complemented by five branch locations. The Northside Branch, located on Russell Cave Rd., replaced the previous Northside location in 2008. The Tates Creek Branch, located on Walden Drive just off Tates Creek Rd., replaced the Lansdowne Branch in 2001. The Eastside Branch, located on Blake James Dr. at Man o' War Blvd. and Palumbo Dr., replaced the Eagle Creek Branch in 2016. The Beaumont Branch, located on Fieldstone Way just off Harrodsburg Rd., replaced the Southside Branch in 1997. The Marksbury Family Branch, located on Versailles Rd. at Village Dr., replaced the Village Branch in 2024.

== History ==
The original library, opened in 1905, was a Carnegie Library and its building survives today: it is used by the Carnegie Center for Literacy and Learning.

Ground was broken for the new library on June 3, 1987. Then-Mayor Scotty Baesler noted that the new library project was the "most significant building in downtown." During the preliminary renderings of the structure, it was compared to a "warehouse" and a "jail" due to its unappealing facade; this was soon corrected when a granite facade was installed.

Construction began on the new library during the rising of Park Plaza. The cost of the 108,000 sq ft (10,000 m^{2}). facility was $10 million. Enough space was reserved during the planning stages of the library that it withstood expansion for 20 to 30 years. The unfilled space was leased to the University of Kentucky.

== See also ==
- Cityscape of Lexington, Kentucky
