= Rupp Arena =

Indoor arena in Lexington, Kentucky, US

Rupp Arena at Central Bank Center

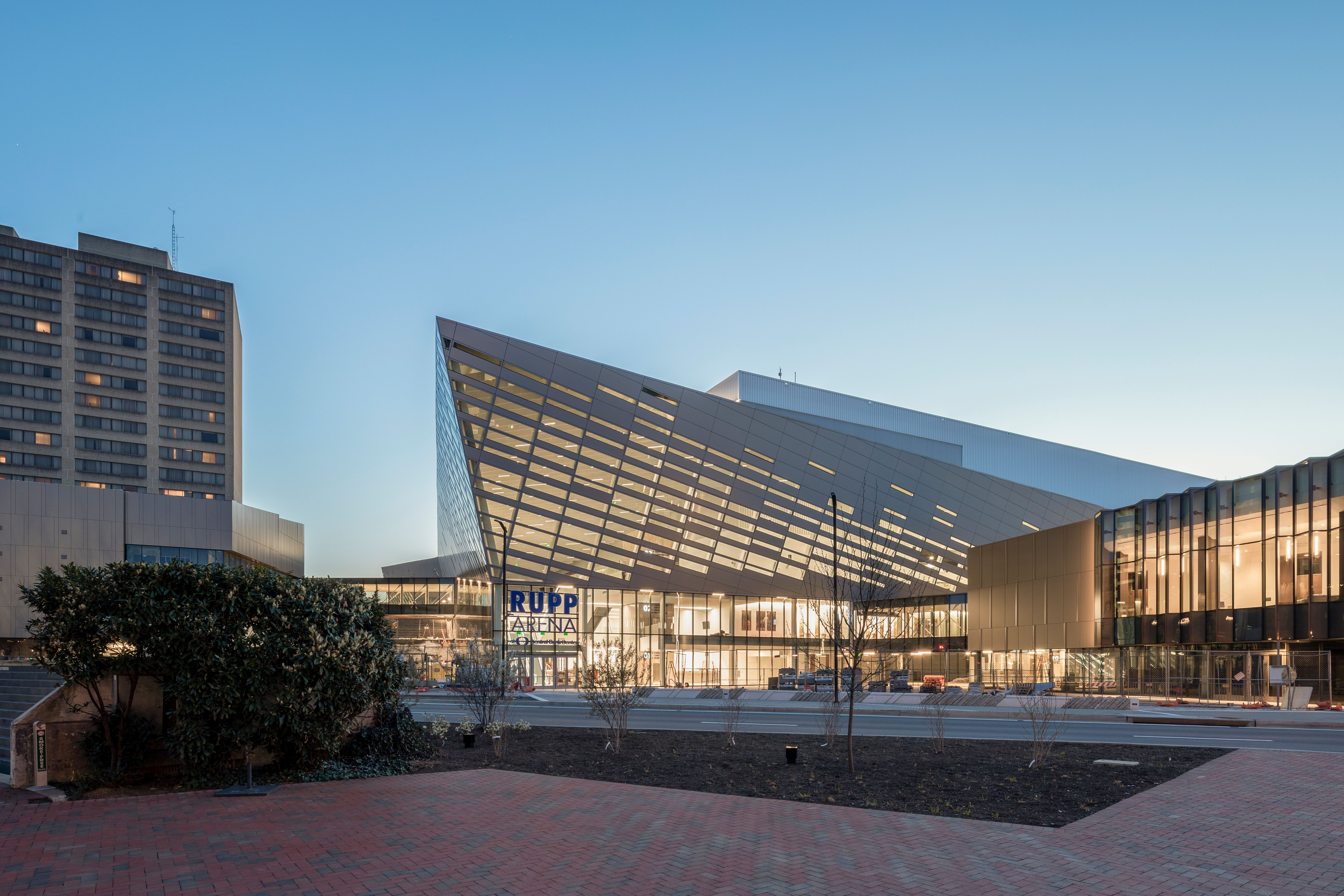
- Interactive map of Rupp Arena at Central Bank Center
- Address: 432 West Vine Street
- Location: Lexington, Kentucky, U.S.
- Coordinates: 38°02′58″N 84°30′10″W
- Owner: Lexington-Fayette Urban County Government
- Operator: Lexington Center Corporation
- Capacity: Basketball: 20,500; Ice hockey: 18,345; Concerts: 23,000
- Surface: Cawood's Court

Construction
- Groundbreaking: June 21, 1974
- Opened: November 27, 1976
- Cost: $55 million ($300 million in 2025 dollars)
- Architect: Ellerbe Becket
- General contractor: Huber, Hunt & Nichols

Tenants
- Kentucky Wildcats (NCAA) (1976–present); Kentucky Thoroughblades (AHL) (1996–2001); Lexington Men O' War (ECHL) (2002–2003); Lexington/Kentucky Horsemen (NIFL/UIF/AF2) (2003–2009)

Website
- centralbankcenter.com/rupp-arena/

Rupp Arena at Central Bank Center is an arena located in downtown Lexington, Kentucky, United States. It is part of Central Bank Center (formerly Lexington Center), a convention and shopping facility owned by an arm of the Lexington-Fayette Urban County Government. It is located next to the Lexington Hyatt and Hilton hotels. Rupp Arena also serves as home court to the University of Kentucky men's basketball program, and is named after former Kentucky coach Adolph Rupp. It has an official capacity of 20,500 and also regularly hosts concerts, conventions and shows.

== History ==
The arena's primary tenant is the Kentucky Wildcats men's basketball team, with the Kentucky Wildcats women's basketball team hosting rivalry and power program opponent games at the venue in recent years. Rupp Arena was the host of the 1985 NCAA Final Four. It also formerly hosted the Kentucky Thoroughblades (currently the San Jose Barracuda) and the Lexington Men O' War minor-league hockey teams, the Lexington Horsemen arena football team, numerous concerts (theater capacity 2,300; concert hall capacity 10,000; arena capacity 20,500), conventions, and other events. The arena opened in 1976, a little more than a year before Rupp's death in late 1977. Since the 1985 Final Four, Rupp Arena has hosted a number of NCAA Tournament regional games, most recently in 2013 when it hosted second and third round NCAA Tournament games. Rupp Arena is also home to Kentucky's high school boys' basketball Sweet Sixteen, a single-elimination tournament which determines the state champion with sixteen teams representing each of Kentucky's regional high school champions.

On January 27, 2020, it was announced that Lexington Center's overall naming rights were sold to Central Bank, a local community bank, by the Lexington Center Corporation and JMI Sports, which handles the multimedia rights for both the LCC and the University of Kentucky. The Rupp name will continue to receive primacy in the fourteen-year agreement for the arena portion of the complex, and be known as "Rupp Arena at Central Bank Center". Floor signage indicating the new naming arrangement was installed on Rupp Arena's basketball floor in time for the 2020–21 season.

== Seating arrangement ==
The arena has an official capacity for basketball of 20,545 following a 2019 renovation project that was part of a larger renovation and expansion of Lexington Center. The most significant change to the arena was the installation of chairback seats in about half of the upper seating bowl.

Before the 2019 renovation, the official capacity was 23,500, but because of the former all-bleacher configuration of the upper seating bowl, it was possible to have more than 24,000 attendees. The lower bowl also incorporates a student standing-room area called the "eRUPPtion Zone" behind one goal. Unlike many arenas built in the following years, it has no luxury suites, and has never been renovated to add them. However, in 2001, the arena received some minor renovations including four oversized video boards, new lower bowl seating, new locker rooms, and a new court.

== Milestones ==
- The first act to perform at Rupp Arena was Lawrence Welk on October 17, 1976. The performance attracted 20,000 people to the newly opened facility.
- Rupp Arena was set to host Elvis Presley live in concert on August 23, 1977. However, Presley died on August 16, exactly one week before the concert was scheduled.
- The ceremonial first basket in the new facility was sunk by Adolph's young grandson Chip (Adolph III), who went on to play college basketball at Southeastern Conference (SEC) rival Vanderbilt.
- Rupp Arena is the home court of the Kentucky Wildcats men's basketball team, which boasts an overall record in Rupp Arena of 529-64 (.892) since beginning play there on November 27, 1976. The court itself is named Cawood's Court after longtime University of Kentucky football and men's basketball radio broadcaster Cawood Ledford.
- Rupp staged three Southeastern Conference men's basketball tournaments between 1982 and 1993; it was also the host of the Ohio Valley Conference men's basketball tournament in 1992 and 1993.
- It hosted WWE Backlash in 2006.
- The Rupp Arena attendance record was set on January 2, 2010, when 24,480 people watched #3 Kentucky play rival Louisville. The final score was a 71–62 victory by the Kentucky Wildcats.

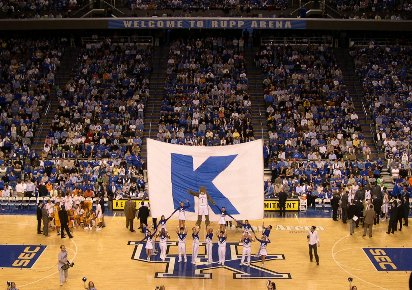
University of Kentucky cheerleaders at Rupp Arena during a basketball game

- The UK men are the only basketball program in the SEC that plays home games in an off-campus facility. All of the other programs play on campus, including the UK women, who play in the men's former home of Memorial Coliseum. However, when the women's program expects an unusually large crowd, it will shift an occasional game to Rupp.
- Rupp is also home to the annual KHSAA State Basketball Championship, known and trademarked as the Sweet Sixteen, with 16 boys' basketball teams from throughout the commonwealth appearing for a shot at the state title. The KHSAA girls' Sweet Sixteen will join the boys' event at Rupp in 2019.
- The University of Kentucky has led the nation 25 times in NCAA men's basketball home attendance (an NCAA record) since the 1976–77 season (the previous 39 seasons at Rupp Arena), including 17 out of the last 20 seasons, and eight of the last 10 seasons.
- On December 21, 2009, in Rupp Arena, the Kentucky men's basketball team became the first college basketball program to win 2,000 games, in an 88–44 win against the Drexel University Dragons.
- On November 8, 2010, ESPN ranked Rupp Arena as the third-loudest venue in college basketball.
- Rupp Arena hosted the August 2, 2011, tapings of SmackDown and WWE Superstars, with the former set to air on August 5, 2011, and the latter having aired on August 4, 2011.
- The arena hosted several TV tapings for various WWF shows in the 1980s and 1990s.
- The 500th win in Rupp Arena came on November 27, 2013, against Eastern Michigan, with Kentucky winning 81–63.
- Before the 2019 renovation, it was Kentucky's largest arena, and has hosted concerts by many performers, including Paul McCartney, Genesis, Elton John, The Rolling Stones, The Grateful Dead, Rush, George Strait, Billy Joel, Guns N' Roses, Tim McGraw, Phish, Garth Brooks, CKY, Bob Seger, Trans-Siberian Orchestra, and in recent years, Pearl Jam, Taylor Swift, Drake, Brad Paisley, Morgan Wallen, Miranda Lambert, and Fall Out Boy.
- On January 28, 2017, with #4 Kentucky hosting #2 Kansas at Rupp Arena, the Guinness Book of World Records measured the loudest indoor crowd roar at 126.4 dB. It lasted 17 days before Guinness recorded a roar of 130.4 dB at Allen Fieldhouse when West Virginia played at Kansas.
- The majority of the home games during the 2023-2024 Kentucky women's basketball season, as well as all home gymnastics and volleyball matches in 2023–2024, were moved to Rupp Arena. This was due to ongoing renovations to Memorial Coliseum.

== 2015 renovations ==
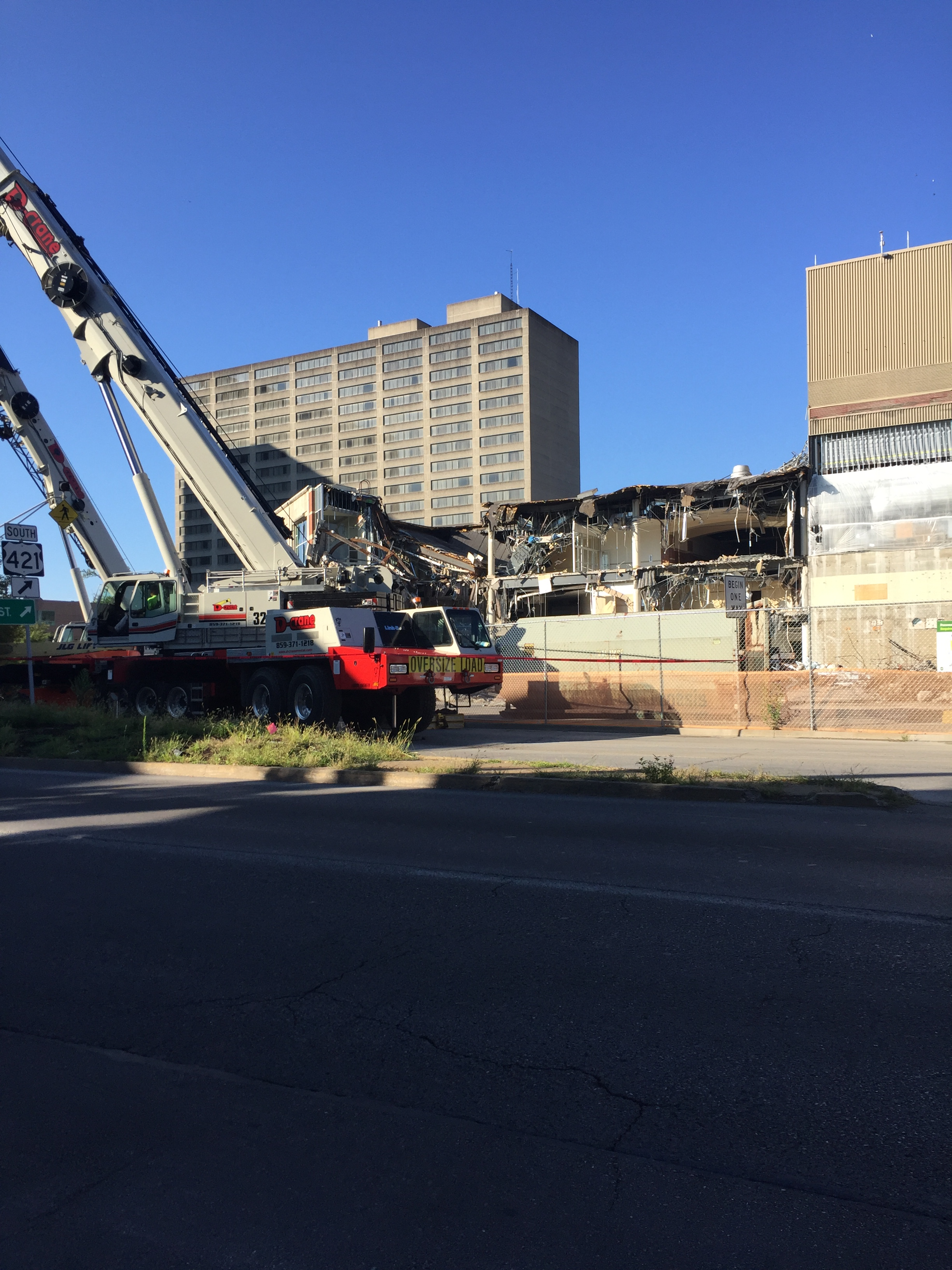
Outside the arena during 2020 renovations

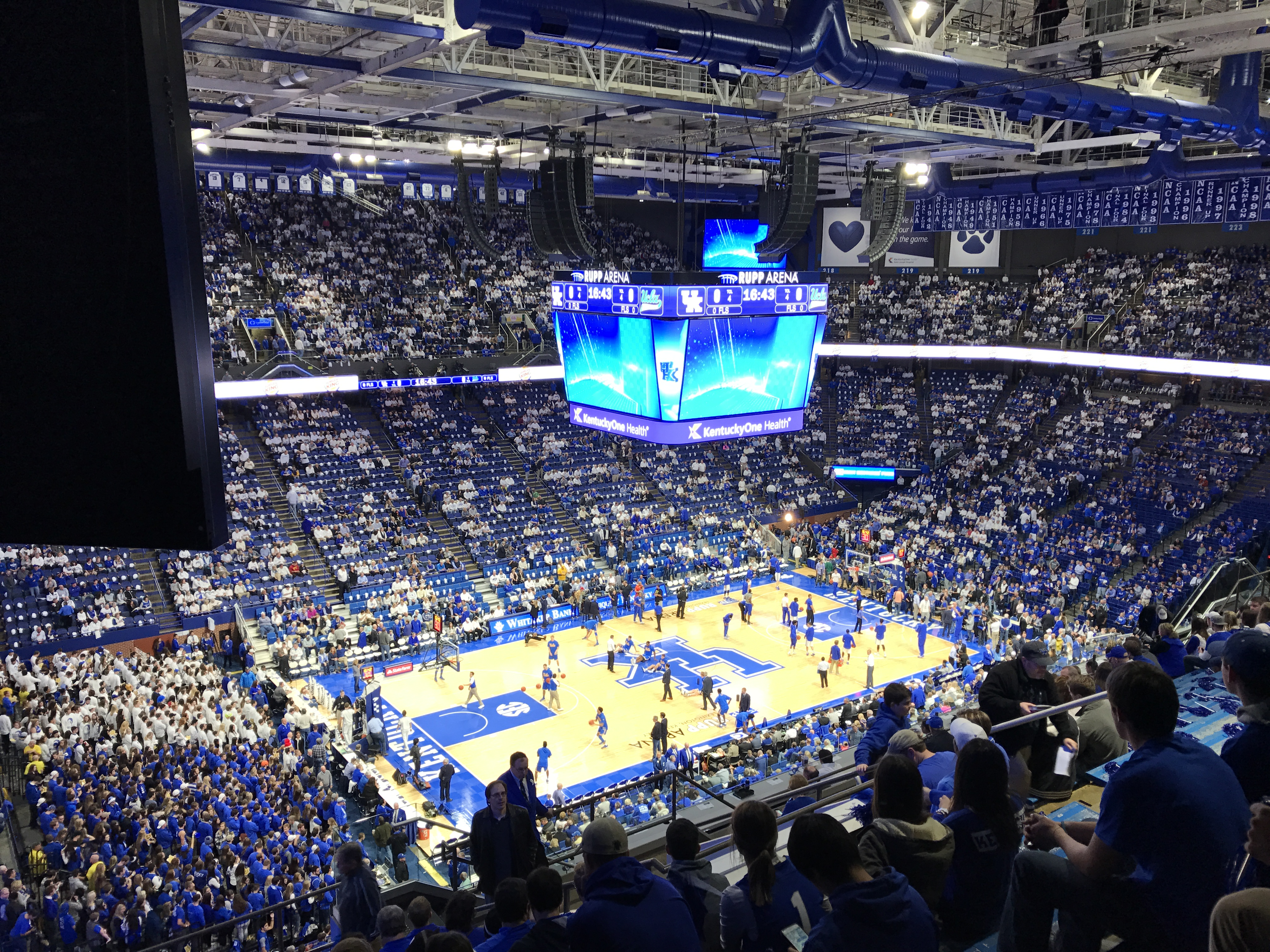
New scoreboard becomes the centerpiece of Rupp Arena

Rupp Arena was approved for various renovations in 2015 to improve fan experience and to attract more concerts and major events. The approved renovations totaled at $15.8 million that included a new center-hung scoreboard, advertising ribbon boards, wireless internet for fans, and improved roof infrastructure.

The entire list of renovations as stated on UK Athletics' website include:

- State-of-the-art Daktronics center-hung video board
- 15mm ribbon boards
- Replaced 16mm LED corner video boards with 6mm LED video boards to produce HD quality image
- L-Acoustics K2 line array sound system
- Total sanding and repainting of the floor to reflect UK's updated branding and logo
- New basketball goals and new shot clocks
- Added press box seating to the east side of the arena
- Replaced LED scorer's table with 6mm version and moved the old 10mm scorer's table to the opposite side of the floor for radio broadcast seating
- Replaced static advertisement panels in lower four corners of the arena with LED advertisement panels

== NCAA Tournament games ==
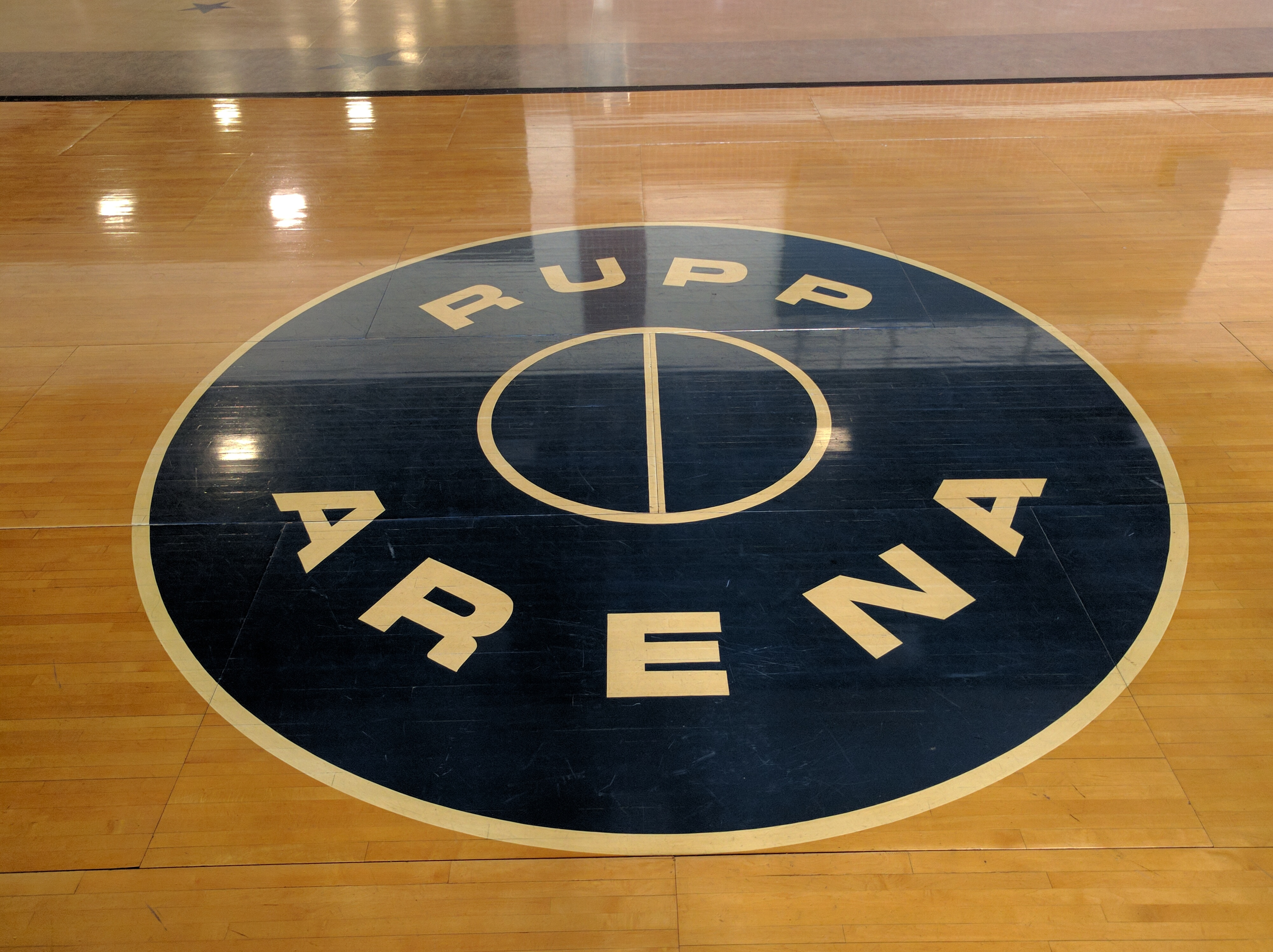
The old center court welcomes fans in the main lobby of Rupp Arena

- 2025 First and Second Rounds
- 2013 Second and Third Rounds
- 2007 First and Second Rounds
- 2002 South Regional Semi-finals and Final
- 1998 First and Second Rounds
- 1996 Southeast Regional Semi-finals and Final
- 1994 First and Second Rounds
- 1992 Southeast Regional Semi-finals and Final
- 1989 Southeast Regional Semi-finals and Final
- 1985 NCAA Final Four
- 1984 Mideast Regional Semi-finals and Final
- 1980 Mideast Regional Semi-finals and Final
- 1977 Mideast Regional Semi-finals and Final

== Attendance record progression ==
The Kentucky Wildcats have set or broken the Rupp Arena attendance record 24 times since the arena opened in 1976. In those games, the Wildcats have won 20 times and lost 4 times.

Attendance	Date	Kentucky opponent	Result
23,266	November 27, 1976	Wisconsin	Won 72–64
23,271	January 12, 1977	Tennessee	Lost 71–67 (OT)
23,392	February 14, 1977	Florida	Won 104–78
23,412	February 26, 1977	Alabama	Won 85–70
23,472	November 26, 1977	SMU	Won 110–86
23,521	December 5, 1977	Indiana	Won 78–64
23,608	March 4, 1978	UNLV	Won 92–70
23,798	December 15, 1979	Indiana	Won 69–58
23,809	December 3, 1980	Ohio State	Won 70–64
23,875	December 13, 1980	Kansas	Won 87–73
24,011	March 1, 1981	LSU	Won 73–71
24,165	December 8, 1981	Indiana	Won 85–69
24,185	February 27, 1983	Tennessee	Won 69–61
24,203	December 7, 1985	Indiana	Won 63–58
24,288	January 14, 1989	LSU	Lost 64–62
24,301	February 15, 1990	LSU	Won 100–95
24,310	March 2, 1991	Auburn	Won 114–93
24,324	January 25, 1992	Arkansas	Lost 105–88
24,332	March 7, 1992	Tennessee	Won 99–88
24,340	December 23, 1995	Louisville	Won 89–66
24,459	February 4, 2003	Florida	Won 70–55
24,465	February 10, 2007	Florida	Lost 64–61
24,474	December 5, 2009	North Carolina	Won 68–66
24,480	January 2, 2010	Louisville	Won 71–62

== See also ==
- List of NCAA Division I basketball arenas
- List of indoor arenas by capacity
