= The Dame =

Coordinates: 38°2′49″N 84°29′53″W

The Dame's logo

The Dame was a music hall in downtown Lexington, Kentucky, United States. The venue hosted live music seven nights a week from local, regional, and national headlining acts. Nick Sprouse and Cole Skinner served as talent buyers.

The Dame traditionally booked indie rock, punk, alternative country, underground hip-hop, rockabilly, jazz, bluegrass, jam bands, folk, experimental, and reggae. The Dame also hosted film screenings, open mic nights, charity events, and participated in city events such as the annual Mardi Gras celebration.

The Dame opened in April 2003. It had a capacity of 390. The room was a traditional music hall with general admission standing room. The Dame was forced to close after the property owners demolished the entire city block to build a multi-use office building and hotel. A second location opened in October 2008 a few blocks down the street but closed in September 2009. Both buildings have since been demolished.
