= Hilton Lexington/Downtown =

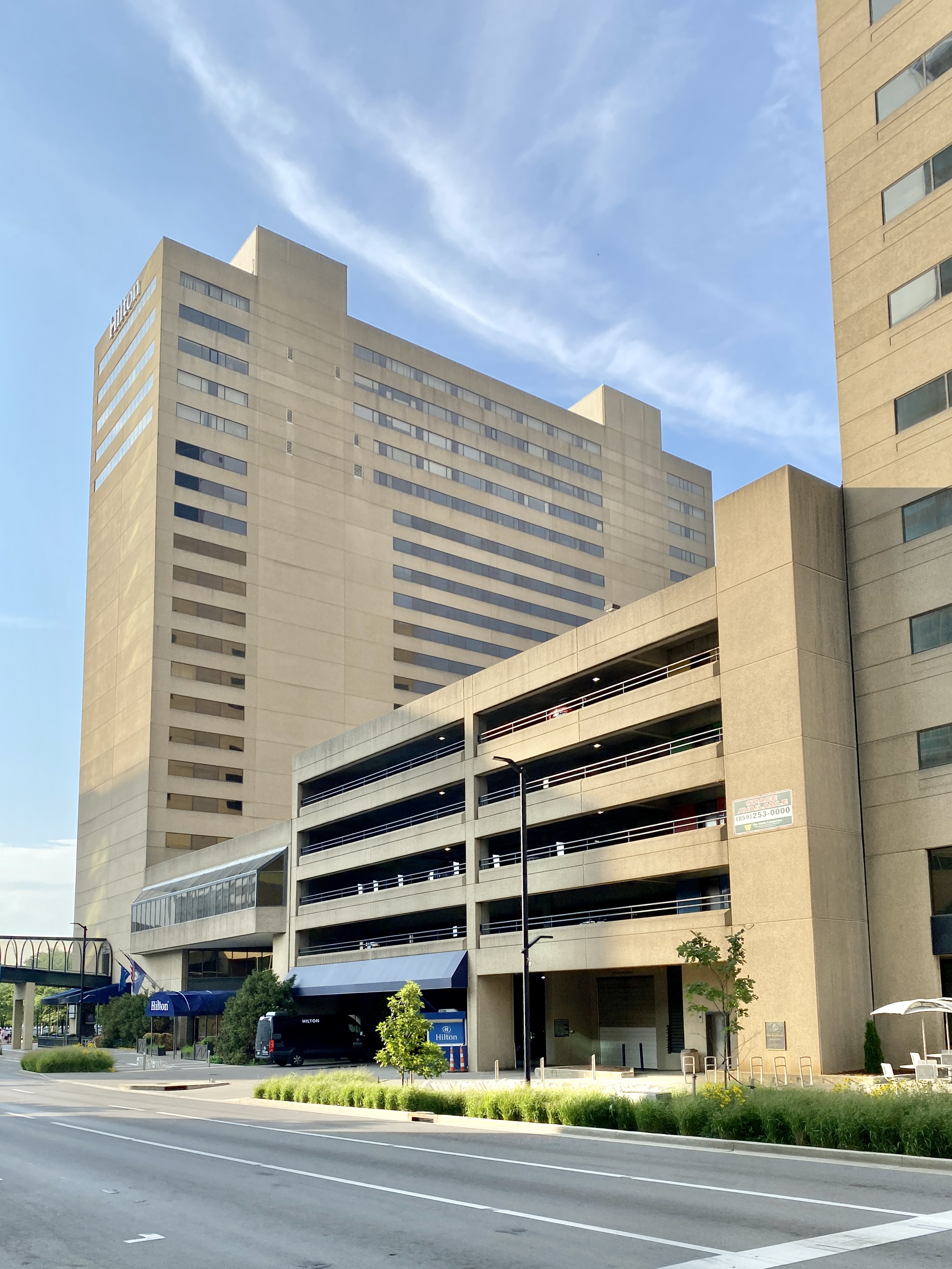
- Interactive map of the Hilton Lexington/Downtown area

General information
- Type: Hotel
- Location: 369 West Vine St. Lexington, Kentucky
- Coordinates: 38.0485°N 84.5001°W
- Completed: 1978

Height
- Roof: 240 ft (73 m)

Technical details
- Floor count: 22
- Floor area: 250,000 sq ft (23,226 m^{2})

Design and construction
- Architect: The Webb Companies

Website
- lexingtondowntownhotel.com

The Hilton Lexington/Downtown is a 240 feet (73 m), 22-story multi-use skyscraper in Downtown Lexington, Kentucky. Floors 1 through 17 comprise the 366-room hotel, while floors 18 through 22 are privately owned condominiums.

== History ==
The hotel constructed by the Webb Companies beginning in 1978 and was completed in 1982 as the Radisson Plaza Hotel Lexington. The hotel left Radisson in August 2008 and briefly operated as the Lexington Downtown Hotel & Conference Center during renovations until October 14, 2009, when it was renamed Hilton Lexington/Downtown.
