= List of presidents of the University of Kentucky =

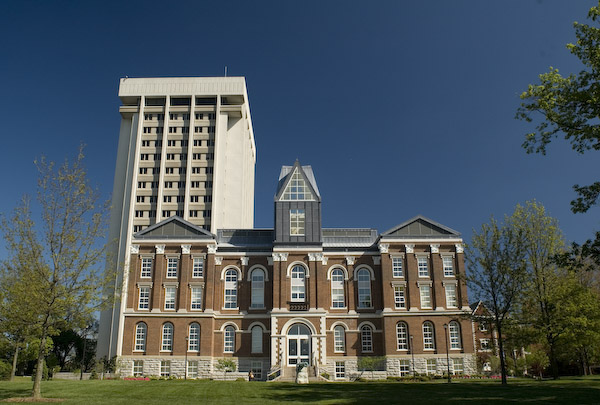
The Main Building in the foreground and the Patterson Office Tower in the background.

The University of Kentucky is a public research university in Lexington, Kentucky. It was founded by John Bryan Bowman in 1865 as the Agricultural and Mechanical College of Kentucky (A&M), a publicly charted department of Kentucky University (now called Transylvania University), under the Morrill Land-Grant Colleges Act. James Kennedy Patterson, a professor at Kentucky University, became the first president of A&M in 1869. Nine years later, amid concerns about a private religious university receiving public land-grant funding, A&M split from Kentucky University and moved to its present campus in downtown Lexington. The institution was renamed State University, Lexington, Kentucky, upon reaching university status in 1908, and eight years later, was again renamed the University of Kentucky. Today, the university is the state's largest and its flagship.

The office of the president is housed in the Main Building. Finished in 1882, the Main Building was one of the original three State College buildings. Patterson personally financed the construction of all three. Maxwell Place, an Italianate villa located off Rose Street in the heart of campus, serves as the residence of the president. It was originally constructed for James Hillary Mulligan and his wife Mary in 1872, and was acquired by the university in 1917 after Mulligan's death. Frank L. McVey was the first president to reside at Maxwell Place.

The president is the chief executive officer of the university. The president is appointed by the Board of Trustee and can only be removed "for incompetence, neglect of or refusal to perform duties, or for immoral conduct," and then only after notice and hearing. The president is the chair of the University Senate and an ex officio member of the Staff Senate. While the Board has delegated most administrative power to the President, it retains the right to approve certain major decisions, including the annual budget and establishing academic councils. In the event of a vacancy, the provost serves as president until the Board appoints an interim or new president.

Twelve men have served as president of the University of Kentucky. Of those, five were graduates of the university or its predecessor institutions, and another attended without graduating. A. D. Kirwan served only in an interim capacity, but was retroactively named the seventh president by the Board of Trustees. The twelfth and current president, Eli Capilouto, assumed the office in 2011.

== Presidents ==
The following persons have served as president of the University of Kentucky:

No.	Image	Name	Term begin	Term end	Ref.
Presiding officers of the Agricultural and Mechanical College of Kentucky University (1866–1869)
1		John Augustus Williams	October 1866	January 1868	
2		Joseph DeSha Pickett	1868	1869	
Presidents of the Agricultural and Mechanical College of Kentucky (1869–1908)
1		James Kennedy Patterson	1869	1910	
Presidents of the State University, Lexington, Kentucky (1908–1915)
2		Henry Stites Barker (Note: Attended A&M (1869–1872; did not graduate))	1911	1917	
Presidents of the State University of Kentucky (1915–1922)
3		Frank L. McVey	1917	1940	
Presidents of the University of Kentucky (1922–present)
4		Herman Lee Donovan (Note: Graduate of State University (BA 1914))	1941	1956	
5		Frank G. Dickey (Note: Graduate of the University of Kentucky (MA 1942, EdD 1947))	1956	1963	
6		John W. Oswald	1963	August 9, 1968	
interim 7		A. D. Kirwan (Note: Graduate of the University of Kentucky (BA 1926). Only served as interim, but retroactively named the seventh President by the Board of Trustees)	August 10, 1968	August 17, 1969	
8		Otis A. Singletary	August 18, 1969	June 30, 1987	
9		David Roselle	July 1, 1987	December 28, 1989	
10		Charles T. Wethington Jr. (Note: Graduate of the University of Kentucky (MA 1962, PhD 1966).)	December 28, 1989	June 30, 2001	
11		Lee T. Todd Jr. (Note: Graduate of the University of Kentucky (BS 1968))	July 1, 2001	June 30, 2011	
12		Eli Capilouto	July 1, 2011	present	

Table notes:
