= Traditions at the University of Kentucky =

The University of Kentucky is a public university located in Lexington, Kentucky. It was founded in 1865, and is the largest and oldest public school in the Commonwealth of Kentucky. Athletically, the University of Kentucky competes at the Division I level of the NCAA, and is a founding member of their primary athletic conference, the Southeastern Conference.

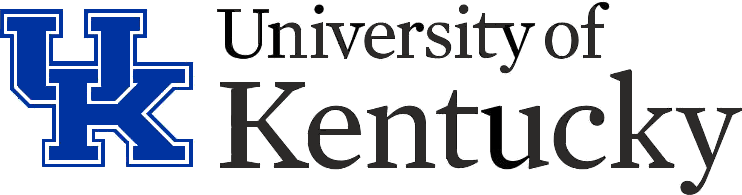
University of Kentucky Logo

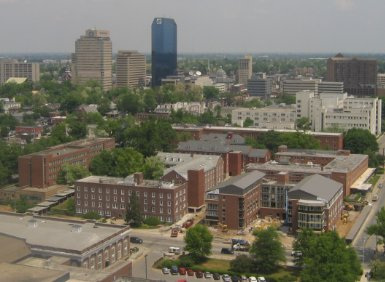
North Campus of the University of Kentucky

Throughout their 150+ years of existence, the University of Kentucky has developed numerous traditions and legends shared among the student body and its alumni. Due to their prominence in various collegiate sports, many of the traditions at the university are focused on their athletic program. Additionally, due to the university's success in college basketball, the Kentucky Wildcats men's basketball team has existed as a symbol of greater American basketball culture.

Some of the most well known traditions are the playing of "My Old Kentucky Home" after each sporting event, the "C-A-T-S" spell out and Big Blue Madness.

== Names and branding ==
=== Mascot: Wildcats ===
According to the University of Kentucky's "traditions page," the Wildcats nickname came from a 1902 Football game where Kentucky beat Illinois 6–2. "Commandant Carbusier, then head of the military department at Kentucky told a group of students in a chapel service following the game that the Kentucky football team had "fought like Wildcats." Later the name Wildcats became more and more popular among UK followers as well as with members of the media. As a result, the nickname was adopted by the university."

=== Physical mascots ===
The University of Kentucky has two plush mascots: "The Wildcat" and "Scratch". The Wildcat mascot originated during the 1976 football season. Throughout the early 1980s, the university introduced another plush mascot walking on stilts. This was to honor Kentucky's Basketball team which had Sam Bowie (7'1") and Melvin Turpin (6'11"). These two were known as "The Twin Towers," thus the university needed another mascot. This mascot would eventually come to be known as "Scratch", and remains the mascot for the Kentucky women's teams and youth programs.

Along with The Wildcat and Scratch, Kentucky has routinely kept a live bobcat as a mascot. The first Wildcat would attend games at Commonwealth Stadium (now Kroger Field), however there is disagreement as to whether the first Bobcat was named "Fuzzy" or "Tom". After the first bobcat, the university would introduce "TNT" and "Whiskers", however neither enjoyed being kept in captivity. For this reason, their attendance of football games was suspended. In the 1940s, the university introduced "The Kentucky Colonel," who was human-friendly and affectionate, and returned to the football sidelines. After The Kentucky Colonel, the university introduced "Baby", though she did not enjoy captivity. After Baby, the university decided to maintain a live mascot but would not allow them to attend football games. As of 2025, the University of Kentucky has "Blue", a live bobcat kept at the Salato Wildlife Education Center near Frankfort, KY.

The university has two bobcat statues, both named "Bowman". One is located in the Gatton Student Center and the other is located on the Wildcat Alumni Plaza across the street from Historic Memorial Coliseum.

=== Blue and white color scheme ===
According to the university, the original colors of the university were blue and yellow. These colors were decided during a student vote prior to the 1891 Kentucky-Centre College Football Game. As for the shade of blue, the University Traditions webpage quotes: "The shade of blue, which is close to a royal blue, was chosen when a student asked the question, "What color blue?" At the time, Richard C. Stoll (who lettered in football at UK in 1889–94) pulled off his necktie and held it up. The students then adopted that particular shade of blue."

== Traditional music ==
=== On, On U of K ===
The Fight Song of the University of Kentucky is "On, On U of K." The melody was written in 1922 by Dr. Carl Lampert, a music professor and the first UK music department chair, while the lyrics were written the following year by Troy Perkins, a student. The song was first published in The 1925 Kentuckian, the University of Kentucky yearbook. The lyrics are:

“On, on U of K. We are right for the fight today!

Hold that ball and hit that line. Every Wildcat star will shine.

The lyrics include the line ‘We’ll fight, fight, fight for the Blue and White, as we roll to that goal, varsity.

And we’ll kick, pass and run ‘til the battle is won, and we’ll bring home the victory”

=== Kentucky Fight! ===
Kentucky, Fight! is utilized as a secondary fight song. The origin of the song is not publicly known, and the lyrics are never used.

The lyrics are:

Normal Verse:

"Kentucky! We will beat the foe!

Kentucky! Onward we’ll go

Kentucky! We will hail to thee

And victorious we will be today

Rah! Rah! Rah!"

Basketball verse:

"Kentucky! Dribble down the floor!

Kentucky! Fight for ev’ry score!

And you’ll win for the blue and white

So yea! You wildcats!

Fight! Fight! Fight!"

Football verse:

"Kentucky! Hit that line real hard!

Kentucky! Fight for ev’ry yard!

And you’ll win for the blue and white!

So yea! You wildcats!

Fight! Fight! Fight!"

=== Kentucky Alma Mater ===
The Alma Mater of Kentucky is the aptly named "Kentucky Alma Mater". The song is very rarely used, and never used in athletics. The lyrics are:

"Hail Kentucky, Alma Mater!

Loyal sons and daughters sing;

Sound her praise with voice united;

To the breeze her colors fling.

To the blue and white be true;

Badge triumphant age on age;

Blue, the sky that o'er us bends;

White, Kentucky's stainless page."

=== My Old Kentucky Home ===
The State Song of the Commonwealth of Kentucky is "My Old Kentucky Home". The song is utilized in athletics as an homage to the people of Kentucky, being played before and after most athletics events. During the song, Kentucky fans are expected to wrap their arms around each other and sway to the music. In the chorus of the song, fans are expected to raise one finger into the sky. When the lyrics: "We will sing one song for my Old Kentucky Home" are sung, fans pump the finger up and down. During the final lyrics: "...and my Old Kentucky Home, far away," fans turn their finger into a wave to the rest of the fans. The (modern) lyrics are:

Verse 1

The sun shines bright in My Old Kentucky home,

‘Tis summer, and people are gay;

The corn-top’s ripe and the meadow’s in the bloom

While the birds make music all the day.

The young folks roll on the little cabin floor

All merry, all happy and bright;

By ‘n’ by hard times comes a knocking at the door

Chorus

Then My Old Kentucky Home, good night!

Weep no more my lady

Oh! weep no more today!

We will sing one song

For My Old Kentucky Home

For My Old Kentucky Home, far away.

== Athletic traditions ==
=== The Big Blue Nation (BBN) ===
Kentucky fans refer to themselves as being a part of "The Big Blue Nation". In the sport of college basketball, Kentucky fans are often seen as some of the most passionate. Their aggression has been seen as both a positive and a negative amongst the rest of college basketball. Numerous sports media organizations have ranked Kentucky fans as being "the best", however many people cite the aggression of Kentucky fans as being the reason that some coaches quit coaching at the university.

=== "Go Big Blue" chant ===
During sporting events, Kentucky fans will synchronize a chant saying "Go Big Blue". Kentucky fans have garnered a reputation for traveling to away games (and starting the Go Big Blue chant in opposing team's stadiums).

=== "The Greatest Tradition in the History of College Basketball" ===
The University of Kentucky has a deep history and tradition with its Men's Basketball team. As of February 2025, the Kentucky Wildcats Men's Basketball team has: 2398 Wins (Most all time), 8 National Championships (2nd all time), 17 Final Four appearances (2nd all time), 110 NBA Draft Picks (Most all time), 57 All Americans (Most all time), 33 Conference Championships (Most all time), and the university has led in the NCAA in attendance 25 times (Most all time). For these reasons, the University of Kentucky claims to be "The Greatest Tradition in the History of College Basketball," a slogan they use in promotional material and in the arena.

=== Not storming the court ===
In college athletics, it has become a tradition to rush/storm the playing service during upsets. Since Kentucky has such a deep history in basketball, the fan base has mutually agreed to never storm the court during big wins. The idea behind this is that Kentucky is so historic, no game can be considered an upset. As of February 2025, Kentucky fans have never stormed the court in men's basketball.

=== Blue-White Chant and Blue-White Game ===
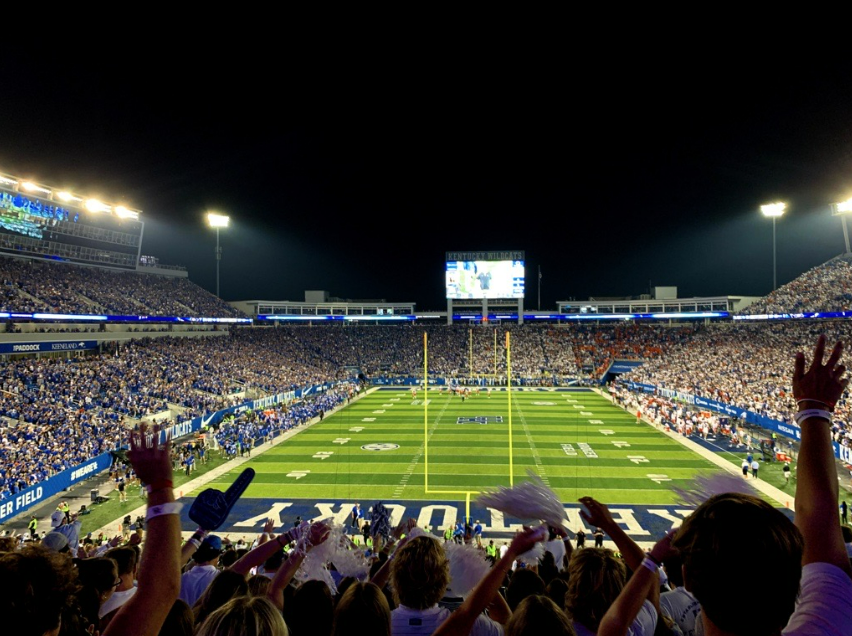
Kentucky Fans splitting the crowd during the Annual Blue-White Game

During Kentucky Football Games (and recently, Basketball Games), Kentucky Fans will be orchestrated by the stadium videoboard to chant either "blue" or "white" (depending on where they are seated in the stadium). To compliment this, once a year, Kentucky fans will pick a game where they split the crowd into groups wearing blue and groups wearing white. This was first done during the 2021 meeting of the Kentucky-Florida rivalry where the crowd of 61,632 fans disrupted Florida's offense into committing 8 "false start" penalties. Throughout the game, the "Blue-White Chant" could be heard overpowering the game audio on TV broadcasts.

=== The C-A-T-S spell out and "Wildcat Push-Ups" ===
During sporting events, the Kentucky cheerleaders will lead the fans in the C-A-T-S spell out. In football, the spell out is done by "The Wildcat." After each time the football team scores, the cheerleaders will lift the mascot on a board for him to do push-ups. The Wildcat will do one push-up for each point the team has, his final one will be a one-armed pushup, and the crowd is expected to call-out the number of push-up as they're done. After the push-ups are completed, the mascot will rally the crowd to say:

"ooooooooohhhhh... C-A-T-S CATS! CATS! CATS!"

In Men's and Women's Basketball, the Cheerleaders lead the C-A-T-S spell out by diving onto the court and contorting their bodies onto the court to mimic the letters they are spelling out.

=== The "Y" ===
During each men's basketball game, the cheerleaders will spell out the letters to Kentucky with their bodies. For each letter, one cheerleader will exit the formation to hold up a card with the letter on it until there are only 2 cheerleaders left to spell the 2nd "K." Then, a Kentucky basketball celebrity will come out and hold up their arms spelling the "Y."

=== K-Flag pyramid ===
Near the ending of each men's and women's basketball game, the cheerleaders will form a pyramid with a mascot at the top (The Wildcat for men's games and Scratch for women's games). Behind the pyramid, a large flag with the letter "K" (or modernly, just the UK logo) will be displayed by two cheerleaders. Then, the band will play a version of "On, On U of K" and "Also Sprach Zarathustra" while the pyramid rotates to face each portion of the arena.

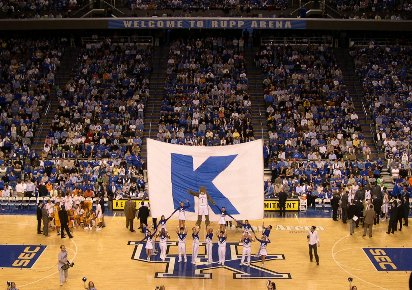
K-Flag at Rupp Arena

=== Big Blue Madness ===
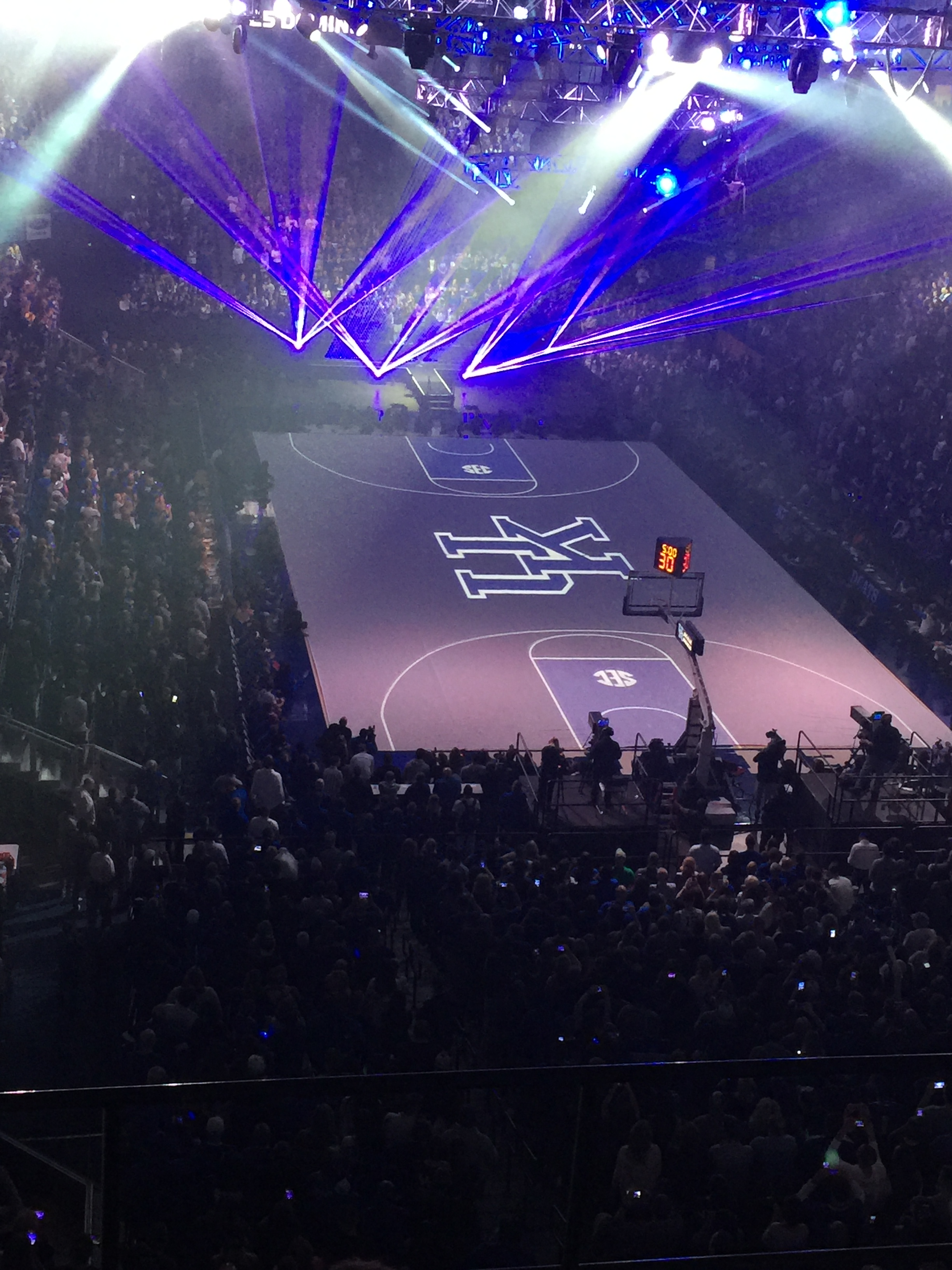
Big Blue Madness in 2015

The University of Kentucky claims to have popularized the tradition of Midnight Madness with their version: Big Blue Madness. The tradition is where teams hold an inner-team scrimmage to display the talents of the team for the upcoming season (along with other performances). Kentucky claims to be the first school to host the event regularly, and in modern times, the first school to broadcast it live on ESPN. Originally, the game was held at midnight on the very first day that the NCAA would allow teams to practice. In modern times, due to changes in NCAA policy, Big Blue Madness has been moved to an earlier time in the day. The University of Kentucky held the record for attendance at "Midnight Madnesses" with an attendance of 23,312 at Rupp Arena. Notable moments from Big Blue Madness include Drake performing in 2014 and "The John Wall Dance" in 2009. In 2024, the University of Kentucky debuted the first-ever college basketball court made of an ASB-Glass Floor.

=== The eRUPPtion Zone ===
The standing-room-only student section at Kentucky basketball games is known as "The eRUPPtion Zone." The name, a play on words between the word "Eruption" and former Kentucky basketball coach "Adolf Rupp", references the rowdiness of the students. During games, the eRUPPtion zone is referred to as the "6th Man for the Wildcats," referencing the influence they have on games by distracting opposing teams. Before each game, the eRUPPtion zone hoists a banner that says "KENTUCKY" or "Kentucky Basketball Never Stops" during the stadium pregame festivities. Additionally, when the opposing team is announced by the public address announcer, the eRUPPtion zone chants "sucks" when each player's name is called. When the coach's name is called, they chant "he sucks too!".

=== Hand signals – free throws and threes ===
During Men's Basketball Games, Kentucky fans will show three types of hand signals. During Kentucky free throws, fans will raise one finger to the sky, and will motion it downwards (to mimic a ball going into the hoop) if the shot goes in. When a Kentucky player shoots a three-pointer, fans will raise their hands with the "OK" symbol into the sky and chant "Three!"

=== "Who's in the House Tonight?" ===
Prior to the 1996 National Championship Game, the Kentucky men's basketball team was recorded chanting: "Who's in the House Tonight?... UK!". In 2024, when the University of Kentucky hired former 1996 National Champion, Mark Pope, which re-popularized this chant. At Kentucky basketball games, the public address announcer will ask the crowd: "Who's in the House Tonight?" to which the fans will reply: "UK!"

=== "L's Down" ===
The University of Louisville has a tradition where fans make a letter "L" with the thumb, index and middle finger while saying "L's Up." As a jab towards their rival, Kentucky fans will turn the "L" upside down and say "L's Down."

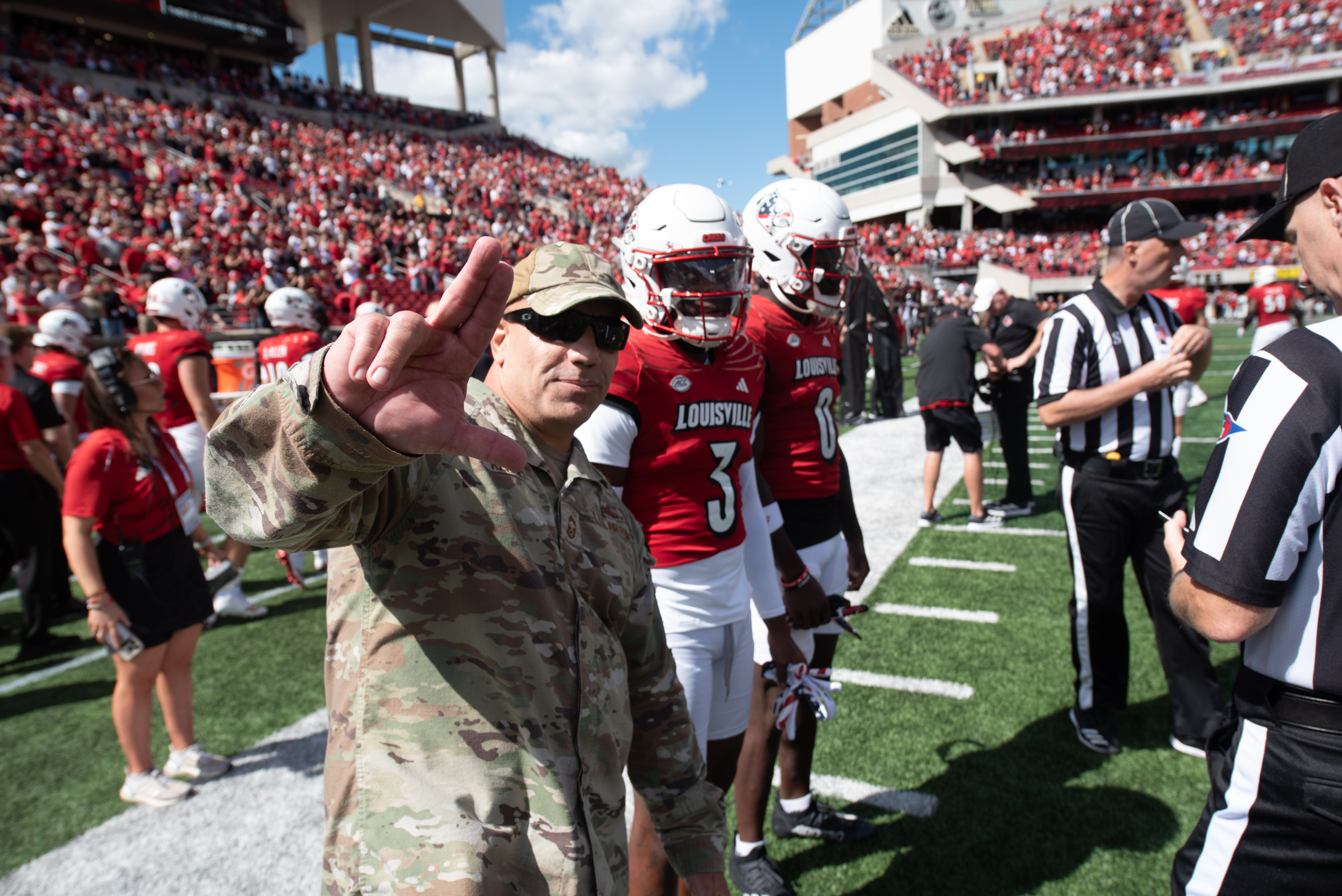
Example of "L's Up"

=== First Down Kentucky ===
After each "First Down" the Kentucky Football teams earns, the public address announcer, Carl Nathe, will say: "And the gain is good, for a FIRST DOWN KENTUCKY." The fans will repeat this line with him, and will motion their arms in the direction of the first down. In the student section, the students will whip rally-towels (which are given out to each student) to the cadence of the first down call.

=== Coal Whistle ===
Additional to the "First Down Kentucky" call, Kentucky will play a coal whistle after each first down. This is in homage to the Commonwealth of Kentucky's tradition of coal mining.

=== Call to the Post ===
Prior to most Kentucky athletics competitions, a member of the University of Kentucky band will play the bugle "Call To The Post". The tradition originates from City of Lexington's horse racing tradition, being home to the Keeneland Race Course and Auction House and with the city claiming the title of "The Horse Capital of the World." In practice, the bugle is utilized to conduct jockeys to take their horses to their place in the starting gate. Thus, the university's usage of the bugle instructs the players to do the same.

=== John Wall Dance ===
During Big Blue Madness in 2009, Kentucky Guard John Wall made his first appearance for the team. During his announcement, he came out dancing, in what would be known as "The John Wall Dance.' The dance seeing a person flex their bicep while twisting their wrist back and forward. This dance is still done today at Kentucky basketball games by students. After the dance's viral popularity, music group Troop 41 released a single called "Do the John Wall," eventually peaking at number 76 on the Billboard Hot 100.

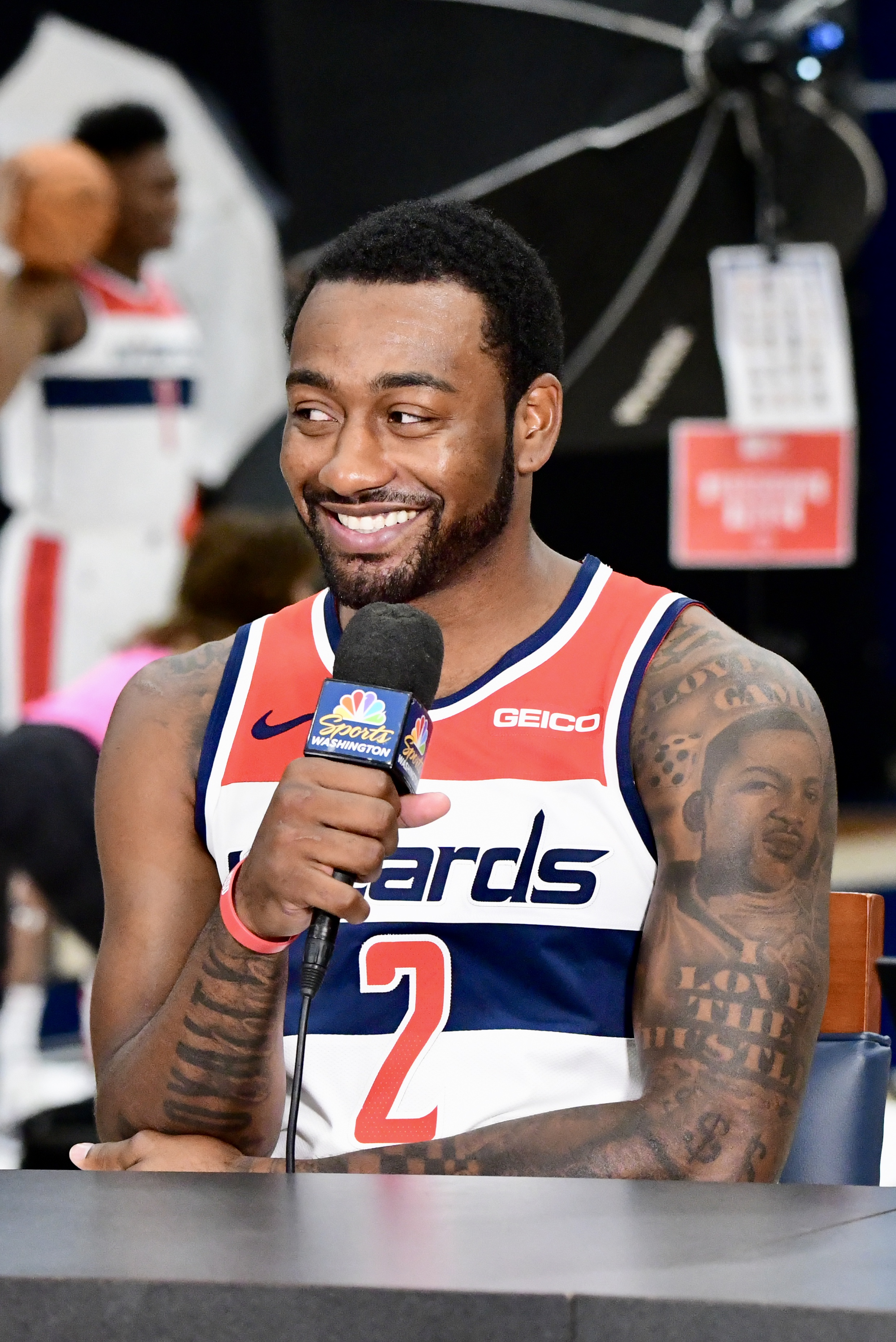
John Wall, creator of the John Wall Dance

=== Team nicknames ===
For Kentucky basketball teams that have particularly dominant or special seasons, the fanbase will "name" the team. By naming the team, the individual season is considered enshrined permanently in history. Some notable teams with names are listed below.

- The Fab Five: The 1947–48 National Championship-winning team that was led by the 5-best players in College Basketball: Ralph Beard (guard), Alex Groza (center), Wallace "Wah Wah" Jones (forward), Cliff Barker (forward), and Kenny Rollins (guard). After their collegiate career, the Fab Five would start on Team USA's 1948 gold medal-winning Olympic basketball team.
- The Fiddlin' Five: The 1957–58 National-Championship-winning team earned the name for, as Coach Adolph Rupp put it, "Fiddlin' Around." The team would usually play poorly, go down big deficits, then come back to win the game. In the National Championship game against Seattle, they were down by 11 points on two separate occasions yet won the game.
- Rupp's Runts: The 1965–66 team earned the name for being abnormally short. No player was taller than 6'5", yet, they made the National Championship. The team would end up losing to Texas Western (now UTEP) in the Championship game. That game is the subject for the movie "Glory Road."
- The Team Without Celebration: The 1977–78 National Championship-winning team earned the name for dealing with intense "all-or-nothing" pressure from Kentucky Basketball fans. Coach Joe B. Hall remarked that the pressure was intense, and that "This season was without celebration for us.
- The Unforgettables: The 1991–92 team earned the name for being led by a starting lineup of mostly Kentucky Natives. The team would be defeated in the Elite Eight by Duke during a game that was referred to as "The Shot."
- The Untouchables: The 1995–96 National Championship-winning team earned the name for having 9-players on the roster that would later play in the NBA. The team was dominant, winning 34 games and the 1996 National Championship.
- The Comeback Cats: The 1997–98 National Championship-winning team earned the name for overcoming large deficits in multiple key games, eventually leading them to a victory in the 1998 National Championship game.
- The Tweakables: The 2013–14 team earned the name after Coach John Calipari indicated that the team performed better after he "tweaked" it. Despite being asked multiple times by the media, nobody on the team would indicate what this "tweak" was. The team became famous after Guard Aaron Harrison hit 3-Straight Game Winning shots in the NCAA Tournament, leading the team to the National Championship game against UConn (which they would lose).
- The Pursuit of Perfection: The 2014–15 team earned the name after becoming the first team in NCAA History to go undefeated in the regular season (since the expansion to the 30+ Regular Season game model). The team would win the SEC Tournament, and would enter the Final Four 38–0. The team would later lose to the Wisconsin Badgers in the Final Four. Due to poor officiating in the game (of which the NCAA would formally apologize for), many Kentucky fans accused the referees of cheating. One referee, John Higgins, would receive the brunt of this treatment. He was doxxed, swatted, and received numerous death threats. During the 2016 NCAA Tournament, Higgins would referee a game between Kentucky and North Carolina that too was believed to be rigged against Kentucky. After their loss, Kentucky fans and media would again barrage Higgins, resulting in his roofing company filing a defamation and harassment lawsuit against Kentucky media company "Kentucky Sports Radio."

=== "Blue Blood" status ===
Due to Kentucky basketball's historic dominance, the team is included in college basketball's list of Blue Bloods. Some of the most historic programs, coincidentally, all share the color blue: Duke, Kansas, Kentucky, UCLA, UNC. This title is often used in discourse when discussing the dominance of particular teams. The term has also found its way into other sports, losing the "blue-specific" meaning in the title. Additionally, other programs (Indiana Men's and Tennessee Women's Basketball) are considered Blue Bloods despite being red and orange respectively.

== Popular music traditions ==
=== Kernkraft 400 by Zombie Nation | "We are UK" Chant ===
Prior to most Kentucky Athletics competitions, the song "Kernkraft 400" is played. During the chorus of the song, Kentucky fans will chant "We are UK." However, this song has been utilized in numerous other fandoms, most famously, Penn State Football with the "We are Penn State" chant and UCF Football with their "Bounce House" moniker.

=== Grove St. Party by Waka Flocka Flame ===
As the Kentucky football team enters the field before games, "Grove St. Party" is played. The tradition started during the 2014 meeting between the Kentucky Wildcats and the South Carolina Gamecocks, where the Kentucky Wildcats overcame a 14-point deficit to upset South Carolina. The game was won after Kentucky legend, Bud Dupree, intercepted Dylan Thompson's pass, returning it for a game winning touchdown. After the game ended, the fans stormed the field. During the game, Kentucky's players could be seen dancing to the song prior to kickoff, in a moment which many have referred to as the "Birth of Modern Kentucky Football." To honor the moment, Kentucky has played the song every game since then. In 2021, Waka Flocka Flame attended the Kentucky/Florida football game, leading the team out the tunnel singing the song with the crowd.

=== Water Verve (D.J. Quicksilver Remix) by Mark Van Dale and Enrico ===
Before Kentucky Men's Basketball games, the song "Water Verve" is played. The song is played during the "Traditions" video, which is a video playing homage to the history of Kentucky Basketball. During the song, the "eRUPPtion Zone" will raise their banner and the fans will clap with the beat of the song.

=== Mony Mony by Billy Idol ===
Popularized during the 1990s, the song "Mony Mony" is played at Kentucky Basketball games. During the lyrics: "Here she comes now sayin' Mony Mony" Kentucky fans will chant "Hey! Go Cats!". This chant goes on through each line of the first verse.

=== What’s Your Favorite Color? by Living Colour ===
During Kentucky Basketball Games, the first line of the song "What's Your Favorite Color?" is played. The first line, "What's your favorite color baby?" is a call in response, where fans respond with "Blue and White!"

=== Vampire by Tribal Seeds ===
In recent years, it has become a tradition where someone on the Kentucky Baseball team is given walk-up song "Vampire." When the song is played, the crowd at Kentucky Baseball games will raise their arms up and down, mimicking a "bowing down" motion. The tradition was started by Kentucky Outfielder Adam Fogel, and was later passed down to Outfielder Ryan Waldschmidt. For the 2025 season, the player who has this walk-up song is Infielder Patrick Herrera.

=== Scholarships by Drake & Future ===
During the mid-2010s, music artist Drake and Kentucky Basketball Coach John Calipari had a close relationship. This led to Drake and Future releasing the song "Scholarships", where drake references "And I Rock Kentucky Blue." This is further in reference to Drake's various appearances at the university, including at Big Blue Madness. To honor him, this song is still placed at Kentucky Sporting events, however less after the 2024 escalation of the Drake–Kendrick Lamar feud.

=== You'll Never Leave Harlan Alive by Patty Loveless ===
The song "You'll Never Leave Harlan Alive" has been used as a cultural song for the entire region of Appalachia. In the mid-2020s, the song was introduced to the start of Kentucky Football Games as a reference to the university's connection to the region.

== Legends and important games ==
The following is a list of notable games and legendary moments involving the University of Kentucky Athletics.

=== June 15, 2024: (#2) Kentucky 5 – 4 (#10) NC State | College World Series ===
In 2024, the Kentucky Wildcats Baseball Team made the College World Series for the first time. In their first match, they were slated to play the NC State Wolfpack. Throughout the game, Kentucky led 3–1, until they surrendered 2 runs in the 7th inning. In the 9th inning, NC State's Garrett Pennington scored on a Kentucky wild pitch, giving the Wolfpack a 4–3 lead in the 9th. Kentucky's Ryan Nicholson would level the score with a Home Run to left field in the bottom of the 9th. In the 10th inning, Kentucky's Mitchell Daly would win the game on another Home Run to shallow left field. Kentucky would later fall to Texas A&M and Florida, leaving this game as the team's only ever World Series win.

=== November 26, 2016: Kentucky 41 – 38 (#11) Louisville | "The Thrill in the 'Ville" ===
In 2016, Kentucky's main rival Louisville was seeking to make the College Football Playoffs. Led by soon-to-be Heisman winning Lamar Jackson, Louisville had been dominant all season. Kentucky, at the time, was 6–5 and having a mediocre season. The Wildcats were 1–7 in the Southeastern Conference and had 3.1% chance of winning the game (according to ESPN win probability). The game was close throughout, with no team leading by more than 10 points at any given time. In the waning minutes of the game, Louisville had possession in Field Goal range. With 2:20 to go in the game, Lamar Jackson would run a Quarterback keeper where he fumbled to ball to Kentucky's Courtney Love. Then, on the shoulders of JoJo Kemp and Stephen Johnson, Kentucky would push the ball down the field, giving Austin MacGinnis the opportunity to kick a go-ahead Field Goal from 47 yards out. He'd hit the field goal, giving the Wildcats the lead with :12 remaining in the game. Louisville had enough time to run a play, where Lamar Jackson would throw a game-ending interception to Kentucky's Mike Edwards.

=== October 13, 2007: (#17) Kentucky 43 – 37 (#1) LSU ===
The 2007 College Football season is widely regarding as one of, if not the greatest seasons in the history of college football. The season was hallmarked with numerous upsets: an unranked or lower-ranked opponent defeated a higher-ranked team 59 times over the course of the regular season. One of the biggest upsets that season was when the Kentucky Wildcats beat the eventual National Champion LSU Tigers in Commonwealth Stadium. LSU would lead early, but the Wildcats would bring the game back from a 13-point deficit in the 3rd Quarter. The game was tied 27–27 at the end of regulation. Kentucky and LSU would trade field goals in Overtime, then, Quarterback Andre Woodson completed a 7-yard touchdown pass to Wide Receiver Stevie Johnson for Kentucky to take the lead. The Wildcats would fail to convert the 2-point conversion attempt, opening the door for LSU to win on the following possession. However, Kentucky would hold the Tigers on 4-straight plays, the final being a stop just inches from the first down marker. In his call, CBS Commentator Brad Nessler would state (in reference to whether or not LSU got the first down on the final play): "I don't know... I don't think so! Kentucky wins!"

=== December 13, 2003: (#8) Kentucky 79 – 74 (#21) Michigan State | The Basketbowl ===
The Basketbowl was a 2003 matchup between basketball rivals Kentucky and Michigan State. What makes this game notable was that the announced crowd of 78,129 set a record for verified attendance at a basketball game in history. The record was later broken at the 2010 NBA All-Star Game (108,713), however the Basketbowl still holds the record for attendance at a college basketball game. Kentucky won the game, never trailing.

== Athletic rivalries ==
Throughout the season in UK Athletics, Kentucky will play their various rivals. When those games are played in Lexington, they are almost always sell-outs. These rivals are:

Historic/defunct

- Centre College
- Transylvania University (The Battle on Broadway)

All sports

- Florida
- Indiana
- Louisville (The Battle For the Bluegrass/The Governor's Cup)
- Tennessee (Border Battle)

Football-only

- Vanderbilt

Basketball-only

- Arkansas
- Duke
- Michigan State
- North Carolina

Soccer-only

- South Carolina (The SEC Derby)

== Student-specific and non-sanctioned traditions ==
=== State Street ===
State Street was a small road off of Kentucky's campus that connected campus to the off-campus housing network around Waller Avenue. Due to the population on the street being exclusively students, many would rush to the street to celebrate particularly important Football and Basketball wins. During the Men's Basketball Team's dominance throughout the 2010s, State Street would become frequently turn into a riot where students would burn couches and flip cars parked on the street. During the 2012 National Championship, State Street made international news from the damage students caused during the riots. In 2023, the university announced it would be clearing State Street to expand the Markey Cancer Center.

=== Keeneland and "The Double" ===
Keeneland is an equine business and racecourse located in Lexington, KY. Due to Kentucky's cultural ties to horse racing, Keeneland has become an important feature of student life at the university.

During each fall semester, there is a roughly one-month span where Kentucky Football and Keeneland have races/games on the same Saturday. Due to Keeneland being run in the morning, Kentucky Football Games scheduled during Keeneland's fall meet are held in the afternoon. It has become tradition for students to go to Keeneland in the morning and the football games in the afternoon—hence "the double."

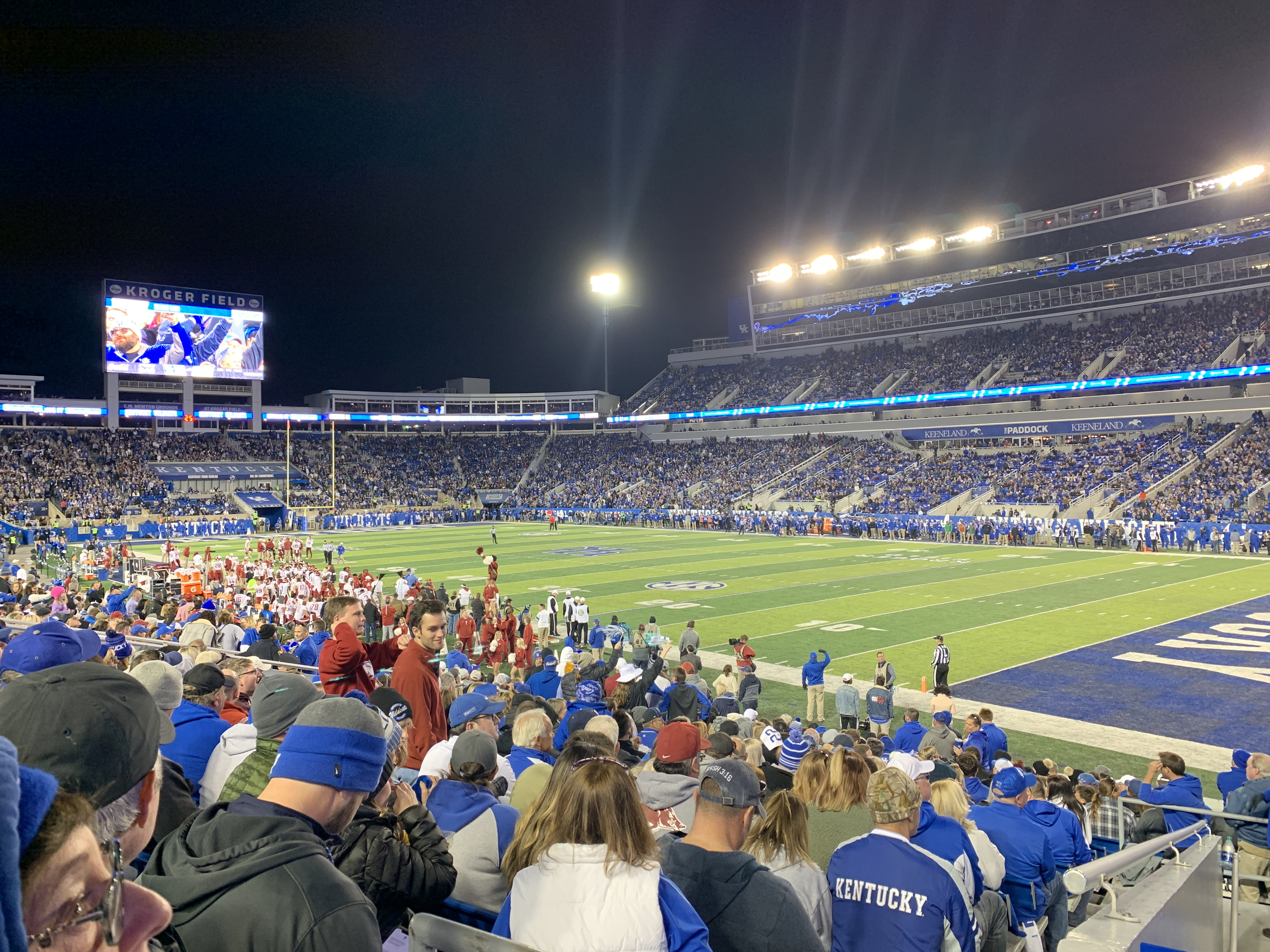
Kroger Field, Home of Kentucky Football

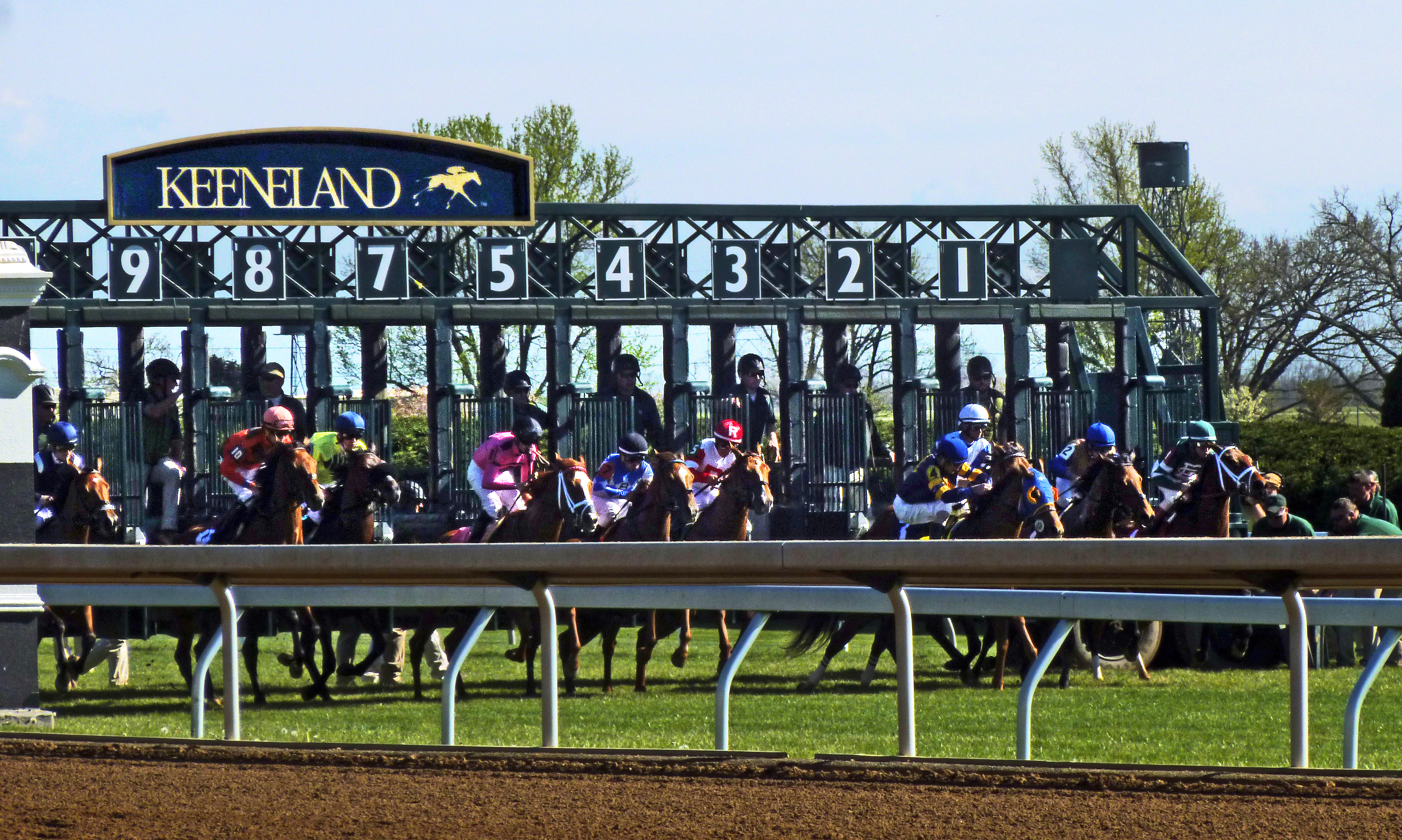
Keeneland Race Course

== Campus traditions ==
=== The Alumni Band and Alumni Cheerleaders ===
During times when the students are on seasonal breaks but there are still volleyball and basketball Games, the university will sometimes call upon the Alumni Band to fill the role of the Student Band. The Alumni Band comprises former UK Students (and BCTC students who was in the band), and has members of all ages. The same can be said for the cheerleaders. When the Cheer team is at the UCA Division I-A College National Championship, the Alumni Cheer Team fills their position.

=== K-Week ===
K-Week is a week long introduction for new students to the university. The week focuses on traditions and getting new freshmen acclimated to University life. The week culminates in one final event at Kroger Field immediately following the Induction Ceremony in Memorial Coliseum. The event introduces a UK T-shirt designed for the freshman class and is worn by students to football games during the year to signify to the rest of the student body what year you are.

=== Homecoming, Senior Night and Military Appreciation Night ===
Each year, the university hosts several nights to honor the family of students and alumni. Homecoming, hosted during the fall semester, is a week dedicated to the return of alumni to campus. The week consists of various events, and culminates in a Homecoming Football game. Senior Night, an annual event in each sport, is usually the last home game of any sport's season. During the game, all seniors are honored on the court/field with flowers, and "My Old Kentucky Home" is played for one final time. In basketball, the Seniors are Honored by having them run through a paper wall with their name on it. Military Appreciation Night, unique to Football, is a night where military alumni are honored on the Football Field. Usually during the game there is a flyover of military aircraft.

=== The Crowd Sings the National Anthem ===
During one surprise Football and Basketball game a season, the national anthem singer is replaced with a "national anthem conductor." During this, the conductor will start the national anthem, but the crowd will sing it the rest of the way through. This is almost exclusively done during sell-outs or big games.

=== Rubbing Patterson's foot ===
Just outside of the Patterson Office Tower is a statue of former University President, James Kennedy Patterson. It is tradition that, if you rub the statue's foot, that you will pass your exams for that cycle. Further, among students, it has been joked that the statue will stand up and salute students who had recently lost their virginity, however this interpretation is not official.

=== William T. Young Library Hill ===
Outside of the William T. Young library, there is a steep hill. During snow days, students will sled down this hill. During the Football Season, if Kentucky is to host College Gameday, this hill is used as the location for broadcast. Lastly, there is a sign at the hill paying homage to the history of fraternities using the location for Tug-of-War, however this no longer occurs.

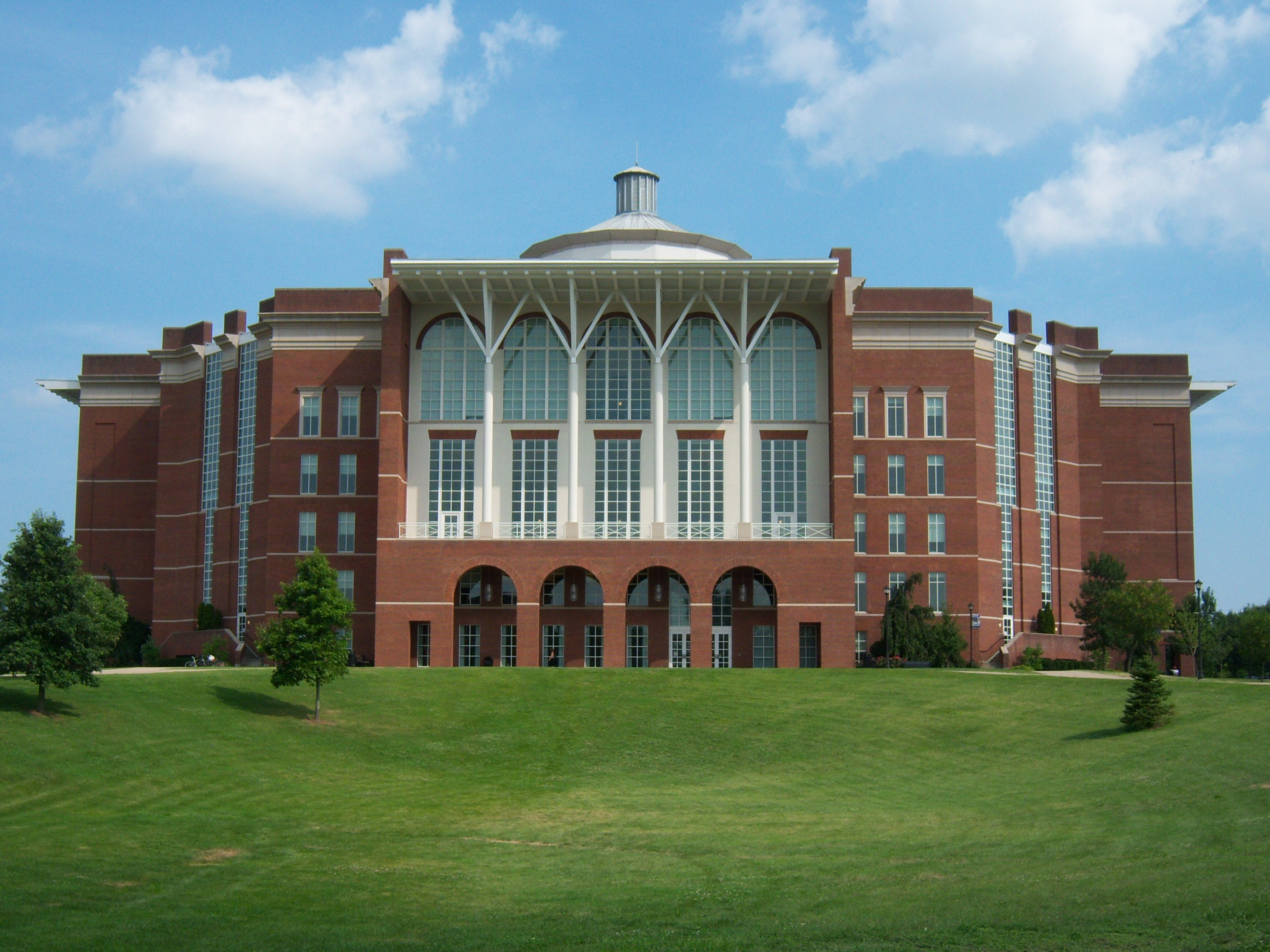
William T. Young Library from the hill's perspective

=== DanceBlue ===
DanceBlue is a charity and event hosted on the campus of the University of Kentucky and throughout the bluegrass region of the state. While DanceBlue is a large organization consisting of numerous events (from their annual 5K to their High School Events), the most well-known event is their 24-Hour Dance Marathon hosted at Historic Memorial Coliseum. The event is an all-day, no sitting, no sleeping dance marathon with a new theme each hour. The goal is to ultimately raise money for the DanceBlue Hematology/Oncology Clinic at Kentucky Children's Hospital.

== Greek life ==
While the exhaustive list of Greek and student life organizations can be found in the article referenced above, there are some notable traditions worth mentioning here.

=== Greek Sing ===
Each year, each of the campus sororities and fraternities compete in a themed dance-off to raise money for the Make-A-Wish Foundation. Most recently, Greek Sing was hosted at Rupp Arena.

== Famous locations on and around campus ==
=== The Wildcat Alumni Plaza ===
On Avenue of Champions, across from Historic Memorial Coliseum, is The Wildcat Alumni Plaza. This plaza, home to the Wildcat Statue "Bowman," is where alumni can purchase bricks honoring their time at the University of Kentucky. Bowman is often “patted for luck” by students—some even ride the statue for graduation photos.

=== Bookstores and student centers ===
- Gatton Student Center: The Gatton Student Center was built 1938 and remodeled into its modern form in 2018.
- Kennedy Bookstore/Wildcat Den: Opened in 1950, Kennedy's bookstore was a privately owned bookstore on the corner of Avenue of Champions and South Limestone. The bookstore was the only alternative location to buy textbooks and university merchandise outside of the Student Center Bookstore. In December 2017, Joe Kennedy (the original founder, at the time, 92 years old) announced he was selling the bookstore to the University of Kentucky. The university later bulldozed the building and built the Cornerstone lounge and parking lot.
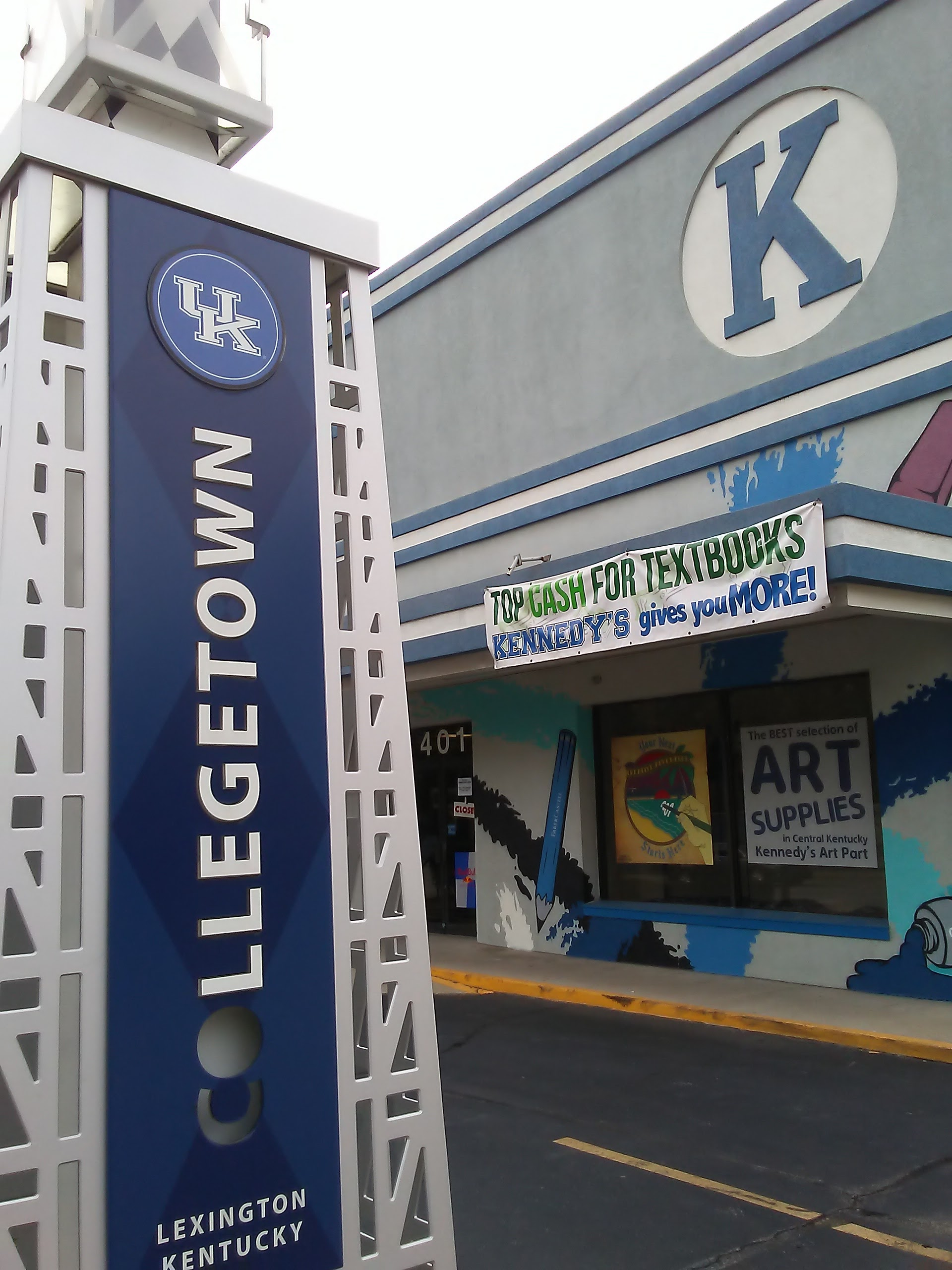
  "Collegetown" sign in front of Kennedy Bookstore

=== The Tolly-Ho ===
Famous for being open 24–7, the Tolly-Ho (or just, "The Ho") is a diner that has become a fixture of university life. Opened in 1971, the Tolly-Ho has existed in multiple locations, now being located at 350 Foreman Avenue, just off campus. The Tolly-Ho is famous for its wall of "Fraternity and Sorority paddles," honoring the Greek life on campus.

=== Bars ===
The University of Kentucky is home to various famous bars on and off campus. As of 2025, there are 8 bars that the City of Lexington deems "College Bars": Charlie Brown's, The Break Room, The Beer Trappe, McCarthy's Irish Bar, The Paddock Bar, Tin Roof, Stagger Inn, and Two Keys Tavern. There are other bars around campus, however, these are the 8 listed by the city in official capacity. Additionally, there are two locations where sports media organizations (CBS, ESPN, etc.) will film crowd reactions during big games (such as March Madness). These two locations are the KSBar and LexLive!.
