= Memorial Hall (University of Kentucky) =

Landmark building on the University of Kentucky campus

Coordinates: 38°2′12.58″N 84°30′23.30″W

Memorial Hall (UK building number 0049), located at 610 South Limestone Street is a prominent building on the campus of the University of Kentucky.

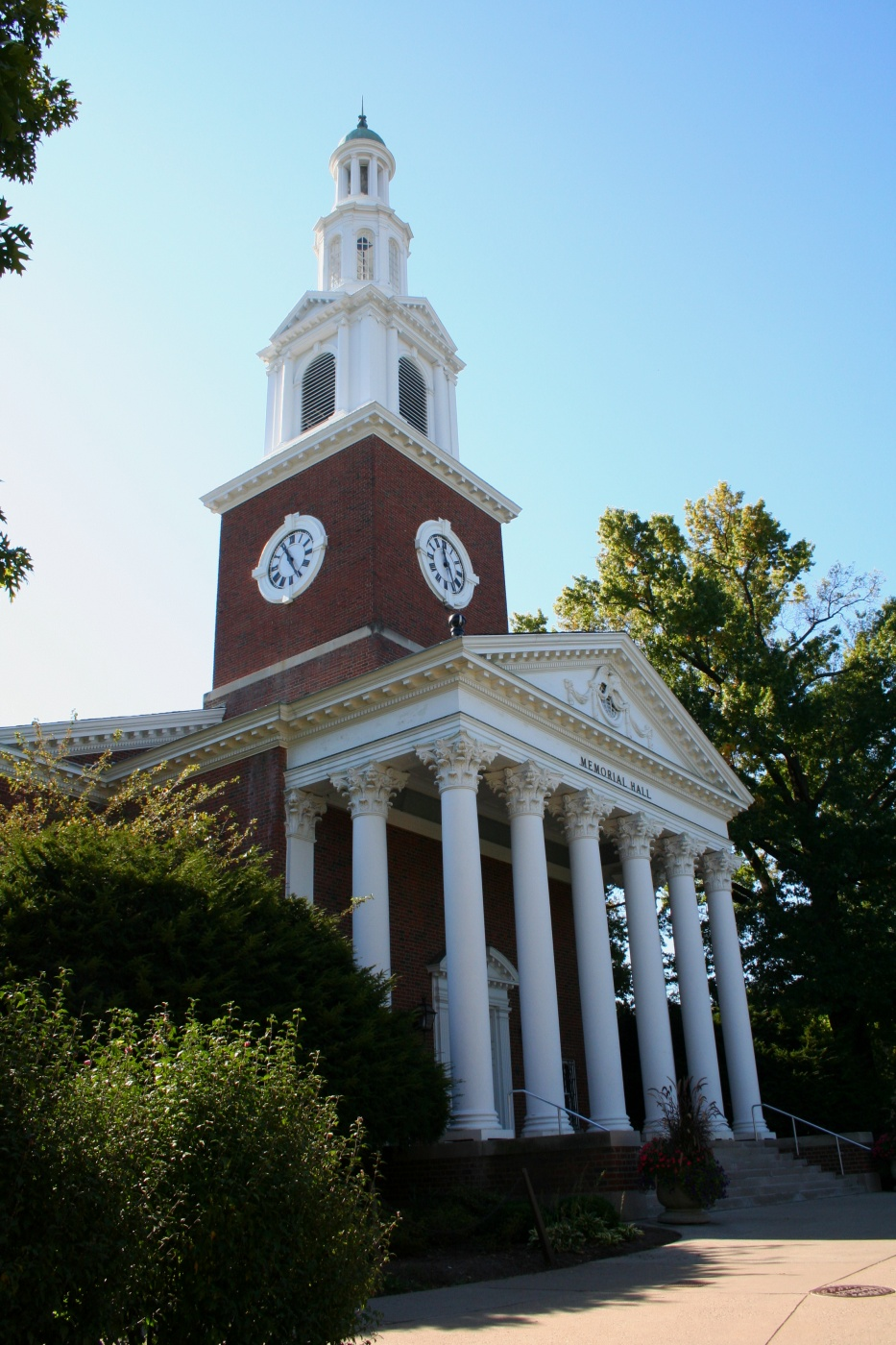
Memorial Hall clock tower

University Logo featuring an image of the Memorial Hall clocktower

It is approximately 17,012 square feet and 130 feet tall. The building's construction was funded by donations and individual contributions over a ten-year period through a subscription to the university, beginning in 1919. Completed in 1929 as a memorial to those who died in World War I, it is used for lectures and performances, and also serves as a site for graduation ceremonies of some colleges within the university. From 1969 to 1970 major renovations of the interior of the building took place. The additions include new flooring, seating, powder rooms, lighting, and air conditioning. It is located on central campus at the end of Funkhouser Drive.

The building is a symbol of the University of Kentucky, often used in promotions and advertising. Its clock tower is known for being featured in the UK logo, between the U and the K. Memorial Hall features cases within its traverse central hall that hold the names of students that served in the World Wars from all the Kentucky counties.

On May 4, 2004, the University of Kentucky Board of Trustees approved the naming of the main auditorium in Memorial Hall in honor of Edward T. (Ned) Breathitt, a former Kentucky governor and former chair of the UK Board of Trustees. Room 102 in Memorial Hall is now known as the Edward T. (Ned) Breathitt Auditorium.

== Funding ==
Funding for the building of Memorial Hall was acquired in Kentucky through a ten-year campaign from 1919 to 1929. The goal was to raise $300,000, but they ended up only raising $115,000, which is $185,000 under the goal. Alone, the structure of the building cost $107,250 and adding the outdoor and indoor features the total for construction was $135,000.

== Ann Rice O'Hanlon ==
Ann Rice O’Hanlon was a Kentucky native who was well known for her artwork across Kentucky. After graduating from the University of Kentucky, the director of the UK Art Department invited her back to create a fresco mural. This would be one of its first in the state of Kentucky to be created. The canvas was a 40 ft by 8 ft wall located in Memorial Hall and the subject of the mural was the history of Kentucky.

The fresco technique uses powdered pigments, water, and lime-plaster applied to a canvas. This takes a tremendous amount of confidence, speed, and patience because the plaster mix dries quickly and only can be applied in increments. Therefore, once the lime plaster dries, the mural is attached to the wall and makes it difficult to remove.

When Ann O'Hanlon created the fresco, she visualized Kentucky into different layers. Each layer describes the different generations of Kentucky and how Kentuckians have transformed. The first layer showcases the settlers in central Kentucky. The middle layers demonstrate the advancements in science, technology, engineering, math, and medicine. Lastly, the third layer brings everything together and shows the progress that Kentucky has made over the different generations. Her perception of Kentucky was revealed during the Great Depression. This allowed Ms. O’Hanlon to gain relevant information about the history of the state.

== Fresco controversy ==
The lobby of Memorial Hall features a forty-foot fresco completed in 1934 by Lexington artist Ann Rice O'Hanlon. The fresco, which is one of the few of its size and scale in the United States, depicts the history of Lexington and central Kentucky from settler times through the 19th century. O'Hanlon received a grant through the Works Progress Administration for the completion of its project, and worked on it for months. The fresco has been the recipient of controversy over its racial depictions. In a 1964 interview, found in the Archives of American Art's New Deal and the Arts project, O'Hanlon addressed her depictions of African Americans in the mural, but did not elaborate on her decision to place images of slaves in the center of the painting. She claimed that the painting was completed before there was much racism in Kentucky and that the state was not as segregated as other southern states (https://www.aaa.si.edu/collections/interviews/oral-history-interview-ann-rice-ohanlon-12570). The fresco in the foyer has been criticized for its romanticized depiction of African American slaves. Students have tried to get the mural removed since at least 2006 and it has been shrouded more than once. Due to these protests, UK commissioned Karyn Olivier to create a new painting in Memorial Hall to add context to the already existing mural. This piece was named "Witness" and it re-contextualized many of the slave figures featured in the original fresco. In 2015, sheets were placed over the mural because of the nationwide controversy it drew.

In the wake of the George Floyd protests, UK President Eli Capilouto announced on June 5, 2020, that the mural would be removed, becoming one of several memorials and depictions so removed. In his announcement, Eli Capilouto said, "We have not been immune from racial prejudice and hate, but I believe deeply that there is a commitment to doing better tomorrow than we are doing today. It’s against that imperfect and human backdrop that I am directing our facilities team to immediately begin the process of removing the mural in Memorial Hall." As of February 2021, the mural has still not been taken down.

On July 6, 2020, a lawsuit was filed against Eli Capilouto and UK. Wendell Berry filed a lawsuit to halt the removal of the mural because it was publicly funded, which means that it was publicly owned, along with many other reasons such as the difficulty of removing the mural because it is a fresco. A fresco is created by applying paint to a wall while the plaster is still wet, so the fresco is essentially baked into the wall, making it extremely difficult to remove. Berry originally filed for injunctive relief for the mural, but it was denied.

== Witness ==
On August 15, 2018, Karyn Olivier was chosen by the Memorial Hall Committee to create a mural in the Memorial Hall building. Olivier notes that it wasn't her place to simply paint something that equates to the O'Hanlon mural. In fact, she even admits that she doesn't want the mural to be taken down because she'd "rather see an acknowledgement of slavery than no slavery at all." O'Hanlon's mural depicts that Kentucky was built on the backs of slaves, and Olivier wanted to honor black and brown Kentuckians by creating Witness. She hoped that using colors like gold would help to elevate oppressed figures and give a sense of "rebirth". Her painting can be found on the dome ceiling inside the building where the, "work would create a new context and new lens through which to view, critique and wrestle with O'Hanlon's mural."

== See also ==
- Buildings at the University of Kentucky
- Cityscape of Lexington, Kentucky
- University of Kentucky
