= Ann Rice O'Hanlon =

American painter (1908–1998)

- Born: June 21, 1908; Ashland, Kentucky
- Died: 1998 (aged 89–90)
- Known for: painting, muralist
- Spouse: Richard O'Hanlon

Ann Louise Rice O'Hanlon (June 21, 1908 – 1998) was a 20th-century American visual artist who painted murals. O'Hanlon is best known for a fresco painted on the wall of Memorial Hall at the University of Kentucky in 1934 for the Treasury Relief Art Project. The fresco has repeatedly attracted negative attention for what many view as its romanticized depiction of African American slaves. In 2020 University of Kentucky President Eli Capilouto announced the fresco would be removed.

== Early life and education ==
Ann Louise Rice was born in Ashland, Kentucky, the oldest of five siblings. From a young age, Rice showed an interest in art. Rice graduated from the University of Kentucky in Lexington, Kentucky with a Bachelor of Art Degree as an art major in 1932. Rice attended the California School of Fine Arts in San Francisco for two years of post graduate training. Rice met Richard 'Dick' O'Hanlon, an artist, from Long Beach, California while attending school in California. They married and relocated to Kentucky in 1934.

== Career as artist ==
=== University of Kentucky, Memorial Hall fresco ===
O'Hanlon began working as an artist during the Great Depression in the United States. In order to provide work for unemployed artists, the United States Federal Government commissioned art projects. Through the Treasury Relief Art Project of the U.S. Treasury Department, O'Hanlon was commissioned to create a fresco for the foyer of Memorial Hall on the campus of the University of Kentucky. O'Hanlon painted a 40-foot (12 m) fresco which tells the history of Kentucky from the time of settlement through the 19th century.

The fresco has repeatedly attracted negative attention for what many view as its romanticized depiction of African American slaves. In a 1964 interview, O'Hanlon addressed the depictions of African Americans in the painting, but did not elaborate on her decision to include representations of slaves in the center of the mural. Further, she claimed that during her childhood, there was not much racism and that Kentucky was more "tolerant" than other Southern states. In 2006, the Student Government Association attempted to have the mural removed. In November 2015 after a meeting with minority students at the University of Kentucky, University President Eli Capilouto, announced on a blog post and by email that the wall with the fresco would be shrouded until the university community comes to a permanent decision about how to deal with the fresco.

== Career as educator ==
O'Hanlon started and taught at the Art Department at Dominican College in San Rafael, California.

== Sight & Insight Art Center ==
In 1942, the O'Hanlon's bought a dairy farm in Marin County, California, and converted it into an art studio and their home. They opened up the land and buildings to artists. On the property the O'Hanlon's founded the Sight & Insight Art Center in 1969. After their death the organization continues as the O'Hanlon Center for the Arts.
