= Karyn Olivier =

American artist (born 1968)

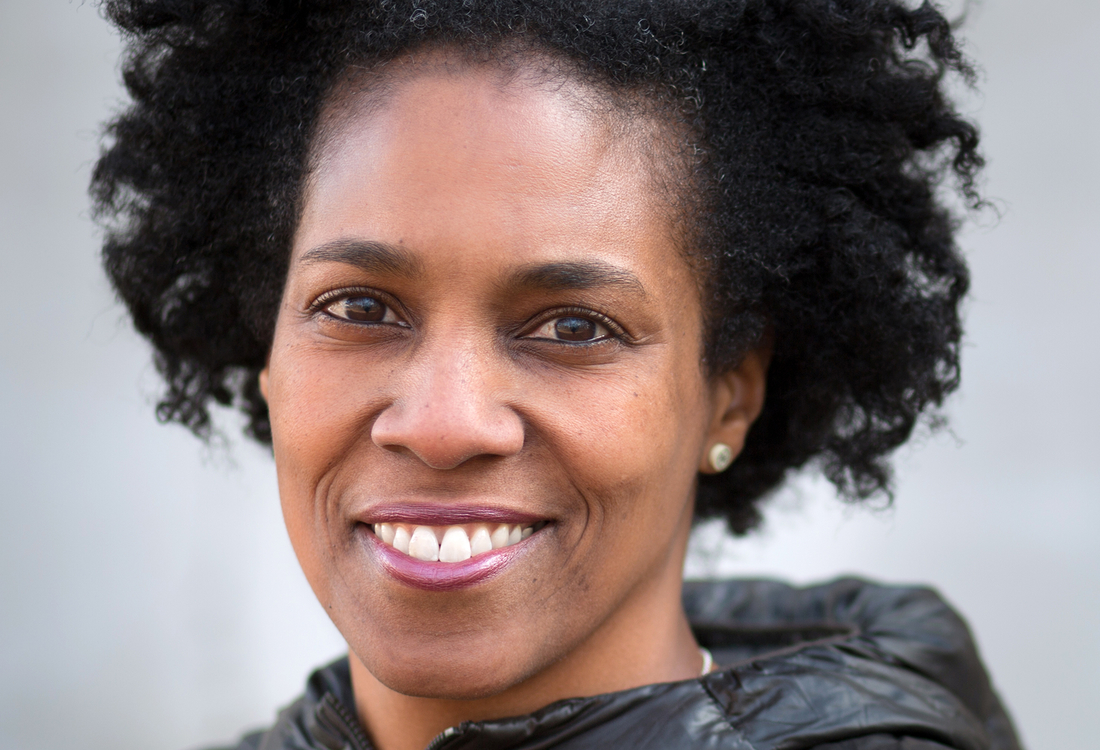
- Born: 1968 (age 57–58); Port of Spain, Trinidad and Tobago
- Education: BA Dartmouth College, MFA Cranbrook Academy of Art
- Known for: Public Art, installation, sculpture, social practice, photography

Karyn Olivier (born 1968) is a Philadelphia-based artist who creates public art, sculptures, installations and photography. Olivier alters familiar objects, spaces, and locations, often reinterpreting the role of monuments. Her work intersects histories and memories with present-day narratives.

== Early life and education ==
Olivier was born in 1968 in Port of Spain, Trinidad and Tobago, where she and her twin sister lived with their family before they moved to Brooklyn, New York, in early childhood. Olivier received a BA in psychology from Dartmouth College in 1989 and an MFA in ceramics from Cranbrook Academy of Art in 2001. She now resides in the Germantown neighborhood of Philadelphia, Pennsylvania. She is also an associate professor in the Sculpture department at the Tyler School of Art at Temple University in Philadelphia, Pennsylvania.

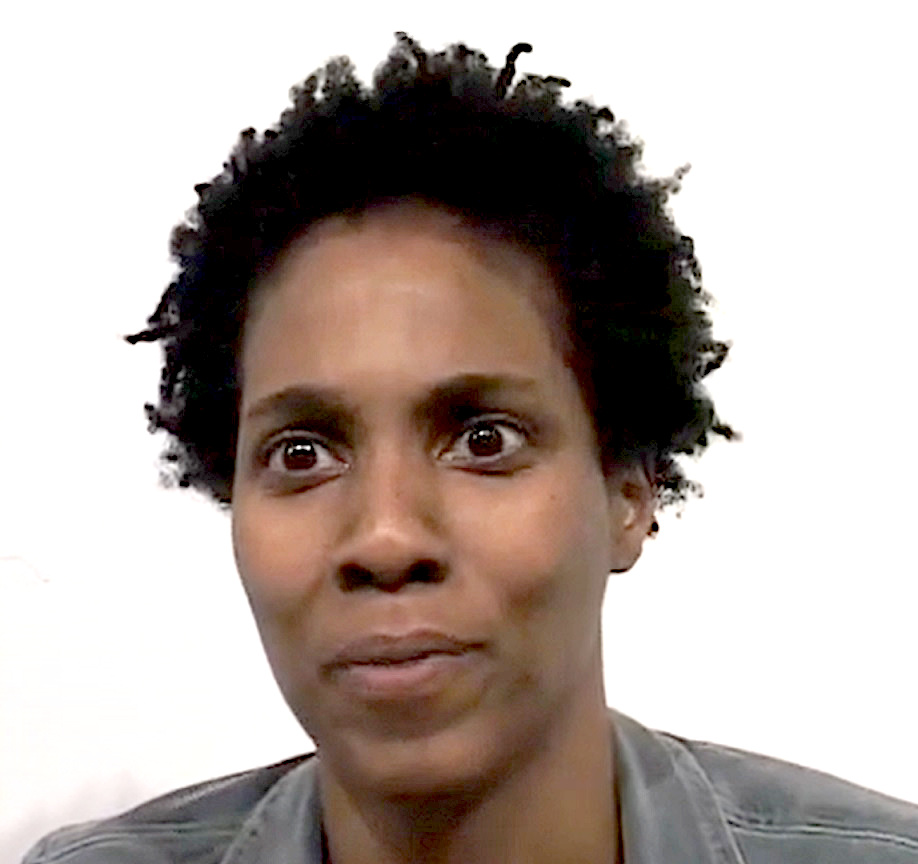
Karyn Olivier, 2009

== Work ==
In Olivier's work, familiar objects, spaces and locations are altered in function and medium to create uncanny meditations on stagnancy, division and the weight of materiality. Her sculptures, installations and public art explore the politics and poetics of space, and the role of viewers in shaping their own experience and engagement. Olivier has been engaging with and reinterpreting the role of monuments creating both temporary and permanent sculptures, installations and "monuments."

=== Selected works ===
The Battle Is Joined (2017) was a temporary public sculpture in collaboration with Monument Lab and Mural Arts Program. Olivier concealed the Battle of Germantown Memorial (Vernon Park, Philadelphia) with a mirrored acrylic structure. This "initiated" a conversation between two monuments in the park—Pastorius Monument, which honors Francis Daniel Pastorius, a German settler who led the first Quaker protest against slavery in 1688, and the Battle of Germantown Memorial, honoring a failed George Washington-led revolutionary war battle. Hyperallergic's Samantha Mitchell commented "Karyn Olivier's "The Battle is Joined" approaches the question of what might be done with existing monuments to update their contemporary resonance. Surrounded by a full-scale box made of mirrored Plexiglas, the original monument is turned into a shimmering, reflective void, almost invisible from some angles, mirroring both a dense green canopy of leaves and a bustling but economically depressed strip of Germantown Avenue bordering the park. Altering the face of this often-overlooked monument to early American history to make it an inclusive reflection of the present community has particular resonance for Olivier, who lives in Germantown and has spent a lot of time discussing the monument with her neighbors.

Witness (2018) At the University of Kentucky's Memorial Hall, Olivier created a permanent site-specific installation. She reproduced the African American and Native American figures from a controversial New Deal-era fresco inserting these images onto the domed ceiling of the vestibule, which she had gold-leafed. Four portraits of important (but under recognized) individuals in Kentucky's history are presented in the circular medallions below the ceiling. Around the base of the dome is a Frederick Douglass quote: "There is not a man beneath the canopy of heaven, that does not know that slavery is wrong for him." The Herald-Leader Editorial Board said "What a beautiful — literally, beautiful — response to concerns that a New Deal-era mural at the University of Kentucky was racially insensitive to 21st century viewers."

Here and Now/Glacier, Shard, Rock (2015) was Part of Creative Time's exhibition Drifting in Daylight. Olivier created a lenticular billboard that blended contrasting topographic and anthropologic histories through three images—a glacier, a pottery shard from the historic Seneca Village settlement, and an image of the contemporary landscape. The Wisconsin Glacier travelled through what is now New York City, 20,000 years ago. Seneca Village was a vibrant Manhattan settlement founded by free black property owners who were displaced when the city claimed the right of 'eminent domain' to purchase their properties and develop Central Park. As noted in Nature's Nation: American Art and Environment "As one observer explained, the work "elegantly reminds us of the constantly mutable nature of the park and its history," including its geological past and its modern political ecology. Here and Now reframed Olmsted's picturesque landscape from Olivier's viewpoint as an African American woman attentive to human difference and non-human agency."

== Other activities ==
Olivier served on the jury that chose the winners of the Rome Prize for the 2023–24 cycle, co-chaired by Naomi Beckwith and Fred Wilson.

== Awards, grants, residencies ==
=== Awards ===
- The American Academy of Arts and Letters Award in Art, 2020
- The Pew Center for Arts and Heritage 2019 Fellow, 2019
- The Rome Prize, The American Academy in Rome, 2018
- New York Foundation for the Arts (NYFA) Award, 2011
- William H Johnson Prize, 2010
- William H Johnson Prize–Finalist Prize, 2009
- The Joan Mitchell Foundation Award, 2007
- Louis Comfort Tiffany Foundation Biennial Award, 2003

=== Grants ===
- Harpo Foundation Grant, 2014
- The Pollock-Krasner Foundation Grant, 2013
- The John Simon Guggenheim Foundation Fellowship, 2007
- Art Matters Grant, 2007
- Creative Capital Grant, 2005
- Emerging Artists Fellowship, Socrates Sculpture Park, Long Island City, New York, 2004
- Cultural Arts Council of Houston and Harris County, Individual Artist Grant, 2003

=== Residencies ===
- Lehigh University, Horger Artist in Residence, Bethlehem, PA, 2018
- The Cynthia Woods Mitchell Center for the Arts, University of Houston, Houston, Texas, 2009
- The Studio Museum in Harlem, New York City, 2005–2006
- The Marie Walsh Sharpe Foundation Space Program, New York City, 2004–2005
- Museum of Fine Arts Houston, Core Program, Houston, Texas, 2001–2003
- Skowhegan School of Painting and Sculpture, Skowhegan, Maine, 2000

== Exhibitions ==
=== Solo (select) ===
2020
"Everything That's Alive Moves," Institute of Contemporary Art, Philadelphia, January 24 – May 10, 2020

2019
When I See It, Stockton University Art Gallery, Galloway, NJ, September 4 – November 12, 2019
Because Time In This Place Does Not Obey An Order, Le Murate Progetti Arte Contemporanea, Florence, Italy, February 8 – March 16, 2019

2018
Karyn Olivier, Lehigh University Art Galleries and Teaching Museum, Lehigh University, Bethlehem, PA, January 24 – May 25, 2018

2014
Eye Around Matter, Marso Galería Arte Contemporáneo, Mexico City, Mexico, April 3 – May 31, 2014

2009
Road Signs, Moores Opera House, University of Houston, Houston, Texas (video premiere and live performance), November 16, 2009

2007
A Closer Look, Laumeier Sculpture Park, St. Louis, MO, February 9 – May 15, 2007

2006
Factory Installed, Mattress Factory, Pittsburgh, PA, April 2 – September 10, 2006

2005
Time to go home, Dunn and Brown Contemporary, Dallas, TX, October 28 – December 17, 2005

=== Group (select) ===
2019
Silence is a Fence for Wisdom, Arte in Memoria Biennale 10, Rome, Italy
Δx (Displacement), American Academy in Rome Gallery, Rome, Italy, February 20 – March 31, 2019
Emanation 2019, Museum of American Glass, Wheaton Arts and Cultural Center, Millville, NJ, April 12 – December 31, 2019

2017
The Battle is Joined, Mural Arts/Monument Lab, commission, Vernon Park, Philadelphia, PA, September 16 – November 19, 2017
The Expanded Caribbean: Contemporary Photography at the Crossroads, Leonard Pearlstein Gallery, Drexel University, Philadelphia, PA, September 19 – December 10

2015
Drifting in Daylight, Creative Time, Central Park, NY, NY, May 15 – June 20, 2015
Particle, Ronald Feldman Gallery, NY, NY, February 14 – March 21, 2015

2014
How the Light Gets In: Recent Work by Seven Former Core Fellows, Glassell School of Art, Museum of Fine Arts Houston, Houston, TX

2009
30 Seconds off an Inch, Studio Museum in Harlem, New York, NY, November 12, 2009—March 14, 2010
Rockstone and Bootheel: Contemporary West Indian Art, Real Art Ways, Hartford, CT, November 14, 2009—March 14, 2010

2007
Black Light/White Noise, Contemporary Arts Museum Houston, Houston, TX, May 26 – August 5, 2007

2006
Trace, Whitney Museum of American Art, New York, NY, June 30 – November 12, 2006
Quid Pro Quo, Studio Museum in Harlem, New York, NY, July 19 – October 22, 2006
Insight Out, Wanås Foundation, Knislinge, Sweden

2005
Frequency, Studio Museum in Harlem, New York, NY, November 9, 2005—March 12, 2006
Greater New York 2005, MoMA P.S.1, Long Island City, NY, March 13 – September 26, 2005
Double Consciousness: Black Conceptual Art since 1970, Contemporary Art Museum, Houston, TX, January 22 – April 17, 2005

2004
Emerging Artists Fellowship Exhibition, Socrates Sculpture Park, Long Island City, NY, September 12, 2004—March 6, 2005
In Practice Series, SculptureCenter, Long Island City, NY, January 11 – April 11, 2004
African American Art from the Permanent Collection, Museum of Fine Arts Houston, Houston, TX, February 22 – May 9, 2004

2003
Sweet Dreams, Soap Factory, Minneapolis, MN

== Professional academic career ==
Olivier is an associate professor of sculpture at Tyler School of Art and Architecture, Temple University. From 2005 to 2007 she was a sculpture faculty member at Milton Avery Graduate School of the Arts at Bard College. Prior to her appointment to Tyler School of Art and Architecture, she was an assistant sculpture professor and Ceramics Department Head at the University of Houston's School of Art.
