= Gatton Student Center =

University of Kentucky student activity center

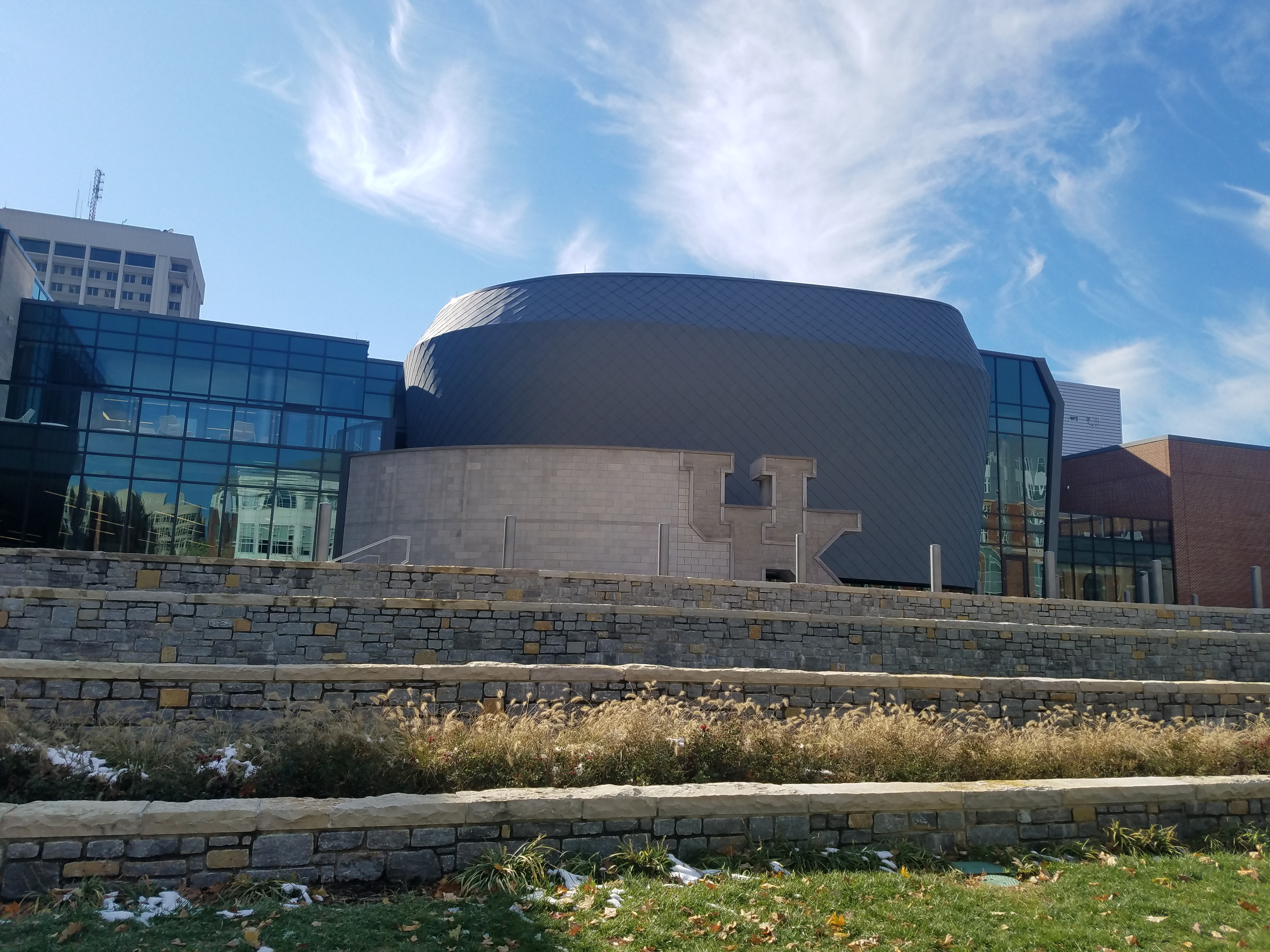
- Gatton Student Center located on the University of Kentucky's campus in Lexington, Kentucky
- Alternative names: University of Kentucky Student Center

General information
- Type: Student Union
- Location: University of Kentucky, 160, Ave of Champions, Lexington, KY 40508, Lexington, KY, United States

The Gatton Student Center is a student activity center for meetings, conferences, meals, recreation, and shopping for students on the University of Kentucky campus in Lexington, Kentucky. The building houses University of Kentucky's student service offices, as well as many dining and recreational facilities. The original building was constructed in 1938 and remodeled in 2018.

== History ==
Before being renamed to "Gatton Student Center" in 2018, the original University of Kentucky's student center was completed in 1938; with renovation additions happening in 1963 and 1982. Beginning in 2014, the University of Kentucky Student Center would undergo a series of remodels and expansions resulting in the Gatton Student Center, a US$200 million, 330,000 square foot building. Construction of the Gatton Student Center was finalized in 2018, two years after its projected grand opening in 2016. The original 1938 ballroom and Great Hall, which feature wrought-iron rails and decorations made by UK engineering students in the campus forge, are being preserved. They were designed by architect Ernst Johnson; many other buildings designed by Johnson for the university have since been torn down and replaced.

The most recent renovation to the building, beginning in 2014, The Gatton Student Center was designed by Omni Architects company and Perkins + Will. Foodservice design was provided by Tipton Associates, APAC.

=== The building ===
The Gatton Student Center is named after Bill Gatton, an alumnus of the University of Kentucky; he donated $20,000,000 to fund the project, so the building was named after him. It includes a dining hall, a 30,000 sq. ft bookstore and an Apple Store. It also houses the Office of Student Organizations and Activities, the Center for Student Involvement, the Student Activities Board, the Student Government Association, the Center for Community Outreach, DanceBlue, the WRFL radio station, the Office of LGBTQ* Resources and the Martin Luther King Center.

The Alumni Gym Fitness Center building was a basketball court from 1924 to 1950; it was remodeled in 1937 and again in 1982. It has over 200 pieces of exercise equipment.
