= Main Building (University of Kentucky) =

Four-story administration and classroom building for the University of Kentucky

Coordinates: 38.038885°N 84.504792°W

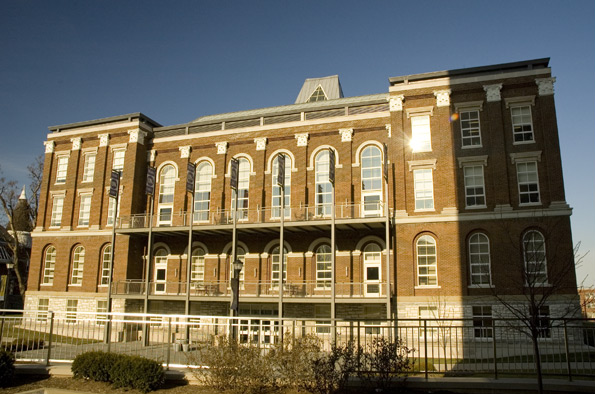
Main Building's rear taken from the Patterson Office Tower.

Main Building is a four-story administration and classroom building for the University of Kentucky in Lexington, Kentucky. It houses some administrative offices for the university, the President's office, numerous conference rooms, several classrooms, and a visitors center.

== History ==
Dedicated on February 15, 1882, the Main Building is the only extant building among the four that originally housed State College. It was designed using brick, embellished with stone work, and was completed at a cost of $81,000. Previous funding attempts had failed, which led State College President James Patterson to pledge his entire personal wealth "as collateral" to see the project completed.

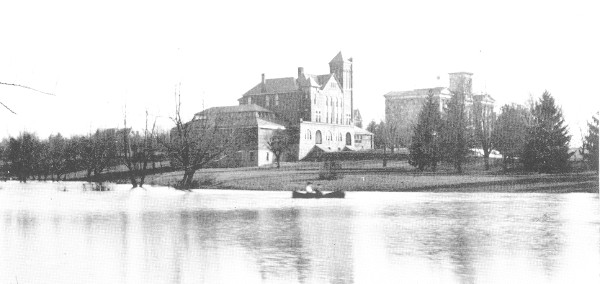
Barker Hall (center) and the Main Building (right), sometime before 1919.

The original Main Building featured a 157 ft (48 m) high cupola with a clock and the "captain's walk" used by the local Weather Observatory. Between the building's completion and 1919, the cupola progressively shrank in size; after 1919, the roof took on a "gabled appearance" that characterized the structure until the fire in 2001. During the administration of President Henry Barker (1911–1917), there was a plan to reconstruct the front of the Main Building to include stone pillars, but this was abandoned soon after it was initiated. In 1918, a campus post office and bookstore were located in the basement; both were relocated in 1925. In 1919, a cafeteria was added, but this was removed in 1929.

The building originally housed the campus offices for the State College, along with several classrooms. It also contained the college armory, classrooms used by the Commandant of Cadets, a shop, the President's office, a natural history museum, two laboratories, and housed the Normal, French, German, English, Mathematics, Classical and Preparatory departments. There was also room available for a small chapel that could house the entire student population, faculty, and staff, and for the Kentucky Geological Survey.

It was renamed the Administration Building in 1948.

On April 4, 2000, the Administration Building became a focal point for students protesting the university's contract with Nike, a company they accused of using sweatshop labor. Eighteen students locked themselves together in the basement of the building. Early the next morning, twelve students were arrested and charged with trespassing and harassment.

== May 15, 2001 fire ==
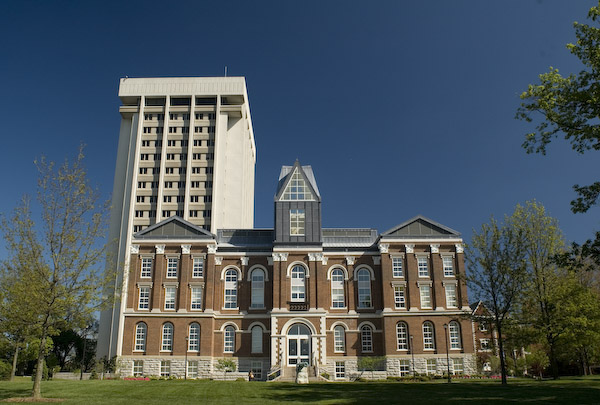
The Main Building in the foreground and the Patterson Office Tower in the background.

The Main Building was extensively damaged during renovations due to fire on May 15, 2001. A soldering iron being used on the copper cornice caused the fire that destroyed the roof, gutted the upper two floors, and left the lower floors flooded and damaged by water. On June 20, the University of Kentucky Board of Trustees approved a plan to restore and reconstruct the Administration Building and design work for the new facility began a few days afterward.

The cost of the reconstruction was $17,350,000. Before reconstruction, there was approximately 30,700 sq ft (2,850 m^{2}). available that featured wide hallways and makeshift offices subdivided from large rooms. After the reconstruction, the building has four public floors (basement, 1st, 2nd & 3rd), plus a mechanical penthouse. The building now features 43,243 sq ft (4,017.4 m^{2}). and includes two balconies in the rear overlooking Patterson Plaza. It was reopened on October 25, 2004.

== See also ==
- Buildings at the University of Kentucky
- Cityscape of Lexington, Kentucky
- University of Kentucky
