= Henry Stites Barker =

American academic administrator (1850–1928)

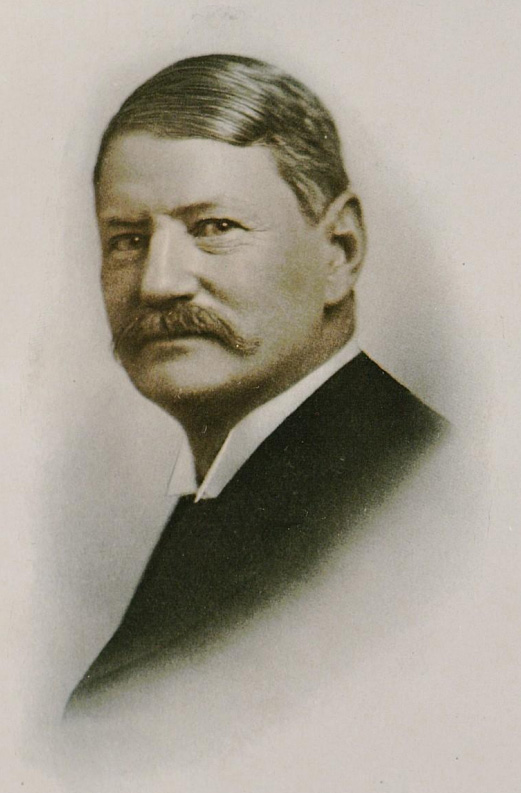
- Barker pictured in The Kentuckian 1911, Kentucky yearbook

2nd President of the University of Kentucky
- In office 1911–1917
- Preceded by: James Kennedy Patterson
- Succeeded by: Frank L. McVey

Personal details
- Born: July 23, 1850 Christian County, Kentucky
- Died: April 23, 1928 (aged 77) Jeffersonville, Indiana

Henry Stites Barker (July 23, 1850 – April 23, 1928) was the second president of the University of Kentucky from 1911 to 1917.

Barker was born in 1850 at Newstead in Christian County, Kentucky and grew up in Louisville, Kentucky. He attended UK (then called the Agricultural and Mechanical College of Kentucky), before dropping out to study law. He served as Louisville City Attorney from 1887 to 1896. He served as Judge of the Jefferson Circuit Court (Criminal Division) and Judge of the Kentucky Court of Appeals from 1903 to 1911, serving in his final year as its chief justice.

In 1910, he was selected by the UK Board of Trustees to be the next president of the university. His predecessor, James K. Patterson, was often openly critical of Barker's administration and reluctant to cede control of the institution. Despite these roadblocks, Barker started a graduate school at the university as well as several other major improvements. Reserve Officers' Training Corps was started on the campus during his tenure and the school's ROTC building is named Barker Hall.

Despite these and many more accomplishments, Patterson and his allies continued to oppose him until he resigned in 1917. He returned to his law practice in Louisville, and was later elected again to a judgeship. He died on April 23, 1928, in nearby Jeffersonville, Indiana.
