= Lee T. Todd Jr. =

American academic administrator

Lee Todd Jr.
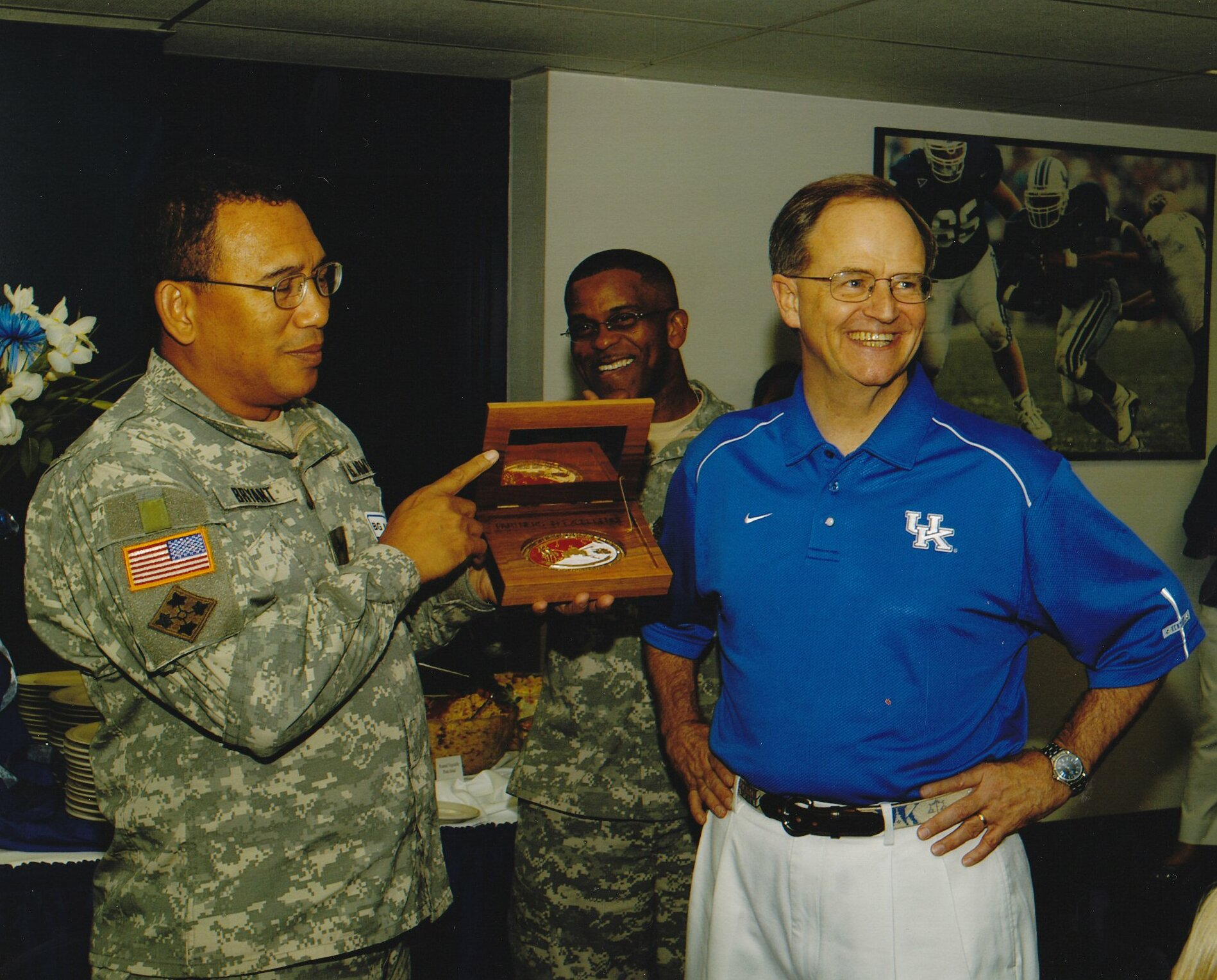
- Todd in 2005

11th President of the University of Kentucky
- In office July 1, 2001 – June 30, 2011
- Preceded by: Charles T. Wethington Jr.
- Succeeded by: Eli Capilouto

Personal details
- Born: May 6, 1946 (age 79) Earlington, Kentucky

Lee Trover Todd Jr. (born May 6, 1946) is an American who served as the 11th president of the University of Kentucky in Lexington, Kentucky.

== Early life and education ==
Todd was born in 1946 in Earlington, Kentucky, a small town close to Madisonville. He earned a bachelor's degree in electrical engineering from the University of Kentucky in 1968. He went on to earn his master's and doctoral degrees in electrical engineering from the Massachusetts Institute of Technology in 1970 and 1973. Todd studied at MIT thanks in part to a fellowship from the Hertz Foundation, following a personal encouragement from Edward Teller. He returned to UK in 1974 and served as an electrical engineering associate professor until 1983.

Lee Todd has been known to attend most home basketball games, and would commonly sit by Kentucky Governor Steve Beshear and his family.

== Retirement ==
On September 8, 2010, Todd announced that he would step down as president effective June 30, 2011. Todd remained on the faculty at the university, serving as a Professor of Electrical Engineering.
