= Patterson Office Tower =

High-rise building on the University of Kentucky

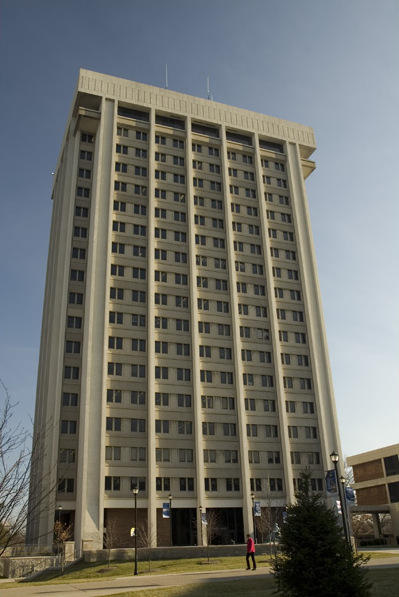
- Patterson Office Tower in 2006

- Location within Kentucky

General information
- Type: Office building
- Architectural style: Brutalism
- Location: University of Kentucky, 120 Patterson Drive, Lexington, Kentucky, United States
- Coordinates: 38.0386°N 84.5064°W
- Construction started: 1967
- Construction stopped: 1968
- Opened: 1969
- Cost: Unknown

Height
- Height: 250 feet (76 m)

Technical details
- Material: concrete
- Floor count: 18
- Lifts/elevators: 6

Design and construction
- Architect: Johnson Romanowitz Architects

Website
- ukcc.uky.edu/cgi-bin/dynamo?maps.391+campus+0027

The Patterson Office Tower is a 250-foot (76 m) high-rise building on the University of Kentucky (UK) campus in Lexington, Kentucky. It is UK's only current high-rise following the 2020 demolition of the Kirwan–Blanding residence hall complex, which had included two 264-foot (80 m) towers.

It was completed in 1969 and is named after James Kennedy Patterson, who served as the school's first president from 1869 to 1910. It primarily houses faculty offices and conference rooms, including many of the offices of the College of Arts and Sciences, College of Social Work, Honors at UK, the Dean of Students and Division of Student Affairs. It is located near the White Hall Classroom Building and Main Building. A statue of Patterson sits near the tower.

== History ==
In 1966, the board of trustees received models for construction of the tower and the White Hall Classroom building. Construction of the Patterson Office Tower began in 1967 and was completed in 1969. The building was named after James Kennedy Patterson, who served as the first president of the University of Kentucky from 1869 to 1910. It is located on the site of the White Hall Dormitory, a male dormitory that stood from 1882 to 1967, the old Carnegie Library, and President Patterson's old house. Based on a photo printed in the Lexington Herald-Leader, December 1969 was the first time the university's Board Of Trustees met in the building. In July 2003, a bronze statue of Patterson was relocated to the front of the tower. A fountain was situated near the tower, but was removed in 1999.

On February 12, 2016, Australian philosopher David Chalmers visited the campus to give a talk entitled "Perception and Illusion in Virtual Reality" on the 18th floor of the tower. At the end of 2016, about 1,000 ping-pong balls were poured from the roof of the tower to celebrate the end of the semester. More than 100 students stood below, collecting as many balls as they could with plastic bags, open book bags, and umbrellas. In an article published on December 11, 2018, by the Herald-Leader, which includes $500 million facilities plan to renovate older buildings and construct new ones to accommodate planned enrollment growth over the next five years, the tower's 18th floor was mentioned under the heading "recommended capital project", and if repaired or replaced, would cost $4 million.

Patterson Office Tower was home to the Intermezzo Cafe from 1993 until 2022 when the University of Kentucky announced the location would be closed without a replacement. Previously, this location would serve breakfast and lunch.

== Features ==
Patterson Office Tower is a 20-story building with 18 floors. The building houses faculty offices and conference rooms, including many of the offices of the College of Arts and Sciences, the College of Social Work, Lewis Honors College, and the Dean of Students and Division of Student Affairs. It includes 6 elevators along with an office space that is designed for about 960 staff and academic personnel. The tower features a basement that connects the Big Blue Pantry and White Hall Classroom Building.

The 14th floor of the tower, which provides a space for international students to study and make connections with other students with similar interests, was recently renovated in 2018. The renovations of the floor helped create a new space for students interested in the International Studies Program. The area features a student lounge, a conference room, and office space.

== Incidents ==
In 2011, an overflowing urinal caused damage to three floors in the building after a faulty automatic flusher became stuck in the open position, causing flooding on the fourth floor. The water damaged the second, third, and fourth floors, saturating ceiling tiles and carpets, and some computers and documents. On May 31, 2013, a flasher was reported on the sixth floor of the building.

=== Protests ===
In 1970, Patterson Office Tower was the site of a protest in response to the Kent State shootings in Kent, Ohio. On April 1, 2011, students held a protest against racism near the tower. On March 27, 2013, the tower was one of the Fayette County locations for Take Back the Night protests. On April 1, 2014, students protested against privatization of dining services. On December 9, 2014, about 40 students held a die-in on the lobby floor to raise student awareness about the recent deaths of Eric Garner and Michael Brown. On November 9, 2016, students held a protest against Donald Trump after he was elected president on November 8.
