= James Kennedy Patterson =

British-American academic

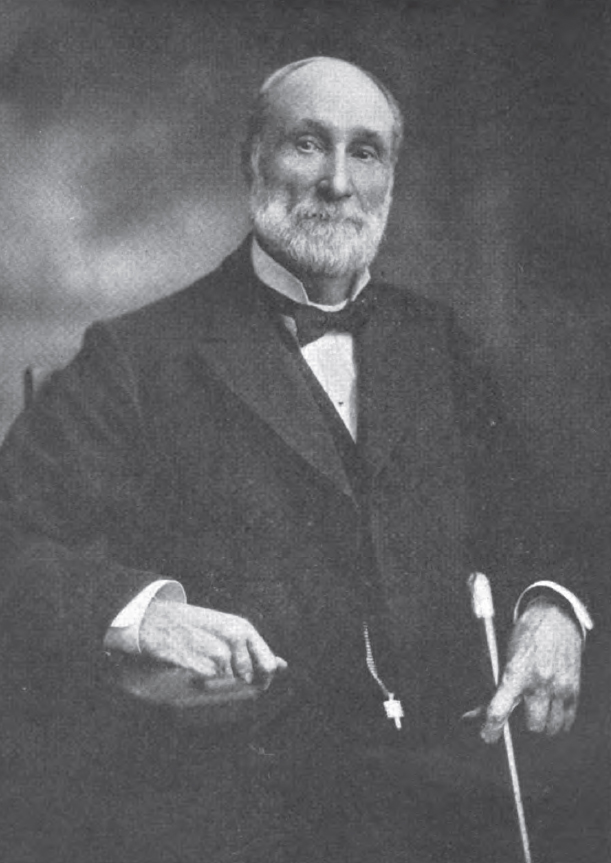

1st President of the University of Kentucky
- In office 1878–1910
- Preceded by: New office
- Succeeded by: Henry S. Barker

Personal details
- Born: March 26, 1833 Gorbals, Glasgow, Scotland
- Died: August 15, 1922 (aged 89)
- Spouse: Lucelia W. Wing
- Education: Hanover College
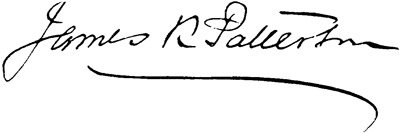
- Signature

James Kennedy Patterson (March 26, 1833 – August 15, 1922) was an academic who served as the first president of the University of Kentucky. His family immigrated from Scotland to Indiana in 1842 when he was nine years old. He pursued what meager educational opportunities were available in his new home, and eventually attended Hanover College, where he earned a Bachelor of Arts degree in 1856 and a Master of Arts degree in 1859. He briefly taught at Stewart College in Clarksville, Tennessee, but left the area when the Civil War forced the college to suspend operations. He became the principal at Transylvania Academy (part of what is now Transylvania University) in Lexington, Kentucky, in 1861. When Transylvania was merged with Kentucky University and the newly formed Kentucky Agricultural and Mechanical College in 1865, Patterson became a professor at the new institution, and was eventually given charge of the constituent Agricultural and Mechanical College.

Financial difficulties and denominational differences affected the separation of the Agricultural and Mechanical College from Kentucky University in 1878, and Patterson became the president of the independent Agricultural and Mechanical College. He lobbied the Kentucky General Assembly to pass a property tax to benefit the college in 1880, and successfully defended the tax against repeal in 1882 and against attacks on its constitutionality before the Kentucky Court of Appeals. Patterson continued to expand the resources and the curriculum of the college, and in 1908, he oversaw its transition to university status. At that time, the university was known as "State University: Lexington, Kentucky"; today it is the University of Kentucky. Patterson continued as president until his retirement in 1910.

During his career, Patterson was afforded many academic laurels. He was appointed as a delegate to the International Congress of Geographical Sciences in 1869 and to the British Association for the Advancement of Science in 1890. He was chosen as a fellow of the Royal Historical Society and the Society of Antiquaries of Scotland, and received numerous honorary degrees from various institutions of higher learning. Patterson died August 15, 1922. Patterson Hall, a dormitory at the University of Kentucky originally built for women but now coed, and the Patterson Office Tower, the university's administration building, are both named in his honor.

== Early life and family ==
James Kennedy Patterson was born in the Gorbals parish of Glasgow, Scotland on March 26, 1833. He was the eldest of five sons born to Andrew and Janet (Kennedy) Patterson, who were both from Presbyterian families associated with the Covenanter movement. All five brothers pursued careers as academics. Despite being the eldest, Patterson would outlive three of his brothers.

Patterson received an elementary education in Scotland. In 1842, when he was nine years old, Patterson's family immigrated to the United States, settling in Bartholomew County, Indiana, near the city of Madison. There were no school facilities in the area at the time, but Patterson continued his education by studying books from the private libraries of citizens in the area. In 1849, he was able to complete his elementary education at a school operated by Robert French in Madison. For a year, he taught in the common schools of Indiana before matriculating to Hanover College in May 1851. While there, he was associated with the Beta Theta Pi fraternity. Concurrent with his studies, he taught school in Henry County, Kentucky, from 1853 to 1855. Patterson earned a Bachelor of Arts degree in 1856, graduating at the top of his class. In 1859, he earned a Master of Arts degree at Hanover.

After graduation, Patterson became the principal of the Presbyterian Academy at Greenville, Kentucky, which was supervised by former U.S. Congressman Edward Rumsey. He remained in this position for three years. While in Greenville, he married Lucelia W. Wing, Congressman Rumsey's sister-in-law, on December 29, 1859. The couple had two children. Son William Alexander Patterson was born April 12, 1868. Daughter Jeanie Rumsey Patterson was born February 10, 1870, and died August 9 of the same year.

== Academic career ==
After their marriage, Patterson and his wife moved to Clarksville, Tennessee, where Patterson had been elected principal of the Preparatory Department at Stewart College in 1859. After a year, he became a professor of Greek and Latin at the school. At the outbreak of the Civil War, Stewart College suspended operations. Through the recommendation of a friend, Patterson was elected principal of Transylvania Academy in Lexington, Kentucky, in 1861. Although it was part of Transylvania College (now Transylvania University), the academy functioned as a high school during the war.

In 1865, the Kentucky General Assembly merged the college with Kentucky University in Harrodsburg and the newly chartered Kentucky Agricultural and Mechanical College. Following the merger, Patterson was appointed as a professor of Latin and Civil History and was given the chair of the department of History and Metaphysics. In 1869, he was given charge of the constituent Agricultural and Mechanical College. Governor Preston Leslie appointed him a delegate to the International Congress of Geographical Sciences which convened in Paris, France, later that year.

Patterson continued to study languages during his time as principal of the Agricultural and Mechanical College. Already familiar with Greek, Latin, and Hebrew, he developed a good knowledge of Sanskrit, Gothic, Anglo-Saxon, German, and French. Between 1871 and 1874, he was a frequent contributor of editorial content to local publications and newspapers, including a series of articles on tariffs and foreign policy which appeared in the Louisville Courier-Journal. In 1875, his alma mater, Hanover College, presented him with an honorary Doctor of Philosophy degree. During his later academic career, Patterson devoted more time to the study of history, metaphysics, and political science. In 1880, he was elected a fellow of both the British Royal Historical Society and the Society of Antiquaries of Scotland. In 1896, Lafayette College conferred upon him an honorary Doctor of Laws degree.

=== University of Kentucky ===
In 1878, denominational differences and financial difficulties led to the separation of the Agricultural and Mechanical College from Kentucky University. Upon separation, Patterson became the president of the independent college. Among his first tasks as president was attempting to improve the financial condition of the institution. To that end, he successfully lobbied the legislature to enact a property tax in the amount of one-half cent per one hundred dollars of taxable property to generate revenues for the college. The tax was approved in 1880. Opponents of the tax, led by the state's private denominational schools, attempted to get it repealed during the 1882 legislative session, but Patterson appeared before the legislature to defend it, and the General Assembly retained it. The tax was then challenged as unconstitutional by its opponents, but Patterson again successfully defended it before the Kentucky Court of Appeals.

Governor Simon Bolivar Buckner appointed Patterson a delegate to the British Association for the Advancement of Science in 1890. He was granted a year's leave from his duties as president, and set sail for Europe with his wife and son in June. The family visited England, Scotland, Belgium, France, Italy, Austria, Germany, and Switzerland before returning home in August 1891. On June 3, 1895, Patterson's son died during an appendectomy; and in his honor, Patterson built and endowed a library on campus. In his will, he also left an endowment for the college's School of Diplomacy in his son's name.

Even after the approval of the property tax, the college's funds remained inadequate to allow it to operate and expand. As president, Patterson gained a reputation as unduly frugal, particularly with regard to faculty salaries and facilities expansion. He personally lobbied the federal congress to pass the Hatch Act of 1887, which allowed land-grant colleges to receive federal land grants to construct agricultural experiment stations, and the Morrill Act of 1890, which provided for further endowment of land-grant colleges by the federal government. In 1900, he secured funding from the General Assembly for the construction of a gymnasium and a hall for female students, and in 1904, the General Assembly increased its annual contribution to the college's endowment by $15,000. When all other fundraising methods had been exhausted, Patterson resorted to securing a personal loan to cover the college's operating expenses.

In 1903, Patterson served as the president of the Association of Agricultural Colleges. As he continued to expand the curriculum of the college, he drew criticism from some of the state's citizens for moving the institution away from its roots as an agricultural and mechanical college and more toward becoming a liberal arts institution. In 1908, the General Assembly officially recognized the institution's transition to a university, and upon Patterson's recommendation, its name was changed to State University: Lexington, Kentucky. Today, it is known as the University of Kentucky.

Patterson continued as president for two years after the college was reclassified as a university; he retired in 1910. In his four decades as president, the institution grew from a single building – a private residence converted for academic use – to a 52 acres (0.21 km^{2}; 0.081 sq mi) campus consisting of 17 buildings and a 250 acres (1.0 km^{2}; 0.39 sq mi) farm. The institution's income had also risen from $9,900 annually when Patterson became president to $150,000 annually by the time of his retirement. As part of the terms of his retirement, he was allowed to continue attending board and faculty meetings, represent the university on the state and national level, and reside in the campus house built for the president. He was also allowed to serve as an advisor to the incoming president.

== Later life and death ==
Numerous honors were conferred on Patterson after his retirement. In 1910, the University of Vermont awarded him an honorary Doctor of Laws degree. He was elected to the National Geographic Society, the American Historical Association, and the American Academy of Political and Social Science. He was also a trustee for the American Civic Alliance. In 1911, he was invited to deliver the commencement address at Clemson Agricultural College (now Clemson University) and an address on "The Bible as a Factor in Modern Civilization" at his alma mater, Hanover College.

Patterson died August 15, 1922, and was buried in Lexington Cemetery. The women's dormitory constructed during his tenure, as well as the administration building and a local roadway, were named in his honor. In 1934, a statue of Patterson was erected near the university administration building.
