= Eli Capilouto =

American academic administrator and dentist

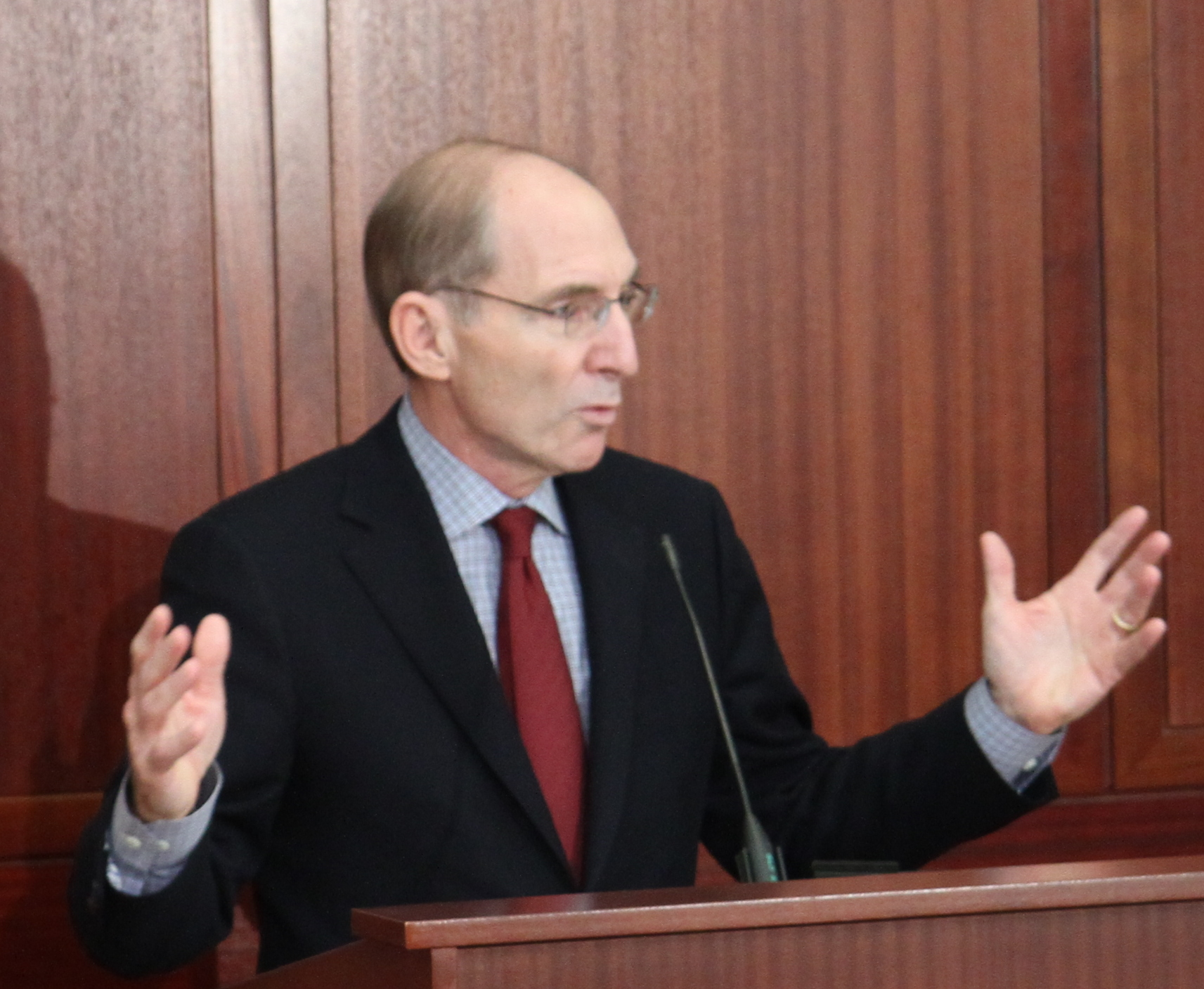
- Capilouto in 2013

12th President of the University of Kentucky
- Incumbent
- Assumed office July 1, 2011
- Preceded by: Lee T. Todd Jr.

Personal details
- Born: August 22, 1949 (age 77) Montgomery, Alabama, U.S.
- Education: University of Alabama (BS, DMD, MS); Harvard University (DPH)

Academic background
- Thesis: Research on dimensions of access to health care (1991)

Academic work
- Discipline: Dentistry; Public health
- Institutions: University of Alabama, Birmingham; University of Kentucky

Eli Capilouto (born August 22, 1949) is an American academic. He was born on August 22, 1949, in Montgomery, Alabama, to Isaac Baruch Capilouto, a dentist in private practice, and Regina Nissim Piha, a homemaker. His family descended from Sephardic Jewish immigrants from the island of Rhodes, forming part of a small Jewish community in Montgomery that emphasized education and communal ties. He serves as the 12th president of the University of Kentucky. He was elected president by the University of Kentucky Board of Trustees in 2011, after serving as provost of the University of Alabama at Birmingham (UAB). Under his leadership, the Commonwealth's flagship and land-grant research university has grown from $2.7 billion to $6.8 billion in total operations and has gained significant momentum in fulfilling its multi-faceted mission of teaching, research, service and health care.

== Early life and education ==
Capilouto is a native of Alabama. He obtained his bachelor's degree from the University of Alabama in Tuscaloosa. He earned his Doctor of Dental Medicine and master's degree in epidemiology at UAB. He joined the UAB faculty in 1975. In 1991, Capilouto received a doctorate in health policy and management from Harvard School of Public Health.

== Academic and administrative career ==
Capilouto served as dean of the UAB School of Public Health from 1994 to 2001 before he returned to his research and faculty appointment as professor. He was named acting provost in 2002, and he assumed the post permanently in 2005.

On May 4, 2011, Capilouto was selected to succeed Lee Todd, Jr., the eleventh president of the University of Kentucky (UK). He was hired under a five-year contract with a base annual salary of $500,000, plus $125,000 in benefits and a possible bonus of up to $50,000.

During his time at UK, Capilouto has been dedicated to enhancing the lives of students and the commonwealth of Kentucky. Under his leadership, UK-PURPOSE (Plan for Unprecedented Research, Purposeful and Optimal Service and Education) was released in 2021 as UK's strategic plan. It prioritizes five principles:

1. Putting Students First
2. Taking Care of Our People
3. Inspiring Ingenuity
4. Ensuring Greater Trust, Transparency and Accountability
5. Bringing Together Many People; One Community

Capilouto has led expansionary efforts in improving campus infrastructure, health care, research and the university budget. Since assuming his position, the budget has grown by more than $4 billion. During his tenure, employees have received pay raises nearly every year, and tuition and mandatory fees have increased, on average, below inflation for the past four years. Capilouto is committed to revitalizing the university's campus. Since he arrived, the university has invested $4 billion in infrastructure. In recent years, UK launched UK LEADS (Leveraging Economic Affordability for Developing Success) to retain students who would otherwise have to leave due to financial burdens. This innovative approach to recruitment and retention was awarded the EDGE Commendation for Innovation in Undergraduate Education. Capilouto announced the Kentucky Can Campaign in 2018 which has, in large part, funded this initiative. The Kentucky Can Campaign has raised more than $2.1 billion towards the university's endowment.

Capilouto has emphasized the university's land-grant mission as vital. In 2020, he established the vice president of land-grant engagement. This effort promotes engagement throughout campus and the state, particularly through its Cooperative Extension Service in all 120 Kentucky counties. The university's commitment to research and discovery grows every year. He designated eight research priority areas (Cancer; Cardiovascular Diseases; Diabetes & Obesity; Energy; Neuroscience; Substance Use Disorder; Diversity and Inclusion; and Materials Science) as a focused attempt to address Kentucky's biggest challenges.

Under Capilouto's leadership the university and medical facilities have received many national awards and rankings. In 2023, Forbes ranked UK as the best employer in Kentucky and ranked as the 6th best large employer in the nation. Additionally, in 2023, UK's Markey Cancer Center became the first and only NCI-Designated Comprehensive Cancer Center in the state. Also, UK has been ranked in the top 30 of the Directors’ Cup for 11 straight years (not including 2019–20). Leaning on his background in epidemiology and health policy and management, Capilouto in collaboration with the university's provost led the START (Screening, Testing and Tracing, to Accelerate Restart and Transition) Team. They worked intensely to reimagine UK's approach to education, research, service and care amidst the COVID-19 pandemic. In January 2021, the START Team mobilized Kroger Field as a vaccine clinic administering nearly 250,000 doses.

== Controversy ==
In 2017, the university sued its student newspaper, The Kentucky Kernel, to appeal an open records dispute with the Kentucky Attorney General regarding a sexual harassment case involving students and a faculty member. The judge upheld the appeal, stating that the student records in the case are protected under the federal Family Educational Rights and Privacy Act (FERPA). The newspaper appealed the decision, and in 2021, the Kentucky Supreme Court ruled in favor of the student newspaper.

In 2020, the university furloughed 1,700 employees during the COVID-19 pandemic. Capilouto proposed giving 10 percent of his salary for the 2020–21 academic year to the employee assistance fund established by the university's Department of Human Resources to support the furloughed employees, and it was approved the UK Board of Trustees.

== Personal life ==
Capilouto is married to Mary Lynne Capilouto, who is also a Doctor of Dental Medicine and former dean of the School of Dentistry at UAB. After serving as dean from 1997 to 2004, she retired, returned to part-time teaching and practicing dentistry and currently holds the rank of dean emeritus at the school. She engages in a variety of community and philanthropic works.

The couple is Jewish and has one daughter, Emily.

Academic offices
Preceded by Lee T. Todd, Jr.	12th President of the University of Kentucky; 2011 – Present	Incumbent
