= List of trauma centers in the United States =

This is a list of hospitals in the United States that are verified as trauma centers by the American College of Surgeons.

There are additional hospitals that are state-verified trauma centers- these can be found by searching each individual state.

Alabama Trauma Centers(current as of October 2026)

Alaska Trauma Centers (current as of March 2025)

Arizona Trauma Centers (current as of December 2025)

Arkansas Trauma Centers (current as of October 2026)

== List ==
1. The list below shows the hospital name, city and state location, number of beds in the hospital, ACS-verified adult trauma level certification, and ACS-verified pediatric trauma level certification:

Hospital	City	State	Beds	Adult Trauma Level	Pediatric Trauma Level
University of Alabama at Birmingham Hospital	Birmingham	Alabama	1295	I	
USA Health University Hospital	Mobile	Alabama		I	
Mat-Su Regional Medical Center	Palmer	Alaska		III	
Alaska Native Medical Center	Anchorage	Alaska	167	II	II
Providence Alaska Medical Center	Anchorage	Alaska	401	II	II
Abrazo West Campus	Goodyear	Arizona	179	II	
Banner University Medical Center Phoenix	Phoenix	Arizona	712	I	
Banner University Medical Center South	Tucson	Arizona		III	
Banner University Medical Center Tucson	Tucson	Arizona	479	I	II
Banner Baywood Medical Center	Mesa	Arizona	340	III	
Banner Del E Webb Medical Center	Sun City West	Arizona	394	III	
Banner Desert Medical Center	Mesa	Arizona	615	II	II
Banner Thunderbird Medical Center	Glendale	Arizona	555	II	
Carondelet St. Joseph's Hospital	Tucson	Arizona	449	II	
Chandler Regional Medical Center	Chandler	Arizona	338	I	
Flagstaff Medical Center	Flagstaff	Arizona	270	II	
Havasu Regional Medical Center	Lake Havasu City	Arizona	163	III	
HonorHealth Deer Valley Medical Center	Phoenix	Arizona	204	II	
HonorHealth John C. Lincoln Medical Center	Phoenix	Arizona	262	I	
HonorHealth Scottsdale Osborn Medical Center	Scottsdale	Arizona	341	I	
Mountain Vista Medical Center	Phoenix	Arizona	162	III	
Phoenix Children's Hospital	Phoenix	Arizona	433		I
St. Joseph's Hospital and Medical Center	Phoenix	Arizona	607	I	
Tuba City Regional Health Care Corporation	Tuba City	Arizona	73	III	
Valleywise Health Medical Center	Phoenix	Arizona	449	I	
Arkansas Children's Hospital	Little Rock	Arkansas	336		I
UAMS Medical Center	Little Rock	Arkansas	434	I	
Adventist Rideout Health	Marysville	California	219	III	
Antelope Valley Hospital	Lancaster	California	420	II	
Arrowhead Regional Medical Center	Colton	California	456	I	
Barton Memorial Hospital	South Lake Tahoe	California	111	III	
California Hospital Medical Center	Los Angeles	California	318	II	
Cedars-Sinai Medical Center	Los Angeles	California	886	I	
Children's Hospital Los Angeles	Los Angeles	California	391		I
Children's Hospital of Orange County	Orange	California	316		I
Community Regional Medical Center	Fresno	California	685	I	
Desert Regional Medical Center	Palm Springs	California	385	I	
Doctors Medical Center of Modesto	Modesto	California		II	
Eden Medical Center	Castro Valley	California		II	
Enloe Medical Center	Chico	California	298	II	
Harbor-UCLA Medical Center	Torrance	California	570	I	
Henry Mayo Newhall Memorial Hospital	Valencia	California	238	II	
Highland Hospital	Oakland	California	236	I	
Huntington Hospital	Pasadena	California	619	II	
John Muir Medical Center	Walnut Creek	California	554	II	
Kaiser Permanente Vacaville Medical Center	Vacaville	California	420	II	
Kaiser Permanente South Sacramento	Sacramento	California	209	II	
Kaweah Delta Medical Center	Visalia	California	581	III	
Kern Medical Center	Bakersfield	California		II	
LA + USC Medical Center	Los Angeles	California	600	I	
Loma Linda University Medical Center	Loma Linda	California	507	I	I
Los Robles Hospital & Medical Center	Thousand Oaks	California	382	II	
Marian Regional Medical Center	Santa Maria	California	388	II	
MarinHealth Medical Center	Greenbrae	California	235	III	
Marshall Medical Center	Placerville	California	124	III	
Memorial Medical Center	Modesto	California	423	II	
Mercy Medical Center	Mount Shasta	California	25	III	
Mercy Medical Center	Redding	California	375	II	
Mercy San Juan Medical Center	Carmichael	California	370	II	
Mission Hospital Regional Medical Center	Mission Viejo	California	523	II	II
Natividad Medical Center	Salinas	California	172	II	
North Bay Medical Center	Fairfield	California	182	II	
Northridge Hospital Medical Center	Northridge	California	425	II	II
Orange County Global Medical Center	Santa Ana	California	228	II	
Palomar Medical Center	Escondido	California	332	II	
Providence Holy Cross Medical Center	Mission Hills	California	377	II	
Queen of the Valley Medical Center	Napa	California	208	III	
Rady Children's Hospital	San Diego	California	524		I
Regional Medical Center	San Jose	California	258	II	
Riverside Community Hospital	Riverside	California	478	I	
Riverside University Health System Medical Center	Moreno Valley	California	439	I	II
Ronald Reagan UCLA Medical Center/Mattel Children's	Los Angeles	California	520	I	I
Saint Elizabeth Community Hospital	Red Bluff	California	76	III	
San Joaquin General Hospital	French Camp	California	196	II	
Santa Barbara Cottage Hospital	Santa Barbara	California	519	I	II
Santa Clara Valley Medical Center	San Jose	California	731	I	II
Santa Rosa Memorial Hospital	Santa Rosa	California	338	II	
Scripps Memorial Hospital	La Jolla	California	357	I	
Scripps Mercy Hospital	San Diego	California	684	I	
Sharp Memorial Hospital	San Diego	California	394	II	
Sierra Vista Regional Medical Center	San Luis Obispo	California	164	III	
St. Francis Medical Center	Lynwood	California	369	II	
St. Mary Medical Center	Long Beach	California	415	II	
Stanford Health Care/Lucile Packard Children's Hospital	Stanford	California	361	I	I
Sutter Health Eden Medical Center	Castro Valley	California	130	II	
Sutter Roseville Medical Center	Roseville	California	328	II	
Tahoe Forest Hospital	Truckee	California	62	III	
UC Davis Medical Center	Sacramento	California	625	I	I
UC Irvine Health	Orange	California	411	I	II
UC San Diego Medical Center	San Diego	California	390	I	
UCSF Benioff Children's Hospital	Oakland	California	183		I
Valley Children's Hospital	Madera	California	358		II
Ventura County Medical Center	Ventura	California	208	II	
Zuckerberg San Francisco General Hospital and Trauma Center	San Francisco	California	397	I	
Children's Hospital Colorado	Aurora	Colorado	434		I
Denver Health Medical Center	Denver	Colorado	453	I	II
Good Samaritan Medical Center	Lafayette	Colorado	183	II	
AdventHealth Littleton	Littleton	Colorado	176	II	
Medical Center of the Rockies	Loveland	Colorado	166	II	
Memorial Hospital Central	Colorado Springs	Colorado	413	I	
AdventHealth Parker	Parker	Colorado	165	II	
Penrose Hospital	Colorado Springs	Colorado	522	I	
Poudre Valley Hospital	Fort Collins	Colorado	270	III	
Sky Ridge Medical Center	Lone Tree	Colorado	272	II	
St. Anthony Hospital	Lakewood	Colorado	237	I	
St. Mary's Hospital	Grand Junction	Colorado	310	II	
Swedish Medical Center	Englewood	Colorado	408	I	
The Medical Center of Aurora	Aurora	Colorado	346	II	
UCHealth Parkview Medical Center	Pueblo	Colorado	266	III	
University of Colorado Hospital	Aurora	Colorado	678	I	
Bridgeport Hospital	Bridgeport	Connecticut	501	II	
Connecticut Children's Medical Center	Hartford	Connecticut	185		I
Danbury Hospital	Danbury	Connecticut	371	II	
Hartford Hospital	Hartford	Connecticut	867	I	
Norwalk Hospital	Norwalk	Connecticut	328	II	
Saint Francis Hospital & Medical Center	Hartford	Connecticut	617	I	
Saint Mary's Hospital	Waterbury	Connecticut	347	II	
St. Vincent's Medical Center	Bridgeport	Connecticut	473	II	
Stamford Hospital	Stamford	Connecticut	305	II	
The Hospital of Central Connecticut	New Britain	Connecticut	446	III	
Waterbury Hospital	Waterbury	Connecticut	357	II	
William W. Backus Hospital	Norwich	Connecticut		III	
Yale-New Haven Hospital	New Haven	Connecticut	1541	I	I
Bayhealth Hospital, Kent Campus	Dover	Delaware		III	
Bayhealth Hospital, Sussex Campus	Milford	Delaware		III	
Beebe Medical Center	Lewes	Delaware		III	
Christiana Hospital	Newark	Delaware	907	I	
Nanticoke Memorial Hospital	Seaford	Delaware		III	
Nemours Children's Hospital, Delaware	Wilmington	Delaware	158		I
Saint Francis Healthcare	Wilmington	Delaware		III	
Wilmington Hospital	Wilmington	Delaware		III	
Children's National Medical Center	Washington	District of Columbia	303		I
George Washington University Hospital	Washington	District of Columbia	371	I	
Howard University Hospital	Washington	District of Columbia	300	I	
MedStar Washington Hospital Center	Washington	District of Columbia	926	I	
Fort Walton Beach Medical Center	Fort Walton Beach	Florida		II	
Holmes Regional Medical Center	Melbourne	Florida		II	II
Jackson Memorial Hospital	Miami	Florida	1550	I	
HCA Florida Bayonet Point Hospital	Hudson	Florida	392	II	
HCA Kendall Regional Medical Center	Miami	Florida	417	I	
Lakeland Regional Medical Center	Lakeland	Florida	864	II	
Lawnwood Regional Medical Center	Fort Pierce	Florida		II	
Memorial Regional Hospital	Hollywood	Florida	1013	I	II
Nemours Children's Hospital, Florida	Orlando	Florida	130		II
Nicklaus Children's Hospital	Miami	Florida	289		I
Ocala Regional Medical Center	Ocala	Florida	474	II	
Osceola Regional Medical Center	Kissimmee	Florida	404	II	
Orlando Regional Medical Center	Orlando	Florida	808	I	I
St. Joseph's Hospital	Tampa	Florida	615	II	
St. Joseph's Children's Hospital	Tampa	Florida	219		II
Tampa General Hospital	Tampa	Florida	1010	I	I
UF Health Jacksonville	Jacksonville	Florida	695	I	
UF Health Shands Hospital	Gainesville	Florida	966	I	
Wolfson Children’s Hospital	Jacksonville	Florida	276		I
Augusta University Medical Center	Augusta	Georgia	478	I	II
Children's Healthcare of Atlanta - Egleston Hospital	Atlanta	Georgia	235		I
Doctors Hospital of Augusta	Augusta	Georgia		II	
Grady Memorial Hospital	Atlanta	Georgia	961	I	
Medical Center of Central Georgia	Macon	Georgia	637	I	
Northeast Georgia Medical Center	Gainesville	Georgia	615	I	
Piedmont Athens Regional	Athens	Georgia	427	II	
Wellstar Kennestone Medical Center	Marietta	Georgia	633	I	
Wellstar North Fulton Hospital	Roswell	Georgia	218	II	
Pali Momi Medical Center	Aiea	Hawaii		III	
Kapiʻolani Medical Center for Women and Children	Honolulu	Hawaii	207		III
The Queen's Medical Center	Honolulu	Hawaii	575	I	
Tripler Army Medical Center	Honolulu	Hawaii		II	
Wilcox Memorial Hospital	Lihue	Hawaii		III	
Saint Alphonsus Regional Medical Center	Boise	Idaho		II	
St. Luke's Boise Medical Center	Boise	Idaho	437		II
Eastern Idaho Regional Medical Center	Idaho Falls	Idaho		II	
Kootenai Medical Center	Coeur d'Alene	Idaho		II	
Portneuf Medical Center	Pocatello	Idaho		II	
Advocate Good Samaritan Hospital	Downers Grove	Illinois	333	I	
Advocate Christ Medical Center	Oak Lawn	Illinois	768	I	
Carle Foundation Hospital	Urbana	Illinois	433	I	
OSF HealthCare Children's Hospital of Illinois	Peoria	Illinois	144		I
Loyola University Medical Center	Maywood	Illinois	547	I	
John H. Stroger Jr. Hospital of Cook County/Cook County Hospital	Chicago	Illinois	464	I	I
Ann & Robert H. Lurie Children's Hospital of Chicago	Chicago	Illinois			I
Northwestern Memorial Hospital	Chicago	Illinois	894	I	
OSF HealthCare Saint Anthony Medical Center	Rockford	Illinois	254	I	
OSF HealthCare Saint Francis Medical Center	Peoria	Illinois	649	I	
Silver Cross Hospital	New Lenox	Illinois	348	II	
University of Chicago Medicine	Chicago	Illinois	811	I	I
Arnett Hospital	Lafayette	Indiana		III	
Ball Memorial Hospital	Muncie	Indiana		III	
Bloomington Hospital	Bloomington	Indiana		III	
Community Hospital of Anderson and Madison County	Anderson	Indiana		III	
Deaconess Hospital	Evansville	Indiana		II	
Elkhart General Hospital	Elkhart	Indiana		III	
Eskenazi Hospital	Indianapolis	Indiana	315	I	
Franciscan Health Crown Point	Crown Point	Indiana		III	
Franciscan Health Indianapolis	Indianapolis	Indiana		III	
Franciscan Health Lafayette	Lafayette	Indiana		III	
Good Samaritan Hospital	Vincennes	Indiana		III	
Indiana University Health Methodist Hospital	Indianapolis	Indiana	802	I	
Lutheran Hospital of Indiana	Fort Wayne	Indiana		II	II
Memorial Hospital and Health Care Center	Jasper	Indiana		III	
Memorial Hospital of South Bend	South Bend	Indiana		II	
Methodist Hospitals Northlake Campus	Gary	Indiana		III	
Parkview Regional Medical Center	Fort Wayne	Indiana		II	II
Reid Hospital and Health Care Services	Richmond	Indiana		III	
Riley Hospital for Children	Indianapolis	Indiana	379		I
St. Vincent Anderson Regional Hospital	Anderson	Indiana		III	
St. Vincent Evansville	Evansville	Indiana		II	II
St. Vincent Indianapolis Hospital	Indianapolis	Indiana	840	I	I
Terre Haute Regional Hospital	Terre Haute	Indiana		II	
Union Hospital	Terre Haute	Indiana		III	
Iowa Methodist Medical Center	Des Moines	Iowa	370	I	II
MercyOne Des Moines Medical Center	Des Moines	Iowa	875	II	II
MercyOne Siouxland Medical Center	Sioux City	Iowa		II	
University of Iowa Hospitals and Clinics	Iowa City	Iowa	811	I	
University of Iowa Children's Hospital	Iowa City	Iowa	190		I
Ascension Via Christi Hospital in Pittsburg	Pittsburg	Kansas		III	
Ascension Via Christi St. Francis	Wichita	Kansas	650	I	
Hays Medical Center	Hays	Kansas		III	
Hutchinson Regional Medical Center	Hutchinson	Kansas		III	
Labette Health	Parsons	Kansas		III	
Overland Park Regional Medical Center	Overland Park	Kansas	343	II	
Salina Regional Health Center	Salina	Kansas		III	
Stormont Vail Health	Topeka	Kansas		II	
University of Kansas Hospital	Kansas City	Kansas	892	I	
Wesley Medical Center	Wichita	Kansas	760	I	II
Albert B. Chandler Hospital	Lexington	Kentucky	962	I	I
Ephraim McDowell Regional Medical Center	Danville	Kentucky		III	
Frankfort Regional Medical Center	Frankfort	Kentucky		III	
Norton Children's Hospital	Louisville	Kentucky	279		I
Owensboro Health Regional Hospital	Owensboro	Kentucky		III	
Pikeville Medical Center	Pikeville	Kentucky		II	
University of Louisville Hospital	Louisville	Kentucky	348	I	
Children's Hospital New Orleans	New Orleans	Louisiana	263		I
Lafayette General Medical Center	Lafayette	Louisiana		II	
Lakeview Regional Medical Center	Covington	Louisiana		III	
North Oaks Medical Center	Hammond	Louisiana		II	
Ochsner LSU Health Shreveport	Shreveport	Louisiana	452	I	
Our Lady of the Lake Regional Medical Center	Baton Rouge	Louisiana	1020	I	II
Rapides Regional Medical Center	Alexandria	Louisiana		II	
St. Tammany Parish Hospital	Covington	Louisiana		III	
University Medical Center New Orleans	New Orleans	Louisiana	446	I	
Central Maine Medical Center	Lewiston	Maine		II	
Northern Light Eastern Maine Medical Center	Bangor	Maine		II	
Maine Medical Center	Portland	Maine	637	I	
Walter Reed National Military Medical Center	Bethesda	Maryland	244	II	
Suburban Hospital	Bethesda	Maryland	230	II	
R Adams Cowley Shock Trauma Center	Baltimore	Maryland	100	I+/PARC	
Johns Hopkins Hospital	Baltimore	Maryland	1091	I	I
Johns Hopkins Bayview Medical Center	Baltimore	Maryland	420	I	
Anna Jaques Hospital	Newburyport	Massachusetts		III	
Baystate Medical Center	Springfield	Massachusetts	716	I	II
Berkshire Medical Center	Pittsfield	Massachusetts		III	
Beth Israel Deaconess Medical Center	Boston	Massachusetts	673	I	
Beverly Hospital	Beverly	Massachusetts		III	
Boston Children's Hospital	Boston	Massachusetts	404		I
Boston Medical Center	Boston	Massachusetts	514	I	II
Brigham and Women's Hospital	Boston	Massachusetts	793	I	
Good Samaritan Medical Center	Brockton	Massachusetts		III	
Lahey Hospital & Medical Center	Burlington	Massachusetts	335	I	
Lawrence General Hospital	Lawrence	Massachusetts		III	
Lowell General Hospital	Lowell	Massachusetts		III	
Massachusetts General Hospital	Boston	Massachusetts	999	I	I
Salem Hospital	Salem	Massachusetts		III	
South Shore Hospital	Weymouth	Massachusetts		II	
St. Luke's Hospital	New Bedford	Massachusetts		II	
Tufts Medical Center	Boston	Massachusetts	415	I	I
UMass Memorial Medical Center	Worcester	Massachusetts	781	I	I
Ascension Borgess Hospital	Kalamazoo	Michigan		II	
Ascension Genesys Hospital	Grand Blanc	Michigan		II	
Ascension Macomb-Oakland Hospital, Warren Campus	Warren	Michigan		III	
Ascension Providence Hospital, Novi Campus	Novi	Michigan		II	
Ascension Providence Hospital, Southfield Campus	Southfield	Michigan		II	
Ascension Providence Rochester Hospital	Rochester	Michigan		III	
Ascension St. John Hospital	Detroit	Michigan	612	I	II
Ascension St. Mary's Hospital	Saginaw	Michigan		II	
Beaumont Hospital, Dearborn	Dearborn	Michigan		II	
Beaumont Hospital, Farmington Hills	Farmington Hills	Michigan		II	
Beaumont Hospital, Grosse Pointe	Grosse Pointe	Michigan		III	
Beaumont Hospital, Royal Oak	Royal Oak	Michigan	1109	I	II
Beaumont Hospital, Trenton	Trenton	Michigan		II	
Beaumont Hospital, Wayne	Wayne	Michigan		III	
Bronson Methodist Hospital	Kalamazoo	Michigan	405	I	
Butterworth Hospital	Grand Rapids	Michigan	1387	I	I
Children's Hospital of Michigan	Detroit	Michigan	727		I
Covenant Medical Center	Saginaw	Michigan		II	II
C.S. Mott Children's Hospital	Ann Arbor	Michigan	348		I
Detroit Receiving Hospital	Detroit	Michigan	273	I	
Henry Ford Allegiance Health	Jackson	Michigan	475	II	
Henry Ford Hospital	Detroit	Michigan	877	I	
Henry Ford Macomb Hospital	Clinton Township	Michigan	361	II	
Henry Ford West Bloomfield Hospital	West Bloomfield	Michigan	191	III	
Henry Ford Wyandotte Hospital	Wyandotte	Michigan	401	III	
Hurley Medical Center	Flint	Michigan	443	I	II
Lakeland Medical Center	St. Joseph	Michigan		III	
McLaren Flint	Flint	Michigan		III	
McLaren Lapeer Region	Lapeer	Michigan		II	
McLaren Macomb	Mt. Clemens	Michigan		II	
McLaren Northern Michigan	Petoskey	Michigan	202	II	
McLaren Oakland	Pontiac	Michigan		II	
McLaren Port Huron	Port Huron	Michigan		III	
Mercy Health Hackley Campus	Muskegon	Michigan		II	
Mercy Health Saint Mary's	Grand Rapids	Michigan		II	
Metro Health Hospital	Wyoming	Michigan	208	II	
MidMichigan Medical Center-Midland	Midland	Michigan	324	II	
Munson Medical Center	Traverse City	Michigan	442	II	
Sinai-Grace Hospital	Detroit	Michigan		II	
Sparrow Hospital	Lansing	Michigan	733	I	
St. Joseph Mercy Ann Arbor	Ann Arbor	Michigan	537	I	
St. Joseph Mercy Oakland	Pontiac	Michigan	443	II	
St. Mary Mercy Livonia	Livonia	Michigan	304	II	
University of Michigan Hospital	Ann Arbor	Michigan	550	I	
UP Health System - Marquette	Marquette	Michigan	307	II	
UP Health System - Portage	Hancock	Michigan		III	
Children’s Minnesota	Minneapolis	Minnesota	381		I
Hennepin County Medical Center	Minneapolis	Minnesota	484	I	I
Mayo Clinic Health System - Mankato	Mankato	Minnesota		III	
Mayo Clinic Hospital, Saint Marys Campus	Rochester	Minnesota	1265	I	I
Mercy Hospital	Coon Rapids	Minnesota		II	
North Memorial Health Hospital	Robbinsdale	Minnesota	353	I	II
Regions Hospital	St. Paul	Minnesota	509	I	I
St. Cloud Hospital	St. Cloud	Minnesota		II	
St. Lukes Hospital	Duluth	Minnesota		II	
St. Mary's Medical Center	Duluth	Minnesota	308	I	II
University of Minnesota Medical Center	Minneapolis	Minnesota		II	
University of Mississippi Medical Center	Jackson	Mississippi	722	I	III
Barnes-Jewish Hospital	St. Louis	Missouri	1266	I	
Children's Mercy Hospital	Kansas City	Missouri	367		I
Research Medical Center	Kansas City	Missouri	590	I	
Saint Louis University Hospital	St. Louis	Missouri	356	I	
St. Louis Children's Hospital	St. Louis	Missouri	402		I
University Health Truman Medical Center	Kansas City	Missouri	238	I	
University Hospital	Columbia	Missouri	247	I	
CoxHealth	Springfield	Missouri	247	I	
Benefis Health System	Great Falls	Montana		II	
Billings Clinic	Billings	Montana	336	I	
Bozeman Health Deaconess Hospital	Bozeman	Montana		III	
Kalispell Regional Medical Center	Kalispell	Montana		III	
St. James Healthcare	Butte	Montana		III	
St. Patrick Hospital	Missoula	Montana		II	
St. Vincent Healthcare	Billings	Montana		II	
Bryan Medical Center West Campus	Lincoln	Nebraska		II	
Creighton University Medical Center	Omaha	Nebraska	391	I	
CHI Health St. Francis	Grand Island	Nebraska		III	
Children's Hospital & Medical Center	Omaha	Nebraska			II
Nebraska Medical Center	Omaha	Nebraska	718	I	
Renown Regional Medical Center	Reno	Nevada		II	
St. Rose Dominican Hospital - Siena Campus	Henderson	Nevada		III	
MountainView Hospital	Las Vegas	Nevada	425	III	
Sunrise Hospital and Medical Center	Las Vegas	Nevada		II	
University Medical Center of Southern Nevada	Las Vegas	Nevada	564	I	II
Catholic Medical Center	Manchester	New Hampshire	330	III	
Concord Hospital	Concord	New Hampshire	295	II	
Dartmouth-Hitchcock Medical Center	Lebanon	New Hampshire	396	I	II
Elliot Hospital	Manchester	New Hampshire	296	II	
Portsmouth Regional Hospital	Portsmouth	New Hampshire	220	II	
AtlantiCare Regional Medical Center	Atlantic City	New Jersey		II	
Capital Health Regional Medical Center	Trenton	New Jersey		II	
Cooper University Hospital	Camden	New Jersey	635	I	II
Hackensack University Medical Center	Hackensack	New Jersey	781	I	I
Jersey City Medical Center	Jersey City	New Jersey		II	
Jersey Shore University Medical Center	Neptune	New Jersey		I	II
Morristown Medical Center	Morristown	New Jersey	518	I	
Robert Wood Johnson University Hospital	New Brunswick	New Jersey	965	I	I
St. Joseph's Regional Medical Center	Paterson	New Jersey		II	
University Hospital	Newark	New Jersey	518	I	
University of New Mexico Hospital	Albuquerque	New Mexico	556	I	
CHRISTUS St. Vincent Regional Medical Center	Santa Fe	New Mexico	200	III	
Albany Medical Center	Albany	New York	734	I	I
Brookdale University Hospital and Medical Center	New York City	New York		II	
BronxCare Hospital System	Bronx	New York		II	
Cohen Children's Medical Center	New Hyde Park	New York	202		I
Erie County Medical Center	Buffalo	New York	550	I	
Good Samaritan Hospital Medical Center	West Islip	New York		II	II
Huntington Hospital	Huntington	New York		III	
Jamaica Hospital Medical Center	New York City	New York	402	I	
Golisano Children's Hospital of Buffalo	Buffalo	New York	185		I
Long Island Community Hospital	Patchogue	New York		III	
MidHudson Regional Hospital	Poughkeepsie	New York		II	
Montefiore Nyack Hospital	Nyack	New York	391	III	
NewYork-Presbyterian Children's Hospital of New York - Morgan Stanley	New York City	New York	299		I
Mount Sinai St. Luke's	New York City	New York		II	
Nassau University Medical Center	East Meadow	New York	631	I	
NewYork-Presbyterian Queens	New York City (Flushing, Queens)	New York	535	I	
North Shore University Hospital	Manhasset	New York	738	I	
NYC Health + Hospitals/Bellevue	New York City	New York	844	I	II
NYC Health + Hospitals/Elmhurst	New York City	New York	545	I	
NYC Health + Hospitals/Harlem	New York City	New York	272	II	
NYC Health + Hospitals/Jacobi	New York City	New York	457	I	II
NYC Health + Hospitals/Kings County	New York City	New York	639	I	
NYC Health + Hospitals/Lincoln	New York City	New York	362	I	
NYU Langone Hospital – Brooklyn	New York City	New York	450	I	
NYU Langone Hospital — Long Island	Mineola	New York	591	I	
Orange Regional Medical Center	Middletown	New York		II	
Richmond University Medical Center	New York City	New York	448	I	II
St. Barnabas Hospital	New York City	New York		II	
St. Elizabeth Medical Center	Utica	New York		III	
St. Luke's Cornwall Hospital	Newburgh	New York		III	
South Nassau Communities Hospital	Oceanside	New York		II	
Southside Hospital	Bay Shore	New York		II	
Staten Island University Hospital	New York City	New York	668	I	II
Stony Brook University Hospital	Stony Brook	New York	603	I	I
Stony Brook Southampton Hospital	Southampton	New York	150	III	
Strong Memorial Hospital	Rochester	New York	886	I	
UHS Wilson Medical Center	Johnson City	New York		II	
Upstate University Hospital	Syracuse	New York	438	I	I
Vassar Brothers Medical Center	Poughkeepsie	New York		II	
Weill Cornell Medical Center	New York City	New York	892	I	II
Westchester Medical Center	Valhalla	New York	652	I	I
Atrium Health's Carolinas Medical Center	Charlotte	North Carolina	874	I	I
Duke University Hospital	Durham	North Carolina	957	I	
Moses Cone Hospital	Greensboro	North Carolina	517	II	
Naval Medical Center Camp Lejeune	Camp Lejeune	North Carolina		III	
ECU Health Medical Center	Greenville	North Carolina	974	I	I
Mission Hospital	Asheville	North Carolina		I	
Novant Health New Hanover Regional Medical Center	Wilmington	North Carolina		II	
Novant Health Presbyterian Medical Center	Charlotte	North Carolina		II	
Wake Forest Baptist Medical Center	Winston-Salem	North Carolina	885	I	I
UNC Hospitals	Chapel Hill	North Carolina	932	I	I
WakeMed Raleigh Campus	Raleigh	North Carolina	694	I	
Womack Army Medical Center	Fort Bragg	North Carolina		III	
Altru Hospital	Grand Forks	North Dakota	257	II	II
CHI St. Alexius Health Bismarck	Bismarck	North Dakota	306	II	III
Essentia Health-Fargo	Fargo	North Dakota	133	II	
Sanford Medical Center - Bismarck	Bismarck	North Dakota	243	II	
Sanford Medical Center Fargo	Fargo	North Dakota	284	I	II
Trinity Hospital	Minot	North Dakota	251	II	
Akron Children's Hospital	Akron	Ohio	289		I
Atrium Medical Center	Middletown	Ohio		III	
Aultman Hospital	Canton	Ohio		II	
Bethesda North Hospital	Montgomery	Ohio		III	
Blanchard Valley Hospital	Findlay	Ohio		III	
Cincinnati Children's Hospital	Cincinnati	Ohio	634		I
Cleveland Clinic Akron General	Akron	Ohio	436	I	
Cleveland Clinic	Cleveland	Ohio	1299	II	
Dayton Children's Hospital	Dayton	Ohio			I
Fairview Hospital	Cleveland	Ohio		II	
Firelands Regional Medical Center	Sandusky	Ohio		III	
Fisher-Titus Medical Center	Norwalk	Ohio		III	
Geauga Medical Center	Chardon	Ohio		III	
Genesis HealthCare System	Zanesville	Ohio		III	
Kettering Health Dayton	Dayton	Ohio		III	
Grant Medical Center	Columbus	Ohio	434	I	
Kettering Health Greene Memorial	Xenia	Ohio		III	
Hillcrest Hospital	Mayfield Heights	Ohio		II	
Kettering Health Main Campus	Kettering	Ohio		II	
Lima Memorial Health System	Lima	Ohio		II	
Marietta Memorial Hospital	Marietta	Ohio		III	
Mercy Health - St. Vincent Medical Center	Toledo	Ohio	313	I	II
Mercy Medical Center	Canton	Ohio		II	
Mercy Health St. Charles Hospital	Oregon	Ohio	235	III	
MetroHealth Medical Center	Cleveland	Ohio	731	I	II
Premier Health Miami Valley Hospital	Dayton	Ohio	848	I	
Mount Carmel East	Columbus	Ohio		II	
Nationwide Children's Hospital	Columbus	Ohio	673		I
Ohio State University Wexner Medical Center	Columbus	Ohio	1404	I	
Mansfield Hospital	Mansfield	Ohio		II	
ProMedica Defiance Regional Hospital	Defiance	Ohio		III	
ProMedica Toledo Hospital	Toledo	Ohio	794	I	II
Rainbow Babies & Children's Hospital	Cleveland	Ohio	244		I
Riverside Methodist Hospital	Columbus	Ohio		II	
Southwest General Health Center	Middleburg Heights	Ohio		III	
Mercy Health St. Elizabeth Youngstown Hospital	Youngstown	Ohio	364	I	
University Hospitals Cleveland Medical Center	Cleveland	Ohio	1032	I	
St. John Medical Center	Westlake	Ohio		III	
Mercy Health St. Joseph Warren Hospital	Warren	Ohio	137	III	
Mercy Health St. Rita's Medical Center	Lima	Ohio	378	II	
Summa Akron City Hospital	Akron	Ohio	680	I	
Trumbull Regional Medical Center	Warren	Ohio	346	III	
University of Toledo Medical Center	Toledo	Ohio		III	
Portage Medical Center	Ravenna	Ohio		III	
University of Cincinnati Medical Center	Cincinnati	Ohio	555	I	
West Chester Hospital	West Chester	Ohio		III	
OU Health University of Oklahoma Medical Center	Oklahoma City	Oklahoma	944	I	I
OU Health Oklahoma Children's Hospital	Oklahoma City	Oklahoma			I
Integris Baptist Medical Center	Oklahoma City	Oklahoma		II	
Integris Southwest Medical Center	Oklahoma City	Oklahoma		III	
Mercy Hospital	Oklahoma City	Oklahoma		III	
St. Anthony Hospital	Oklahoma City	Oklahoma		III	
Ascension St. John Medical Center	Tulsa	Oklahoma	677	I	
Saint Francis Hospital	Tulsa	Oklahoma	1,112	I	
Legacy Emanuel Medical Center	Portland	Oregon	554	I	I
Oregon Health & Science University Hospital	Portland	Oregon	576	I	I
Sacred Heart Medical Center at RiverBend	Springfield	Oregon		II	
Allegheny General Hospital	Pittsburgh	Pennsylvania	576	I	
Children's Hospital of Philadelphia	Philadelphia	Pennsylvania	596		I
Conemaugh Memorial Medical Center	Johnstown	Pennsylvania	537	I	
Crozer-Chester Medical Center	Upland	Pennsylvania	424	II	
Einstein Medical Center Philadelphia	Philadelphia	Pennsylvania	701	I	
Forbes Regional Hospital	Monroeville	Pennsylvania	291		II
Geisinger Medical Center	Danville	Pennsylvania	594	I	II
Geisinger Community Medical Center	Scranton	Pennsylvania	297	II	
Geisinger Wyoming Valley Medical Center	Wilkes-Barre	Pennsylvania	320	II	
Guthrie Robert Packer Hospital	Sayre	Pennsylvania	254	II	
Jefferson Abington Hospital	Abington	Pennsylvania	665	II	
Jefferson Torresdale Hospital	Philadelphia	Pennsylvania	258	II	
Lancaster General Hospital	Lancaster	Pennsylvania	631	I	
Lehigh Valley Hospital–Cedar Crest	Allentown	Pennsylvania	981	I	II
Penn Presbyterian Medical Center	Philadelphia	Pennsylvania	300	I	
Penn State Milton S. Hershey Medical Center	Hershey	Pennsylvania	548	I	I
Reading Hospital	Reading	Pennsylvania	738	I	
St. Christopher's Hospital for Children	Philadelphia	Pennsylvania	188		I
St. Luke's University Health Network - Bethlehem Campus	Bethlehem	Pennsylvania	480	I	
Temple University Hospital	Philadelphia	Pennsylvania	722	I	
Thomas Jefferson University Hospital	Philadelphia	Pennsylvania	957	I	
UPMC Altoona	Altoona	Pennsylvania	380	II	
UPMC Children's Hospital of Pittsburgh	Pittsburgh	Pennsylvania	315		I
UPMC Mercy	Pittsburgh	Pennsylvania	404	I	
UPMC Presbyterian	Pittsburgh	Pennsylvania	900	I	
WellSpan York Hospital	York	Pennsylvania	596	I	
Rhode Island Hospital	Providence	Rhode Island	719	I	I
Grand Strand Medical Center	Myrtle Beach	South Carolina	371	I	
Greenville Memorial Hospital	Greenville	South Carolina	814	I	II
MUSC Children's Hospital	Charleston	South Carolina	279		I
MUSC Health University Medical Center	Charleston	South Carolina	865	I	
Prisma Health Richland	Columbia	South Carolina	649	I	II
Self Regional Healthcare	Greenwood	South Carolina		III	
Spartanburg Medical Center	Spartanburg	South Carolina	747	I	
Trident Medical Center	Charleston	South Carolina		II	
Avera McKennan Hospital & University Health Center	Sioux Falls	South Dakota		II	
Avera Sacred Heart Hospital	Yankton	South Dakota		III	
Avera St. Luke's Hospital	Aberdeen	South Dakota		III	
Monument Health Rapid City Hospital	Rapid City	South Dakota		II	
Sanford USD Medical Center	Sioux Falls	South Dakota	545	I	II
Johnson City Medical Center	Johnson City	Tennessee	416	I	
Bristol Regional Medical Center	Bristol	Tennessee	312	III	
Holston Valley Medical Center	Kingsport	Tennessee	505	III	
Erlanger Baroness Hospital	Chattanooga	Tennessee	813	I	
Regional One Health (The Med)	Memphis	Tennessee	300	I	
Le Bonheur Children's Hospital	Memphis	Tennessee	255		I
TriStar Skyline Medical Center	Nashville	Tennessee	407	I	
University of Tennessee Medical Center	Knoxville	Tennessee	710	I	
Vanderbilt University Medical Center	Nashville	Tennessee	1019	I	I
Ascension Seton Williamson	Round Rock	Texas		II	
Baylor Scott & White Medical Center - Grapevine	Grapevine	Texas		II	
Baylor Scott & White Medical Center - Hillcrest	Waco	Texas		II	
Baylor Scott & White Medical Center - Lake Pointe	Rowlett	Texas	176	III	
Baylor Scott & White Medical Center - Temple	Temple	Texas	636	I	II
Baylor University Medical Center	Dallas	Texas	1025	I	
Ben Taub Hospital	Houston	Texas	586	I	
Brooke Army Medical Center	Fort Sam Houston	Texas	450	I	
CHI St. Joseph Health Regional Hospital	Bryan	Texas		II	
Children's Medical Center Dallas	Dallas	Texas	496		I
CHRISTUS Mother Frances Hospital - Tyler	Tyler	Texas		II	
CHRISTUS Spohn Hospital Corpus Christi - Shoreline	Corpus Christi	Texas		II	
Cook Children's Medical Center	Fort Worth	Texas		II	
Covenant Children's Hospital	Lubbock	Texas		II	
Covenant Medical Center	Lubbock	Texas		II	
Del Sol Medical Center	El Paso	Texas	350	II	
Dell Children's Medical Center of Central Texas	Austin	Texas	248	I	
Dell Seton Medical Center at The University of Texas	Austin	Texas	211	I	
Doctors Hospital at Renaissance	Edinburg	Texas		I	
HCA Houston Healthcare Clear Lake	Webster	Texas		II	
HCA Houston Healthcare Conroe	Conroe	Texas	342	II	
John Peter Smith Hospital	Fort Worth	Texas	573	I	
Las Palmas Medical Center	El Paso	Texas	327	III	
McAllen Medical Center	McAllen	Texas		I	
Medical Center Hospital	Odessa	Texas		II	
Medical City Arlington	Arlington	Texas	432	II	
Medical City Dallas Hospital	Dallas	Texas	876	II	
Medical City Denton	Denton	Texas	208	II	
Medical City Plano	Plano	Texas	603	I	
Memorial Hermann–Texas Medical Center	Houston	Texas	1104	I	
Memorial Hermann The Woodlands Medical Center	The Woodlands	Texas	351	II	
Methodist Charlton Medical Center	Dallas	Texas		III	
Methodist Dallas Medical Center	Dallas	Texas	556	I	
Methodist Mansfield Medical Center	Mansfield	Texas		III	
Methodist Richardson Medical Center	Richardson	Texas		III	
Parkland Memorial Hospital	Dallas	Texas	882	I	
St. David's Round Rock Medical Center	Round Rock	Texas		II	
St. David's South Austin Medical Center	Austin	Texas		II	
Texas Children's Hospital	Houston	Texas	724		I
Texas Health Harris Methodist Hospital Fort Worth	Fort Worth	Texas		II	
Texas Health Presbyterian Hospital Dallas	Dallas	Texas	875	I	
Texas Health Presbyterian Hospital Plano	Plano	Texas	386	II	
The Hospitals of Providence East Campus	El Paso	Texas	218	II	
The Hospitals of Providence Memorial Campus	El Paso	Texas	500	III	
United Regional Health Care	Wichita Falls	Texas		II	
University Hospital	San Antonio	Texas	633	I	I
University Medical Center	Lubbock	Texas	500	I	
University Medical Center of El Paso	El Paso	Texas	394	I	
University of Texas Medical Branch	Galveston	Texas	550	I	
UT Health Tyler	Tyler	Texas	425	I	
Valley Baptist Medical Center	Harlingen	Texas		II	
Intermountain Medical Center	Murray	Utah	504	I	
McKay-Dee Hospital	Ogden	Utah		II	
Ogden Regional Medical Center	Ogden	Utah		II	
Primary Children's Hospital	Salt Lake City	Utah	289		I
St. Mark's Hospital	Millcreek	Utah		II	
St. George Regional Hospital	Saint George	Utah		II	
University of Utah Hospital	Salt Lake City	Utah	425	I	
Utah Valley Hospital	Provo	Utah	395	II	
The University of Vermont Medical Center	Burlington	Vermont	562	I	
Carilion New River Valley Medical Center	Christianburg	Virginia		III	
Carilion Roanoke Memorial Hospital	Roanoke	Virginia	703	I	I
Children's Hospital of the King's Daughters	Norfolk	Virginia	206		I
Chippenham Hospital	Richmond	Virginia	466	I	
Henrico Doctors' Hospital	Richmond	Virginia	767	II	
Henrico Doctors' Hospital - Forest	Richmond	Virginia		II	
Inova Fairfax Hospital	Falls Church	Virginia	923	I	
Inova Loudoun Hospital	Leesburg	Virginia	220	III	
LewisGale Hospital Montgomery	Blacksburg	Virginia	146	III	
Mary Washington Hospital	Fredericksburg	Virginia	500	II	
Naval Medical Center Portsmouth	Portsmouth	Virginia		II	
University of Virginia Health System	Charlottesville	Virginia	645	I	I
Reston Hospital Center	Reston	Virginia	275	II	
Riverside Regional Medical Center	Newport News	Virginia	576	II	
Sentara Norfolk General Hospital	Norfolk	Virginia	558	I	
Sentara Northern Virginia Medical Center	Woodbridge	Virginia	199	III	
Sentara Virginia Beach General Hospital	Virginia Beach	Virginia	273	III	
Bon Secours Southside Regional Medical Center	Petersburg	Virginia	327	III	
Virginia Commonwealth University Medical Center	Richmond	Virginia	865	I	I
Valley Health Winchester Medical Center	Winchester	Virginia	495	II	
Confluence Health Hospital	Wenatchee	Washington	206	III	III
EvergreenHealth Medical Center	Kirkland	Washington	318	III	
Grays Harbor Community Hospital	Aberdeen	Washington	70	III	
Harborview Medical Center	Seattle	Washington	413	I	I
Island Hospital	Anacortes	Washington	43	III	
Kadlec Regional Medical Center	Richland	Washington	270	II	III
Mary Bridge Children's Hospital	Tacoma	Washington	72		II
MultiCare Auburn Medical Center	Auburn	Washington	162	III	
MultiCare Deaconess Hospital	Spokane	Washington	307	III	
MultiCare Good Samaritan Hospital	Puyallup	Washington	275	III	
MultiCare Tacoma General Hospital	Tacoma	Washington	437	II	
MultiCare Valley Hospital	Spokane Valley	Washington	123	III	
MultiCare Yakima Valley Memorial Hospital	Yakima	Washington	222	III	III
Olympic Memorial Hospital	Port Angeles	Washington	126	III	
Overlake Hospital Medical Center	Bellevue	Washington	347	III	
PeaceHealth Southwest Medical Center	Vancouver	Washington	450	II	
PeaceHealth St. Joseph Medical Center	Bellingham	Washington	253	II	
PeaceHealth St. John Medical Center	Longview	Washington	193	III	
Providence Holy Family Hospital	Spokane	Washington	272	III	
Providence Regional Medical Center Everett	Everett	Washington	468	II	III
Providence Sacred Heart Medical Center and Children's Hospital	Spokane	Washington	648	II	II
Providence St. Mary Medical Center	Walla Walla	Washington	87	III	
Providence St. Peter Hospital	Olympia	Washington	390	III	
Samaritan Healthcare	Moses Lake	Washington	50	III	
Skagit Valley Hospital	Mount Vernon	Washington	137	III	
St. Joseph Medical Center	Tacoma	Washington	343	II	
St. Michaels Medical Center	Silverdale	Washington	248	III	
Berkeley Medical Center	Martinsburg	West Virginia		III	
Cabell Huntington Hospital	Huntington	West Virginia		II	
Camden Clark Medical Center	Parkersburg	West Virginia		III	
Charleston Area Medical Center	Charleston	West Virginia	795	I	
J.W. Ruby Memorial Hospital	Morgantown	West Virginia	880	I	II
Raleigh General Hospital	Beckley	West Virginia		III	
St. Mary's Medical Center	Huntington	West Virginia		II	
Wheeling Hospital	Wheeling	West Virginia	223	III	
Aspirus Wausau Hospital	Wausau	Wisconsin		II	
Aurora BayCare Medical Center	Green Bay	Wisconsin		II	
Aurora Medical Center Summit	Summit	Wisconsin		II	
Children's Hospital of Wisconsin	Milwaukee	Wisconsin	298		I
Froedtert Hospital	Milwaukee	Wisconsin	735	I	
Gundersen Lutheran Medical Center	La Crosse	Wisconsin	325	II	
Marshfield Medical Center	Marshfield	Wisconsin		II	II
Mayo Clinic Health System - Eau Claire	Eau Claire	Wisconsin		II	
Mayo Clinic Health System - La Crosse	La Crosse	Wisconsin		III	
SSM Health Saint Mary's Hospital – Madison	Madison	Wisconsin		II	
Mercyhealth Hospital and Trauma Center - Janesville	Janesville	Wisconsin		III	
St. Vincent Hospital	Green Bay	Wisconsin		II	
ThedaCare Regional Medical Center–Neenah	Neenah	Wisconsin		II	
UW Health University Hospital	Madison	Wisconsin	505	I	I
Cheyenne Regional Medical Center	Cheyenne	Wyoming	222	III	
Banner Wyoming Medical Center	Casper	Wyoming	249	II	
