= Parkview Health (Ohio) =

Coordinates: 41°28′27″N 84°33′27″W

Geography
- Location: Bryan, Ohio, United States

Organization
- Care system: Hospital Council of Northwest Ohio

Services
- Emergency department: Yes
- Beds: 113 Bryan, 25 Montpelier

Helipads
- Helipad: FAA LID: 82OH

History
- Founded: 1976

Links
- Website: http://www.chwchospital.org
- Lists: Hospitals in Ohio

Parkview Health, formerly known as Community Hospitals and Wellness Centers (CHWC), serves Williams County, Ohio, United States, and surrounding areas.

== Facilities ==
=== Bryan Hospital ===
The flagship campus in Bryan, Ohio is a 113 bed rural federally qualified health center. It is equipped with an emergency department, an OB and maternity unit, surgical suites, vascular diagnostic imaging and a heart catheterization system, a radiation oncology treatment center, and a helipad for medical evacuation.

Bryan Hospital also features a number of specialty medical clinics including ear, nose, and throat; cardiology; pain management; urology; orthopedics; wound care; and others.

Additional services offered at Bryan Hospital include physical, occupational, and speech therapy; nutrition and diabetes education; cardiac rehabilitation; and mental health and counseling.

In early 2015, CHWC formed the Vantage Healthcare of Ohio, LLC collaborative with seven other hospitals from Northwest Ohio as a means to pool resources and overall save money. The partnership includes Bellevue Hospital (Bellevue), Blanchard Valley Health System (Findlay), Fisher-Titus Medical Center (Norwalk), Fulton County Health Center (Wauseon), Henry County Hospital (Napoleon), Magruder Memorial Hospital (Port Clinton), and Wood County Hospital (Bowling Green).

=== Montpelier Hospital ===
The outlying Montpelier, Ohio campus is a 25-bed rural critical access hospital that specializes in rehabilitative services. It is also equipped with an emergency department, imaging and radiology, a laboratory, a sleep disorder center, and neuropsychology. Both the Bryan Hospital and the Montpelier Hospital emergency departments see 17,500 patients per year.

=== Archbold Medical Center ===
The Archbold Medical Center—located in Archbold, Ohio—offers outpatient services such as physical, occupational, and speech therapy; imaging and radiology; pain management; ear, nose, and throat; gastroenterology; and other medical specialty clinics. Upon completed construction of Archbold Medical Center in 1998, the organization was renamed to recognize its expansion into Fulton County, from Community Hospitals of Williams County to Community Hospitals and Wellness Centers.

== Accreditation ==
CHWC is accredited by The Joint Commission.
