= Fulton County Health Center =

Geography
- Location: Wauseon, Ohio
- Coordinates: 41°32′18″N 84°7′58″W

Organisation
- Care system: Hospital Council of Northwest Ohio
- Type: General

Services
- Emergency department: Yes
- Beds: 106; 20 bed ER

Helipads
- Helipad: FAA LID: OH73

History
- Founded: 1903 / 1930 / 1973

Links
- Website: fultoncountyhealthcenter.org

Fulton County Health Center (FCHC) is a rural critical access hospital. It serves the community of Fulton County, and is located in Wauseon Ohio.

== Patient care statistics ==
U.S. News & World Report collates the number of patients seen by the hospital annually, as follows:

• Emergency visits:	16,398
• Admissions:	1746
• Inpatient surgeries:	501
• Outpatient surgeries:	2,369

== Facilities ==
=== Hospital ===
The FCHC facility is equipped as a general medical and surgery hospital, with the following special units:

- Emergency department with 20 beds.
- Helipad for medical evacuation.
- Vascular diagnostic imaging and a heart catheterization system.
- Wound care and hyperbaric oxygen therapy (HBOT).
- Oncology treatment center.
- Critical care unit.
- Obstetrics and birthing center.
- Sleep medicine.

=== Health center ===
The FCHC campus covers 28 acres. On the grounds are additional facilities that together comprise a complete health care center for the community. They include:

- Fulton Manor and Fulton Suites, a nursing home.
- FulCare Behavioral Health, a mental health facility.
- Dialysis center operated by DaVita Inc.
- Free Care Clinic at FCHC Medical Office Building.

=== Community ===
A fitness center is located within a rehabilitation facility in Wauseon's historic downtown business district, near the original Wauseon City Hospital.

The hospital's sleep lab has been expanded off-campus to Swanton, Ohio with two more beds, which doubles the capacity of FCHC's sleep medicine department.

== History ==
FCHC has published a newsletter since 2009 named "Health Centering," which is mailed quarterly to residents in the community. PDF versions are available on the website, and these past issues contain a rich history of the hospital.

=== Early history ===
1903: Wauseon's first City Hospital was built originally as Wauseon High School in 1868. When the school moved, the building was converted and used as a hospital in 1903. The old hospital still stands today and houses the Fulton County, Ohio Historical Society.

1930: Detwiler Memorial Hospital was built in 1929 and opened in 1930. After a new hospital was built across the road, the county converted the hospital into a nursing home called Detwiler Manor. Later, the manor moved across the road to facilities on the current hospital campus. The beautiful historic brick building was renovated, once again re-purposed, and now houses the Fulton County's Job & Family Services offices.

=== Today's campus ===
The government of Fulton County, Ohio, owns the campus property.

1973: The current hospital facility opened in 1973, and was very progressive in design, featuring single-patient private rooms. Private rooms, while initially expensive to build, keep patients safer from hospital-acquired infections like MRSA.

While originally built a size large enough to house 106 beds, changing community needs have resulted in FCHC now having only a maximum 25-bed in-patient capacity, complying with federal Critical Access Hospital (CAH) guidelines. Many of the former patient rooms have been converted to other uses.

1996: The 1990s saw the former hospital across the road, now serving as Detwiler Manor, becoming dated. New nursing home facilities were built on the hospital campus, and Fulton Manor and Fulton Suites opened in 1996.

2001: A 31,000 square foot Medical Offices Building was added onto the main hospital building in 2001. It contains medical offices, a surgery center, and the Rainbow Hematology Oncology Center. The oncology center saw about 3,700 patients per year before moving to the new facility.

2007: As the community grew, the emergency room was filled at least once a week, and often multiple times per day. A new emergency department, furnished with a trauma room and a pediatric care room, was built in 2007. A new outpatient surgery facility was also included. The three-story addition covers 60,000 square feet. 2007 also seen new construction completed for a kidney dialysis center on the campus grounds, funded by Dorthy Biddle's estate, after she died at age 106. Previously, residents of Fulton County had to drive to Bryan, Defiance, or Toledo three times a week for dialysis.

2015: FCHC formed the Vantage Healthcare of Ohio, LLC collaborative with seven other hospitals from Northwest Ohio as a means to pool resources and overall save money. The partnership includes Bellevue Hospital (Bellevue), Blanchard Valley Health Systems (Findlay), Community Hospitals and Wellness Centers (Bryan), Fisher-Titus Medical Center (Norwalk), Henry County Hospital (Napoleon), Magruder Memorial Hospital (Port Clinton), and Wood County Hospital (Bowling Green).

2016: Expansion continues today, with 69,000 square feet of medical offices being added presently, with completion planned for late 2016 or early 2017. The cost is estimated to be $6,500,000.

A Health Care Camp is held in the summer for high school students contemplating seeing health care as a career. It is coordinated with school districts from Wauseon, Delta, Napoleon, Hilltop, Pettisville, Stryker, Liberty Center, and Toledo, by an adjunct faculty member at Jackson College in Jackson, Michigan.

== Awards ==
FCHC carries the Women's Choice Award seal. It also ranks as one of the top 100 hospitals in America, as determined by health care ratings collated by the U.S. Department of Health & Human Services' Consumer Assessment of Healthcare Providers and Systems (HCAHPS) database.

The Fulton Manor received an award from Design Magazine for the layout of their patient rooms.

In 2015, the hospital's Director of Nursing received the Ohio Organization of Nurse Executives Nurse Leadership Award.

== Accreditation ==
FCHC is accredited by The Joint Commission. The Rainbow Hematology Oncology Treatment Center is accredited by the Commission on Cancer since 1993.
