= Southern Ohio Medical Center =

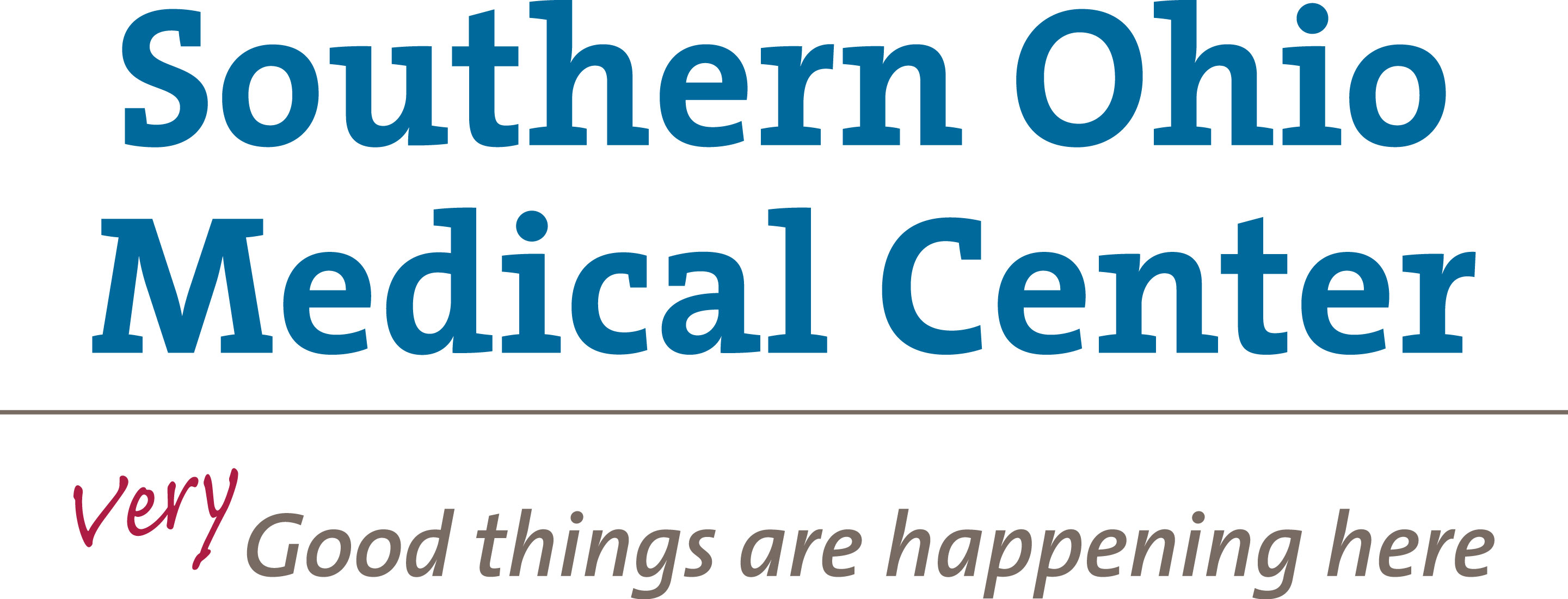

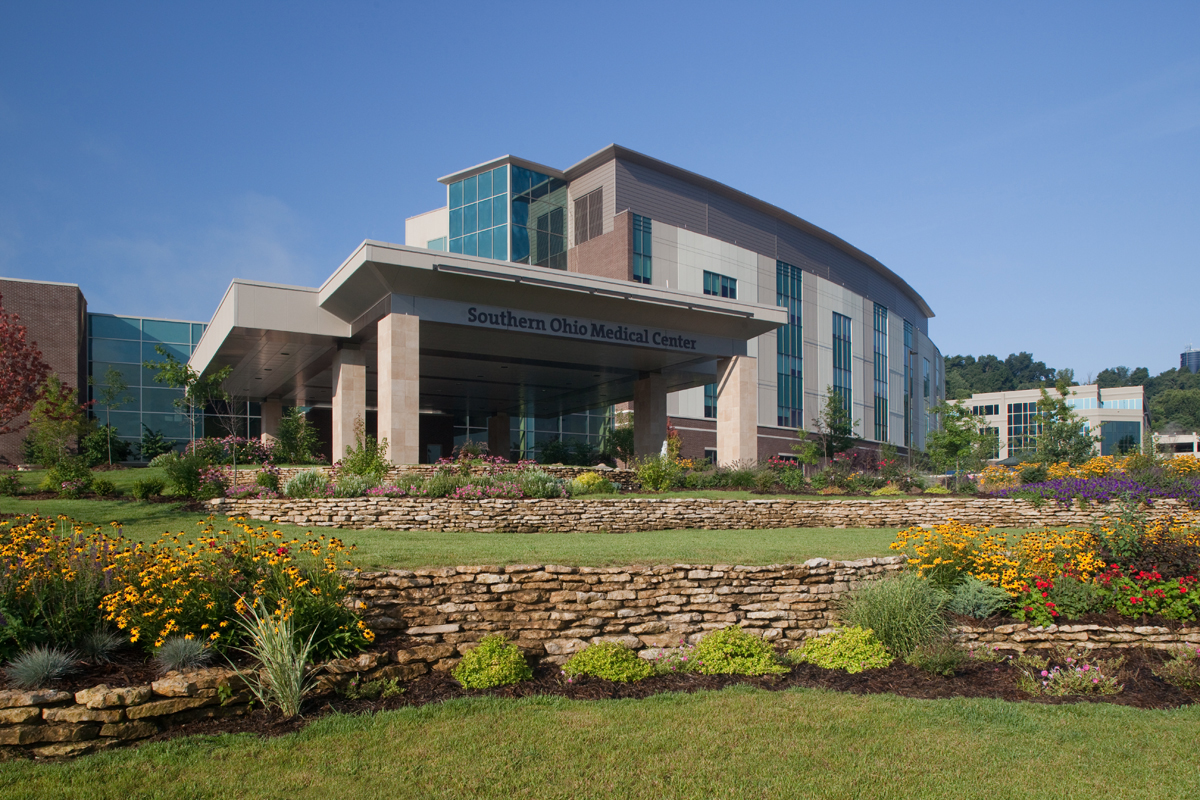
- The main campus of Southern Ohio Medical Center, located in Portsmouth, Ohio.

Geography
- Location: 1805 27th Street, Portsmouth, Ohio, United States of America
- Coordinates: 38°45′12″N 82°58′42″W

Organisation
- Care system: Not-For-Profit
- Type: General

Helipads
- Helipad: FAA LID: OH62

Links
- Website: http://www.somc.org/
- Other links: Hospitals in Ohio

Southern Ohio Medical Center (or SOMC) is a 216-bed 501(C)(3) not-for-profit hospital in Portsmouth, Ohio. It provides emergency and surgical care, as well as other health care services. SOMC employs 2,600 full-time employees and part-time employees, has a medical staff of more than 140 physicians and specialists, and is supported by approximately 800 volunteers. In 2020, Fortune magazine ranked Southern Ohio Medical Center at number 22 of their Fortune List of the Top 100 Companies to Work For based on an employee survey of satisfaction.

== Programs and services ==
SOMC offers inpatient and outpatient programs and services. Services offered at SOMC include:

- Anticoagulation Clinic
- Diabetes Education
- Dietary Services
- Emergency Department Care
- Home Health Services
- Laboratory Services
- Maternity Services
- Medical Education
- Pastoral Care
- Pediatric Services
- Radiology
- Rehabilitation
- Respiratory
- Senior Behavioral Medicine Care
- Sleep Diagnostic Services
- Speech and Hearing Services
- Surgical Services

== Centers of care ==
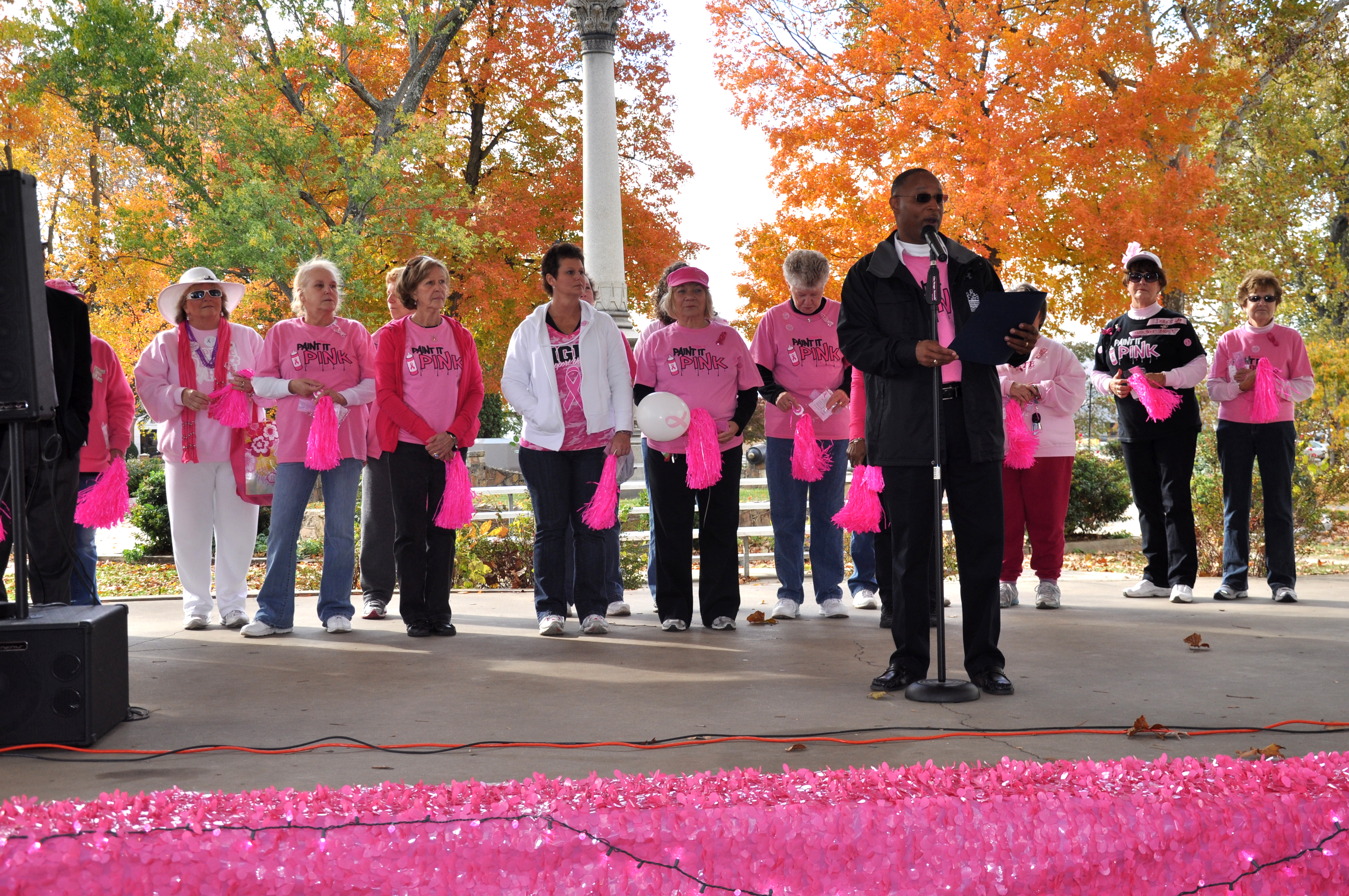
Portsmouth Mayor David Malone declares October 20, 2012 to be "Paint It Pink" day.

=== SOMC Cancer Center ===
Services offered at the SOMC Cancer Center include:

- Medical Oncology, which involves treatment of cancer with chemicals, biological products and immunotherapy
- Radiation Oncology, or the careful use of high-energy radiation to treat cancer The goal of radiation therapy is to deliver a precisely measured dose to the cancerous tumor, while protecting normal tissue around the tumor
- Hematology, or the diagnosis and treatment of diseases of the blood and blood forming organs
- Genetic Testing, a type of medical test that identifies changes in chromosomes, genes, or proteins. Most of the time, testing is used to find changes that are associated with inherited disorders
- Clinical Trials, studies that evaluate the effectiveness of new drugs and strategies

In addition to providing cancer care, SOMC also holds annual breast cancer awareness events (referred to as “pink outs” or by the name “Paint It Pink”) to coincide with October's designation as Breast Cancer Awareness Month. The events have received positive community feedback and helped raise money for the SOMC Breast Cancer Compassion Fund. The Breast Cancer Compassion Fund provides money to help support breast cancer patients with expenses such as utilities, medications, transportation and common necessities needed during cancer care.

In 2012, Portsmouth Mayor David Malone declared October 20 “Paint It Pink Day.” That year's event also grew to include a 5k run/walk.

SOMC has also worked to raise breast cancer awareness by creating a “Pink Glove Dance” YouTube video featuring local residents and hospital employees.

=== Heart and vascular ===
The SOMC Heart Care Unit is a 12-bed unit responsible for the care of adult cardiac patients and patients recovering from open heart surgery. SOMC utilizes a Universal Bed Model, in which the patient's room essentially changes throughout the open-heart procedure, starting as an intensive care recovery room on arrival from surgery and transitioning to a home-like environment with family space and amenities. Heart and Vascular services provided at SOMC include:

- Angioplasty
- Heart Bypass Surgery
- Cardiac Catheterization
- Cardiac Rehabilitation
- Stenting

=== Hospice ===
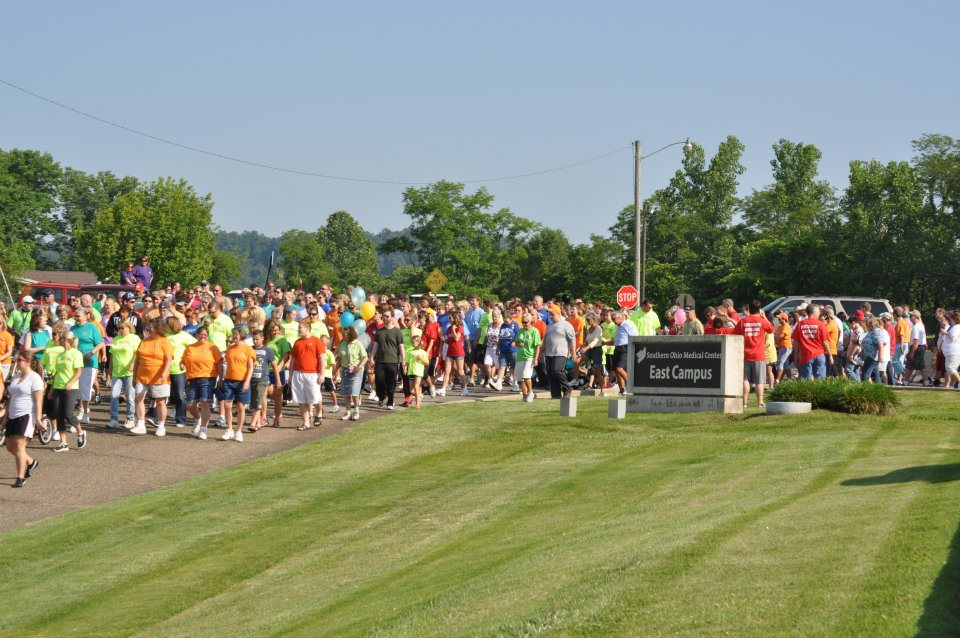
A crowd waits for the start of "Hike for Hospice," an annual event that raises funds for the SOMC Hospice program.

SOMC Hospice offers a variety of services, including:

- Pain and symptom management
- Home health aide/homemaker services
- Spiritual care
- Medical social services
- Counseling
- Short-term inpatient care
- Bereavement support

=== SOMC LIFE Center ===
The LIFE Center provides full service fitness and rehabilitation facilities in Scioto County through centers in Portsmouth, Wheelersburg and Lucasville.

Additionally, SOMC has hosted events designed to promote fitness and physical activity, such as the ‘Tri For Your LIFE’ sprint triathlon and ‘Run for your LIFE’ 5/10k.

In its first year, SOMC's ‘Tri For Your LIFE’ triathlon featured more than 100 competitors.

=== Wound Healing Center ===
The SOMC Wound Healing Center treats diabetic ulcers, lower leg ulcers, press ulcers, bone infection, gangrene, skin tears or lacerations, radiation burns, post-operation wounds and infections and failed or compromised skin grafts. Services offered include:

- Hyberbaric Oxygen Therapy
- Wound Debridement, a minor surgical procedure enhances the growth of healthy tissues in the wound
- Transcutaneous Oxygen Monitoring, a test that records the level of oxygen available to your wound
- Doppler Evaluation of Pulses, a technique that measures the blood flow available to bring nutrients and medications to the wound

=== SOMC urgent care ===
SOMC has three urgent care facilities, located in Portsmouth, Wheelersburg, and Waverly. At each of the facilities, staff put an emphasis on having patients treated and discharged within 60 minutes of their arrival.

=== MAGNET designation ===
In 2008, Southern Ohio Medical Center became the first hospital in the tri-state region (Ohio, Kentucky, West Virginia) to earn Magnet Recognition from the American Nurses Credentialing Center. The Magnet Recognition Program recognizes healthcare organizations for quality patient care, nursing excellence and innovations in professional nursing practice. In 2011, less than 7% of hospitals in the United States were able to achieve Magnet Recognition.

SOMC earned Magnet re-designation in 2013.

=== FORTUNE, Modern Healthcare and Press Ganey awards ===
Southern Ohio Medical Center has been recognized as one of FORTUNE Magazine’s Best Places to Work in America for six straight years.

In 2013, it came in 29th on the list with FORTUNE noting: “Employees are proud to work for a medical provider that has won numerous awards for patient care, a fact that's reflected in its average tenure. Nearly 20% of the staff has worked there for more than 20 years.”

SOMC was recognized on the FORTUNE list again in 2014 (coming in 18th) and 2015 (coming in 44th). In the 2015 survey, 93% of SOMC employees described their workplace as "a great place to work."

Modern Healthcare Magazine also recognized SOMC as one of the nation's best healthcare employers in 2010, 2011 and 2012.

In 2012, Southern Ohio Medical Center was one of only 13 Press Ganey clients in the nation to be chosen as a Distinctive Workplace Award winner. The award was given to organizations that reached, and sustained, the 95th percentile in employee satisfaction – SOMC was at the 99th percentile.

=== VPP star designation, OHA top 20 percent ===
Southern Ohio Medical Center has also received VPP Star Designation, an award distributed by the Occupational Safety and Health Administration (OSHA) to hospitals that meet high safety standards. By earning VPP star status, SOMC was recognized as being in the top one percent of hospitals in America for safety excellence leadership.

SOMC also received the Ohio Hospital Association's Top 20 Percent Award for being one of the safest healthcare facilities in the state of Ohio.
