= Ashtabula County Medical Center =

Coordinates: 41°52′51″N 80°47′42″W

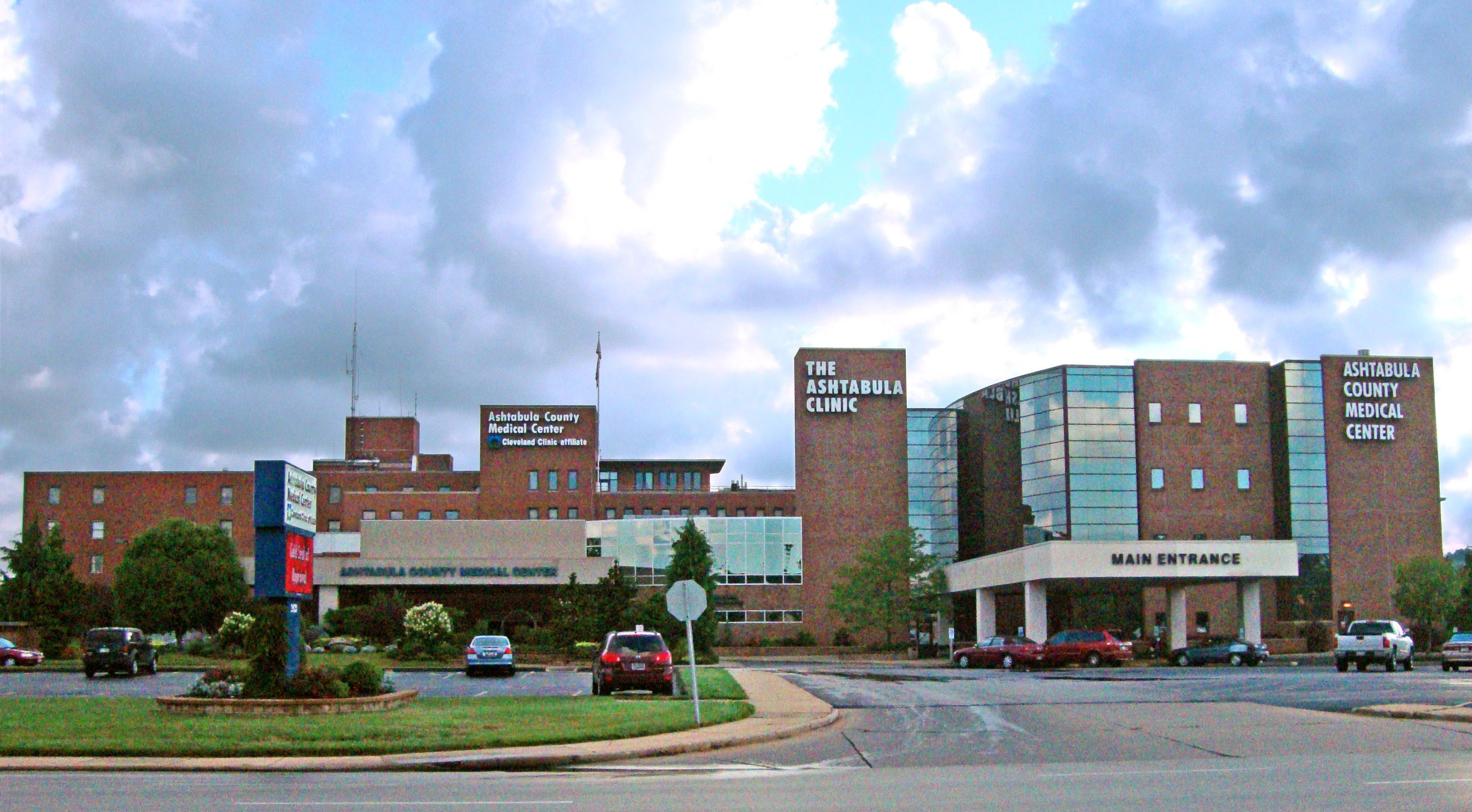
- The hospital building on the left and Clinic on the right

Geography
- Location: 2420 Lake Avenue, Ashtabula, Ohio 44004, United States

Organization
- Care system: Private
- Affiliated university: Cleveland Clinic

Services
- Standards: JCAHO accreditation Magnet status

Helipads
- Helipad: FAA LID: 8OH0

Links
- Website: http://www.acmchealth.org/
- Lists: Hospitals in the United States
- Other links: List of hospitals in the United States

Ashtabula County Medical Center (ACMC) is an affiliate of Cleveland Clinic and is a not for-profit, community-oriented multi-specialty hospital, located in Ashtabula County, Ohio. It serves the people of Ashtabula County and the surrounding areas in Northeastern Ohio and Northwestern Pennsylvania. ACMC, an affiliate of Cleveland Clinic is a 234-licensed bed hospital with over 115 years of caring for the residents of Northeastern Ohio. ACMC's history is rooted in community needs and support. Built in 1904 to deliver care to railroad workers, Ashtabula County Medical Center has evolved from a one-room wood-framed building into the county's only full-service hospital.

The hospital operates the county's only cardiac catheterization lab and behavioral medicine unit, in addition to a sleep disorders lab, as well as many specialized services. The Ashtabula Clinic is a multi-speciality group physician practice connected to the hospital.

== History ==
The Ashtabula River Railroad Disaster on December 29, 1876, was one of the greatest train disasters in American history. The Pacific Express number 5 was traveling through Ashtabula, heading west, during a heavy snowstorm. The iron bridge that carried trains over the “gulf”, a gorge formed by the Ashtabula River, fractured in the center and the eleven cars and 159 passengers plunged seventy feet to the bottom of the gorge. There was no hospital in the county at the time. Residents soon realized that there could be future disasters, as well as other illnesses and injuries in the community – and that a local hospital was needed. The first hospital in Ashtabula was built just a few hundred yards from the bridge that failed the night of the train disaster.

Ashtabula General Hospital's first board of trustees

ACMC began as a small emergency hospital used to care for injured railroad workers at the end of 19th century. In 1882, the Ladies Railroad Auxiliary was formed to care for the patients in this temporary hospital. In 1892, the Ladies Hospital League was organized and provided the impetus to establish a proper hospital for the people of Ashtabula. The diligent work of the league was rewarded on Feb. 12, 1902, with the organization of the Ashtabula General Hospital Association. This nonprofit corporation raised $22,538 and, on June 30, 1904, Ashtabula General Hospital opened. Shortly after the Ashtabula General Hospital opened in 1904, young women enters its nursing-training school. With the increase in the number enrolling by the 1920s, the Amelia E.Lewis Nurses' Home (currently known as the Lewis Building) opened on February 27, 1930.

The Amelia Lewis Nurses Home erected in 1930, currently used for office building (Lewis Building)

In 1952, a new 150-bed hospital opened. A new wing, built in 1963, brought the hospital up to 226 beds. In 1975, the city celebrated the opening of a new two-story south wing.

The new Ashtabula General Hospital dedicated on March 21, 1952

In 1983, the corporate structure of Ashtabula General Hospital was reorganized, resulting in the establishment of a not-for-profit parent corporation known as Ashtabula Community Health Services. The hospital became a parent-subsidiary structure, changing its name to the Ashtabula County Medical Center. In 1987, the ACMC Foundation, a program designed to help the hospital meet the challenges of the changing conditions in the health care arena, was initiated. The foundation committee members chose services that were not previously available anywhere else in the county as their campaign projects. Those projects have included the Emergency Department's Fast Track area, a new Behavioral Medicine Unit, renovations of the Maternity Suite and the cardiac catheterization lab.

In 1986, nurses at the then Ashtabula General Hospital ended a 570-day long strike that had started in 1980.

In December 2008, ACMC invested $3.5 million to bring the gold standard of diagnosing heart disease – cardiac catheterization – to the community by building the Cleveland Clinic Cardiac Catheterization Lab at ACMC - the first Cardiac Catheterization Lab (commonly known as the Cath Lab) in Ashtabula County. ACMC provides OB/GYN care and maternity/birthing services in a newly renovated maternity unit.

== Affiliation ==
In 1994, Ashtabula County Medical Center affiliated with the renowned Cleveland Clinic to provide anesthesia, radiology, pathology and pain management services. Later that year, ACMC acquired Glenbeigh to ensure alcohol and chemical dependency programs would remain in the county. In 1999, ACMC became an affiliate of the Cleveland Clinic Health System (CCHS). Since 2001, the president and CEO of Ashtabula County Medical Center, as well as several key executives, became employed by Cleveland Clinic and have dual accountability to the ACMC Board of Trustees and to Cleveland Clinic leadership. ACMC merged with The Ashtabula Clinic, a multi-specialty physician practice, in 1995, establishing an integrated physician-hospital delivery system in the county.

== Reputation ==
ACMC is the only full-service hospital in Ashtabula County. The hospital discharges just under 7,000 patients, performs approximately 8,000 inpatient and outpatient surgeries, treats over 35,000 people in the Emergency Department, conducts over 65,000 diagnostic tests and delivers approximately 400 babies each year.

The ACMC Healthcare System has also been recognized as one of the 99 Best Places to Work in Northeast Ohio for eight consecutive years and as a Great Workplace by Workplace Dynamics.

Ashtabula County Medical Center is accredited by The Joint Commission and is the largest private employer in the county.

ACMC is the only hospital in Ashtabula County to be certified in chest pain, heart failure and stroke treatment. In addition, ACMC is the only hospital in Ashtabula County to offer cardiac catheterization, behavioral medicine, and comprehensive wound care and hyperbaric oxygen therapy.

Ashtabula County Medical Center is an affiliate of Cleveland Clinic, which was ranked second in the United States by U.S. News & World Report.

== ACMC Healthcare System ==
The ACMC Healthcare System includes Ashtabula County Medical Center, The Ashtabula Clinic, Glenbeigh Hospital and Outpatient Centers, Ashtabula Regional Home Health, the ACMC Foundation and a 50 percent ownership of Community Care Ambulance.

The healthcare system is unique in also having a fitness center, The Premiere Fitness which offers a medical-based approach to health and wellness. Pulse is Ashtabula County Medical Center's community newsletter published regularly as a community service for the friends and patrons of Ashtabula County Medical Center providing wellness and health maintenance tips.

== The Ashtabula Clinic ==
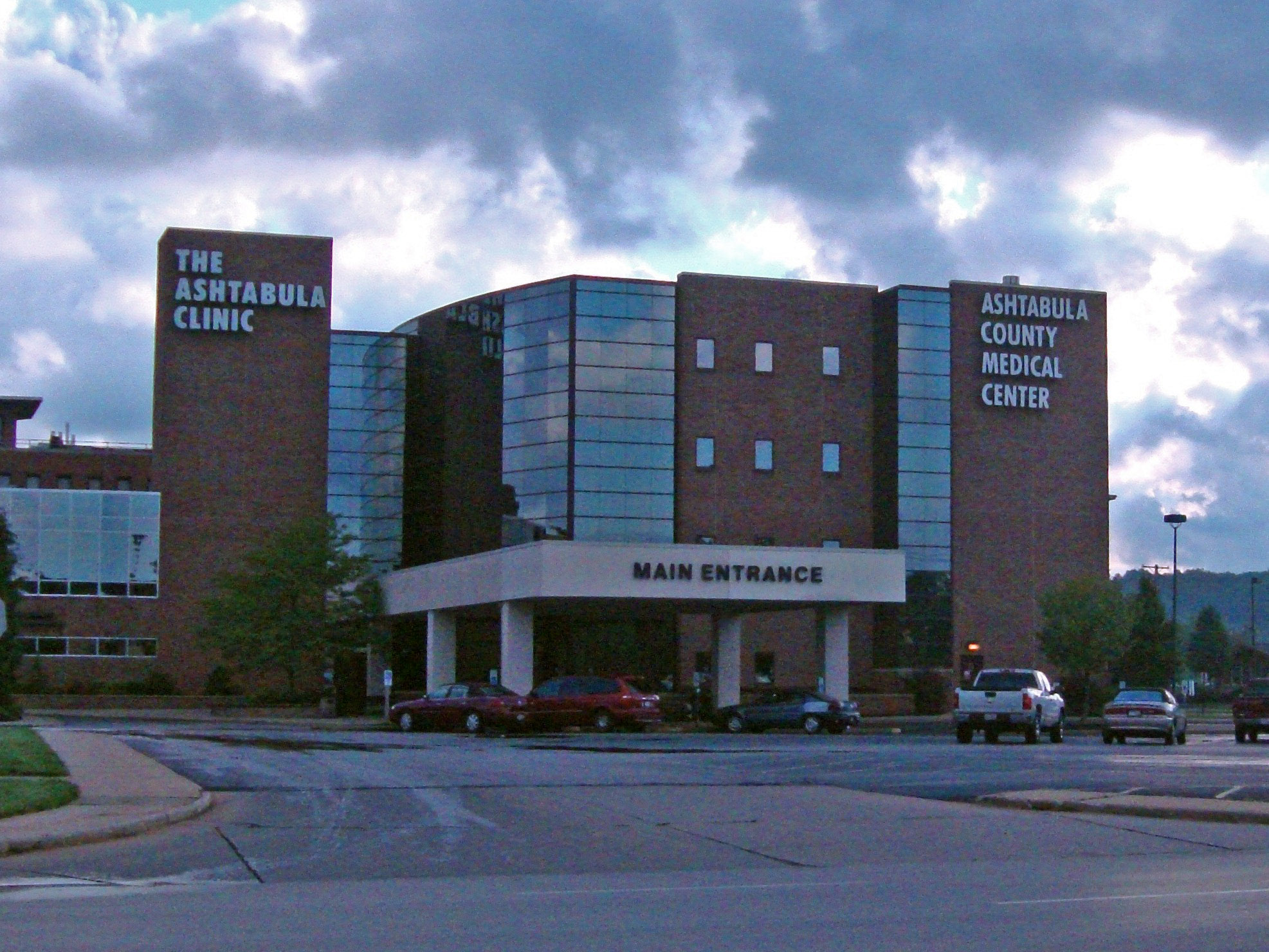
The Ashtabula Clinic

The Ashtabula Clinic (TAC) is a multi-specialty physician practice that serves the residents of the Ashtabula County with out-patient services in allergy/immunology, pediatrics, primary care/internal medicine, family medicine, cardiology, general surgery, orthopaedic surgery, neurology, vascular surgery, ophthalmology, oncology, otolaryngology, OB/GYN, psychiatry, gastroenterology, sleep disorders medicine, pediatric cardiology, podiatry, behavioral medicine (adult and geriatric), urology, and pulmonology.

TAC also operates satellite clinics in the communities of Conneaut, Jefferson and North Kingsville.

== See also ==
- List of hospitals in Ohio
- Medical centers in the United States
