= List of hospitals in Ohio =

This is a list of hospitals in Ohio (U.S. state), sorted by name.

Hospital	City	County	Beds	Trauma	Founded	Original name
Access Hospital Dayton	Dayton	Montgomery	110	x	2011	–
Adams County Regional Medical Center	Seaman	Adams	25	x	1948	Adams County Hospital
Adena Fayette Medical Center	Washington Court House	Fayette	25	x	1950	Fayette County Memorial Hospital
Adena Pike Medical Center	Waverly	Pike	25	x	1958	Pike Community Hospital
Adena Regional Medical Center	Chillicothe	Ross	266	x	1895	Chillicothe Hospital
Akron Children's Hospital	Akron	Summit	289	Level I	1890	Akron Day Nursery
Ashtabula County Medical Center (Cleveland Clinic affiliate)	Ashtabula	Ashtabula	234	x	1904	Ashtabula General Hospital
ACMC Healthcare System Glenbeigh (Cleveland Clinic affiliate)	Rock Creek	Ashtabula		x	1981	Glenbeigh Hospital
Aultman Alliance Community Hospital	Alliance	Stark	202	x	1901	Deaconess Home
Aultman Hospital	Canton	Stark	1032	Level II	1892	–
Aultman Orrville Hospital	Orrville	Wayne	25	x	1951	Dunlap Memorial Hospital
Avita Health System Bucyrus Hospital	Bucyrus	Crawford	20	x	1932	Bucyrus Community Hospital
Avita Health System Galion Hospital	Galion	Crawford	16	x	1913	Galion Community Hospital
Avita Health System Ontario Hospital	Ontario	Richland	26	x	2017	–
The Bellevue Hospital	Bellevue	Sandusky	50	x	1917	Bellevue Hospital
Blanchard Valley Health System Bluffton Hospital	Bluffton	Allen	25	x	1908	Bluffton Sanatorium
Blanchard Valley Health System Blanchard Valley Hospital	Findlay	Hancock	150	Level III	1891	Findlay Home for Friendless Women and Children
Chillicothe VA Medical Center	Chillicothe	Ross	295	x	1924	Veterans' Bureau
The Christ Hospital	Cincinnati	Hamilton	555	x	1889	–
Cincinnati Children's Hospital Medical Center	Cincinnati	Hamilton	634	Level I	1883	Hospital of the Protestant Episcopal Church
Cincinnati VA Medical Center	Cincinnati	Hamilton	463	x	1924	
Cleveland Clinic	Cleveland	Cuyahoga	1290	x	1921	–
Cleveland Clinic Akron General	Akron	Summit	485	Level I	1915	Peoples Hospital
Cleveland Clinic Akron General Lodi Hospital	Lodi	Medina	20	x	1920	Lodi Sanitarium
Cleveland Clinic Avon Hospital	Avon	Lorain	126	x	2016 (Note: Replaced Lakewood Hospital in Lakewood)	–
Cleveland Clinic Children's Hospital for Rehabilitation	Cleveland	Cuyahoga	25	x	1889	Fresh Air Camp
Cleveland Clinic Euclid Hospital	Euclid	Cuyahoga	166	x	1907	Parkwood Hospital
Cleveland Clinic Fairview Hospital	Cleveland	Cuyahoga	498	Level II	1892	German Hospital
Cleveland Clinic Hillcrest Hospital	Mayfield Heights	Cuyahoga	462	Level II	1968	Doctors Hospital
Cleveland Clinic Lutheran Hospital	Cleveland	Cuyahoga	192	x	1896	Lutheran Hospital
Cleveland Clinic Marymount Hospital	Garfield Heights	Cuyahoga	263	x	1949	Marymount Hospital
Cleveland Clinic Medina Hospital	Medina	Medina	148	x	1944	Medina Hospital
Cleveland Clinic Mentor Hospital (Hillcrest)	Mentor	Lake	34	x	2023	–
Cleveland Clinic Mercy Hospital	Canton	Stark	323	Level II	1908	Mercy Hospital
Cleveland Clinic South Pointe Hospital	Warrensville Heights	Cuyahoga	172	x	1957	Suburban Community Hospital & Brentwood Hospital
Cleveland Clinic Union Hospital	Dover	Tuscarawas	96	x	1906	Tuscarawas Hospital
Clinton Memorial Hospital	Wilmington	Clinton	141	x	1951	
Community Memorial Hospital	Hicksville	Defiance		x	1917	
Coshocton Regional Medical Center	Coshocton	Coshocton	56	x	1909	Keenan Private Hospital
Crystal Clinic Orthopedic Center	Fairlawn	Summit	60	x	2021	–
Dayton Children's Hospital	Dayton	Montgomery	181	Level I	1967	Barney Children's Medical Center
Dayton VA Medical Center	Dayton	Montgomery	356	x	1867	National Home for Disabled Volunteer Soldiers, Dayton
Diley Ridge Medical Center	Canal Winchester	Fairfield	10	x	2010	–
East Liverpool City Hospital	East Liverpool	Columbiana	130	x	1905	–
Fairfield Medical Center	Lancaster	Fairfield	222	x	1916	Lancaster Municipal Hospital
Firelands Regional Medical Center	Sandusky	Erie	287	Level III	1876	Good Samaritan Hospital
Firelands Regional Medical Center South Campus	Sandusky	Erie	287	x	1902	Providence Hospital
Fisher-Titus Medical Center	Norwalk	Huron	99	Level III	1957	Norwalk Memorial Hospital
Fulton County Health Center	Wauseon	Fulton	106	x	1903	Detwiler Memorial Hospital
Genesis Hospital	Zanesville	Muskingum	260	Level III	1891	Zanesville City Hospital
Georgetown Behavioral Hospital	Georgetown	Brown	118	x	2014	–
Grand Lake Joint Township District Memorial Hospital	St. Marys	Auglaize	140	x	1953	Joint Township District Memorial Hospital
Henry County Hospital	Napoleon	Henry	25	x	1919	–
Highland District Hospital	Hillsboro	Highland	25	x	1914	
Hocking Valley Community Hospital (Ohio State affiliate)	Logan	Hocking	35	x	1906	Cherrington Hospital
Holzer Gallipolis	Gallipolis	Gallia	266	x	1910	Holzer Hospital
Holzer Medical Center – Jackson	Jackson	Jackson	269	x	1972	
Insight Hospital and Medical Center Trumbull	Warren	Trumbull	346	Level III	1907	Trumbull Memorial Hospital
Insight Rehabilitation Hospital Hillside	Warren	Trumbull	69	x	1929	Trumbull County Tuberculosis Hospital
Institute for Orthopaedic Surgery	Lima	Allen	12	x	1998	–
Kettering Health Behavioral Medical Center	Miami Township	Montgomery	14	x	2019	–
Kettering Health Dayton	Dayton	Montgomery	344	Level III	1926	Dayton Osteopathic Hospital
Kettering Health Greene Memorial	Xenia	Greene	49	x	1951	Greene Memorial Hospital
Kettering Health Hamilton	Hamilton	Butler	310	Level III	1929	Fort Hamilton Hospital
Kettering Health Main Campus	Dayton	Montgomery	494	Level II	1964	Kettering Memorial Hospital
Kettering Health Miamisburg	Miamisburg	Montgomery	202	x	1978	Sycamore Medical Center
Kettering Health Preble	Eaton	Preble		x	2003	
Kettering Health – Soin Medical Center	Beavercreek	Greene	157	x	2012	–
Kettering Health Springfield	Springfield	Clark		x	2022	–
Kettering Health Troy	Troy	Miami	28	x	2020	–
Kettering Health Washington Township	Washington Township	Montgomery	129	x	1978	Southview Medical Center
Kindred Hospital Dayton	Dayton	Montgomery	97	x	2004	Good Samaritan Hospital
Kindred Hospital Lima	Lima	Allen	26	x	2004	SCCI Hospital Lima
UK King's Daughters Ohio	Portsmouth	Scioto	10	x	2013	King's Daughters Medical Center Ohio
Knox Community Hospital	Mount Vernon	Knox	99	x	1908	Martin Memorial Hospital
Licking Memorial Hospital	Newark	Licking	227	x	1898	Newark Hospital
Lima Memorial Hospital	Lima	Allen	127	Level II	1899	Lima City Hospital
Louis Stokes Cleveland VA Medical Center	Cleveland	Cuyahoga	673	x	1939	Brecksville VA / Crille Hospital
Madison Health (Ohio State affiliate)	London	Madison	45	x	1962	
Magruder Hospital	Port Clinton	Ottawa	25	x	1940	Magruder Memorial Hospital
Mary Rutan Hospital	Bellefontaine	Logan	39	x	1919	–
Mercer County Community Hospital	Coldwater	Mercer	88	x	1950	Our Lady of Mercy Hospital
Mercy Health Allen Hospital	Oberlin	Lorain	25	x	1907	
Mercy Health Anderson Hospital	Anderson Township	Hamilton	226	x	1984	Our Lady of Mercy Hospital - Anderson
Mercy Health Clermont Hospital	Batavia	Clermont	177	x	1973	Clermont County Hospital
Mercy Health - Dayton Springfield Emergency Center	Mad River Township	Clark	10	x	2019	
Mercy Health Defiance Hospital	Defiance	Defiance	23	x	2006	
Mercy Health Fairfield Hospital	Fairfield	Butler	236	x	1978	
Mercy Health Kings Mills Hospital	Kings Mills	Warren	60	x	2024	–
Mercy Health Lorain Hospital	Lorain	Lorain	338	x	1892	St. Joseph's Hospital
Mercy Health Perrysburg Hospital	Perrysburg	Wood	46	x	2019	–
Mercy Health Rehabilitation Hospital	Liberty Township	Trumbull	72	x	2024	–
Mercy Health St. Anne Hospital	Toledo	Lucas	128	x	2002 (Note: Replaced Riverside Mercy Hospital in Toledo)	–
Mercy Health St. Charles Hospital	Oregon	Lucas	410	Level III	1953	St. Charles Hospital
Mercy Health St. Elizabeth Boardman Hospital	Boardman	Mahoning	224	x	2007	
Mercy Health St. Elizabeth Youngstown Hospital	Youngstown	Mahoning	409	Level I	1911	St. Elizabeth Hospital
Mercy Health St. Joseph Warren Hospital	Warren	Trumbull	219	Level III	1924	Riverside Hospital
Mercy Health St. Rita's Medical Center	Lima	Allen	425	Level II	1918	St. Rita's Hospital
Mercy Health St. Vincent Medical Center	Toledo	Lucas	568	Level I (II peds)	1855	St. Vincent Hospital
Mercy Health Springfield Regional Medical Center	Springfield	Clark	254	x	2011	
Mercy Health – The Jewish Hospital	Cincinnati	Hamilton	209	x	1847	The Jewish Hospital
Mercy Health Tiffin Hospital	Tiffin	Seneca	120	x	1913	Mercy Hospital
Mercy Health Urbana Hospital	Urbana	Champaign	25	x	1951	Mercy Memorial Hospital
Mercy Health West Hospital	Cincinnati	Hamilton	222	x	2013	
Mercy Health Willard Hospital	Willard	Huron	20	x	2012	
Memorial Health System Marietta Memorial Hospital	Marietta	Washington	200	Level III	1929	Marietta Memorial Hospital
Memorial Health System Selby General Hospital	Marietta	Washington	35	x	1927	Marietta Osteopathic Clinic
Memorial Hospital	Marysville	Union	51	x	1952	–
MetroHealth Cleveland Heights Medical Center	Cleveland Heights	Cuyahoga	12	x	2018	–
MetroHealth Main Campus Medical Center	Cleveland	Cuyahoga	731	Level I (II peds)	1837	City Hospital
MetroHealth Parma Medical Center	Parma	Cuyahoga	16	Level III	2018	–
Morrow County Hospital	Mt. Gilead	Morrow	25	x	1952	–
Mount Carmel East	Columbus	Franklin	419	Level II	1972	–
Mount Carmel Grove City	Grove City	Franklin	67	x	2019	–
Mount Carmel New Albany	New Albany	Franklin	60	x	2003	–
Mount Carmel St. Ann's	Westerville	Franklin	281	x	1908	St. Ann's Infant Asylum
Nationwide Children's Hospital	Columbus	Franklin	673	Level I	1892	Children's Hospital of Columbus
Ohio State East Hospital	Columbus	Franklin	190	Level III	1890	St. Anthony's Hospital
Ohio State Harding Hospital	Columbus	Franklin	84	x	1916	Columbus Rural Rest Home
Ohio State University Wexner Medical Center	Columbus	Franklin	1800+	Level I	1846	St. Francis Hospital
Ohio Valley Surgical Hospital	Springfield	Clark	24	x	2009	–
OhioHealth Arthur G.H. Bing, MD, Cancer Center	Columbus	Franklin	23	x	2012	–
OhioHealth Berger Hospital	Circleville	Pickaway	83	x	1930	Berger Hospital
OhioHealth Doctors Hospital	Columbus	Franklin	213	x	1963	Doctors Hospital West
OhioHealth Dublin Methodist Hospital	Dublin	Franklin	107	Level III	2008	–
OhioHealth Grady Memorial Hospital	Delaware	Delaware	63	x	1904	Delaware County Hospital
OhioHealth Grant Medical Center	Columbus	Franklin	449	Level I	1900	Grant Hospital
OhioHealth Grove City Methodist Hospital	Grove City	Franklin	26	x	2018	–
OhioHealth Hardin Memorial Hospital	Kenton	Hardin	25	x	1918	McKitrick Hospital
OhioHealth Mansfield Hospital	Mansfield	Richland	326	Level II	1918	Mansfield Hospital
OhioHealth Marion General Hospital	Marion	Marion	250	x	1896	Marion Hospital
OhioHealth Nelsonville Health Center	Nelsonville	Athens	25	x	1950	Mount St. Mary Hospital
OhioHealth O'Bleness Hospital	Athens	Athens	144	x	1921	Sheltering Arms Hospital
OhioHealth Pickerington Methodist Hospital	Pickerington	Fairfield	96	Level III-N	2015	Pickerington Medical Campus
OhioHealth Riverside Methodist Hospital	Columbus	Franklin	1059	Level II	1892	Protestant Hospital
OhioHealth Shelby Hospital	Shelby	Richland	25	x	1921	Shelby Memorial Hospital
OhioHealth Southeastern Medical Center	Cambridge	Guernsey	84	x	1952	Guernsey Memorial Hospital
OhioHealth Van Wert Hospital	Van Wert	Van Wert	34	x	1904	Van Wert County Hospital
Parkview Health Bryan Hospital	Bryan	Williams	113	x	1936	Cameron Hospital
Parkview Health Montpelier Hospital	Montpelier	Williams	25	x	1952	Williams County General Hospital
Paulding County Hospital	Paulding	Paulding	25	x	1941	–
ProMedica Bay Park Hospital	Oregon	Lucas	72	x	2001	–
ProMedica Defiance Regional Hospital	Defiance	Defiance	35	Level III	2002	–
ProMedica Flower Hospital	Sylvania	Lucas	315	x	1910	Flower Hospital
ProMedica Fostoria Community Hospital	Fostoria	Hancock	25	x	1930	Fostoria City Hospital
ProMedica Memorial Hospital	Fremont	Sandusky	43	x	1918	Memorial Hospital
ProMedica Toledo Hospital	Toledo	Lucas	794	Level I (II peds)	1874	Toledo Hospital
Pomerene Hospital	Millersburg	Holmes	55	x	1937	Holmes County Joel Pomerene Memorial Hospital
Premier Health Atrium Medical Center	Middletown	Warren	324	Level III	1917	Middletown Hospital
Premier Health Miami Valley Hospital	Dayton	Montgomery	970	Level I	1890	Protestant Deaconess Hospital
Premier Health Miami Valley Hospital North	Englewood	Montgomery		x	1995	Samaritan North Health Center
Premier Health Miami Valley Hospital South	Centerville	Montgomery	60	Level III	2007	–
Premier Health Upper Valley Medical Center	Troy	Miami	182	Level III	1998 (Note: Replaced Piqua Memorial Hospital, Stouder Memorial Hospital and Dettmer Hospital)	Upper Valley Medical Center
Regency North Central Ohio - Cleveland East (Select Medical)	Warrensville Heights	Cuyahoga	44	x	2007	Regency Hospital Cleveland East
Regency North Central Ohio - Cleveland West (Select Medical)	Middleburg Heights	Cuyahoga	43	x	2007	Regency Hospital Cleveland West
Regency Oregon (Select Medical)	Oregon	Lucas	31	x	2023	
Regency Toledo (Select Medical)	Toledo	Lucas	45	x	2007	Regency Hospital Toledo
Riverview Health Institute	Dayton	Montgomery		x	2004	–
St. Mary's Medical Center, Ironton Campus	Ironton	Lawrence		x	2012	–
Salem Regional Medical Center	Salem	Columbiana	150	x	1913	Salem City Hospital
Shriners Children's Ohio	Dayton	Montgomery	7	x	1968	Cincinnati Shriners Hospital
Southwest General Health Center (University Hospitals affiliate)	Middleburg Heights	Cuyahoga	354	Level III	1920	Sprague Haven
Select Medical Cleveland Clinic Rehabilitation Hospital, Avon	Avon	Lorain	60	x	2015	–
Select Medical Cleveland Clinic Rehabilitation Hospital, Beachwood	Beachwood	Cuyahoga	60	x	2017	–
Select Medical Cleveland Clinic Rehabilitation Hospital, Edwin Shaw	Copley Township	Summit	60	x	2017	–
Select Medical OhioHealth Rehabilitation Hospital - Dublin	Dublin	Franklin	12	x	2021	–
Select Medical Specialty Hospital - Akron	Akron	Summit	60	x	2011	
Select Medical Specialty Hospital - Boardman	Youngstown	Mahoning	45	x		
Select Medical Specialty Hospital - Cleveland-Fairhill	Cleveland	Cuyahoga	68	x		
Select Medical Specialty Hospital - Columbus	Columbus	Franklin	162	x	1940	Doctors Hospital North
Select Medical OhioHealth Rehabilitation Hospital	Columbus	Franklin	74	x	2013	Doctors Hospital North
Select Medical Specialty Hospital - Columbus South	Columbus	Franklin	43	x	1904	Mercy Hospital
Select Medical TriHealth Rehabilitation Hospital	Cincinnati	Hamilton	60	x	2016	–
Southern Ohio Medical Center	Portsmouth	Scioto	211	x	1954	–
Summa Health Akron Campus	Akron	Summit	1049	Level I	1892	City Hospital
Summa Health Barberton Campus	Barberton	Summit	271	x	1915	Barberton Citizens Hospital
Summa Health Wadsworth - Rittman Medical Center	Wadsworth	Medina	113	x	2013	Wadsworth-Rittman Hospital
The Surgical Hospital at Southwoods	Boardman	Mahoning	36	x	1996	
TriHealth Bethesda Butler Hospital	Hamilton	Butler	48	x	2000	Bethesda Butler Hospital
TriHealth Bethesda North Hospital	Montgomery	Hamilton	397	Level III	1970	Bethesda North Hospital
TriHealth McCullough-Hyde Memorial Hospital	Oxford	Butler	32	x	1957	McCullough-Hyde Memorial Hospital
TriHealth Good Samaritan Hospital	Cincinnati	Hamilton	425	x	1852	St. John's Hotel for Invalids
Trinity Health System East Campus	Steubenville	Jefferson	270	x	1912	Ohio Valley Hospital
Trinity Health System St. Clairsville Neighborhood Hospital	St. Clairsville	Belmont	6	x	2025	
Trinity Health System Twin City Medical Center	Dennison	Tuscarawas	25	x	1912	Twin City Hospital
Trinity Health System West Campus	Steubenville	Jefferson		x	1901	Gill Hospital
Trumbull Regional Medical Center	Warren	Trumbull	346	Level III	1907	Trumbull Memorial Hospital
University of Cincinnati Medical Center	Cincinnati	Hamilton	724	Level I	1821	Commercial Hospital and Lunatic Asylum
UC West Chester Hospital	West Chester	Butler	160	Level III	2009	
University Hospitals Ahuja Medical Center	Beachwood	Cuyahoga	193	x	2011	–
University Hospitals Beachwood Medical Center	Beachwood	Cuyahoga	24	x	2019	LakeHealth Beachwood Medical Center
University Hospitals Cleveland Medical Center	Cleveland	Cuyahoga	1032	Level I	1866	Wilson Street Hospital
University Hospitals Conneaut Medical Center	Conneaut	Ashtabula	25	x	1922	Brown Memorial Hospital
University Hospitals Elyria Medical Center	Elyria	Lorain	387	Level III	1908	Elyria Memorial Hospital
University Hospitals Geauga Medical Center	Chardon	Geauga	226	Level III	1925	Corey Hospital
University Hospitals Geneva Medical Center	Geneva	Ashtabula	25	x	1906	Memorial Hospital
University Hospitals Lake West Medical Center	Willoughby	Lake	237	Level III	1961	Lake County Memorial Hospital - West
University Hospitals Parma Medical Center	Parma	Cuyahoga	332	Level III	1961	Parma Community General Hospital
University Hospitals Portage Medical Center	Ravenna	Portage	302	Level III	1894	White Hospital
University Hospitals St. John Medical Center	Westlake	Cuyahoga	204	Level III	1890	St. John of God Hospital
University Hospitals Samaritan Medical Center	Ashland	Ashland	55	x	1912	Samaritan Hospital
University Hospitals TriPoint Medical Center	Concord Township	Lake	144	x	2009 (Note: Replaced LakeEast Hospital in Painesville)	LakeHealth TriPoint Medical Center
The University of Toledo Medical Center	Toledo	Lucas	267	Level II	1964	
Wayne HealthCare Main Campus	Greenville	Darke	92	x	1922	Wayne Hospital
Western Reserve Hospital (University Hospitals affiliate)	Cuyahoga Falls	Summit	89	Level III	1943	Green Cross Hospital
Wilson Health	Sidney	Shelby	44	x	1930	Wilson Memorial Hospital
Wood County Hospital	Bowling Green	Wood	196	x	1951	–
Wooster Community Hospital	Wooster	Wayne	173	x	1950	
Wright-Patterson Medical Center	Dayton	Montgomery	300	x	1956	
WVUMedicine Barnesville Hospital	Barnesville	Belmont	25	x	1928	Barnesville Hospital
WVUMedicine Harrison Community Hospital	Cadiz	Harrison	25	x	1970	Harrison Community Hospital
Wyandot Memorial Hospital	Upper Sandusky	Wyandot	42	x	1950	–

== List of medical systems by number of hospitals ==
Healthcare providers with two or more hospital campuses:

Medical system	Ohio #	Total #	Formation	Oldest hospital	& Year
Mercy Health	22	24	1986	The Jewish Hospital	1847
OhioHealth	17		1984	Riverside Methodist Hospital	1892
Cleveland Clinic Foundation	15	22	1921	Children's Hospital for Rehabilitation	1889
University Hospitals Health System	13		1940	Wilson Street Hospital	1866
Kettering Health	11		1999	Dayton	1926
Select Medical	10 (Note: Counting standalone locations independent of other hospitals or hospital units)	144	1996	Doctors Hospital North	1940
ProMedica	6	11	1986	Toledo Hospital	1874
Veterans Health Administration	5	172	1865	Togus VA Medical Center (ME)	1866
Premier Health	5		1995	Miami Valley Hospital	1890
Mount Carmel Health System	4		1984	Grove City	1886
Regency Hospital Company	4			Regency Toledo (Select Medical)	2007
TriHealth	4		1995	Good Samaritan Hospital	1852
Trinity Health System	4		2000	Gill Hospital	1901
Adena Health System	3		1997	Regional Medical Center	1895
Aultman	3		1892	Aultman Hospital	1892
Avita Health System	3		2011	Galion Hospital	1913
Ohio State Health System	3		1999	Wexner Medical Center	1846
Summa Health	3		1989	Akron Campus	1892
The MetroHealth System	3		1958	Main Campus Medical Center	1837
ACMC Healthcare System	2			Ashtabula County Medical Center	1904
Insight Health Systems	2	3	2008	Insight Hospital and Medical Center (IL)	1852
Kindred Healthcare (ScionHealth)	2	60	1985		
WVUMedicine	2	23	1984	J.W. Ruby Memorial Hospital (WV)	1960
Blanchard Valley Health System	2		1995	Bluffton Hospital	1908
Firelands Regional Medical Center	2		1876	Firelands Regional Medical Center	1876
Holzer Health System	2		1949	Holzer Gallipolis	1910
Memorial Health System	2		2014	Marietta Memorial Hospital	1929
Parkview Health	2		1995	Cameron Hospital	1936
UC Health	2		2009	UC Medical Center	1821
UK HealthCare	1	7		UK King's Daughters Ohio	2013
Marshall Health Network	1	4		St. Mary's Medical Center, Ironton Campus	2012

== Ohio counties without hospitals ==
As of 2024, the following Ohio counties do not have a hospital or inpatient hospital services: Carroll, Meigs, Monroe, Morgan, Noble, Perry, Putnam, Vinton.
