= Aultman Hospital =

Coordinates: 40°47′48″N 81°24′11″W

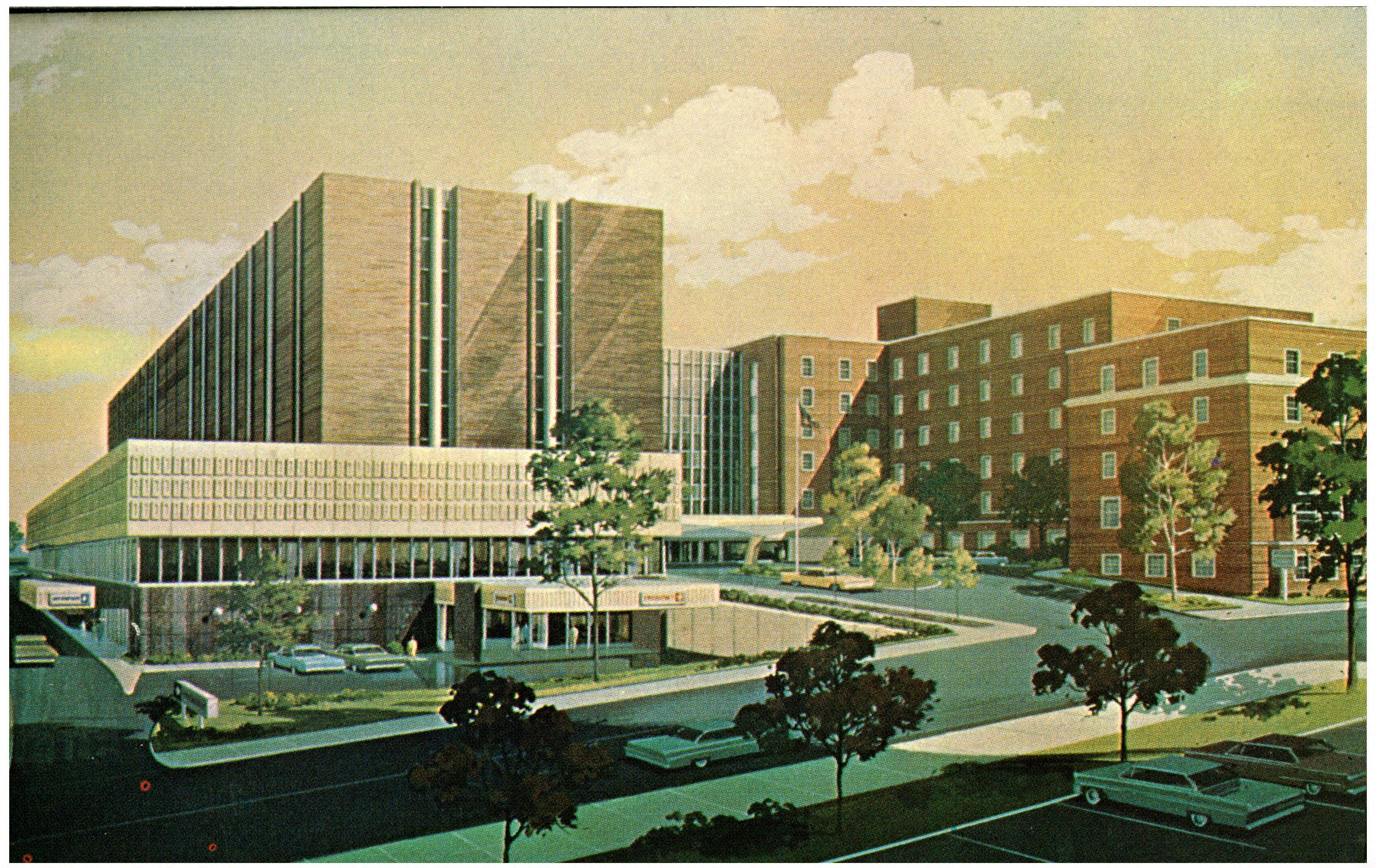

Geography
- Location: 2600 6th St SW, Canton, Ohio, United States

Organization
- Affiliated university: Northeast Ohio Medical University

Services
- Emergency department: Level II Trauma Center
- Beds: 1032

History
- Opened: January 17, 1892

Links
- Website: www.aultman.org
- Lists: Hospitals in Ohio

Aultman Hospital is a non-profit hospital located in Canton, Ohio, United States. It is the largest hospital and the largest employer, with over 5000 employees, in Stark County.

In January 1890, Mrs. Elizabeth Harter, daughter of Cornelius Aultman, purchased 4.5 acres (1.8 ha) of land in the southwest end of Canton. The hospital opened on January 17, 1892.

In 1925, the Harter Building was constructed, adding 100 beds to the 40-room hospital. The McKinley Building opened in 1944, expanding the facility by another 106 beds. Three years later, another 117 beds were added by the opening of the Harter Annex. In 1954, the Main Building and the Morrow House were completed. The Main Building replaced the hospital's original structure and included 139 additional beds. Currently, the hospital boasts 1032 beds and 530 active physicians in 43 specialties. Aultman runs a Preferred Provider Organization, AultCare.

== Awards ==
Aultman Hospital has been the recipient of several awards, including:

- Magnet National Nursing Award
- National Research Corporation: Stark County's "Most Preferred Hospital" for 14 consecutive years
- Ohio Award for Excellence
- J.D. Power and Associates
- Commission on Cancer
- American Heart Association/American Stroke Association
- American Association of Critical-Care Nurses
- 100 Top Hospitals
- Top 50 Cardiac Hospitals
- American Heart Association Triple Gold Recognition, 2008
