= ProMedica Defiance Regional Hospital =

- ProMedica Health System

Geography
- Location: Defiance, Ohio, United States
- Coordinates: 41°17′56″N 84°22′36″W

Organization
- Care system: Public

Services
- Emergency department: Level III trauma center

Links
- Website: www.promedica.org/defiance-regional-hospital/Pages/default.aspx
- Lists: Hospitals in Ohio

ProMedica Defiance Regional Hospital is a public hospital in Defiance, Ohio that is part of the ProMedica Health System.

Their cafeteria is popular with local residents; between January and June 2004, the number of meals served on Sundays more than doubled.

Indianapolis 500 champion Sam Hornish sponsored the creation of a heart facility there in 2006, the Sam Hornish Family Heart Center; by July 2007, it had already performed 700 procedures, saving residents trips to hospitals in Toledo or Fort Wayne.

Also in 2006, Timothy Jakacki took over as president of the hospital, adding onto his duties as head of Fostoria Community Hospital, in a larger management shuffle by ProMedica; he succeeded John Horns, who was promoted to larger regional responsibilities. Jacacki complained of the difficulties of recruiting doctors in rural northwestern Ohio in a later interview; though specialist recruiting remained an issue, he emphasized that some family physicians actually preferred coming to smaller communities like Defiance because it enabled them to broaden their area of practice.
