= Blanchard Valley Health System =

Coordinates: 41°01′03″N 83°39′06″W

Blanchard Valley Hospital

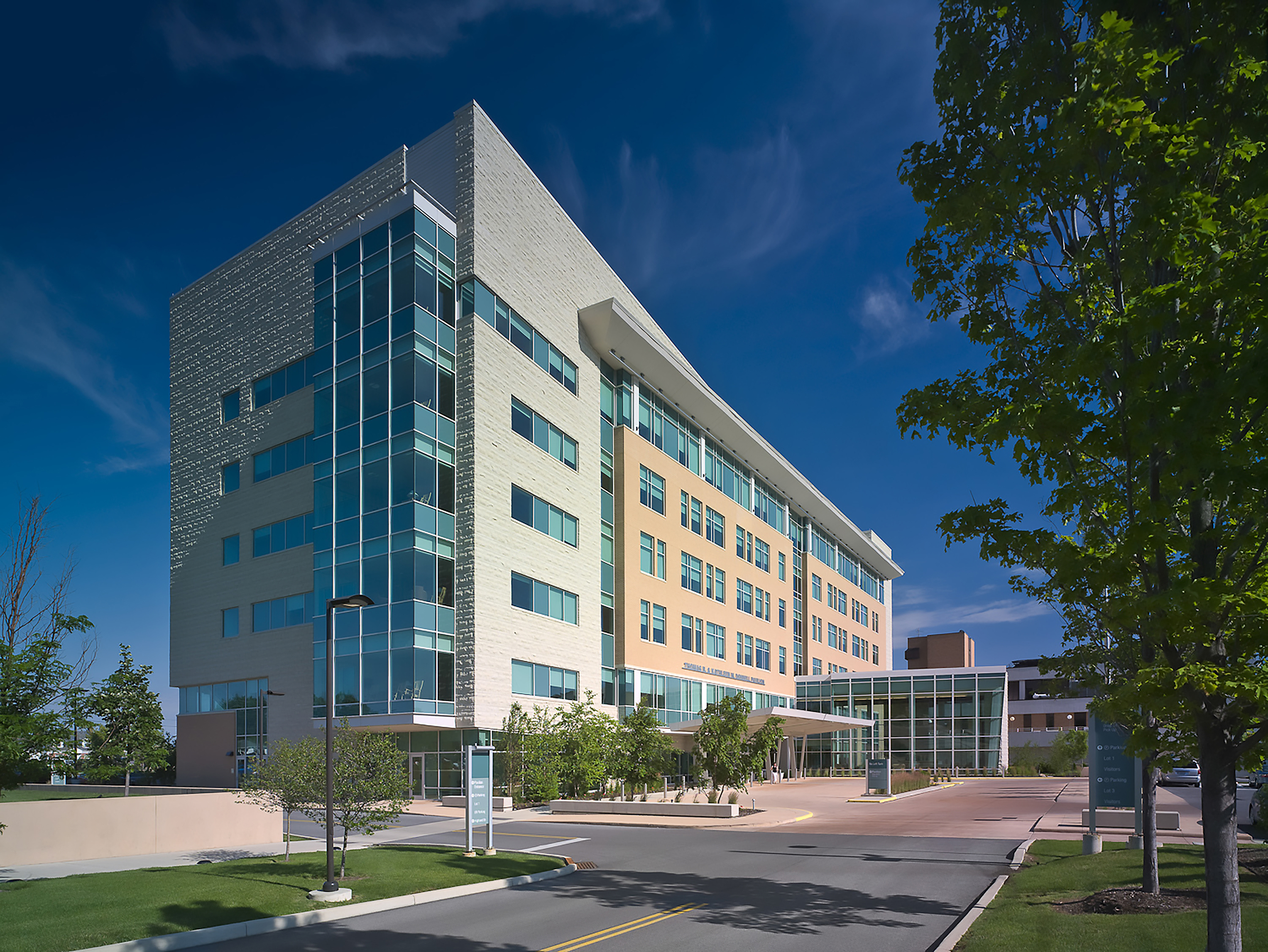
- The Donnell Patient Pavilion at BVH

Geography
- Location: 1900 S. Main St. Findlay, 45840, Northwest Ohio, Ohio, United States

Organization
- Type: Non-profit

Services
- Beds: 150

History
- Founded: Findlay in 1891

Links
- Website: www.bvhealthsystem.org
- Lists: Hospitals in Ohio

Blanchard Valley Health System (BVHS) is a non-profit, integrated regional health system based in Findlay, a city in Ohio. BVHS is one of the largest employers in its micropolitan area, employing more than 3000 people.

BVHS serves an eight-county area that includes Allen, Hancock, Hardin, Henry, Putnam, Seneca, Wood and Wyandot counties in Ohio.

In addition, a dedicated group of more than 400 volunteers support BVHS through their contributions.

== History ==
BVHS has a long history of service to Findlay and the surrounding area.

Blanchard Valley Hospital, the anchor subsidiary of BVHS, was founded in 1891 as the Findlay Home for Friendless Women and Children.

Bluffton Hospital was founded in 1908 by Dr. J. J. Suter.

The two hospitals merged in 1995 to create the Blanchard Valley Regional Health Center and later, the Blanchard Valley Health Association (BVHA). In 2007, BVHA changed its name to Blanchard Valley Health System.

Both Blanchard Valley Hospital and Bluffton Hospital are members of the Ohio Hospital Association.

In addition to Blanchard Valley Hospital and Bluffton Hospital, BVHS also operates the Jack Schaefer Retirement Community (which includes Birchaven Village, Birchaven Estates, and Birchaven Heights), Bridge Home Health & Hospice, The Armes Family Cancer Care Center, Physicians Plus Urgent Care, Daniel J. and Maria H. Sak Sleep Wellness Center, Wound Care Solutions, Heminger Heart and Vascular Center, Caughman Health Center, EasternWoods Outpatient Center, Wellness Park Medical Campus, and several other health-related businesses in northwest Ohio.

== Health services ==
- Behavioral Health
- Cancer Care
- Cardiology
- Diabetes Care
- Dialysis
- Emergency/Trauma
- Home Health
- Hospice
- Imaging/Radiology
- Laboratory Services
- Minimally Invasive Surgery
- Orthopedics
- Pain Treatment
- Pediatrics
- Podiatry
- Pharmacy
- Physician Referral Service
- Rehabilitation
- Robotic Surgery
- Senior Living
- Sleep Disorders
- Special Care Nursery
- Urgent Care
- Women's Health
- Wound Care

== Digital transformation and clinical informatics ==
BVHS has expanded its leadership and investment in digital health and health informatics. In 2023, the health system appointed Gulshan Mehta as chief digital and information officer (CDIO), with responsibility for digital strategy, data analytics, information technology services, and cybersecurity.

The health system has since pursued a broader digital transformation strategy involving clinical applications, data and analytics, artificial intelligence and automation, cybersecurity, and improvements to digital patient access. In 2025, BVHS expanded online scheduling for primary care as part of this digital strategy.

In 2026, BVHS began a national search for a chief medical information officer (CMIO) to provide physician leadership for clinical informatics. The position is responsible for clinical information-system optimization, clinical informatics and artificial intelligence governance, physician engagement, and the alignment of technology with clinical operations.
