= Southwest General Health Center =

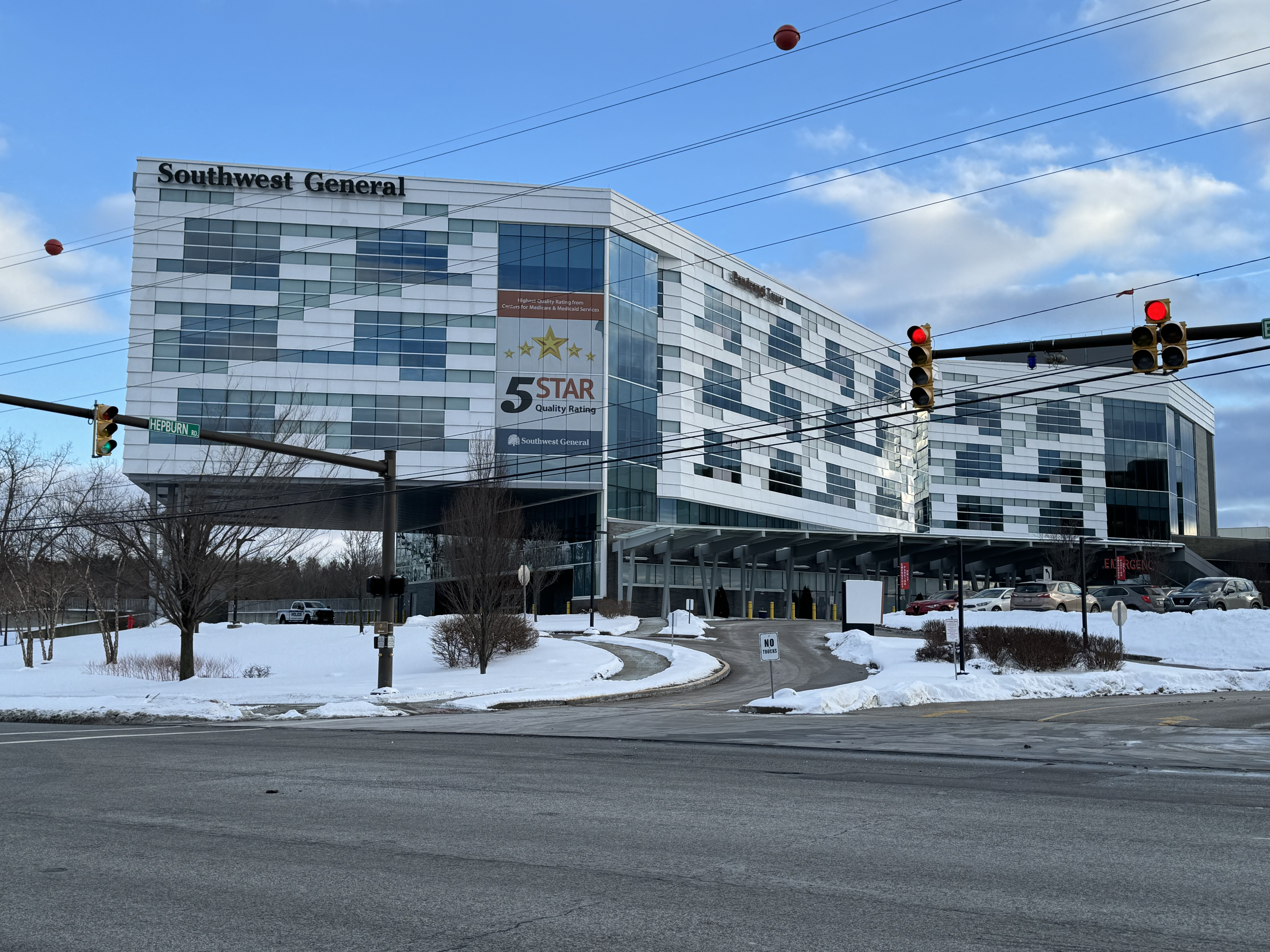

Geography
- Location: Middleburg Heights, Cuyahoga County, Ohio, United States
- Coordinates: 41°22′14″N 81°49′56″W

Organization
- Care system: Medicaid, Private Insurance, BCMH
- Type: General

Services
- Emergency department: Level III trauma center
- Beds: 354

History
- Founded: 1920

Links
- Website: www.swgeneral.com
- Lists: Hospitals in Ohio

Southwest General Health Center is a 354-bed hospital located in Middleburg Heights, Ohio. It is partnered with University Hospitals of Cleveland. Southwest General Health Center is certified as a Level III Trauma Center and a Primary Stroke Center.

== History ==
=== Facilities ===
Southwest General Health Center was founded in 1920 as The Community Hospital. A flu epidemic in 1920 resulted in many deaths of patients while being transported to the nearest hospital in nearby Cleveland. Citizens of several southwestern Cleveland communities responded by raising $100,000 in only 10 days to build a local community hospital in Berea, Ohio.

After several expansions and a name change to Southwest General Hospital, the current site ran out of room to expand. In 1973 the local communities of Berea, Brook Park, Olmsted Falls, Olmsted Township, Strongsville, and Middleburg Heights passed tax levies to support the building of a new 235-bed facility nearly a mile down the road from the original location in Middleburg Heights. This new facility went through several expansions in 1983, 1994, 2000, and 2006, putting the facility at its current capacity of 354 beds.

In 1994, Southwest General Hospital changed its name to Southwest General Health Center to reflect its practices of preventative health care as well as remaining a primary care hospital.

=== The Old Oak ===
The new facility built from 1973 to 1975 was built on a large 22-acre (89,000 m^{2}) plot of land next to the Cuyahoga County Fairgrounds. This site had several old White Oak trees, one of which was more than 200 years old. This 200+ year old tree was left in place near the entrance of the new facility, and quickly became a symbol for the hospital. In 1995, after several attempts to save the tree from disease, the Old Oak was removed due to safety concerns. Several new White Oak trees have been planted, along with a seedling from the Old Oak in the tree's original location.

The Old Oak has been a part of the Southwest logo since its move to the current location. Several of the nearby businesses and facilities are named after the Old Oak, as well as Old Oak Boulevard, which borders the west side of the hospital.

=== 2013 Expansion ===
In 2013, Southwest General started construction on a $124 million expansion to the facility. The new expansion includes a 40,000 square foot emergency department, a 24-bed Critical Care Unit, a 250 car underground parking structure, and a new patient bed tower that added 96 private patient rooms to the facility. The emergency department opened in January 2014, and the Critical Care Unit opened three months later. The entire expansion project was completed in 2015.

== Partnering With University Hospitals ==
In 1997, Southwest General entered into a partnering agreement with University Hospitals; the agreement made Southwest General the flagship hospital for UH on Cleveland's West Side. Through this partnership, Southwest General offers its communities local access to several of the specialty services offered by UH and their facilities.

=== Ireland Cancer Center ===
Southwest General built an addition to house their own branch of University Hospitals Ireland Cancer Center. This center is designated as a Comprehensive Cancer Center by the National Cancer Institute. This allows Southwest General to offer cancer treatment on-site, as well as providing access to clinical trials.
