= Cleveland Clinic Hillcrest Hospital =

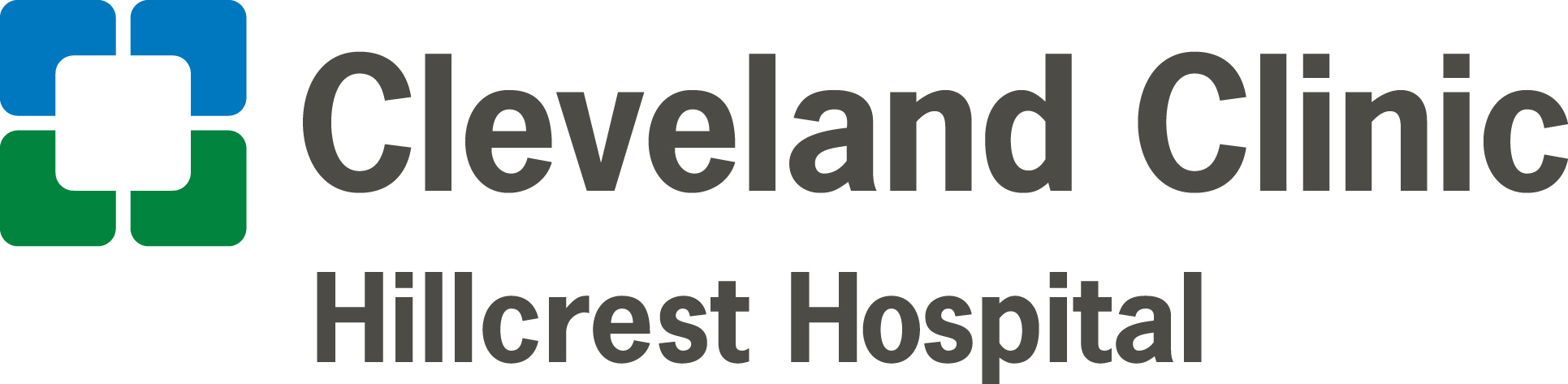

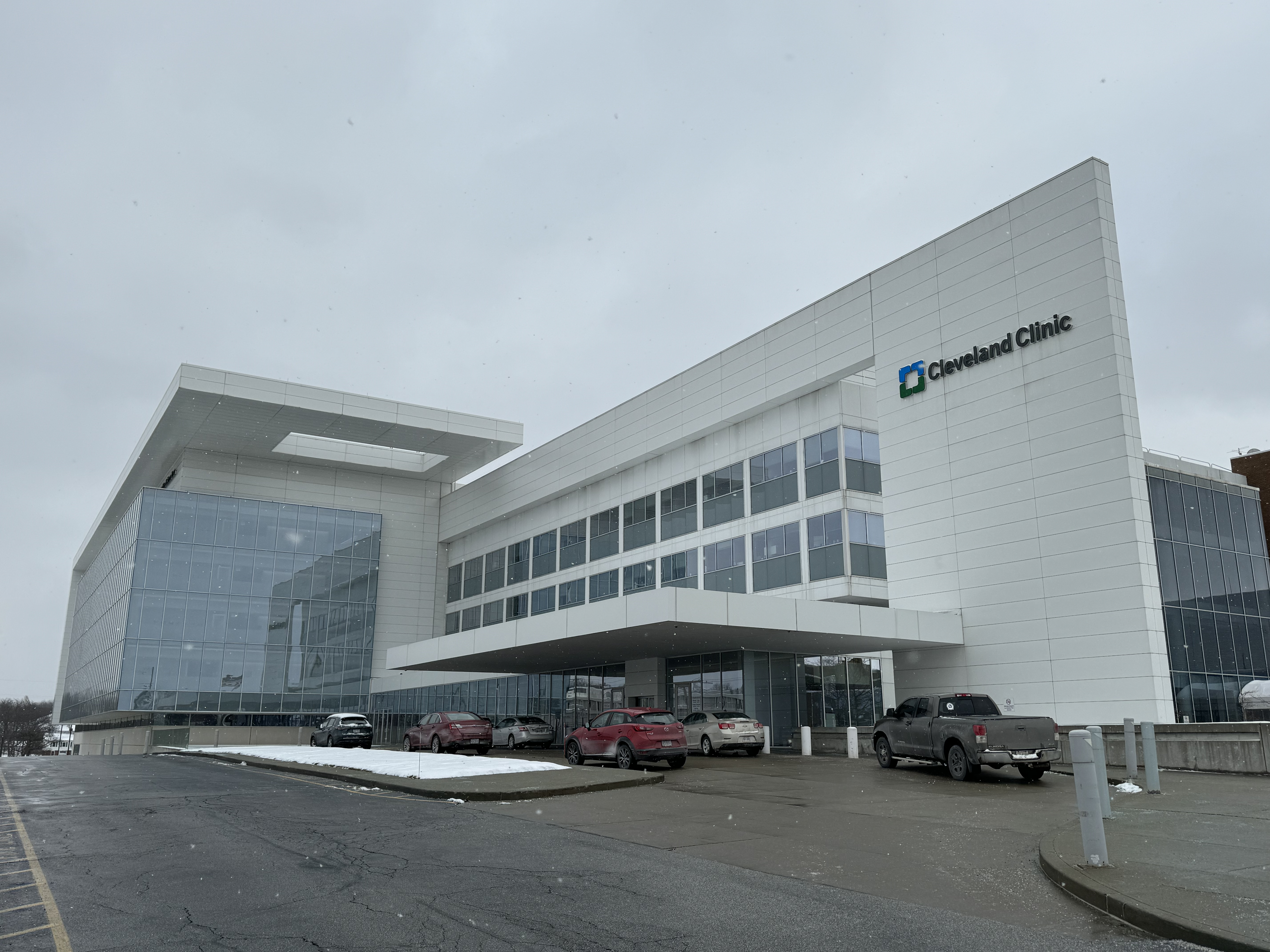

Geography
- Location: 6780 Mayfield Road, Mayfield Heights, Ohio, United States
- Coordinates: 41.51924°N 81.43458°W

Services
- Emergency department: Level II trauma center
- Beds: 500

Helipads
- Helipad: FAA LID: OI83

History
- Founded: 1968

Links
- Website: www.hillcresthospital.org
- Lists: Hospitals in Ohio

Cleveland Clinic Hillcrest Hospital is a comprehensive-care hospital on Mayfield Road in Mayfield Heights, Ohio, United States. It is part of the Cleveland Clinic Health System. The hospital currently has 500 registered beds, and serves as a level II trauma center for eastern Cuyahoga, Geauga, Lake, and Portage counties.

== History ==
Hillcrest Hospital has its roots with Doctors Hospital. Doctors Hospital was founded in Cleveland Heights by physicians of the Academy of Medicine of Cleveland. They purchased the Edgehill Apartment building at Cedar Road and Edgehill Boulevard and converted it to a hospital, which opened in August 1946. In 1968, the City of Cleveland Heights purchased and demolished the hospital for a planned parking lot and fire station. In 1966, Doctors Hospital accepted a donation of land from Cleveland developer Dominic Visconsi and ground was broken for Hillcrest Hospital. On November 23, 1968, the new Hillcrest Hospital opened for its first patients.

In 1984, Hillcrest Hospital, Huron Road Hospital, Euclid Hospital, and Suburban (now South Pointe Hospital) formed the Meridia Health System, a networked hospital system. In 1997, the hospitals became part of the Cleveland Clinic Health System.

In 1994, the hospital finished an expansion, increasing outpatient services and adding an on-campus medical office building. In the summer of 2005, construction was completed on the West Tower, adding 104 bed spaces, as well as two new operating rooms, an endovascular suite for minimally-invasive vascular procedures, and an expanded William B. Hirsch Cancer Center. This expanded center offers a full range of care, featuring Cleveland Clinic radiation oncologists and gynecological cancer care and treatment. In November 2010, $163 million renovation and addition was finished, which included the construction of the five-story Jane and Lee Seidman Tower.

In 2021, Hillcrest Hospital broke ground on the Lozick Cancer Pavilion, a 10,600 square-foot addition to the existing cancer center.

In 2024, Newsweek named Hillcrest Hospital one of the 10 Best Hospitals in Ohio.
