= Chief medical informatics officer =

Health care executive

A chief medical informatics officer (CMIO), also known as a chief medical information officer, is a c-suite senior healthcare executive, typically a physician, who provides clinical leadership for an organization's use of information technology, data, and digital health systems. The CMIO serves as a link between clinical practice, health informatics, information technology, and organizational leadership, helping ensure that technology supports safe, efficient, and effective patient care.

The position combines expertise in medicine, informatics, technology, and organizational leadership. CMIOs commonly participate in decisions concerning electronic health records, clinical software, data analytics, digital health, and other technologies used in patient care. They may also help determine how major clinical technologies are selected, implemented, governed, and improved.

The role requires a relatively uncommon combination of clinical, technical, and leadership skills. Healthcare organizations have reported challenges in recruiting, retaining, and developing experienced physician informatics leaders.

== Role and responsibilities ==
The responsibilities of a CMIO extend beyond the management of electronic health record systems. Depending on the organization, the role may include responsibility for clinical technology strategy, patient safety, quality improvement, clinical workflow, analytics, and digital transformation.

Common responsibilities include:

- Clinical and digital strategy: Advising organizational leaders on the development, selection, implementation, and evaluation of clinical technologies and ensuring that technology investments support clinical and organizational priorities.
- Electronic health records and clinical systems: Providing clinical leadership for the design, implementation, optimization, and governance of electronic health records and related systems used by physicians, nurses, pharmacists, and other healthcare professionals.
- Patient safety: Evaluating the effects of technology on clinical care and identifying ways in which system design may contribute to errors, delays, or other patient-safety risks.
- Clinical workflow: Assessing how information systems affect clinical work and helping redesign technology and processes to improve efficiency and usability.
- Clinical decision support: Overseeing the development and evaluation of systems that provide clinicians with alerts, recommendations, reminders, risk assessments, and other decision-support tools.
- Data and quality improvement: Using clinical data and analytics to measure performance, improve quality, support research, and contribute to population health initiatives.
- Leadership and change management: Coordinating physicians, nurses, administrators, technical teams, and executives during large-scale technology initiatives and serving as an intermediary between clinical and technical stakeholders.
- Artificial intelligence: Contributing to the evaluation, governance, and implementation of artificial intelligence and machine-learning technologies in healthcare.

CMIOs may also address problems related to the exchange of information between different clinical systems. In a 2023 qualitative study of chief clinical information officers in NHS England, participants reported that poor interoperability between electronic health records could interfere with coordinated care, reduce clinical efficiency, and create patient-safety concerns.

== Qualifications and professional background ==
CMIOs are generally experienced physicians with additional expertise in clinical informatics, healthcare technology, data, or organizational leadership. The position requires an understanding of both clinical practice and information systems, as well as the ability to lead multidisciplinary teams and large-scale organizational change.

Relevant competencies may include clinical workflow analysis, data analytics, information-system governance, project management, quality improvement, communication, and strategic planning.

An American Medical Informatics Association (AMIA) task force identified a broad set of knowledge and skill requirements for senior clinical informatics leaders, including CMIOs, and recommended structured education and continuing professional development for these positions.

In the United States, clinical informatics is a medical subspecialty recognized by the American Board of Medical Specialties. Physicians may complete two-year fellowships accredited by the Accreditation Council for Graduate Medical Education, with training in health information systems, clinical decision support, analytics, leadership, implementation, and healthcare operations. Board certification is offered through the American Board of Preventive Medicine and the American Board of Pathology.

Not all CMIOs follow the same educational pathway. Some enter the field through clinical informatics fellowships, while others develop expertise through graduate education, certificate programs, informatics leadership positions, or extensive experience in healthcare technology.

== Recruitment and leadership development ==
Recruitment and professional development have become important issues within the physician informatics workforce. A 2023 survey by the Association of Medical Directors of Information Systems (AMDIS) and executive search firm WittKieffer found that more than half of respondents reported challenges in recruiting, retaining, or developing members of their informatics teams.

Recruitment can be complicated by the combination of skills required for senior informatics positions. CMIOs may be expected to maintain clinical credibility while also demonstrating expertise in technology, data, organizational change, and executive leadership, creating a relatively specialized profile for prospective candidates.

Leadership succession has also been identified as a concern. In a 2025 AMDIS–WittKieffer survey, 21% of responding organizations reported having established succession plans for senior medical informatics positions, while 64% of physician informatics respondents indicated that they were considering changing roles or retiring.

== History and evolving scope ==
The CMIO role became increasingly common during the 1990s as healthcare organizations adopted more complex clinical information systems. The position expanded as hospitals moved from paper-based records toward electronic health records and computerized clinical systems.

In the United States, the 2009 Health Information Technology for Economic and Clinical Health Act encouraged widespread adoption of electronic health records and contributed to increased demand for physicians capable of leading clinical information-technology programs.

The scope of the CMIO has continued to broaden as digital technology has become more closely integrated with healthcare delivery. In addition to electronic health records, contemporary CMIOs may be involved in interoperability, telemedicine, mobile health, advanced analytics, predictive modeling, digital patient engagement, cybersecurity, and artificial intelligence.

In the 2025 AMDIS–WittKieffer survey of more than 160 physician informatics executives in the United States, 83% reported that their responsibilities had increased during the preceding two years. Artificial intelligence and machine learning were among the major areas of expanding responsibility.

== Organizational structure and related titles ==
The authority, responsibilities, and reporting relationships of CMIOs vary among healthcare organizations. A CMIO may report to the chief information officer, chief medical officer, chief executive officer, chief digital officer, or another senior executive. In some healthcare systems, the CMIO is part of the organization's senior clinical or technology leadership structure.

CMIOs typically work closely with leaders responsible for medicine, nursing, information technology, quality, operations, finance, and digital strategy.

In the United Kingdom, the related title chief clinical information officer (CCIO) is commonly used for senior clinical informatics leaders. Unlike the more physician-oriented CMIO title, CCIO positions may be held by physicians, nurses, pharmacists, and other clinical professionals.

== Compensation ==
Compensation for CMIOs varies by organization, geographic region, clinical responsibilities, and the scope of the position.

Among CMIO respondents to the 2025 AMDIS–WittKieffer survey in the United States, 83% reported annual base salaries above US$350,000, while 12% reported base salaries above US$500,000. In addition, 78% were eligible for annual incentive compensation, with some exceeding 30% of base salary.
