= Firelands Regional Medical Center =

Hospital in Sandusky, Ohio, US

Coordinates: 41.44528°N 082.71055°W

Firelands Health
- Firelands Health

Geography
- Location: (United States) , Sandusky, Ohio, USA

Organisation
- Care system: Non-Profit
- Type: General

Services
- Standards: AOA accreditation
- Beds: 287

Helipads
- Helipad: FAA LID: OI87

History
- Founded: 1876, 1902, 1985, 2001

Links
- Website: http://www.firelands.com/ Firelands Regional Medical Center
- Lists: Hospitals in Ohio
- Other links: List of hospitals in Ohio

Firelands Regional Medical Center (formerly known as Firelands Community Hospital) is a 287 bed not-for-profit medical center in Sandusky, Ohio, United States. The medical center had 9,678 admissions, 3,162 inpatient procedures, 7,704 outpatient surgeries, and its emergency department had 47,208 visits. Firelands Regional Medical Center is the only hospital in Erie County serving more than 10,000 inpatients and over 45,000 ER patients annually and is the largest year-round employer. The medical center is a level 3 trauma center and accredited by the American Osteopathic Association's Healthcare Facilities Accreditation Program.

== History ==
Today's Firelands Regional Medical Center is the combination of three former Sandusky hospitals into one regional medical center providing state-of-the-art medical care. It began with the laying of the cornerstone for the former Good Samaritan Hospital on June 27, 1876, followed by the Sisters of Charity of St. Augustine based in Cleveland founding Providence Hospital in 1902. In 1923, the Diocesan boundaries were redrawn and the Sisters of St. Francis of Sylvania, Ohio assumed sponsorship. In 1985, Good Samaritan Hospital and Sandusky Memorial Hospital merged, becoming Firelands Community Hospital. In 2001 Firelands Community Hospital and Providence Hospital merged to become Firelands Regional Medical Center – the largest health system in the five county area.

== School of Nursing ==
The Firelands Regional Medical Center School of Nursing is fully accredited and located on hospital property. Ownership transferred to the hospital in 2001.

== Rankings and achievements ==
In 2009, Firelands Regional Medical Center was listed as one of the 100 Best Places to Work in Healthcare.

The American College of Radiology designated Firelands Regional Medical Center as a Breast Imaging Center of Excellence.

In 2009, HealthGrades awarded Firelands Regional Medical Center the Vascular Surgery Excellence Award which has been awarded to only 52 of the approximately 5000 hospitals evaluated.
