= Henry County Hospital =

Coordinates: 41.4111775°N 84.087543°W

Geography
- Location: Napoleon, Ohio, United States

Organization
- Care system: Hospital Council of Northwest Ohio

Services
- Emergency department: Yes
- Beds: 25

Helipads
- Helipad: FAA LID: OH06

History
- Founded: 1982

Links
- Website: www.henrycountyhospital.org
- Lists: Hospitals in Ohio

Henry County Hospital is a critical access hospital serving Henry County, Ohio, United States.

== Facilities ==
The hospital is equipped with an emergency department, an oncology treatment center, and a helipad for medical evacuation.

U.S. News & World Report had collated the following statistics:

Emergency Visits:	9718
Admissions:	774
Inpatient Surgeries:	118
Outpatient Surgeries:	857

== History ==
It was opened in 1982 to replace the previous S.M. Heller Memorial Hospital, which operated from 1919 to 1982.

In early 2015 Henry County Hospital formed the Vantage Healthcare of Ohio, LLC collaborative with seven other hospitals from Northwest Ohio as a means to pool resources and overall save money.

== Accreditation ==
Henry County Hospital is accredited by DNV-GL Healthcare, and the hospital's laboratory is accredited by The Joint Commission.
