= Federal Office of Rural Health Policy =

The Federal Office of Rural Health Policy (FORHP) is a part of the Health Resources and Services Administration (HRSA), of the United States Department of Health and Human Services (HHS).

== Programs ==
HRSA is the lead federal agency responsible for monitoring and improving historically scarce health care services for 60 million people living in rural areas. In financial year 2008, HRSA invested $175 million to improve health care in rural America, where access to medical services is often limited. FORHP is the lead office for coordinating and carrying out these grant activities, which help fund Critical Access Hospitals and other rural hospitals, community health centers, rural health clinics, and other rural providers of health care.

In addition, the office serves as a "policy voice" within HHS to ensure that regulatory actions take into account the special conditions faced by rural health care providers. The Director of FORHP is currently Tom Morris, who succeeded Marcia Brand in 2008.

=== Assisting states ===
HRSA funds state-run Offices of Rural Health in each of the 50 states to collect and disseminate health-related information about rural areas, provide technical assistance to rural providers and hospitals, and work with communities to recruit and retain health providers. In addition, FORHP provides technical assistance and funding to state rural health associations through a partnership with the National Rural Health Association.

=== Rural grant programs ===
Through the Outreach and Network Development grant programs, HRSA funds improve the delivery of rural health care by encouraging greater collaboration and the creation of networks among local health care providers. Agency funds also strengthen "Critical Access Hospitals," small rural institutions that serve as key access points for Medicare beneficiaries. Other grants help rural hospitals and clinics acquire computer file-sharing systems and telemedicine equipment, which allows physician-to-physician and doctor-patient consultations over great distances.

HRSA also administers the Black Lung Clinic program, which provides treatment and rehabilitation for people who have occupation-related respiratory and pulmonary disease, and the Radiation Exposure Screening and Education Program, whose grantees educate, screen and refer for treatment people who were harmed by above-ground nuclear tests in the Southwest in the mid-20th century or by the mining, milling or transport of uranium.

=== Conducting research ===
HRSA supports rural health research centers to conduct short and long-term studies on rural health issues. The centers study critical trends facing rural communities in their quest to secure adequate, affordable, high-quality health services for their residents. The centers' research findings inform a wide audience of national, state and local decision-makers concerned with rural health.

=== Technical assistance ===
HRSA offers technical assistance to more than 4,000 rural health clinics. Through quarterly conference calls, HRSA helps these small ambulatory clinics react to regulatory and market changes in health care. The agency also supports the Rural Recruitment and Retention Network, which helps locate qualified health care professionals to work in rural communities.

=== Rural Health Information Hub ===
HRSA oversees services provided by the University of North Dakota's Rural Health Information Hub – formerly the Rural Assistance Center. RHIhub serves as an "information portal" to help rural communities and other rural stakeholders access the full range of available health care programs, funding and research.

=== Regional commissions ===
HRSA works with the Appalachian Regional Commission, the Delta Regional Authority, the Denali Commission, and the U.S.-Mexico Border Health Commission to improve service delivery and reduce health disparities.

Two programs, the Delta States Rural Development Network Grant Program and the Delta Rural Hospital Improvement Project, target resources to improve health care in the Mississippi Delta.

=== Border health ===
FORHP manages HRSA's Border Health Activities. Much of the U.S.-Mexico border is rural, and the few urban areas located on the border often face challenges similar to those affecting rural communities, such as ensuring an adequate workforce, infrastructure development and improving poor health outcomes. Lessons learned on the U.S.-Mexico border may provide insight to communities everywhere that seek to improve services amid changing demographics and forecasts of long-term health workforce shortages nationwide.

Activities as part of this initiative have included expanding Community Health Centers sites to additional communities (there are now 31 in the border region), funding a technical assistance website on border health issues on the Rural Assistance Center website, and providing support funding for the National Rural Health Association's Border Health Initiative that is working to find policy challenges to provide care along the border.

== History ==
Congress created the FORHP in 1987 and charged HRSA with advising the HHS Secretary on health care matters affecting rural hospitals, coordinating activities that related to rural health care, and maintaining a national information clearinghouse for state governments, federal policymakers, and providers. Congress was concerned that the proceeding decades had seen many rural hospitals close and that there was a lack of coordination within the Federal Government for rural health activities.
