= Kettering Health =

Faith-based hospital network in western Ohio, US

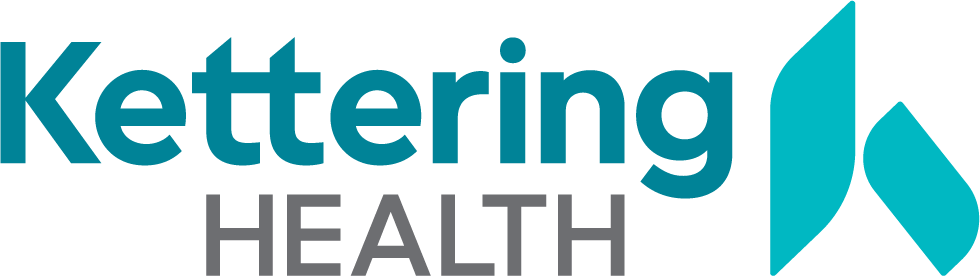
- Formerly: Kettering Health Network (KHN)
- Type: Nonprofit organization
- Founded: 1999
- Headquarters: Kettering, Ohio, United States
- Area served: Ohio
- Key people: Michael Gentry
- Number of employees: 12,000
- Website: ketteringhealth.org

Kettering Health is a Seventh-day Adventist non-profit organization headquartered in Kettering, Ohio, that operates hospitals, stand-alone emergency departments, clinics and Kettering College. The network was formed following the merger of Kettering Medical Center and Grandview Medical Center in 1999. As part of the 2021 renaming of Kettering Health Network to Kettering Health, all of the hospitals in the network were renamed, with the exception of Soin. In addition, Kettering Physician Network was renamed Kettering Health Medical Group. Kettering Health has over 12,000 employees and 2,100 physicians.

== Hospitals ==
Kettering Health operates nine hospitals in the Southwest Ohio region.

Hospital name	Location	Former name	Ref.
Kettering Health Main Campus	Kettering	Kettering Medical Center	
Kettering Health Behavioral Medical Center	Miami Township	Kettering Health Behavioral Medicine Center	
Kettering Health Dayton	Dayton	Grandview Hospital and Medical Center	
Kettering Health Greene Memorial	Xenia	Greene Memorial Hospital	
Kettering Health Hamilton	Hamilton	Fort Hamilton Hospital	
Kettering Health Miamisburg	Miamisburg	Sycamore Medical Center	
Kettering Health Troy	Troy	Troy Hospital	
Kettering Health Washington Township	Washington Township	Southview Medical Center	
Soin Medical Center	Beavercreek		

== Financial Impropriety ==
In June of 2023, an Investigation by the Dayton Daily News uncovered documents that revealed abuse of funds committed by then CEO Fred Manchur. This investigation was conducted in the wake of anonymous complains that accused Manchur of using hospital funds for trips and to remodel his home. In addition, hospital funds were used for automobile expenses for former Chairman of the Kettering Health Board and former President of the Columbia Union Conference of Seventh-Day Adventism Dave Weigley. Hospital funds were also abused by Manchur and Weigly when they paid the Ohio Conference of Seventh-Day Adventists to relocate their headquarters from Mt. Vernon to Dayton. The Dayton Daily News mentions the abused funds were used for “other things,” as well but does not elaborate.

Weeks before Manchur bought a $1 million historic Kettering home in May 2008, Kettering Medical Center agreed to buy the house pending board approval, according to a purchase agreement signed by then-Chief Financial Officer Russ Wetherell.

Manchur was president of Kettering Medical Center when he and his wife purchased the house at 3500 Stonebridge Road for $1 million on May 16, 2008. The seller also gave the Manchurs $43,361 for repairs.

Manchur retired at the end of December 2022 and Weigley left the Kettering Health board in January 2023. A number of other executives also left Kettering Health in late 2022.

When the Dayton Daily News attempted to contact Manchur and Weigley in late 2023 they were unable to be reached for comment.

On January 18, 2026 the Dayton Daily News wrote an article exposing more information regarding updated tax filings. According to the article, executives and Adventist church leaders received $3.2 Million in improper benefits. These benefits include, a $12,124 whale watching trip in Maui, a $21,250 spa retreat, thousands of dollars of decorations for the Manchurs’ private home, travel and lodging in Europe and Hawaii, and thousands of dollars in personal gifts. Once again the Manchurs could not be reached for comment.

The hospital completed an internal investigation in 2023 and determined that it didn’t identify any individuals or dollar amounts. It said: “Individuals implicated in the investigation are no longer with the organization.” However, according to the tax records, several individuals who received benefits are still involved with either the hospital or the church.

Church leaders that received improper benefits include: Ron Halvorsen Jr, former SDA Ohio Conference president who received a total of $391,609 in economic benefits from the hospital, current president of the SDA Ohio Conference Bob Cundiff who along with his wife received a total of $84,069 in economic benefits, current treasurer of the Columbia Union Conference, Emmanuel Asiedu, received $23,584 in economic benefits from the hospital, current president of the Allegheny West Conference Marvin Brown reportedly received a total of $16,792 in economic benefits from the hospital, and Andrea Jakobsons the current head pastor of Kettering Seventh Day Adventist Church alongside several of her family members who were listed as receiving benefits totaling tens of thousands of dollars. These benefits include trips to Hawaii, car rentals, lodging, and domestic trips, among other inappropriate expenditures.

The hospital network reported to the IRS that most people paid the money back. Those who did not pay the money back were:

- Fred and Mary Kaye Manchur.
- Jarrod McNaughton, former president of Kettering Medical Center (now Kettering Health Main Campus) and executive vice president of Kettering Health, and his wife, Heidi McNaughton. They reportedly received $36,064 in excess benefits.
- Petra Moskalova, sister of Kettering Seventh-day Adventist Church pastor Andrea Jakobsons. She reportedly received $6,306 in benefits.
- Thomas Peebles, owner of Peebles Homes and listed as a community volunteer on previous tax forms. He reportedly received $3,172 in benefits.

== See also ==
- Kettering College
- List of hospitals in Ohio
- List of Seventh-day Adventist hospitals
