= Bayshore (shopping mall) =

Coordinates: 43.122160°N 87.914461°W

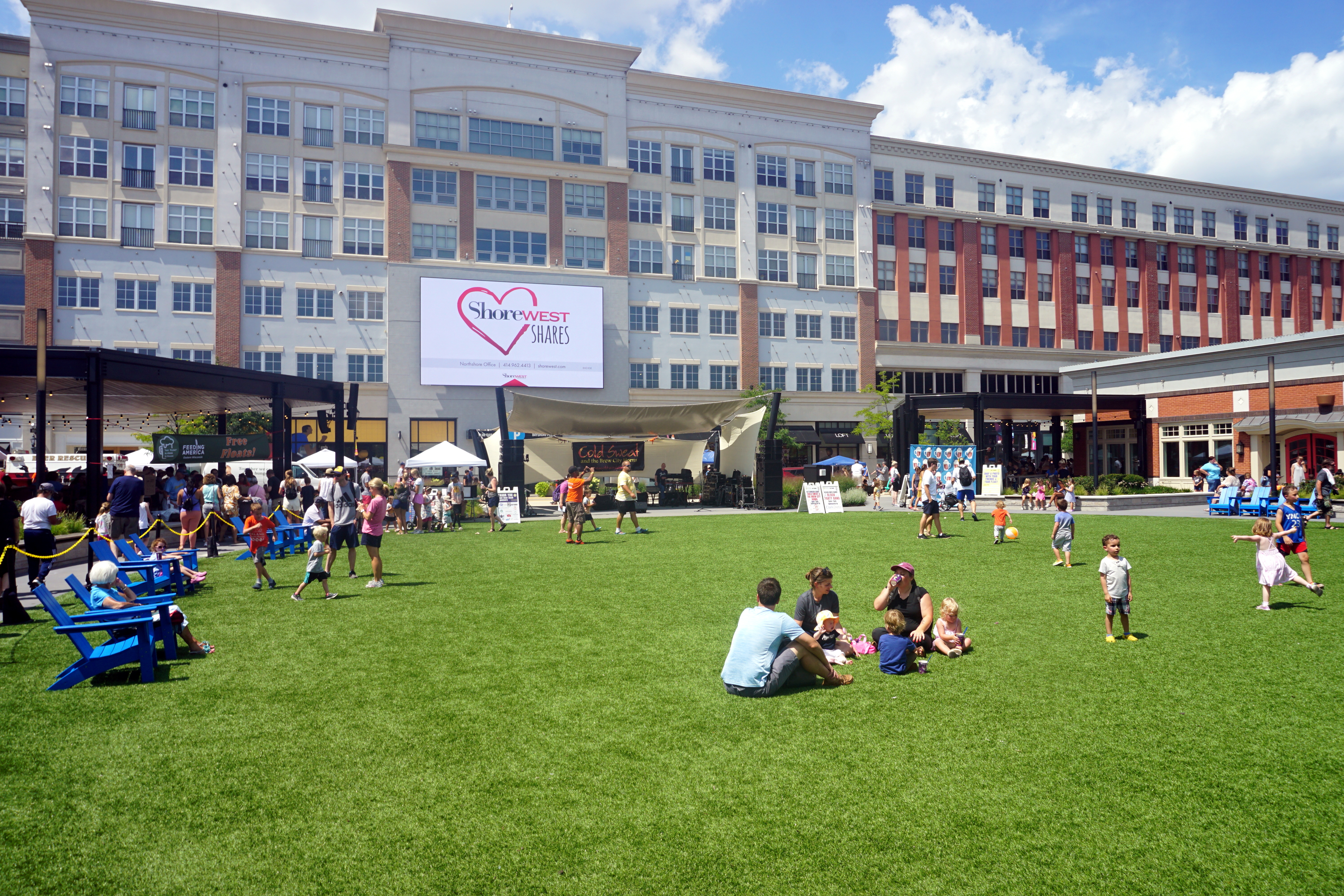
- 2022 Sprecher Root Beer Bash at Bayshore
- Location: Glendale, Wisconsin, United States
- Address: 5800 N Bayshore Drive Glendale, WI 53217
- Opened: 1954
- Developer: Steiner & Associates
- Manager: Bayshore Shopping Center JV LLC
- Owner: Cypress Equities
- Num. of stores: 85 plus
- Num. of anchor tenants: 5
- Floor area: 1,300,000 square feet (120,000 m^{2})
- Floors: 2
- Parking: 4,500 plus
- Public transit: Milwaukee County Transit System
- Website: https://thebayshorelife.com

Bayshore (formerly called Bayshore Mall and Bayshore Town Center) is an open-air shopping mall/mixed use complex including retail shops, restaurants, offices and residential units in Glendale, Wisconsin. It is currently anchored by Barnes & Noble, Kohl's, Total Wine & More, and Target along with one of the Milwaukee area's two Apple Stores. Originally an outdoor strip mall built in 1954, it was converted into an enclosed mall in 1974. The first of two major redevelopments began in 2006, Bayshore Town Center was redeveloped into a mixed use center. In February in preparation of the next redevelopment, some stores began to move to new locations in the mall.

== History ==
Plans for Bayshore began in 1951 and construction began in 1953.

On March 31, 1954, Bayshore Shopping Center opened with 38 stores. Sears opened in October of that year. Boston Store opened as the second anchor in 1958. T. A. Chapman Co opened as the third anchor in 1967.

In 1974, Bayshore was converted into an indoor mall with 500,000-square-feet of retail space which added many new stores including Kohl's as the fourth anchor. In 1989 the last T.A Chapman Co in Milwaukee closed.

In 2006, Bayshore went through a major redevelopment. 113 apartments, offices and green space were added. 1.3 million square feet of retail and restaurant space were also added. Sports Authority, iPic Theaters, and Barnes & Noble were added as anchors. Many new stores would move into Bayshore like Trader Joe's, California Pizza Kitchen, J.Crew, Apple, and The Cheesecake Factory. In 2010, Steiner & Associates would sell the mall to Olshan Properties LLC. Old Navy would move to the mall in 2015.

Bayshore would then struggle, losing 4 of its anchors between 2014 and 2018. In 2014, Sears closed and has been torn down. In 2016, Sports Authority closed. In 2016, Nordstrom Rack was slated to replace Sears but those plans were later cancelled. In March 2018, iPic Theaters closed its doors. In August 2018, Boston Store closed.

In 2018 the mall's management has proposed a "conversion of Glendale's troubled Bayshore Town Center, replacing the indoor mall with offices, a hotel and apartments."In September 2019 it was announced that Bayshore would begin a major redevelopment and redesign. The indoor portion of the mall was closed and demolished and construction has started on the apartments. An LED screen was added on one of the buildings. Since the redevelopment, many new stores have come to the mall. Total Wine & More would replace Sports Authority opening in 2020. Target would replace Boston Store opening in 2021.

In 2023 a parking garage in Bayshore Mall located on the west end collapsed. ACX Entertainment would replace IPic Theaters opening in November 2023.

== See also ==
- Easton Town Center
- Liberty Center
- The Greene Town Center
- Zona Rosa
