= The Greene Town Center =

Coordinates: 39.695°N 84.102°W

Greene Town Center
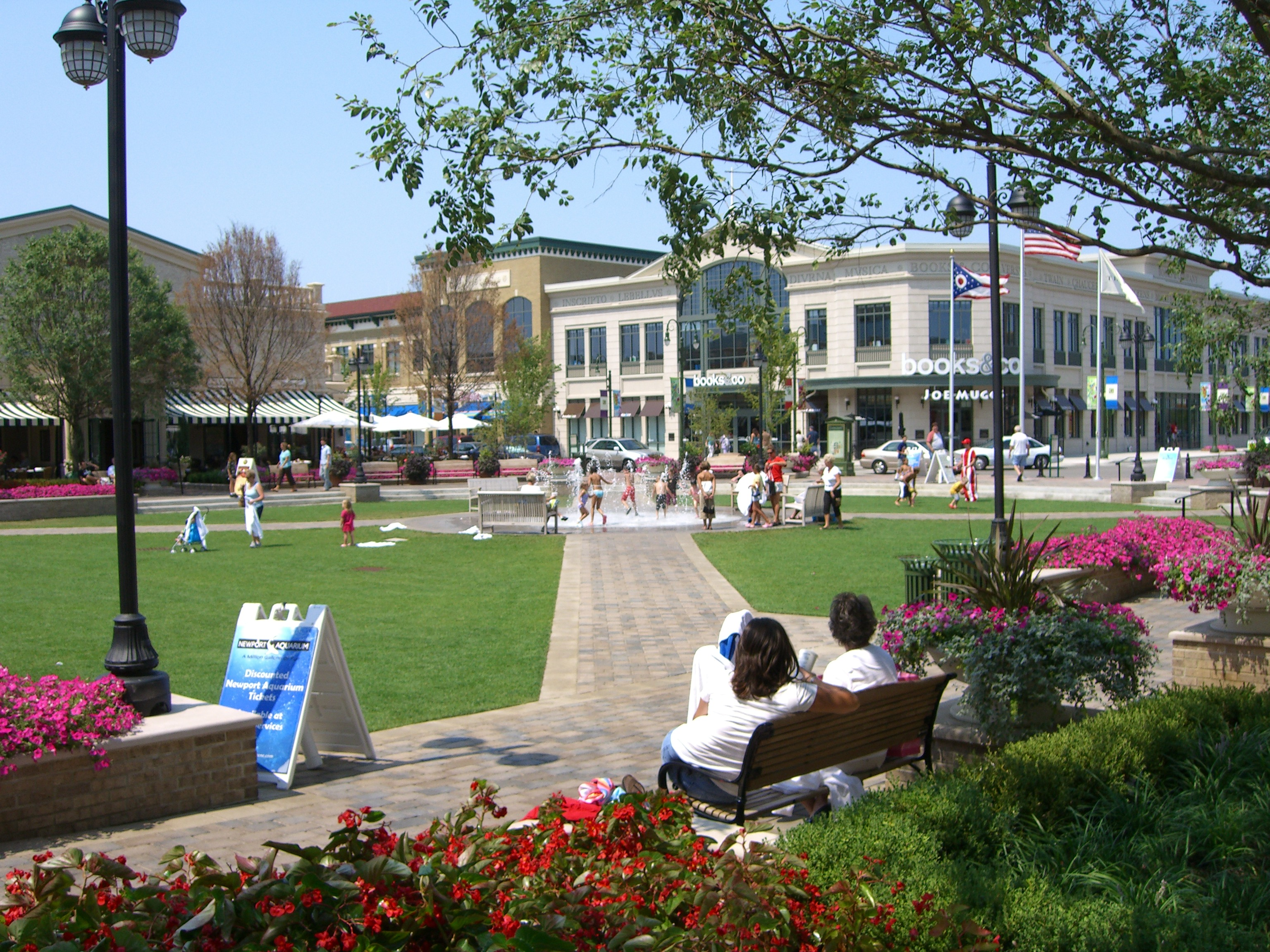
- The Greene Town Center, August 2007
- Location: Beavercreek, Ohio
- Opened: 2006
- Developer: Steiner and associates
- Num. of stores: 124
- Num. of anchor tenants: 3
- Floor area: 1.1 Million sq. ft.
- Parking: 6,600
- Public transit: RTA
- Website: http://www.thegreene.com/

The Greene Town Center (also known as The Greene) is a mixed-use development located in Beavercreek, Ohio (an eastern suburb of Dayton in Greene County).

The complex is an established mixed-use, office, retail, luxury living, dining and entertainment center and serves as the third major shopping mall in the Dayton region. The co-owner and developer, Steiner + Associates, is known for creating similar town centers such as the Easton Town Center in Columbus as well as other centers in the Cincinnati-Newport, Milwaukee and Kansas City regions.

== Development ==
The Greene was built in two phases over 72 acres (290,000 m^{2}) of land at a cost estimated exceed $200 million when complete. The developer provided the majority of the funding, but based on the $186 million estimate, the public's share is $14.8 million, or eight percent of the total cost. This is the lowest percentage bond financing in their portfolio. The location of the property is within the southeast boundaries of Indian Ripple and Stroop Roads, just off the exit to I-675.

Phase I was completed 2006. The first phase includes tenants such as Lane Bryant, White House Black Market, Cheesecake Factory, Chico's, Sephora, and numerous other retailers and/or restaurants, some new to the Dayton area. The architect of record for the majority of the project was Meachem and Apel.

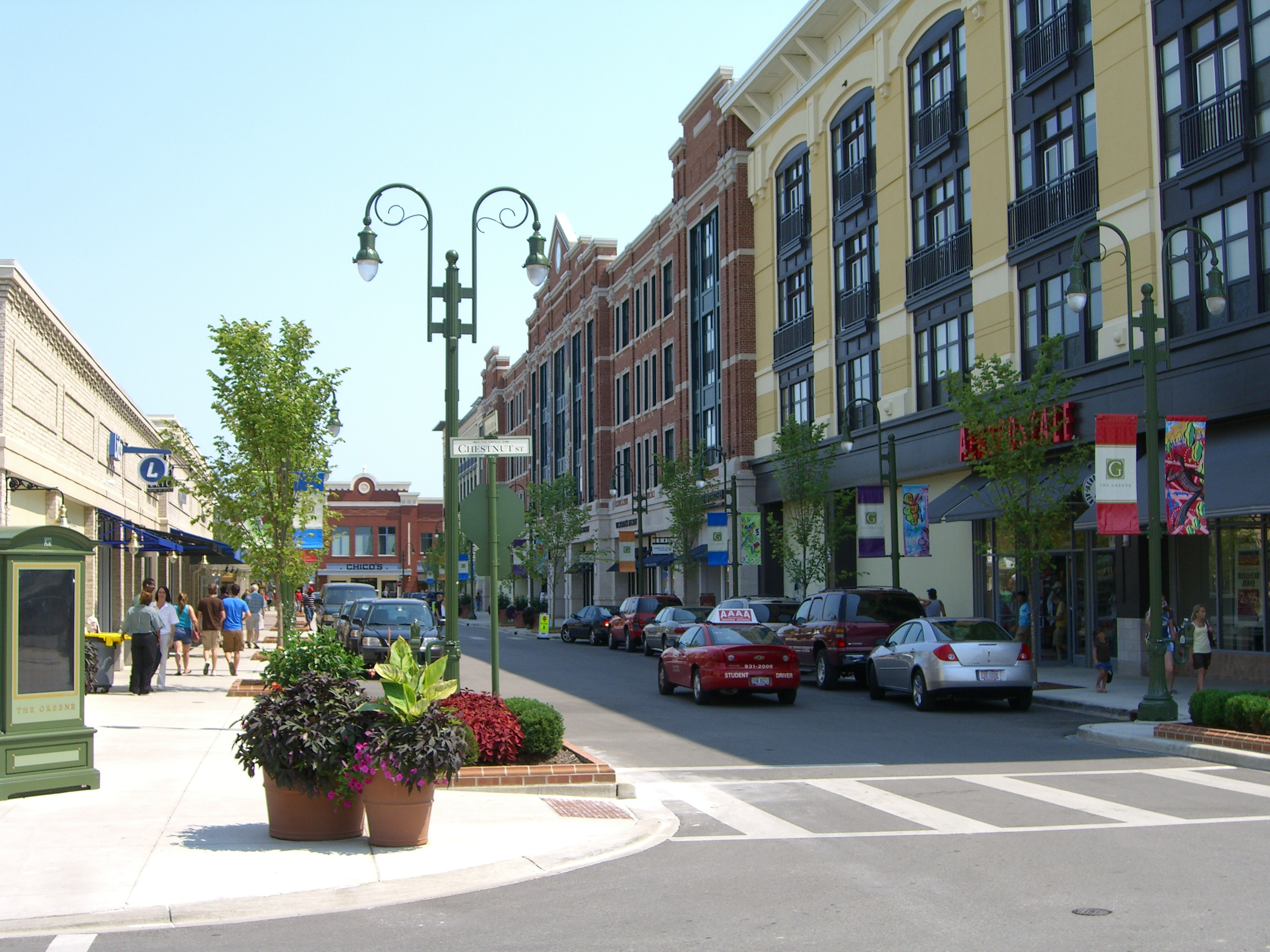
A view of The Greene

The development for Phase I also included: a comedy club (The Funny Bone), a fitness club (Urban Active), as well as an upscale movie theater (Rave Cinemas). Phase I also includes 100,000 square feet (9,300 m^{2}) of second-floor office space overlooking the town square and approximately 136 residential loft apartments. The mixed-use residential buildings were designed by Torti Gallas and Partners.

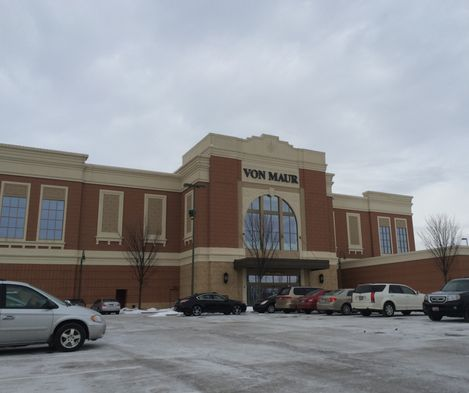
Von Maur Anchor Store

Phase II focused on fashion which include the anchor department store, Von Maur. Von Maur is sometimes described as the Nordstrom of the Midwest and features fashion, accessories and beauty products, but not furniture or other department store goods. Like Nordstrom, Von Maur is also known for a high degree of customer service, including handwritten notes from employees following purchases. Phase II was completed in fall 2008. Along with Von Maur, several other stores and shops have filled some vacant space in the complex. In 2014, The Greene announced it would construct a 35,000sq.ft. building for the national retailer Nordstrom Rack.

The environment of The Greene is that of a civic center which hosts outdoor concerts, holiday events and a family gathering space during both the summer and winter, in particular children playing in the main fountain during the summer. Research from other Steiner projects has evidenced that the number of visitors is essentially unaffected by seasonal weather. All metered parking benefits a charitable foundation. Parking in lots and garages is free.

The affluent areas of Beavercreek, Bellbrook, Kettering, Oakwood, Centerville, and Springboro are the core market for the shopping complex.

== Controversy ==
During construction, the shopping center was a controversial topic among people in the cities surrounding the development. The land was once a heavily wooded property and Beavercreek officials debated on the economic impact. Opponents also question if the area could support The Greene, The Mall at Fairfield Commons and the Dayton Mall.

== Security ==
The Greene has an age-restricted curfew of 9:00 p.m. every day. Persons under the age of 16 are not permitted on the premises of the center without an adult present.

== Tornado ==
On May 26, 2015, several stores within the area of The Greene and The Greene Crossing shopping centers were damaged by a brief EF1 tornado, which flipped cars and uprooted trees. Two individuals suffered minor injuries and a Kmart parking lot was evacuated. Ten cars were overturned in the parking lot of a Japanese restaurant and a Waffle House restaurant was also damaged. The tornado was part of a wider system that affected greater Dayton, Ohio area, downing trees and wires and damaging roofs. Video of the tornado was captured by security cameras of The Greene Town Center. The tornado was on the ground for approximately one minute and traveled half a mile. Winds reached speeds of over 100 MPH. As of the next morning, power was still out to several businesses affected by the tornado. A franchise of Fitworks, a gym with locations in Ohio and Kentucky, was reported as possibly having the most damage. The Waffle House had power, but remained closed due to damage to its roof.

== See also ==
- Zona Rosa (Kansas City)
- Newport on the Levee
- Easton Town Center
- Bayshore Town Center
- Liberty Center
- Santana Row
- The Mall at Fairfield Commons (also in Greene County)
