= Home Accents Today =

American home design trade magazine

- Type: business magazine
- Format: Print, digital and online trade magazine
- Owner: BridgeTower Media
- Founded: 1986
- Language: English
- Headquarters: Greensboro, North Carolina, USA
- ISSN: 1093-0337
- Website: Home Accents Today

Home Accents Today (ISSN 1093-0337) is a trade publication and web site owned by BridgeTower Media serving the information needs of designers, manufacturers, and buyers (retailers, e-tailers, interior designers) of home accents - decorative accessories, accent furniture, wall decor, mirrors, rugs, lamps, lighting, permanent botanicals, soft goods and tabletop.

Established in 1986, Home Accents Today national issue publishes monthly in print and digital formats. The magazine also publishes daily issues at the semiannual High Point, Las Vegas and Atlanta home furnishings markets. Regular features focus on new products, style trends, retail and interior design business operations and strategies, trade industry news and category reports.

The magazine also offers Best of Market editions as well as daily coverage updates via its website (homeaccentstoday.com), video content (PBM News Desk), and social media platforms.

Home Accents Today publishes exclusive research including consumer buying trends, store operations, the Home Accents "Universe" by product category, Retail Stars (showcasing independent brick and mortar retailers), and special reports on the home furnishings retail channels, technologies and best practices.

Former owner Reed Business Information sold Home Accents Today to Sandow Media, the publishers of Worth in 2010. Progressive Business Media purchased the company in 2013. Other Progressive Business Media titles included Furniture Today, Home & Textiles Today, Gifts and Decorative Accessories, Home Furnishings News, Casual Living and Kids Today. In 2018, BridgeTower Media acquired Progressive.
