= Crossroads (Cincinnati) =

Interdenominational church in Cincinnati, United States

- Crossroads Community Church
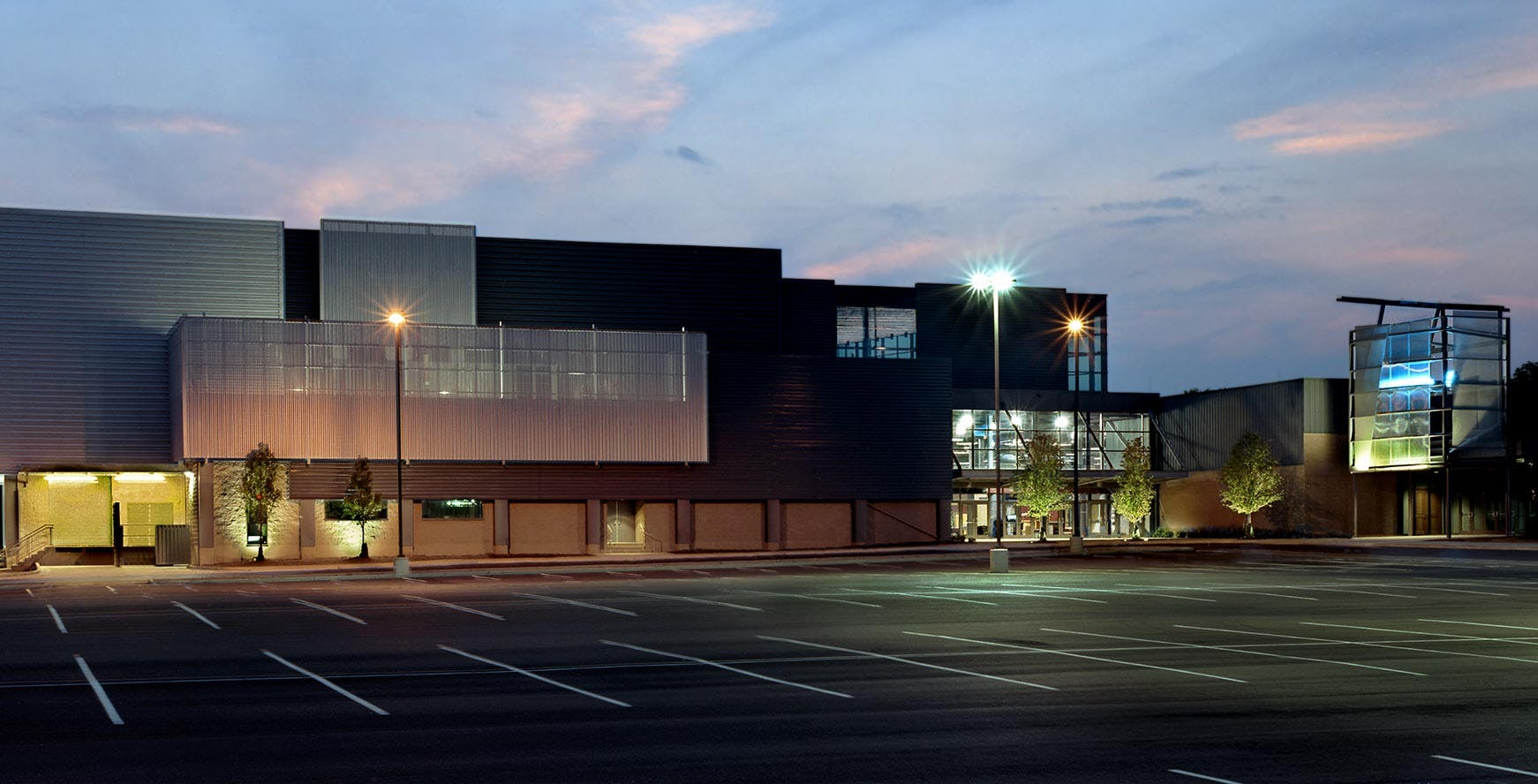
- Crossroads Oakley
- Location: 3500 Madison Road, Cincinnati, OH 45209
- Country: United States
- Denomination: Interdenominational
- Website: crossroads.net

History
- Founded: 1996

Clergy
- Pastor(s): Vicki Diller (Columbus), Andy Reider (Anywhere), Lena Schuler (East Side), Terry Phillps (Florence), John Gillispie (Lexington), Tim Senff (Mason), Greg McElfresh (Oakley), Matt Castleman (Dayton), Steve Tilling (West Side)

Crossroads is a multisite interdenominational megachurch in Cincinnati, Ohio, United States. Crossroads has nine physical locations in Ohio and Kentucky, and an online streaming platform.

== History ==
In 1990, Procter & Gamble brand managers Brian Wells, Jim Bechtold and Vivienne Bechtold started a singles Bible study in Hyde Park, Cincinnati. It quickly grew to over 100 people and they wondered if starting a church made sense.

After five years in a junior high auditorium and a growing attendance, senior leaders raised funds to purchase an empty supercenter. They renovated it into an auditorium seating 1,200. Megen Construction Company completed the construction a month ahead of schedule and within budget.

Champlin Architecture did the architecture for the first renovation with Megen Construction, and also did work for the second phase. Phase two expanded the auditorium, tripled the size of the childcare facility, and modernized the design. The new design is “raw, edgy, contemporary”.

It was named the 4th-largest and the fastest-growing church in America in 2017, with over 34,000 average weekend attendees. In November 2018, CBS News listed Crossroads as the 23rd largest megachurch in the United States with about 16,792 weekly visitors and thousands of viewers on its livestreamed services each week.

== Beliefs ==
The church is considered interdenominational, and some on staff refer to it as evangelical. The core beliefs draw from a variety of Christian denominations, and the church believes the Bible is the inspired word of God and the final authority on all matters of faith. The church is classified as Unclear: Non-Affirming with their LGBTQ policy, and Senior Pastor Brian Tome has indicated that homosexuality is a sin. The church also opposes abortion, supporting such local organizations as the Eve Center.

== Locations ==
Crossroads has seven of its own buildings, each with a campus pastor, including Crossroads' online location, Crossroads Anywhere. Crossroads also has a presence in six other cities, where people gather in rented spaces or homes.

List of Crossroads locations and cities:

- Columbus (Columbus, Ohio)
- Dayton (Dayton Mall in Miami Township, Montgomery County, Ohio)
- East Side (Eastgate, Ohio)
- Florence (Florence, Kentucky)
- Lexington (Lexington, Kentucky)
- Mason (Mason, Ohio)
- Oakley (Cincinnati, Ohio)
- Uptown/The George (Cincinnati, Ohio)
- West Side (Cleves, Ohio)
- anywhere (online)

As of August 2023, Crossroads has discontinued weekend services at their Uptown location. Crossroads Uptown has been reimagined as "The George" and turned into an event center, in hopes of making the location more enticing for outside bands, comedians, and acts to book for a live event.

On August 22, 2022, it was reported that Crossroads had purchased the former Sears location at the Dayton Mall in Miami Township, Montgomery County, near Miamisburg, intending to relocate Dayton-area services from Bellbrook Middle School and other rented facilities to the mall location. The reported size of the project is 166,760 sq ft (15,493 m^{2}). Construction began in February 2024, with completion estimated for the end of 2024 or early 2025. Crossroads Dayton, which includes a 1,589-seat auditorium, held its grand opening on Easter Sunday, April 20, 2025.

== Programs ==
In 2012, CityLink opened. CityLink is a center that offers specialized training to help people find jobs, manage finances, and improve literacy.

Undivided is a six-week program designed to encourage candid discussions about racial issues in small groups of people of different ethnicities. The initiative was launched out of the Crossroads Oakley campus and has grown across other Crossroads sites. As of June 2018, 3,000 people had gone through the program.

On June 12, 2018, the Undivided program received national attention when Crossroads Oakley's community pastor Chuck Mingo appeared on the front page of USA Today for his work launching the program.

A book about the Undivided program was published in 2024.

== Misconduct investigations ==
=== Brian Tome, founder and senior pastor of Crossroads in Oakley ===
In April 2026, Brian Tome was independently investigated by the church for allegations of inappropriate physical humor. The investigation corroborated the allegations, which dated back to a 2015 video.

Board chairman Brian Wells, in a pre-recorded video explaining the allegations, said this:

"Tome had kept a riding crop, which was a gift, in his office. In November 2015, a person entered Tome's office and asked about the crop. According to the person, Tome picked it up and said, 'Oh yeah. You like that?' Tome was accused of then whipping the person in the crotch and rubbing the person's crotch. The board said a third-party witness who was not previously known corroborated the claims."

— Brian Wells, board chairman

A representative of the church confirmed that Tome would not be investigated by police or face the possibility of criminal charges, he returned to Crossroads after serving one month suspension and subsequent leave of absence. The Crossroads Spiritual Board said in a statement:

"Our desire is that our community, whether as a staff member or volunteer, is one of accountability, truth and repentance that leads to redemption. As a result, Brian will be experiencing a one-month suspension followed by a four-month extended leave during which he will take part in appropriate steps of repentance and reconciliation. Brian’s response to these steps has been incredibly encouraging."

— Crossroads Spiritual Board

In a pre-recorded message explaining his perspective on the situation, Tome said this:

"It’s not fun. It’s not comfortable, not something I want to do, but I’m in and I’m going along with it. And Beam asked me to just share a little bit tonight from my perspective, and just so you know how I’m doing, I’m doing fine. And so this is just heart wrenching. It’s tough. It’s- yeah, it’s not good. And I’m thankful, thankful that the independent investigation is going to happen. I’m cooperating with it. I welcome it. The most important thing is we get to truth and we honor Jesus and the church in the midst of it. So I’m heartened by the steps that are being taken and wish I didn’t have to go through it, but I think the right things are happening under the direction of the board, and that’s me."

— Brian Tome, founder and senior pastor

=== Joel Firebaugh, former NextGen director and co-founder of Student Ministry Coach in Oakley ===
In February 2026, Joel Firebaugh was fired from Crossroads after police alleged he was secretly filming women who were working out without their consent at a local gym. Authorities told Crossroads the alleged recording took place at Crunch Fitness in Oakley, and that the investigation is ongoing with the Cincinnati Police Department. To ensure no one was filmed without their consent on church property, Pastor Brian Tome urged any congregants who have knowledge of misbehavior to notify the church as soon as possible.
