= One Way Furniture =

- Company type: Private
- Industry: E-commerce
- Founded: 2002
- Headquarters: Melville, New York, United States
- Key people: Mitchell Lieberman, Founder; President/CEO
- Products: Home & Office Furniture, Baby & Children's Furniture, Outdoor Furniture, etc.
- Revenue: USD$17 million (2010)
- Website: OneWayFurniture.com

One Way Furniture is a privately held American online retailer headquartered in Melville, New York. One Way focuses on home and office furniture and primarily services the United States and Canada.

== History ==
The company, started by Mitchell Lieberman in 2002, provides bar stool, bedroom, kitchen and dining, living room, accent, entertainment, children's, college, office, and outdoor furniture along with lighting and lamps. He was the first seller of new furniture on eBay. The online furniture company has been selling online since 1997 when the internet was not a typical place to buy furniture.

In 2011, the company's ranking in search results was greatly affected with the Google Panda update. Lieberman used freelance writers to rewrite his site's content to recover from the change. Also that year, One Way Furniture acquired EverythingFurniture.com.

One Way Furniture has ranked in the Inc. 5000 for five years (2006-2010) and was listed in the Internet Retailer Top 500 in 2007. The company has also ranked in the Top 20 Home Furnishings Retailers by Furniture Today.
