= Kettering Health Dayton =

Coordinates: 39.7699°N 84.2028°W

- Kettering Health
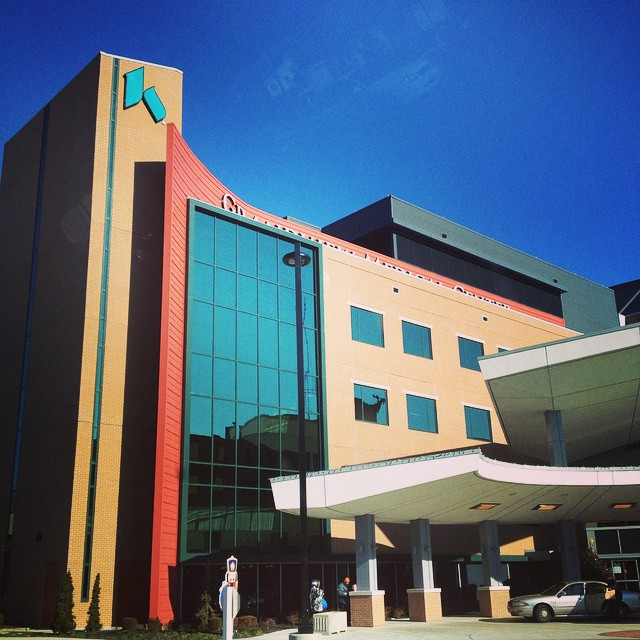

Geography
- Location: 405 W. Grand Ave., Dayton, Ohio, United States

Organization
- Care system: Private
- Type: Teaching

Services
- Beds: 344
- Speciality: Multispecialty

History
- Founded: 1926

Links
- Website: ketteringhealth.org/locations/kettering-health-dayton-mc002/
- Lists: Hospitals in Ohio

Kettering Health Dayton, formerly known as Grandview Medical Center, is a 344-bed teaching hospital located on the north side of Dayton, Ohio, United States, in the Five Oaks part of the larger area of Dayton View. Founded in 1926, Kettering Health Dayton is a part of the Kettering Health. It is also the parent hospital to Kettering Health Washington Township in Centerville, Ohio.

Kettering Health Dayton is one of the largest osteopathic teaching hospitals in the United States, operating several residency training and fellowship programs. The hospital is accredited by the Healthcare Facilities Accreditation Program (HFAP) and by the Commission on Accreditation of Rehabilitation Facilities (CARF). The last year data was made available, the hospital had 12,585 admissions, performed 2,777 inpatient surgeries and 17,481 outpatient surgeries, and its emergency department had 47,164 visits.

Kettering Health Dayton is one of the longest running and widely-known osteopathic training hospitals in the country. The community-based hospital has 11 residency programs and one fellowship. Overall, approximately 130 residents are in training at Kettering Health Dayton at any given time.

== History ==
In 1926, doctors Heber Dill, William Gravett and Frank Dilatush founded the Miami Clinic in a two-story house on West Second Street in Dayton to practice osteopathic medicine. The clinic was later renamed the Dayton Osteopathic Hospital. The hospital outgrew its space and in 1947, relocated to a new 65-bed location on Grand Avenue in Dayton. Although the hospital retained the legal name Dayton Osteopathic Hospital, it subsequently did business as Grandview Hospital and later, Grandview Medical Center. In 1999, the hospital merged with Kettering Medical Center to form a single network. In 2021, Grandview took the name Kettering Health Dayton.

=== Growth ===
According to the Dayton Business Journal in 2013, Grandview Medical Center, as it was known then, had 203 beds and employed over 1,200 people. By late 2015, the number of beds had risen to 344. The total number of people employed by Grandview was reported in 2019 to be 1,900.

== Recognition ==
Kettering Health Dayton was recognized by Healthgrades with its America's 250 Best Hospital Award from 2025 to 2026.

== See also ==
- List of Seventh-day Adventist hospitals
- List of hospitals in Ohio
