= Soin Medical Center =

- Kettering Health
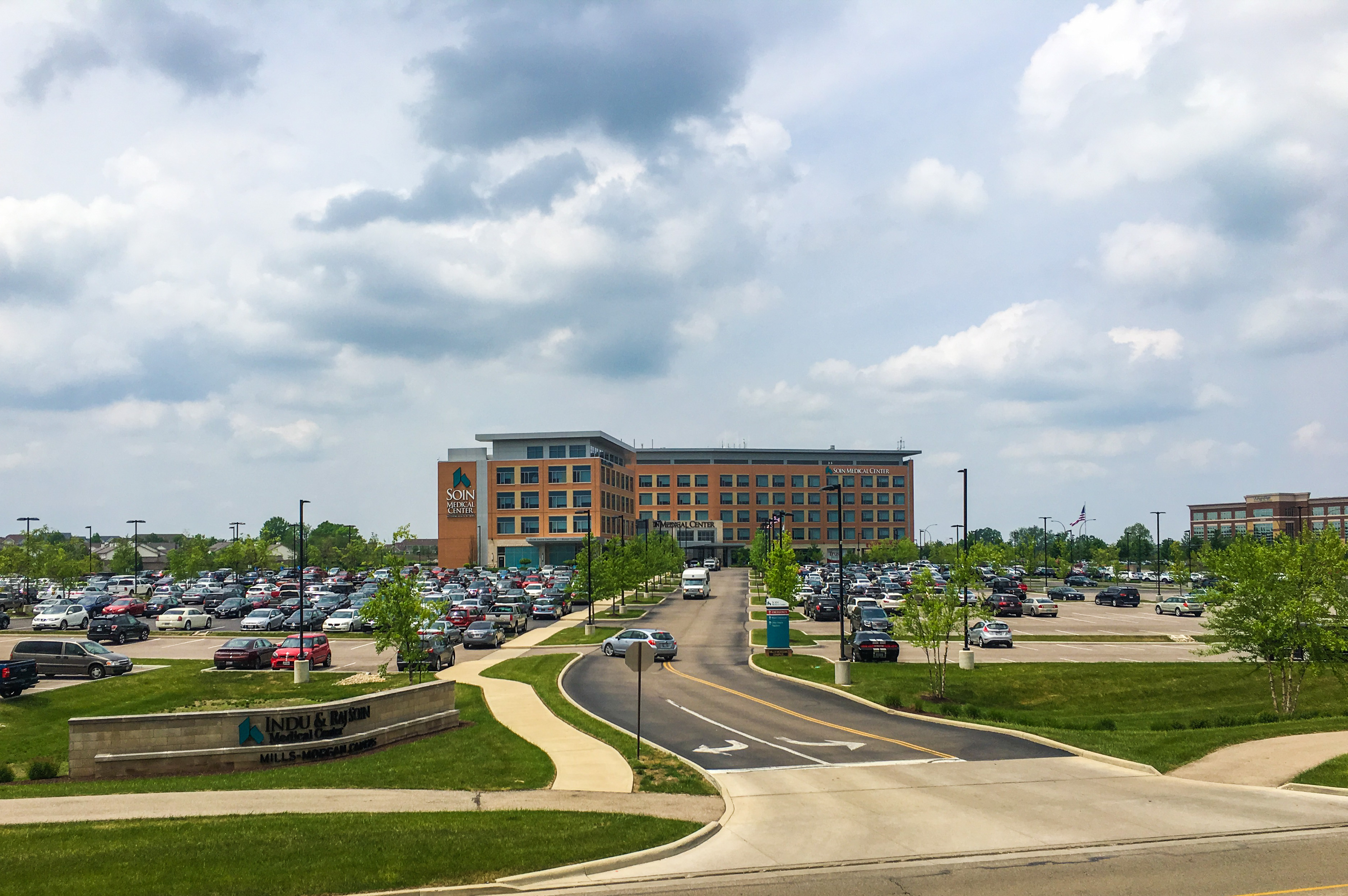
- Soin Medical Center, May 2018

Geography
- Location: 3535 Pentagon Blvd., Beavercreek, Ohio, United States
- Coordinates: 39°46′16″N 84°3′45″W

Organization
- Care system: Private hospital
- Funding: Non-profit hospital
- Type: General hospital
- Religious affiliation: Seventh-day Adventist Church

Services
- Emergency department: Yes
- Beds: 206

Helipads
- Helipad: Aeronautical chart and airport information for OA35 at SkyVector

History
- Construction started: August 2009
- Opened: February 22, 2012

Links
- Website: www.ketteringhealth.org/locations/soin-medical-center-kettering-health-mc005/
- Lists: Hospitals in Ohio

Soin Medical Center is a non-profit hospital in Beavercreek, Ohio, United States, next to the Mall at Fairfield Commons. It is part of the Kettering Health. The medical center is accredited by the Accreditation Commission for Health Care.

== History ==
In early August 2009, construction workers broke ground on the hospital, at a cost of $135 million. Soin Medical Center was built in response to Dayton, Ohio's rapidly growing suburbs and to serve some of its more profitable customers. It is the only hospital in a 10-mile radius which is home to more than 131,000 residents. On May 4, 2010, the hospital was named after Indu and Raj Soin, philanthropists who have donated a large, undisclosed sum of money towards the project.

On February 22, 2012, Soin Medical Center opened to patients. It features 206 beds and was designed for expansion up to 300. Current hospital services include emergency care, general surgery, orthopedic care, cardiac care, a birthing center, critical care, medical imaging and diagnostic services. The hospital is intended to serve the healthcare needs of nearby Wright Patterson Air Force Base and Wright State University, and to satisfy their anticipated population and development growth.

In July 2013, Soin Medical Center completed the addition of 31 beds to the hospital's fourth floor to meet the demand for surgical services.

In early February 2014, the hospital was designated a Level III trauma center by the American College of Surgeons.

On April 13, 2024, Soin Medical Center officially stopped being a trauma center.

== See also ==
- List of Seventh-day Adventist hospitals
