= Dayton Mall =

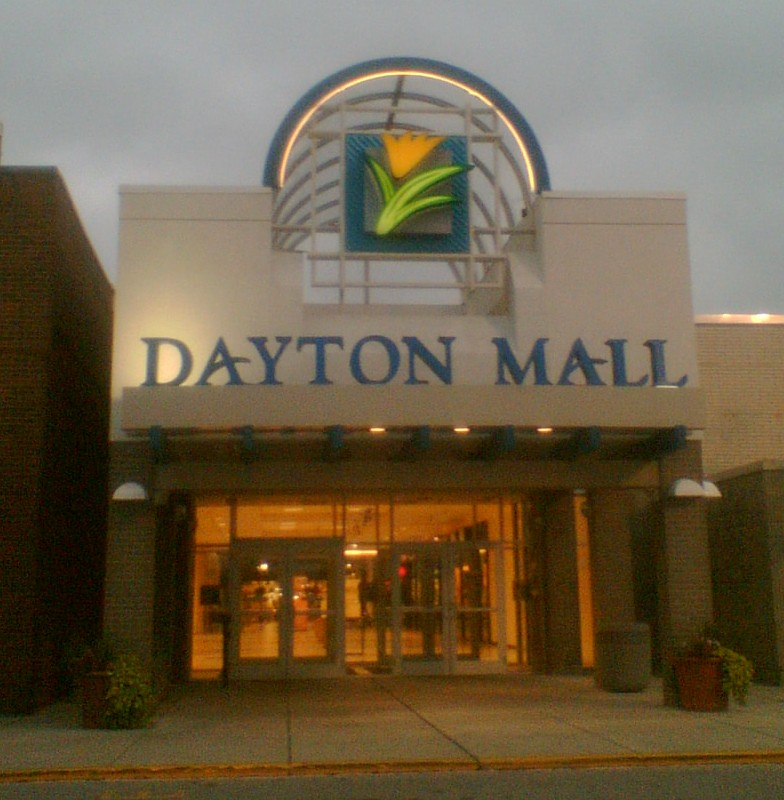
- Location: Miami Township, Montgomery County, Ohio, United States
- Coordinates: 39.63395°N 84.22060°W
- Opened: February 12, 1970; 56 years ago
- Developer: Edward J. DeBartolo Corporation
- Manager: Hull Property Group
- Owner: Hull Property Group
- Num. of stores: 158
- Num. of anchor tenants: 4 (3 open, 1 vacant)
- Floor area: 1,416,846 square feet (131,629 m^{2})
- Floors: 2 (3 in Macy’s)
- Public transit: RTA
- Website: daytonmall.com

Dayton Mall is a shopping mall in Miami Township, Montgomery County, Ohio, United States, a suburb of Dayton. The mall's anchor stores are Macy's and JCPenney; Crossroads Dayton, the local location of a Cincinnati-based megachurch, also serves as a major anchor. Junior anchors are Dick's Sporting Goods, DSW, Guitar Center, H&M, Kirkland's, LensCrafters, Morris Home Furniture, Ross Dress for Less, and Ulta Beauty. There is a vacant anchor store that was once Elder-Beerman. Located ten miles (16 km) south of downtown Dayton, just north of the junction of Interstate 75 and Interstate 675 between the suburbs of Centerville and Miamisburg, the mall has attracted millions of visitors since its grand opening in 1970. The mall is owned, managed, and leased by Hull Property Group.

== History ==
The Edward J. DeBartolo Corporation announced the construction of the Dayton Mall in 1969. According to developers, it was the largest mall constructed between New York City and Chicago at the time. Over 100 stores were announced, including three anchor stores: J. C. Penney, Sears, and Rike's. Other major tenants included four smaller department stores: Metropolitan, Donenfeld's, Dunhill's, and Thal's. There were also three outparcel tire and auto service centers. The Dayton Mall's official grand opening was held in 1970, although some stores were already in operation at the time, such as Rike's, Hickory Farms and the single-screen Dayton Mall Cinema.

Rike's, owned by Federated Department Stores, was merged with Federated's Shillito's in 1982 as Shillito–Rike's. The store changed names again in 1986 to Lazarus. After adopting the Lazarus-Macy's brand in 2003, the store fully adopted the Macy's name in 2005; it contains 263,566 sq ft (24,486 m^{2}).

The over one-million-square-foot (92,903 m^{2}), bi-level shopping center was the largest in southwestern Ohio for many years. Several more stores were added when the Dayton Mall underwent two major renovations of its existing structure in 1984 and 1995-1996. In the first renovation, the interior of the east and west concourses was remodeled, as was the two-level main entrance. The central atrium area was also improved with a food court installed on its mezzanine.

On August 4, 1972, Cinema 2 opened on the mezzanine level; in October 1976, Cinemas 3 and 4 opened, also on the mezzanine, across from Cinema 2; Cinemas 5–8 opened in 1982, attached to the mall but with only exterior public entrances. Cinemas 2, 3 and 4 closed in 1993, 5–8 closed in 2000, and the original cinema closed in January 2001. Most of the cinema space was reutilized, but as of 2012, the space formerly housing Cinemas 3 and 4 remains unused behind a wall.

After the supermarket closed, its space was allocated to a Morrison's Cafeteria and a few other retailers in late 1980. In 1988, the restaurant was rebranded as Morrison's corporate sibling Sadie's Buffet & Grill. In April 1993, the restaurant was replaced by a Discovery Zone children's entertainment facility.

In the mid-1990s, a fourth anchor store was added in front of what had been the main entrance. It was occupied by J. C. Penney, which moved from its former location at the west end of the mall; its current location contains 179,000 sq ft (16,630 m^{2}). The original J. C. Penney location became a Cincinnati-based McAlpin's in 1996 and then a Dayton-based Elder-Beerman in 1998; the store contained 227,070 sq ft (21,095 m^{2}). After these renovations were completed, the Dayton Mall had nearly 150 retailers under one roof.

In 1997, the mall was acquired by Washington Prime Group, a Columbus-based firm.

A 20,000 sq ft (1,900 m^{2}) Designer Shoe Warehouse (DSW) store opened on July 9, 2000. Anticipated to open prior to the 2000 holiday shopping season, Discovery Zone was replaced by a 30,000 sq ft (2,800 m^{2}) Linens 'n Things in early 2001; Linens 'n Things was considered a junior anchor of the mall. In addition, a new exterior public entrance and new public restrooms were added to this area of the mall.

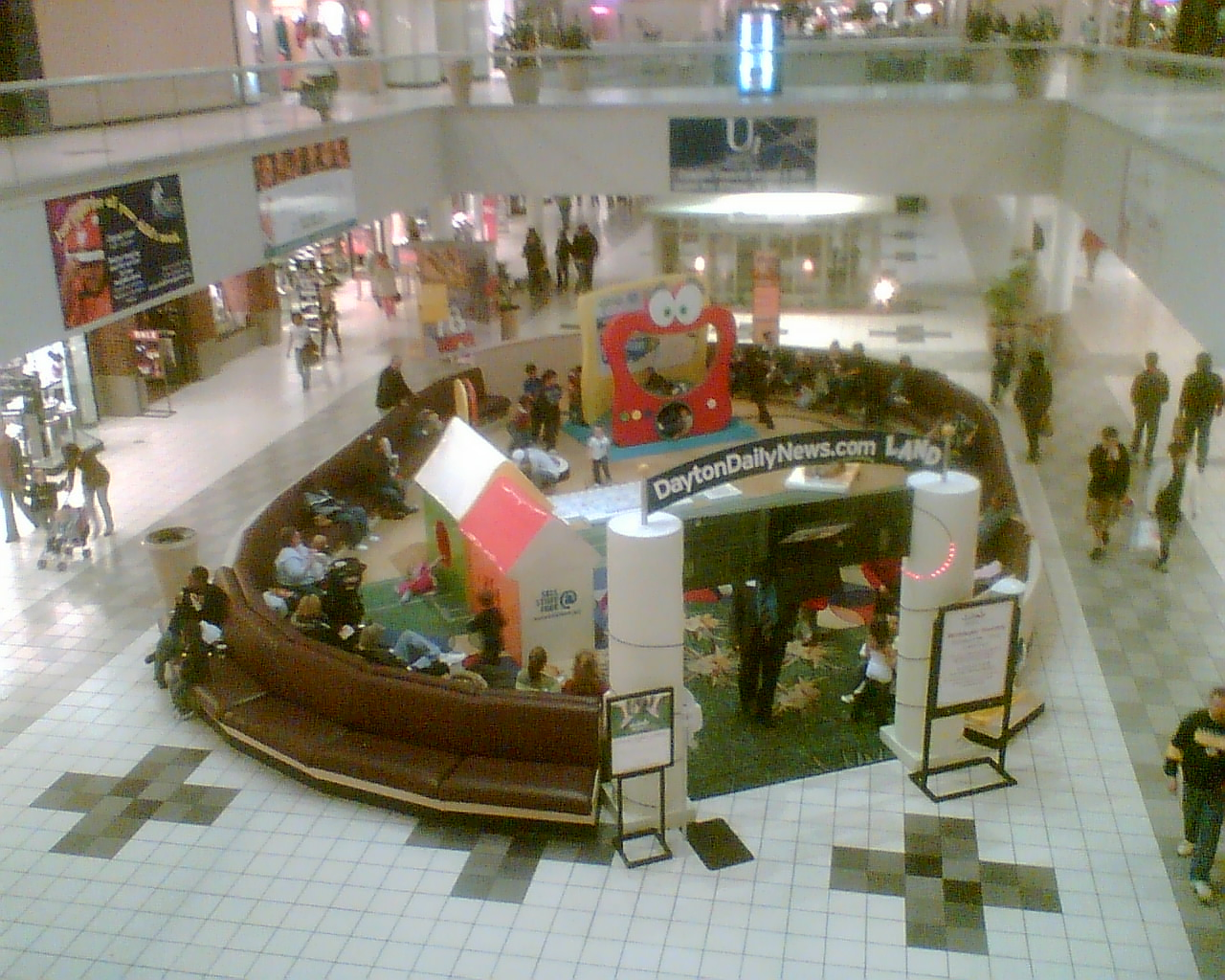
The Dayton Daily News sponsored Kiddie Land at the Dayton Mall in 2009.

The Greene Town Center, a retail and entertainment complex, opened in suburban Beavercreek in August 2006, prompting the Dayton Mall and The Mall at Fairfield Commons (both malls were owned at this time by Washington Prime Group) to extend their properties to attract more visitors. A 97,000-square-foot (9,000 m^{2}), open-air, "lifestyle component" was added in the Dayton Mall's north parking lot, along Ohio State Route 725. Known as "The Village At Dayton Mall", it added twenty-five tenants and was dedicated in early 2007. With the completion of this addition, the Dayton Mall encompassed 1,300,306 leaseable square feet (120,802 m^{2}).

In 2012, the DSW store moved to a space in the "lifestyle" area of the mall formerly held by Borders. In April 2012, Dick's Sporting Goods announced that it would relocate from a nearby location in Miamisburg and occupy the space held formerly by DSW and f.y.e. in the mall, adding another anchor tenant and boosting the mall's occupancy rate above 95 percent.

In November 2014, Doppelganger Laboratories opened a store in the Dayton Mall employing a Shapify Booth, manufactured by Luxembourg's Artec Group. The booth takes a 3D scan of a person, then 3D prints a lifelike, full-color miniature figurine of the person. This was the first retail use of the booth in the United States.

Linens & More for Less opened at the mall in 2010, taking space formerly occupied by Linens 'n Things. Linens & More for Less closed in November 2012; its space was taken over in May 2013 by H. H. Gregg, which relocated from Miamisburg. On April 7, 2017, H. H. Gregg announced that the entire chain was going out of business, and the store closed that May.

In 2015, Sears Holdings spun off 235 of its properties, including the Sears at Dayton Mall, into Seritage Growth Properties.

On October 25, 2017, it was announced that the freestanding Sears Auto Center would be converted to an Outback Steakhouse and another unnamed tenant.

On June 2, 2018, Macy's opened its off-price store concept, a 12,900-square-foot (1,200 m^{2}) Macy's Backstage outlet, within its mall location.

On June 20, 2018, it was announced that a Ross Dress for Less would open in the former H. H. Gregg location; it opened on October 12, 2019.

On July 26, 2018, it was announced that The RoomPlace would open a home furniture store in the mall. Sources initially disagreed as to the details. Trade magazine Furniture Today claimed that a 51,000-square-foot (4,700 m^{2}) store was scheduled to open around late summer 2019. Trade magazine Shopping Centers Today claimed that the RoomPlace would move into an empty anchor store, however, a press release from Columbus-based mall owner Washington Prime Group stated that the store would be in newly created inline space. In late November 2018, it was reported that Old Navy, with a Dayton Mall location, would open a store in the Austin Landing development, also in Miami Township. On January 30, 2019, the mall's Old Navy location closed and it was reported soon after that the RoomPlace would open in the former Old Navy space later in the year. The RoomPlace was still slated to join the mall as late as February 13, 2020. On February 25, 2020, it was announced that locally-based regional chain Morris Home Furniture would be opening instead in the space planned for The RoomPlace, with The RoomPlace confirming two days later that it had shelved its plans to enter the Dayton market. The Morris showroom was tentatively scheduled to open in spring 2020.

Elder-Beerman closed on August 29, 2018, due to the bankruptcy of parent company The Bon-Ton.

After an August 22, 2018 announcement that Sears would be closing as part of a plan to close 46 locations nationwide, the 175,083 sq ft (16,266 m^{2}) store closed on November 25, 2018.

On November 27, 2019, it was announced that Washington Prime Group had purchased the former Elder-Beerman space from Elder Ohio, a Delaware-registered trust, for $3.6 million. The company had plans to redevelop the site, which contains 15 acres (6.1 ha) and was valued at over $6.4 million as of 2019 (in contrast, the space was valued at $11.7 million in 1996).

Around December 28, 2021, or sometime prior, on behalf of Washington Prime Group's lenders, leasing and management of the mall was transferred to Spinoso Real Estate Group, a Syracuse, New York-based company, that at the time managed 32 U.S. malls. It was unknown if the mall's ownership had changed.

On August 22, 2022, it was reported that Cincinnati-based multisite interdenominational megachurch Crossroads had purchased the former Sears site, intending to relocate Dayton-area services from Bellbrook Middle School and other rented facilities to the mall location. Contrary to other statements about the size of the former store, the reported size of the project is 166,760 sq ft (15,493 m^{2}). Cost estimates were undetermined as of the date of the report. Construction on the project began in February 2024, with completion estimated to be the end of 2024 or early 2025. The church, which includes a 1,589-seat auditorium, held its grand opening on Easter Sunday, April 20, 2025.

On April 15, 2025, it was reported that Washington Prime Group had sold the former Elder-Beerman space for $2.5 million to Miamisburg Springboro Mall Anchor LLC, a recently formed limited liability company associated with Mayfield Heights, Ohio-based developer Industrial Commercial Properties LLC, which has purchased commercial properties near the Dayton Mall as well as done other Ohio mall redevelopments.

In early May 2025, it was reported that Macy's would be closing by the end of the year and that the property was listed for sale at slightly over $1.4 million on LoopNet. In December 2025, Macy's denied that the store would be closing, with the earlier, unofficial comments ascribed to a store manager. The location is no longer listed on LoopNet. Also in December, Macy’s as a whole reported a surprise third‑quarter profit and its strongest sales in more than three years.

On October 27, 2025, Augusta, Georgia-based Hull Property Group announced that it had acquired the mall out of Washington Prime Group's Chapter 11 bankruptcy receivership. As of November 2025, other malls that Hull Property Group owns in the region are suburban Cincinnati's Eastgate Mall in Glen Este, Union Township, Clermont County; as well as Richmond Mall in Richmond, Indiana. On October 29, The Mall at Fairfield Commons was sold to the Dayton Mall's former management company, Spinoso Real Estate Group, and its joint venture partner Kize Capital.

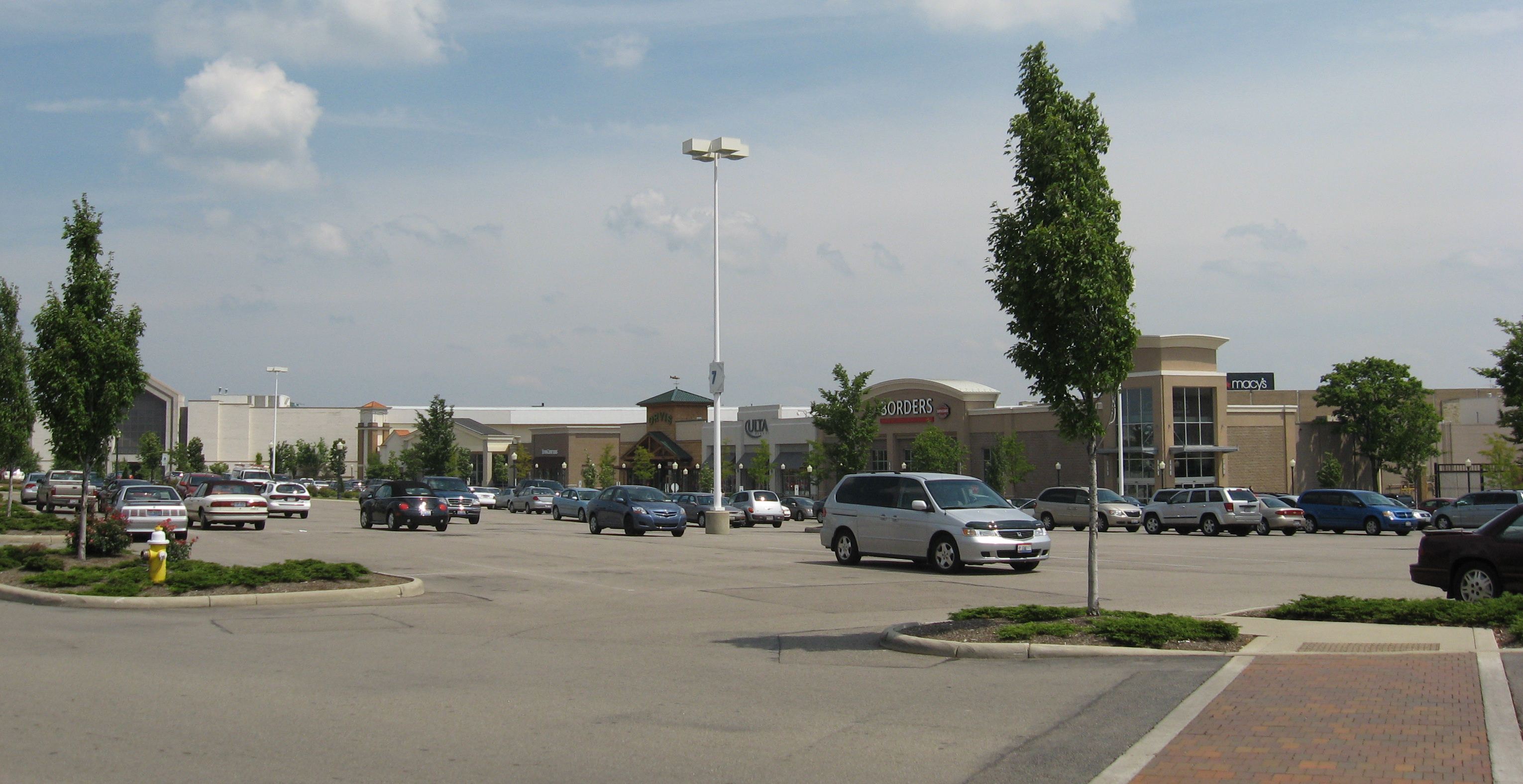
North side of the Dayton Mall
