= Zona Rosa (Kansas City, Missouri) =

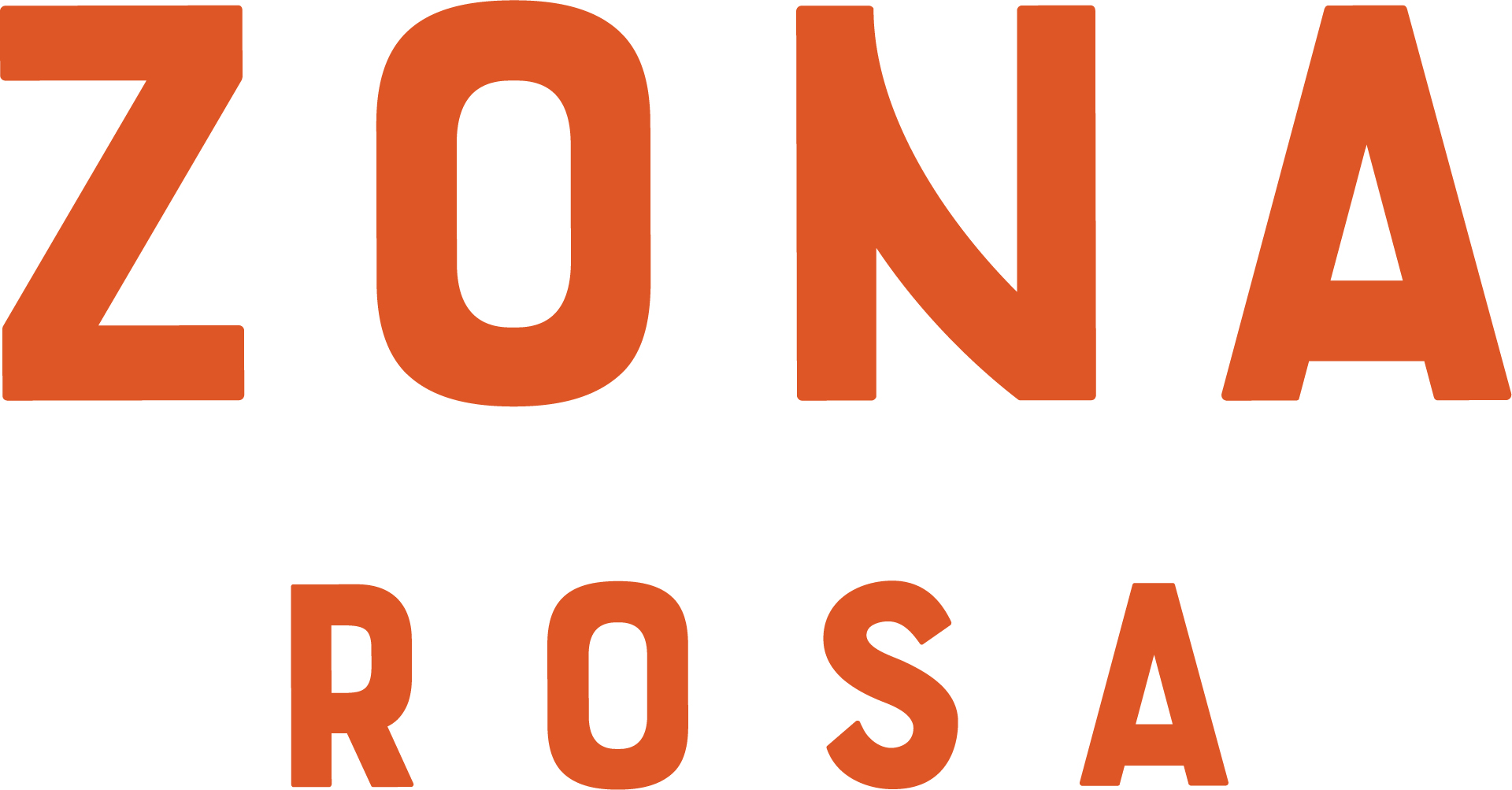
- Location: 8640 N. Dixson Avenue; Kansas City, Missouri
- Coordinates: 39.251°N 94.6653°W
- Opened: 2004
- Developer: Steiner & Associates
- Num. of anchor tenants: 2
- Floor area: 1,000,000 square feet (93,000 m^{2})
- Public transit: RideKC
- Website: zonarosa.com

Zona Rosa is an approximately 1,000,000 square feet (93,000 m^{2}), mixed-use lifestyle center located in Kansas City, Platte County, Missouri. The project opened in 2004 and was expanded by an additional 500,000 square feet (46,000 m^{2}) starting in 2008, including the addition of Dillard's, which moved from Metro North Mall. Zona Rosa was developed by Steiner+Associates, known for the Easton Town Center development in Columbus, Ohio. It is currently anchored by Old Navy, Barnes & Noble and Dillard's.

Zona Rosa is currently managed by Trademark Property based in Fort Worth, TX.

== History ==
Zona Rosa was conceptualized as Kansas City's inaugural urban town center, designed to create a pedestrian-friendly environment, at its inception, the development boasted 30 stores and restaurants, a number that has since burgeoned to 140 retail spaces.

Named after an urban shopping district of the same name in Mexico City, Zona Rosa was spearheaded by Steiner + Associates Inc. and Mall Properties Inc. (now known as Olshan Properties).

== Features ==
Zona Rosa, situated on 93 acres near Interstate 29 and Barry Road, serves as Kansas City's inaugural urban town center. Designed to evoke the ambiance of a traditional town square, it integrates mixed-use spaces with outdoor public areas. The development has revived Kansas City's holiday traditions, featuring annual displays of illuminated crowns reminiscent of those from the 1950s.

With an initial launch comprising 30 stores and restaurants, the $200 million project has expanded to encompass 140 retail spaces across 1 million square feet. The site mixed retail, office, and residential facilities, drawing in 10 million visitors annually and generating substantial sales revenue.

== Brands ==
Zona Rosa have brands as Dillard's, Dicks Sporting Goods, Barnes & Noble, Sephora and Old Navy.

== See also ==
- Bayshore
- The Greene Town Center
- Liberty Center
- Easton Town Center
- La Palmera
