= Miami Township, Montgomery County, Ohio =

Township in Ohio, US

Miami Township
- Civil township
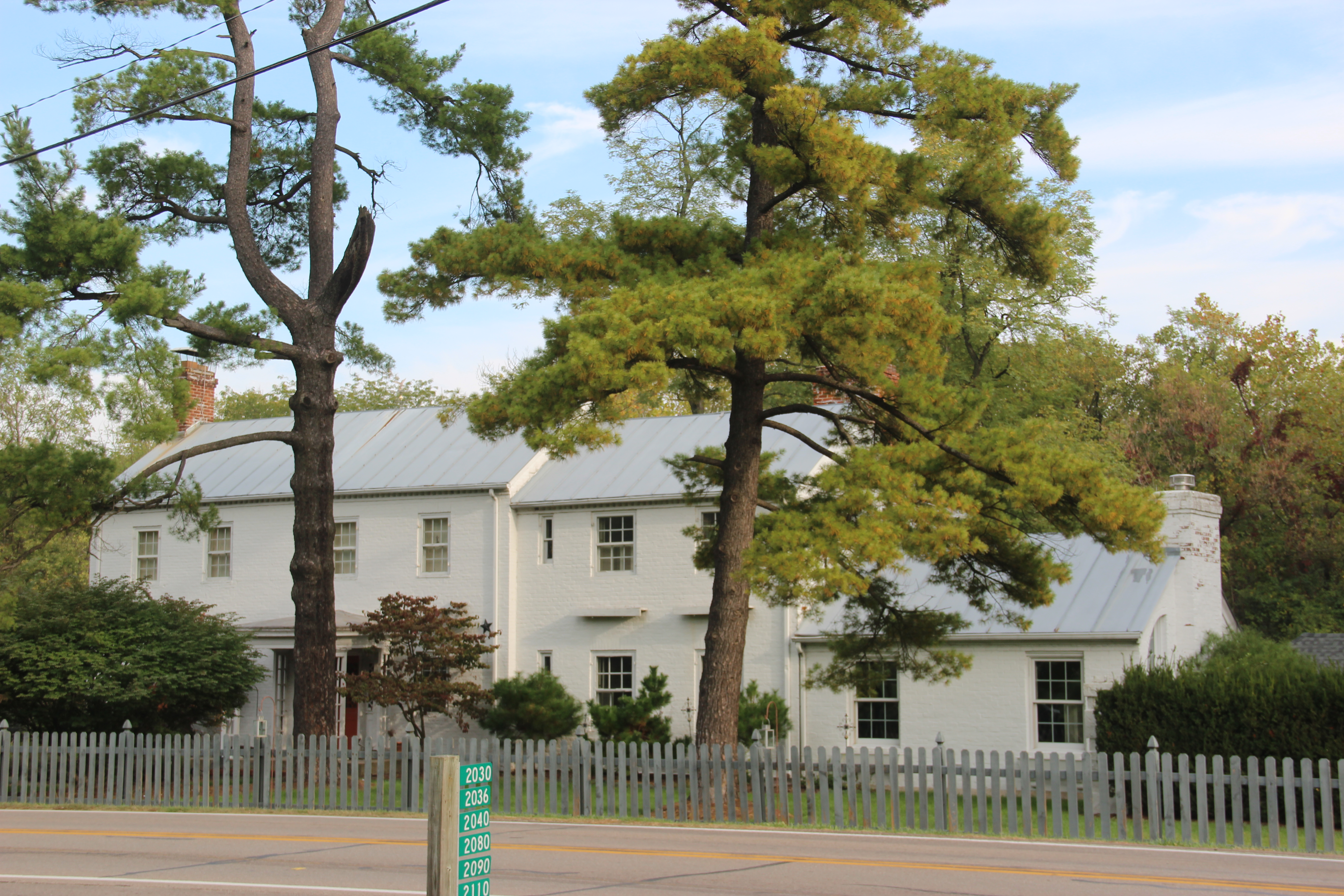
- Pease Homestead

- Flag Seal Logo

- Location in Montgomery County and the state of Ohio.
- Coordinates: 39°38′4″N 84°15′21″W
- Country: United States
- State: Ohio
- County: Montgomery

Area
  - Total: 34.4 sq mi (89.1 km^{2})
  - Land: 34.1 sq mi (88.2 km^{2})
  - Water: 0.39 sq mi (1.0 km^{2})
- Elevation: 920 ft (280 m)

Population (2020)
  - Total: 52,156
  - Density: 1,530/sq mi (591/km^{2})
- Time zone: UTC-5 (Eastern (EST))
  - Summer (DST): UTC-4 (EDT)
- FIPS code: 39-49392
- GNIS feature ID: 1086675

Miami Township is one of the nine townships of Montgomery County, Ohio, United States. The population was 52,156 at the 2020 census.

== Geography ==
Located in the southern part of the county, it borders the following townships and cities:

- Moraine - north
- Kettering - northeast
- Washington Township - east
- Clearcreek Township, Warren County - southeast
- Franklin Township, Warren County - south
- German Township - west
- Jefferson Township - northwest

Several cities are located in Miami Township:

- Part of Carlisle, in the southwest
- Miamisburg, in the center
- Part of Springboro, in the southeast
- Part of West Carrollton, in the north

The township is highly urbanized in its eastern half, nearest to Miamisburg and Kettering. Ohio law prohibits townships from collecting income taxes from residents; thus, the township has seen higher growth than incorporated towns nearby.

== Name and history ==
Statewide, other Miami Townships are located in Clermont, Greene, Hamilton, and Logan Counties.

In 1833, Miami Township contained eight gristmills, six saw mills, six distilleries, and one cotton factory.

== Economy ==
Miami Township is home to the American offices of LexisNexis information systems and a regional office of MetLife insurance. It is also home to the area's oldest major shopping area, the Dayton Mall, and it has Southview Hospital, a member of the Kettering Medical Center Network, a Seventh-day Adventist facility.

== Government ==
The township is governed by a three-member board of trustees, who are elected in November of odd-numbered years to a four-year term beginning on the following January 1. Two are elected in the year after the presidential election and one is elected in the year before it. There is also an elected township fiscal officer, who serves a four-year term beginning on April 1 of the year after the election, which is held in November of the year before the presidential election. Vacancies in the fiscal officership or on the board of trustees are filled by the remaining trustees.

Property taxes are used to fund police and fire departments.

== Transportation ==
It lies at a major access point to both Interstate 75 and Interstate 675.

== Education ==
Children from Miami Township attend the schools of Carlisle, Kettering, Miamisburg, West Carrollton, or Springboro.
