= Liberty Center (mall) =

Coordinates: 39°22′17.73″N 84°22′23.21″W

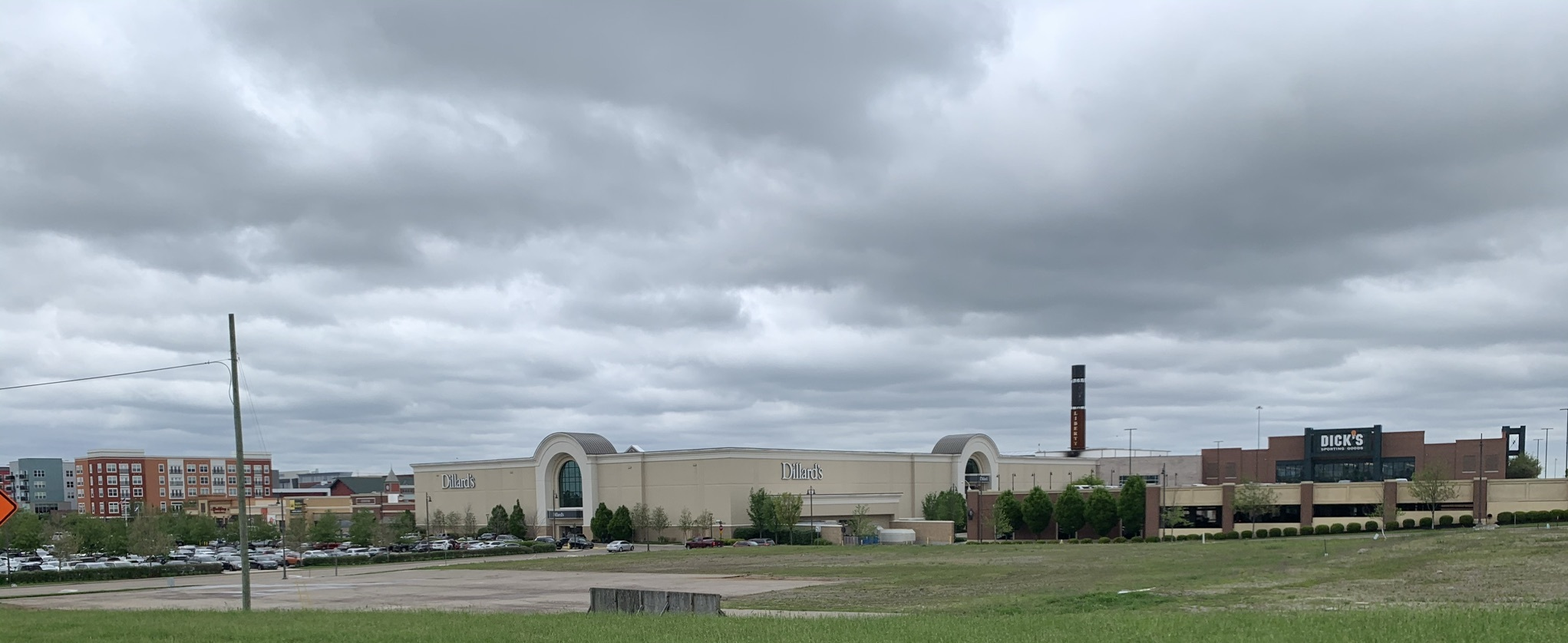
- The east end of Liberty Center in 2022.
- Location: Liberty Township, Butler County, Ohio, U.S.
- Address: 7100 Foundry Row
- Opened: October 2015
- Developer: Steiner & Associates
- Owner: JLL
- Num. of anchor tenants: 2
- Floor area: 1,200,000 square feet (110,000 m^{2})
- Floors: 2
- Website: https://www.liberty-center.com/

Liberty Center is a mixed-use retail shopping mall, residential, and office complex in Liberty Township, Butler County, Ohio, United States. Opened in 2015, it features over 1,200,000 square feet (110,000 m^{2}) of retail, entertainment, and offices. The center was built by Steiner Realty. Major tenants include Dillard's, Dick's Sporting Goods, Cobb Theatres, and AC Hotels.

== History ==
Upon opening in October 2015, Liberty Center had over 94 retailers and restaurants, including a Cobb Theatres CineBistro dine-in theater. The center was built on 65 acres (26 ha) of land, with over 1,200,000 square feet (110,000 m^{2}) of retail space. Also included in the original development were an AC Hotels and 249 apartments. Steiner & Associates chose the mall's site, on Liberty Way southwest of the junction of Interstate 75 and Ohio State Route 129, due to a lack of retail options between Cincinnati and Dayton. The retail portion of the complex consists of two portions: an outdoor lifestyle center with shops facing a street, and a two-story, enclosed mall known as the Foundry. The main anchor stores to The Foundry are Dick's Sporting Goods and Dillard's, the latter of which replaced a store at Tri-County Mall in Springdale.

In September 2018, developers Steiner + Associates transferred leasing and management duties of the mall to JLL. At the time of transfer, representatives noted that the mall had seen over 7 million visitors and a more than 10 percent increase in retail tenancy in the past year.

Gap Inc. closed its store at the mall in late 2018, while Claire's, a library, a local home decor store called Burlap & Birch, and an indoor skydiving center all opened.

== See also ==
- Bayshore
- The Greene Town Center
- Zona Rosa
- Easton Town Center
