= The Mall at Fairfield Commons =

Coordinates: 39.767084°N 84.055967°W

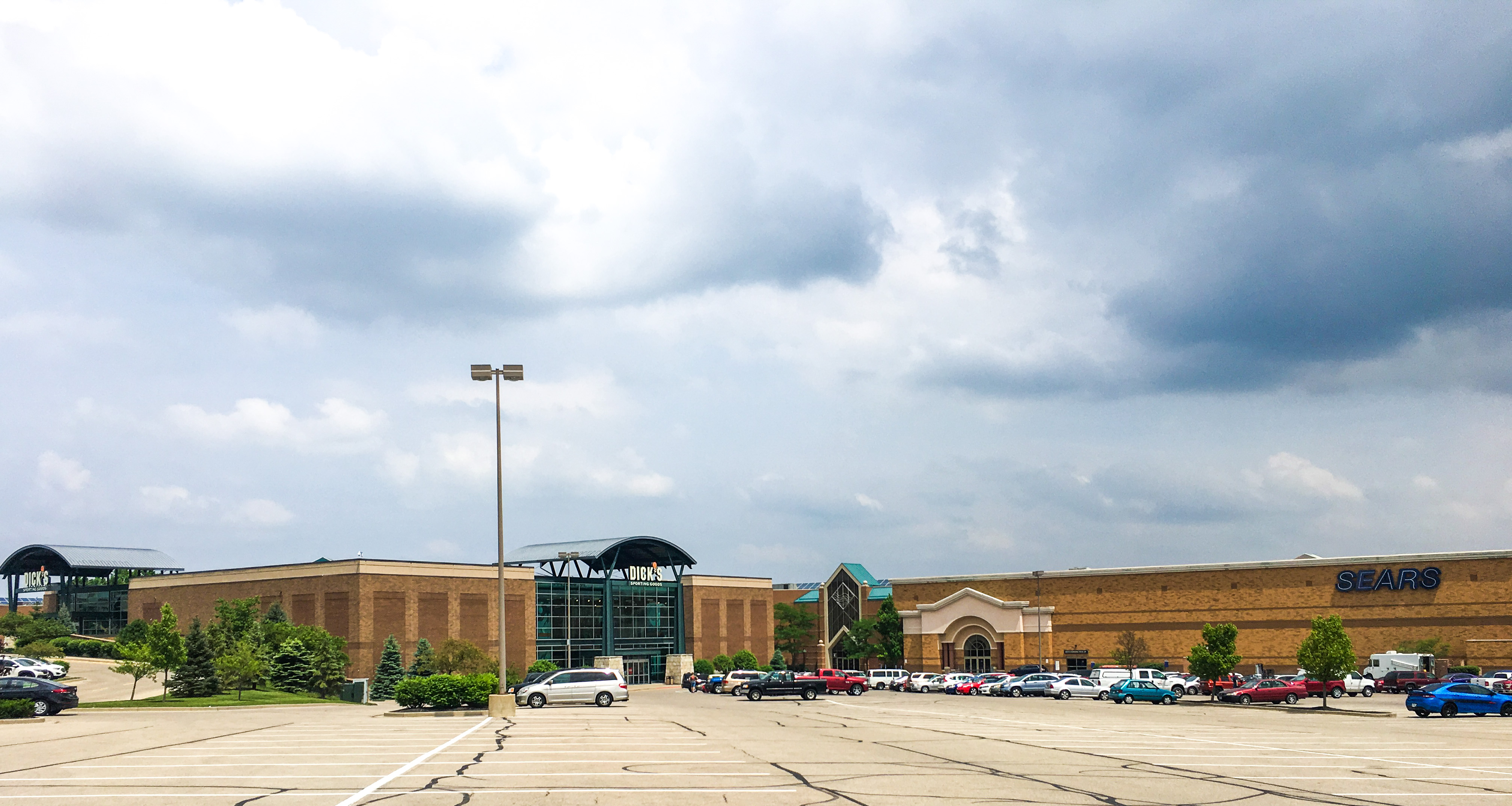
- Exterior view of The Mall at Fairfield Commons, May 2018
- Location: Beavercreek, Ohio
- Opened: October 27, 1993; 33 years ago
- Developer: Glimcher Realty Trust
- Owner: Spinoso Real Estate Group and Kize Capital
- Num. of stores: 142
- Num. of anchor tenants: 6 (5 open, 1 vacant)
- Floor area: 1,138,746 square feet (105,793 m^{2})
- Floors: 2
- Public transit: RTA

The Mall at Fairfield Commons, often referred to as the Fairfield Mall, is a shopping mall in Beavercreek, Ohio, United States, a suburb of Dayton. The mall was opened in 1993 and has two floors. The anchor stores are Dillard's, J. C. Penney, Dick's House of Sport (a subsidiary of Dick's Sporting Goods), Round 1 Entertainment, and Morris Home Furniture. There is one vacant anchor store, formerly occupied by Dick's Sporting Goods. Located adjacent to Interstate 675, the mall is near a golf course, Wright-Patterson Air Force Base, Wright State University and the Nutter Center entertainment complex. The mall is located just south of the interstate on North Fairfield Road (Veterans Memorial Highway), a main thoroughfare through Beavercreek. It offers over 140 different shops, department stores and restaurants, including a food court.

The Mall at Fairfield Commons is owned and operated by a joint venture between Spinoso Real Estate Group and Kize Capital.

== History ==
After a few days of soft openings with invited guests, the mall opened to the public on October 27, 1993 with a 150,800 sq ft (14,010 m^{2}) Elder-Beerman, a 130,000 sq ft (12,077 m^{2}) Parisian, a 127,922 sq ft (11,884 m^{2}) Sears and a 126,364 sq ft (11,740 m^{2}) J. C. Penney as anchors.

The J. C. Penney store in the mall replaced two other locations in the area: one in the Airway Shopping Center in then-Mad River Township (now Riverside) and a smaller store in Xenia. The mall's basic layout is a straight concourse connected to a diagonal concourse connected to another straight concourse; J. C. Penney's placement within the layout allows it to have two sets of interior public entrances on both floors: one set opens to the end of one of the straight concourses, while the other set opens to the middle of the other straight concourse. This configuration is unlike some malls that require customers to move through an anchor store to reach other parts of the mall; customers do not have to move through J. C. Penney to reach any other area of the mall.

A 151,552 sq ft (14,080 m^{2}) Lazarus (now Macy's) opened on September 23, 1994, with the official grand opening from September 30 to October 2; the store opened almost a year later than the other four anchors due to the 1992 emergence of Lazarus' parent company, Federated Department Stores, from bankruptcy reorganization, and also due to Lazarus' earlier commitment to a competing mall project.

An 85,498 sq ft (7,943 m^{2}) Dick's Sporting Goods store opened in 2004. Although two stories, the store's only interior public entrance was on the upper level, off the food court.

In fall 2007, The Bon-Ton Stores, owner of Elder-Beerman, converted the existing Parisian store to an additional Elder-Beerman location, housing women’s clothing, cosmetics, shoes and accessories. The existing Elder-Beerman store was reconfigured to house its men's, children's and home departments on the upper level, and a new furniture gallery on the lower level.

In April 2014, Elder-Beerman announced that it would consolidate its two mall locations back into its original location and eliminate the furniture gallery; the consolidation was complete on August 20, 2014. The vacated portion of the mall was demolished in early 2015; it was replaced between late 2015 and 2018 with six restaurants: two attached to the mall but with exterior-only public entrances, and four freestanding. An additional freestanding restaurant in the space opened in fall 2018.

Elder-Beerman closed on August 29, 2018, due to the bankruptcy of parent company The Bon-Ton.

After a September 18, 2018 announcement that Sears would be closing as part of a plan to close 12 locations nationwide, the store closed on December 9, 2018.

The lower level of the former Sears store opened as Round One Entertainment on November 23, 2019.

In spite of the fact that there had yet been no announcement that the Sears store would either be vacated or reduced in size, on July 26, 2018, it was announced that The RoomPlace would open a home furniture store in the mall. Trade magazine Furniture Today claimed that a 57,000-square-foot (5,300 m^{2}) store was then scheduled to open in fall 2019 in the upper level of the Sears space. The RoomPlace plans were confirmed on September 18, 2018, when the Sears closing was announced, and were reaffirmed as late as February 13, 2020. On February 25, 2020, it was announced that locally-based regional chain Morris Home Furniture would be opening instead in the upper level of the former Sears store, with The RoomPlace confirming two days later that it had shelved its plans to enter the Dayton market. The Morris showroom was tentatively scheduled to open in spring 2020; it opened on June 15.

From June 20 to August 2022, Morris offered a pop-up clearance and closeout location in the former Elder-Beerman space.

In February 2024, it was reported that Dick's Sporting Goods planned to open a Dick's House of Sport location in the former Elder-Beerman store. The facility was planned to allow patrons to practice and try out gear, and to provide space for patrons to hold events. It was also planned to include a climbing wall; golf simulators; multi-sport cages for baseball, softball, lacrosse and soccer; an outdoor track; and a 17,000-square-foot (1,600 m^{2}) outdoor turf field which could be used as a winter skating rink. The plans for the existing Dick's Sporting Goods store were not reported; signs on the existing store indicated that all operations would be moved into the House of Sport location. The store opened March 7, 2025.

On January 9, 2025, it was announced that Macy's would be closing as part of a plan to close 66 stores nationwide. The store closed on March 23, 2025.

On April 15, 2025, in the wake of corporate employee layoffs, the prior sale of assets in its portfolio, and its decision to sell the remainder of its portfolio, mall owner Washington Prime Group announced that it planned to sell the mall. No positions at the mall itself are expected to be eliminated. On October 29, 2025, the mall was sold to a joint venture (JV) between Syracuse, New York-based Spinoso Real Estate Group and New York City-based Kize Capital. As of November 2025, the JV also owned SouthPark Mall in Strongsville, Ohio, a Greater Cleveland suburb. Ironically, on October 27, Hull Property Group had announced that it had acquired the Dayton Mall, ending that mall's management by Spinoso Real Estate Group.

In October 2025, Beavercreek city planner Colin Caville announced that the city had issued a certificate on September 25 for Dillard's to open a store in the former Macy's location. In February 2026, Dillard's announced that they planned to open what was characterized as a 160,000 sq ft (14,864 m^{2}) location, as opposed to the 151,552 sq ft (14,080 m^{2}) listed in property records. As of early March 2026, the closest Dillard's locations to The Mall at Fairfield Commons are Cincinnati-area stores at Liberty Center in Liberty Twp., Butler County and the Kenwood Towne Centre in Kenwood, as well as at Richmond Mall in Richmond, Indiana. Dillard's held its grand opening as scheduled on March 19, 2026.

In early March 2026, Spinoso Real Estate Group owner Carmen Spinoso stated that he had been in the mall business since the 1980s, founding his company around 2009. Spinoso said that the mall's focus had shifted from traditional retail and restaurants to "experiential retail", placing more attention on events, activities and community gatherings.

=== Non-retail uses ===
In December 2020, it was reported that Mosaic Church, an almost three-year-old congregation which had been holding services in area movie theaters and parking lots, would move to one floor, approximately 75,000 sq ft (7,000 m^{2}), of the former Elder-Beerman space; the church opened on the upper level on January 10, 2021. As of December 2020, the mall's and University Baptist Church's websites suggested that the latter congregation would be opening a location in the lower level of the former Elder-Beerman space.

On June 4, 2021, Beavercreek-headquartered developer Synergy & Mills Development announced that in partnership with the mall's owner, Washington Prime Group, it would convert the entire former Elder-Beerman building into office, laboratory, and research and development space. The over $10 million project, which was to be called "The Meridian", would be built on spec starting in late 2021. The developers expected the complex to be popular with defense contractors due to nearby Wright-Patterson Air Force Base, but would also market the space to prospective tenants in other industries. As of June 2021, it was unknown when Mosaic and University Baptist churches would be expected to leave their spaces. In February 2024, it was reported that this plan had not proceeded.

From January 14 through February 27, 2022, "Michelangelo’s Sistine Chapel: The Exhibition", a traveling art exhibit reproducing the frescos on the Sistine Chapel ceiling, appeared at the mall in the upper level of the former Elder-Beerman store.
