= St. George's Catholic Church (Cincinnati, Ohio) =

- St. George Parish and Newman Center
- U.S. National Register of Historic Places
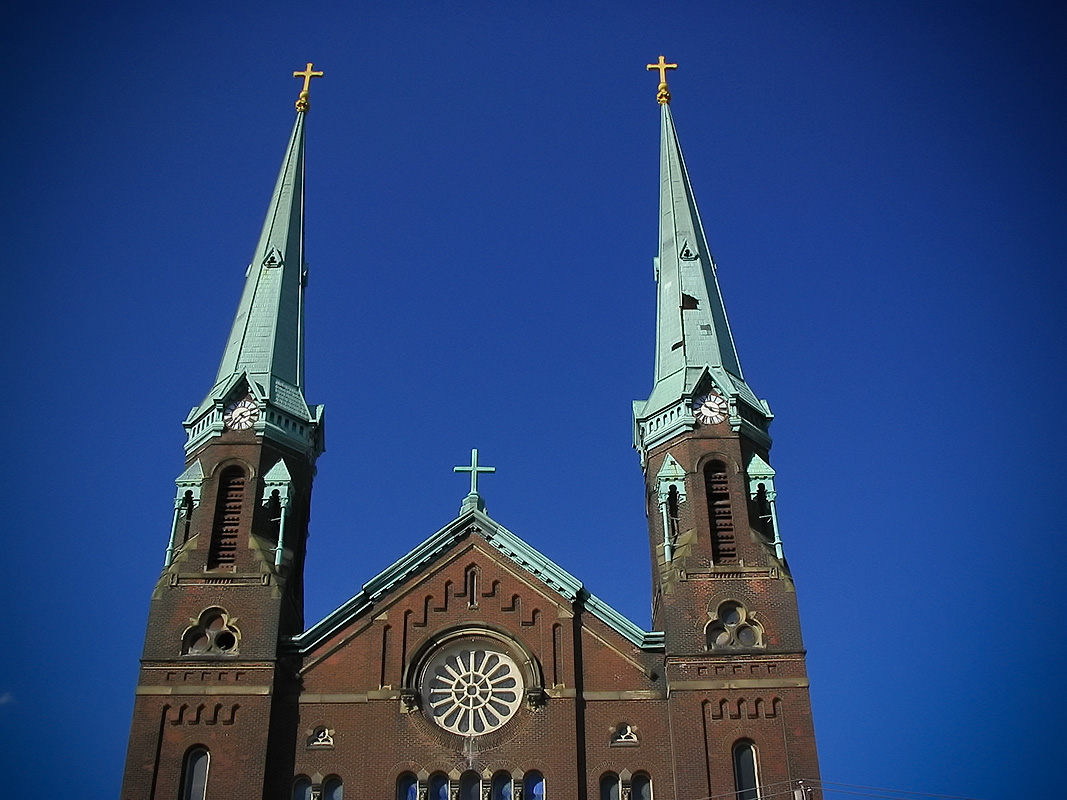
- Facade prior to the 2008 fire

- Location within Ohio Location within the United States
- Location: Cincinnati, Ohio
- Coordinates: 39°7′40.96″N 84°30′44.29″W
- Architect: Samuel Hannaford
- Architectural style: Romanesque
- MPS: Samuel Hannaford and Sons TR in Hamilton County
- NRHP reference No.: 80003088
- Added to NRHP: March 3, 1980

Old Saint George Church is a historic Catholic church in the Corryville neighborhood of Cincinnati, Ohio, near the University of Cincinnati. It was listed in the National Register of Historic Places on March 3, 1980, as St. George Parish and Newman Center.

The red brick church was designed by Samuel Hannaford in the Romanesque Revival style, and opened in 1873. Construction costs totaled $80,000.

Declining attendance brought about by shifts in neighborhood demographics and worship habits in the 1970s and 1980s led the Roman Catholic Archdiocese of Cincinnati to consolidate the parish with St. Monica's and close the church in 1993. The property was sold the following year to a group called the Christian Ministries Center, which operated a community and arts center out of it until 2004. St. George's two wooden spires were destroyed by fire on February 1, 2008.

In March 2015, Crossroads Church acquired the property from the Clifton Heights Community Urban Development Corporation and announced plans to renovate and occupy it as their fifth location in Ohio.

As part of the renovation, the destroyed wooden spires were replaced with steel-framed versions clad in perforated aluminum and designed to be illuminated from within. In August 2016, the church reopened as a satellite campus for Crossroads.

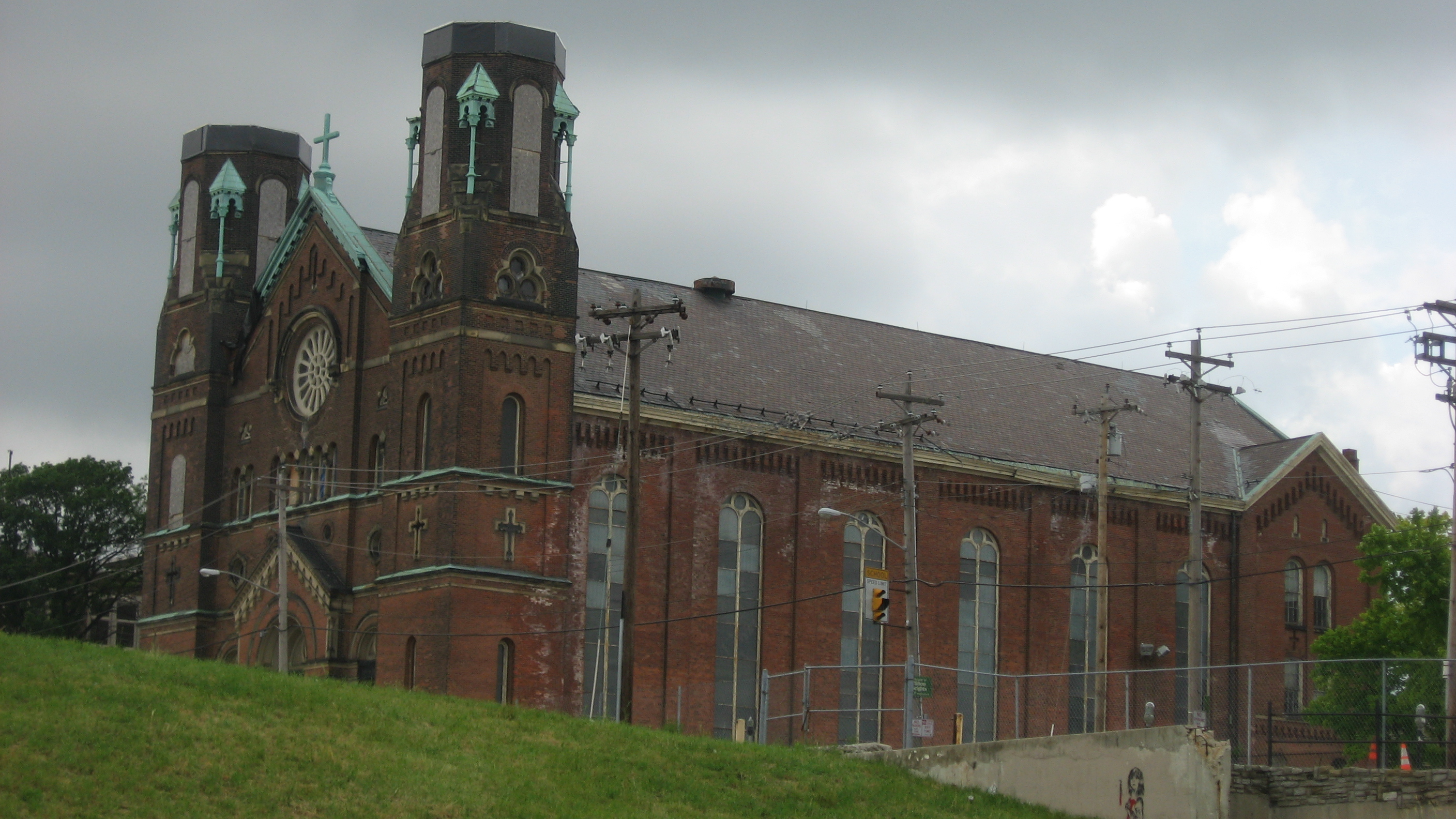
The church after the 2008 fire

Replacement twin spires in 2023
