= McAlpin's =

Department store

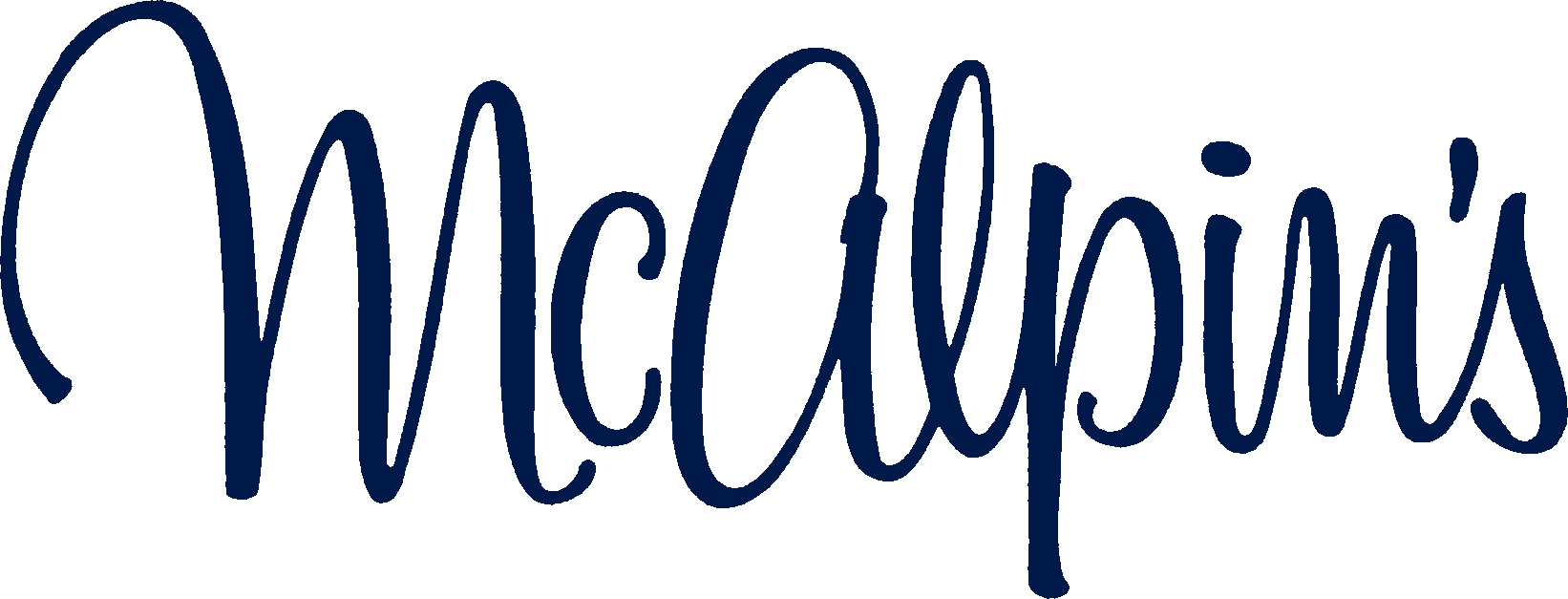
- McAlpin's logo

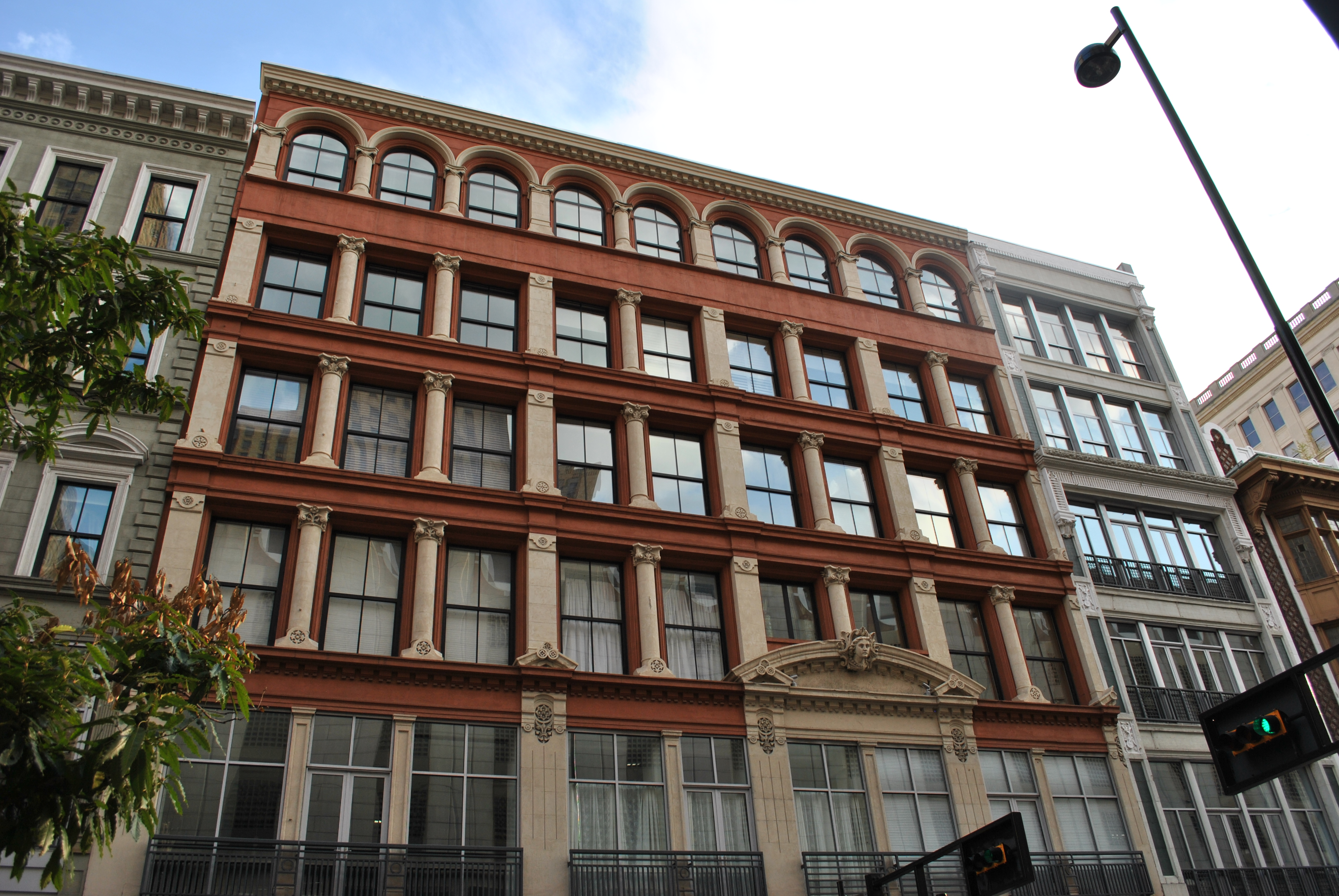
- The McAlpin building in 2014
- Company type: Subsidiary
- Industry: Retail
- Founded: 1852
- Defunct: 1998
- Fate: Converted to Dillard's
- Successor: Dillard's
- Headquarters: Cincinnati, Ohio, United States of America

McAlpin's was a Cincinnati-based department store founded in 1852 as Ellis, McAlpin & Co. McAlpin's opened their landmark downtown location on Fourth Street in 1880, taking over a building from their competitor Shillito's. In 1954, McAlpin's became the first Cincinnati department store to open a suburban site, in the Western Hills Shopping Center.

Two decades later, McAlpin's became a division of Mercantile Stores. In 1990, Mercantile moved their corporate headquarters to Fairfield, Ohio, a suburb of Cincinnati.

As retail companies consolidated, McAlpin's remained roughly the same. That ended in 1998 when McAlpin's parent company, Mercantile, was bought by Little Rock, Arkansas based Dillard's. All McAlpin's stores were subsequently converted to the Dillard's name that year except for the one in Dayton Mall, which was instead sold to Elder-Beerman.

The landmark Downtown Cincinnati store closed its doors in 1996. It was restored and reopened as The McAlpin, a 62-unit luxury condominium building.
