= Casual Living =

US magazine

Casual Living Magazine
- The Insider's Resource for Outdoor Style
- Type: Business-to-business lifestyle publication
- Format: Paper and online magazine
- Owner: BridgeTower Media
- Founded: 1958
- Language: English
- Headquarters: Greensboro, North Carolina
- Circulation: 19,000-plus
- ISSN: 0740-8285
- Website: www.casualliving.com

Casual Living (ISSN 0740-8285) is a trade publication and website owned by Progressive Business Media serving the information needs of retailers that sell outdoor furnishings and accessories as well as manufacturers and suppliers to the industry.

== History and profile ==
Casual Living was started in 1958. The magazine is published monthly with content including industry lifestyle features, business analysis and product trend information. Other articles in the magazine include reviews of furniture markets, profiles of successful retailers and manufacturers and guest columnists.

The editorial director is Vicky Jarrett and the editorial office is located in Greensboro, North Carolina.

As of October 2011, total circulation exceeds 19,000 subscribers.

Former owner Reed Business Information sold Casual Living to Sandow Media, the publisher of Worth magazine in 2010. Progressive Business Media purchased the magazine, along with its sister publications, in 2013. In 2018, BridgeTower Media acquired Progressive.
