= T. A. Chapman Co. =

Department store based in Milwaukee, Wisconsin

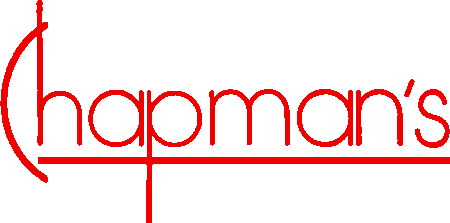
- Founded: 1857; 169 years ago
- Founder: Timothy Appleton Chapman
- Defunct: 1987
- Fate: Bankruptcy and liquidation
- Headquarters: Milwaukee, Wisconsin, United States

T. A. Chapman Co., commonly known as Chapman's, was a department store based in Milwaukee, Wisconsin. The chain was founded by Timothy Appleton Chapman in 1857. He opened the chain's flagship store on Wisconsin Avenue in downtown Milwaukee in 1872. The original Wisconsin Avenue location was destroyed by fire in 1884, and was rebuilt. In 1978, the company acquired Manchester's Department Stores in Madison, Wisconsin. The Chapman family retained ownership of the company until 1983, and eventually it had seven locations. The company filed for Chapter 11 bankruptcy in 1987. At that time, there were six locations: three in Milwaukee, two in Madison, and one in Appleton.
