= Kettering College =

Private Adventist college in Dayton, Ohio, US

Coordinates: 39.696076°N 84.191944°W

- Type: Private college
- Established: 1967
- Religious affiliation: Adventist
- President: Lamata Mitchell
- Administrative staff: 105
- Students: 832
- Location: Kettering, Ohio, United States
- Campus: Suburban
- Website: kc.edu

Kettering College (formerly Kettering College of Medical Arts) is a private Adventist college near Dayton, Ohio. The college is owned by the Kettering Medical Center and chartered by the Seventh-day Adventist Church. The college was built in 1967 next to the Charles F. Kettering Memorial Hospital. It is a member of the Strategic Ohio Council for Higher Education (SOCHE).

== Presidents ==
- William C. Sandborn, 1966–1969
- Winton H. Beaven, 1970–1983
- Robert A. Williams, 1983–1990
- Peter D. H. Bath, 1990–2000
- Charles Scriven, 2001–2013
- Alex Bryan, 2013–2014
- Nate Brandstater, 2014–2025
- Lamata Mitchell, 2025–present

== Academics ==
Kettering College offers a doctorate in occupational therapy, Master's degrees in physician assistant studies and nursing, and many Bachelor of Science and Associate of Science programs in health fields.

In 2024, Kettering College was ranked No. 535 in nursing by U.S. News & World Report.

== See also ==
- List of Seventh-day Adventist colleges and universities
- Seventh-day Adventist education
