= Kettering Health Washington Township =

- Kettering Health

Geography
- Location: 1997 Miamisburg Centerville Rd., Washington Township, Montgomery County, Ohio, United States
- Coordinates: 39.644098°N 84.20188°W

Services
- Beds: 129

History
- Founded: 1978

Links
- Website: ketteringhealth.org/locations/kettering-health-washington-twp-mc006/
- Lists: Hospitals in Ohio

Kettering Health Washington Township, formerly known as Southview Medical Center, is an acute care hospital in Washington Township, Montgomery County, Ohio, United States, at the junction of State Route 725 and Interstate 675. It is part of the Kettering Health network.

It features a maternity center, intensive care unit, catheter laboratory, endoscopy/colonoscopy center and the Hand Center of Southwest Ohio, a specialized center for the treatment of hand injuries. The only facility of its kind in Southwest Ohio, the Hand Center has five Board certified hand surgeons and a full therapy staff and physical therapy area. Southview has a medical imaging department and surgical and emergency services.

The hospital was originally opened in 1978 as an ambulatory care center for Grandview Medical Center in Dayton. Southview Medical Center is accredited by the American Osteopathic Association's Healthcare Facilities Accreditation Program.

Dayton Sports Medicine is based at Southview and offers a Tactical Training Course to improve the conditioning and general health of safety officers.

== See also ==
- List of Seventh-day Adventist hospitals
