= Kettering Health Main Campus =

Coordinates: 39.697107°N 84.192405°W

- Kettering Health

Geography
- Location: 3535 Southern Blvd., Kettering, Ohio, United States

Organization
- Care system: Private
- Type: Teaching
- Affiliated university: Wright State University; Boonshoft School of Medicine; Kettering College of Medical Arts

Services
- Standards: HFAP accreditation, HFAP Comprehensive Stroke Center
- Emergency department: Level II Trauma Center
- Speciality: Multispecialty

History
- Former names: Charles F. Kettering Memorial Hospital; Kettering Medical Center
- Opened: 1964

Links
- Website: ketteringhealth.org/locations/kettering-health-main-campus-mc004/
- Lists: Hospitals in Ohio
- Other links: List of hospitals in the United States

Kettering Health Main Campus, formerly known as Kettering Medical Center (KMC), non-profit hospital in Kettering, Ohio, United States. Founded in 1964, it is the flagship hospital of Kettering Health, and is directly affiliated with the Seventh-day Adventist Church. It is also affiliated with the Boonshoft School of Medicine.

== History ==
Virginia Kettering and her husband Eugene, son of famous inventor Charles F. Kettering, were native citizens of Dayton. They moved to Hinsdale, Illinois near Chicago in the 1940s. During the polio epidemic in the 1950s, they were inspired by the care given at Hinsdale Hospital, which would play a vital role in the foundation of Kettering Medical Center. Following the death of his father in 1958, the younger Ketterings moved from Illinois back to Dayton to help manage family affairs. Health care was a primary focus of Charles Kettering, so Eugene and Virginia led efforts to open a local area hospital in his honor. Ground was broken on July 7, 1961. In 1964, Charles F. Kettering Memorial Hospital opened under the leadership of the Seventh-day Adventist Church.

In 2016, Kettering Health opened the new pavilion that houses the Kettering Health Cancer Center, and Kettering Health Brain & Spine. The $60 million structure is connected to the main hospital via a skybridge over Southern Boulevard.

== Awards and recognitions ==
The hospital received a grade A from The Leapfrog Group from fall 2012 to spring 2015.

== See also ==
- List of Seventh-day Adventist hospitals
