= Easton Town Center =

Shopping mall in Columbus, Ohio

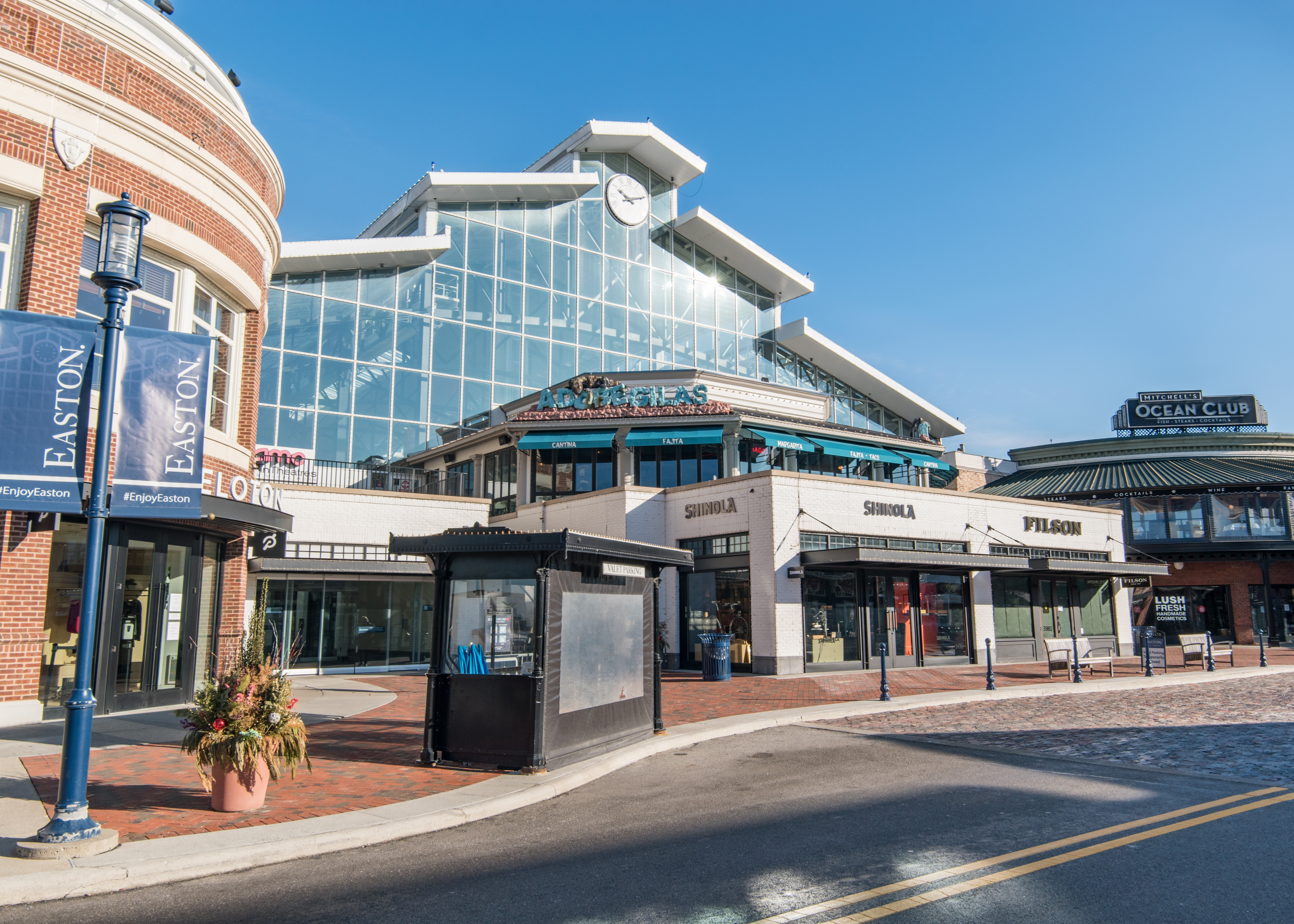
- The Station Building at Easton Town Center
- Boundaries of the central mall and Easton Gateway
- Location: Columbus, Ohio, U.S.
- Coordinates: 40°3′7″N 82°54′55″W
- Opened: 1999
- Developer: L Brands, Steiner and Associates, The Georgetown Company
- Manager: Steiner and Associates
- Num. of stores: ~300
- Floor area: 1,643,348 square feet (152,672.0 m^{2})
- Public transit: 7, 9, 23, 24, 25, 31, 32, 34, 35, 44, 45; CoGo
- Website: eastontowncenter.com

Easton Town Center is a shopping center in northeast Columbus, Ohio, United States. Opened in 1999, the core buildings and streets that comprise Easton are intended to look like a self-contained town, reminiscent of American towns and cities in the early-to-mid 20th century. Included in the design are fountains, streets laid out in a grid pattern surrounded by a continuous loop, and metered storefront parking.

A variety of stores, restaurants, and service-oriented businesses occupy structures of varying sizes, most of which are contiguous, having shared walls. Many of these structures have a similar external appearance. Also included are traditional shopping mall features like large, multi-floor department stores, small kiosks located in the indoor common areas, a cinema complex, ATMs, and both covered and open parking structures. Easton attracts more than 30 million visitors per year.

== Tenants and layout ==
Easton Town Center is anchored by Macy's (formerly Lazarus) and Nordstrom and includes about 300 other retail shops. Nordstrom is found at the northernmost point. Despite Easton being a developed town center, its grid system is not perfectly centered, with certain areas being designed for specific uses. For example, the South District hosts outdoor concerts, holiday events, and an interactive water fountain on its town square, and also has a large outdoor train set, the Easton Express. The only indoor area is the Station Building which houses shops, foodservice vendors, as well as a 30-screen AMC movie theater. Parking garages are scattered throughout. 2015 also saw additional retailers and restaurants moving into Easton Gateway, an expanded section of Easton.

The Easton area is a partnership between Limited Brands and the Georgetown Company. Easton Town Center is currently leased and managed by Steiner & Associates.

== History ==
The area that Easton Town Center now exists on was originally intended to be an expansion of Limited Brands. An outdoor lifestyle center was chosen in lieu of a traditional indoor mall in response to changing demographics by the late 1990s. It was co-developed by The Georgetown Company and Steiner + Associates and was one of the first lifestyle centers in the country. Among its then-unconventional features were indoor parking, town squares, various fountains, and varying types of tenants.

A real estate project of Les Wexner, the founder, chairman and CEO of nearby Limited Brands, Easton comprises 1.8 million square feet (170,000 m^{2}) of retail space built upon approximately 90 acres (360,000 m^{2}) within a larger 1,300-acre (5 km^{2}) development. The 1,300-acre (5,300,000 m^{2}) retail development was designed by M+A Architects. Actor and later politician Arnold Schwarzenegger was also an investor in the project.

Phase I (the South District) opened in the summer of 1999. It was the site of the first ever Hollister Co. store, which opened in 2000. Phase II (the "Fashion District") opened in the fall of 2001. The North District is also home to a large circular fountain.

Crate & Barrel constructed a location at Easton in 2004 and the South Garage was built to expand the number of parking spaces.

In late 2015, the newest expansion was completed: the Easton Gateway development. The district, with a focus on service tenants, expanded the mixed use area by 500,000 square feet (46,000 m^{2}). The first tenant to open was Costco which did so in October.

In early 2018, renovations on the center's Station Building had begun, including new floors walls, and updated services; the renovation ended in June. In late 2018, construction began on a $500 million expansion that would include a hotel, apartments, retail and offices. Included tenants announced were an Aloft Hotel, Pins Mechanical, and a Restoration Hardware flagship store named R.H. Gallery.

Developers for Easton Town Center are in the early stages of planning for another development, with buildings set for up to 40 stories. The project would involve thousands of residential units and hundreds of thousands of square feet of office space, leading to a dense urban center. The buildings would be the first skyscrapers in Columbus outside of its downtown.

In December 2023, it was announced that the American Girl doll store would be closing by February 19, 2024.

== Gallery ==
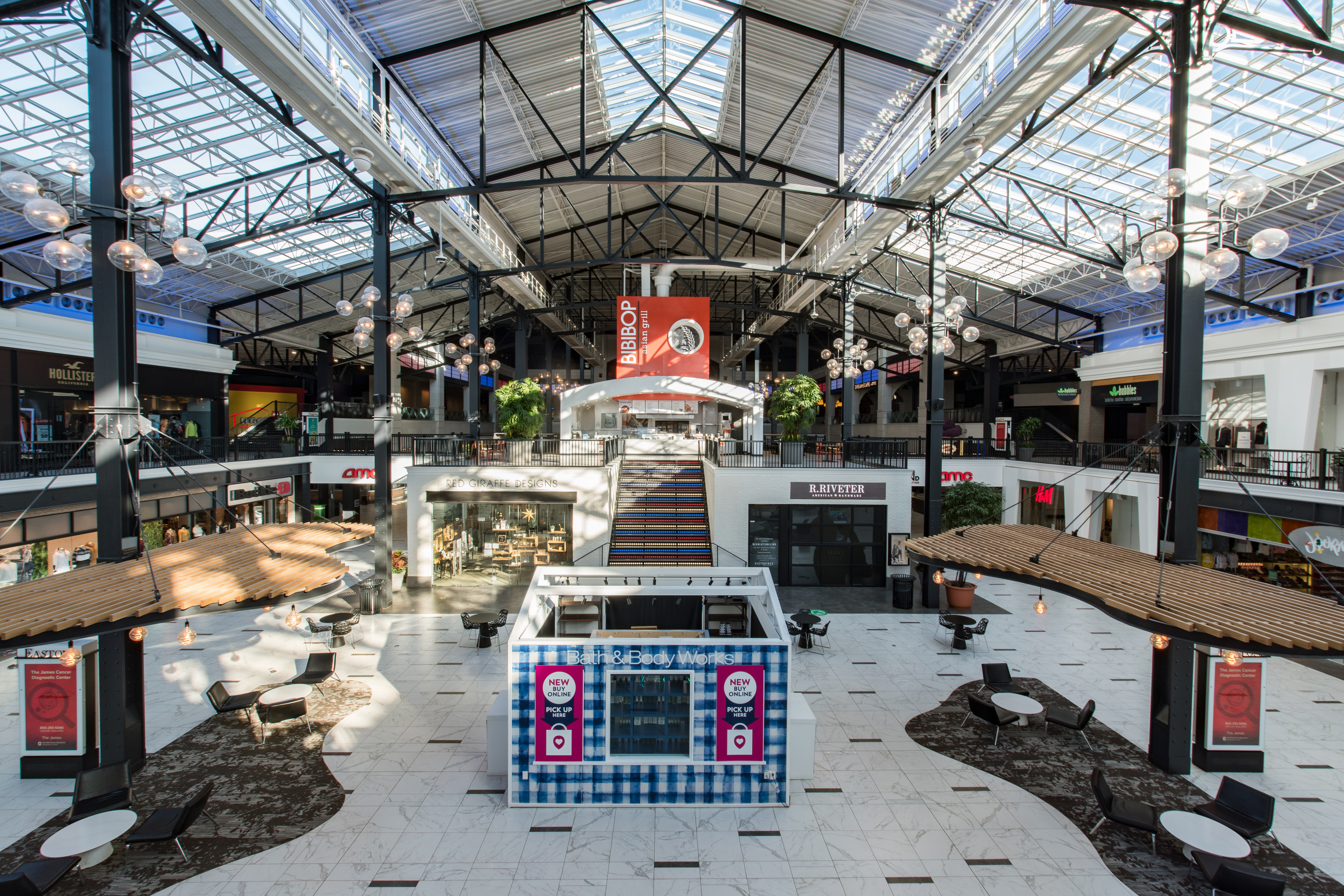
Mall interior

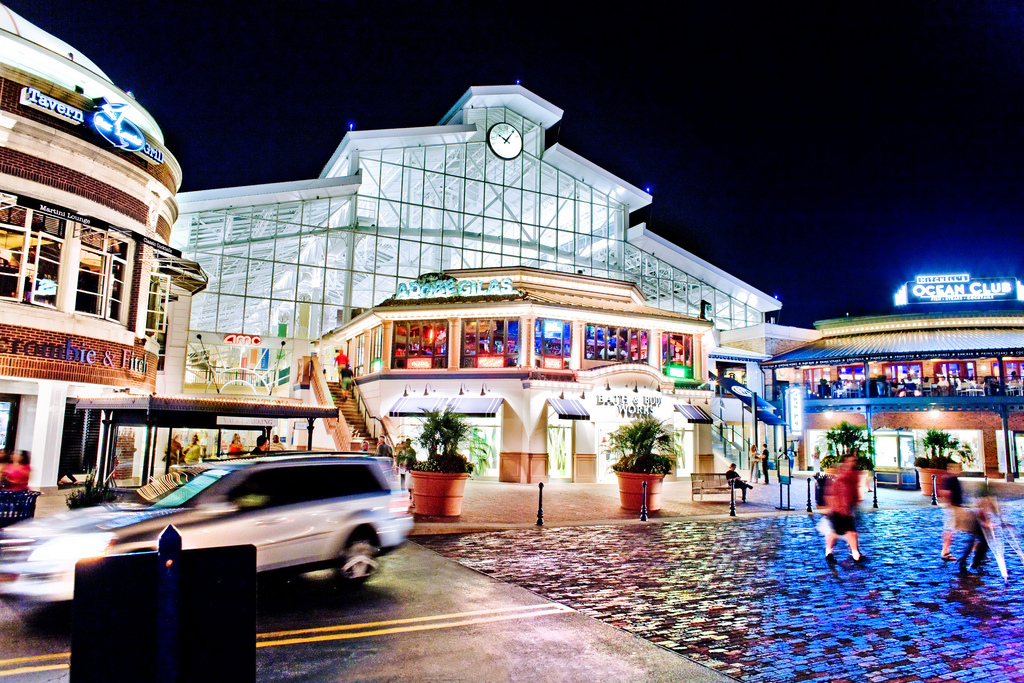
Mall building

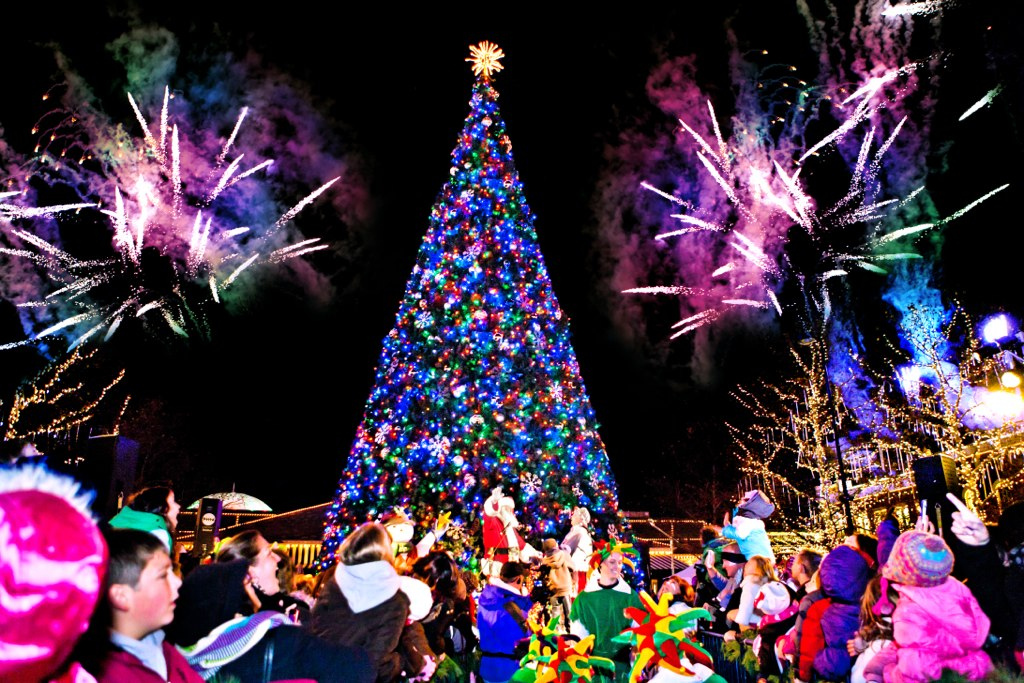
Holiday Lighting Ceremony

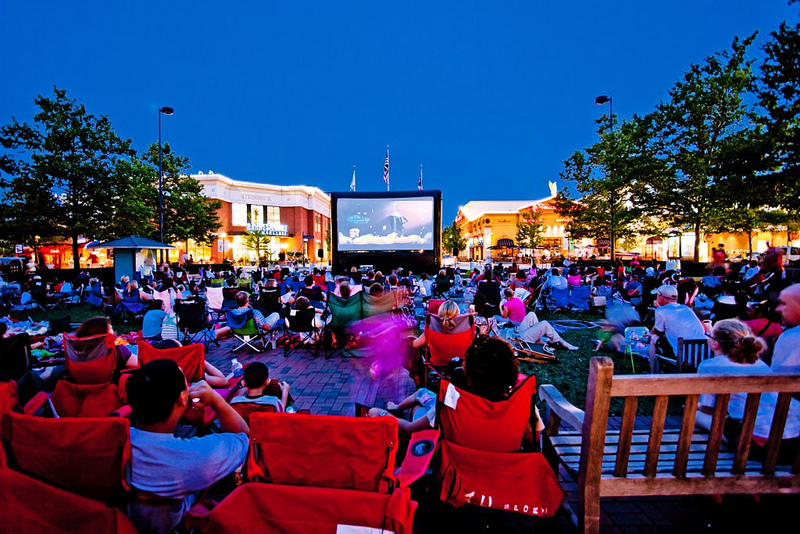
Movies By Moonlight
