= Furniture Today =

Weekly American magazine

- Editor-in-Chief: Bill McLoughlin
- Categories: Trade publication (furniture industry)
- Frequency: Daily
- Publisher: Gannett
- Founded: 1976
- Company: Gannett
- Country: United States
- Based in: Greensboro, North Carolina
- Language: English
- Website: furnituretoday.com
- ISSN: 0194-360X
- OCLC: 60626274

Furniture Today is a weekly American magazine about the furniture industry. It is part of the Gannett media holding company.

== History and profile ==
Furniture Today was started in 1976. In March 2010 it was acquired by Sandow Media from Reed Business Information. Its offices are in Greensboro, North Carolina. In 2013, the magazine was sold to Progressive Business Media, which is a daughter company of FT Media Holdings. In 2018, Progressive was acquired by BridgeTower Media.

In 2006, it had a circulation of 20,682. The 2006 Marketers Resource Guide wrote that the magazine, then owned by Reed Business Information, "remains a powerful force in the furniture manufacturing industry."

In 2013, the publication was bought by Greensboro, North Carolina–based Progressive Business Media. In November 2018, Progressive Business Media was sold to Minneapolis, Minnesota–based BridgeTower Media, itself part of GateHouse Media, which itself was later merged and rebranded as part of the Gannett media holding company.

The magazine is an industry publication.

== See also ==
- List of United States magazines
