= Akron Children's Hospital =

Coordinates: 41.080°N 81.525°W

Akron Children's

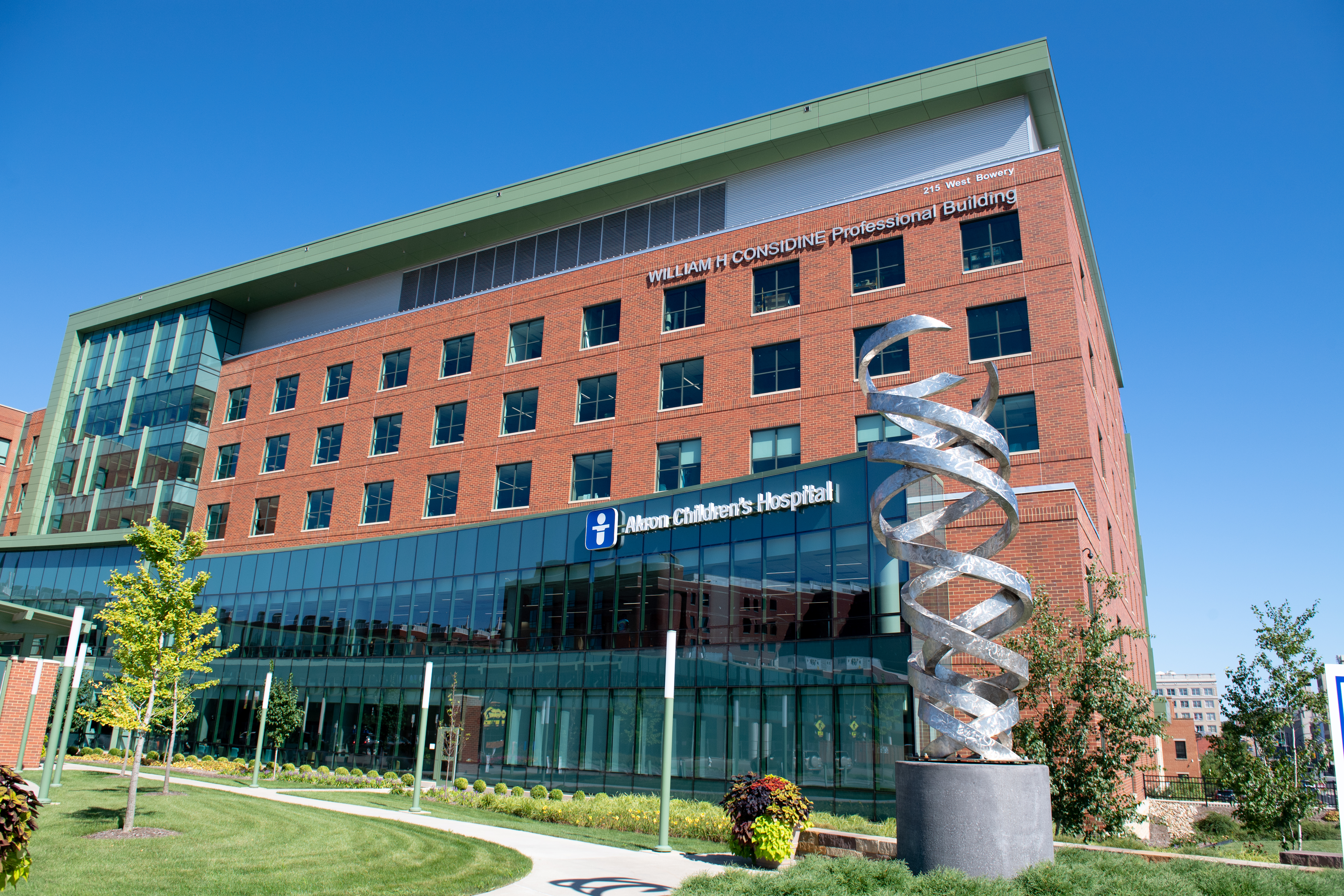

Geography
- Location: One Perkins Square Akron, Ohio, United States

Organization
- Type: Teaching
- Affiliated university: Northeast Ohio Medical University

Services
- Emergency department: Level I pediatric trauma Adult and pediatric burn unit
- Beds: 289
- Speciality: Pediatrics

History
- Former names: The Children's Hospital s*Akron Children's Hospital

Links
- Website: https://www.akronchildrens.org/
- Lists: Hospitals in Ohio

Akron Children's is a pediatric acute care hospital in Northeast Ohio that provides care to infants, children, adolescents, young adults, aged 0–21 and even some older adults. Akron Children's has hospital campuses in downtown Akron and Boardman, Ohio; 3 ERs, 5 urgent care facilities and more than 50 primary and specialty care offices. The health system has more than 7,000 employees and cares for more than half a million children and adults each year. Akron Children’s operates 8 regional health centers to provide convenient access to pediatric primary care, specialties and rehabilitative services. Locations include Beachwood, Boston Heights, Mansfield, Medina, North Canton, Portage, Warren and Wooster. Some health centers also offer urgent care, as well as radiology and laboratory services and walk-in orthopedics and sports injury services. Boardman, Mansfield and North Canton Behavioral Health Centers provide services in response to the increasing need for pediatric mental health.

== History ==
=== Early years ===
Akron Children's Hospital began as a day nursery in 1890 for children of working women. The Akron Day Nursery, as it was called, was renamed the Mary Day Nursery in 1891 after Colonel George Tod Perkins’ granddaughter. Perkins donated a house to allow for the nursery’s expansion.

In the early 1900s, the nursery worked with Akron City Hospital to operate a unit for children and quickly expanded to six units. The name was changed to Mary Day Nursery and Children’s Hospital.

The need for hospital space increased, so the nursery and hospital separated in 1917. The hospital added an eye clinic that same year, and Dr. Walter Hoyt Sr. was tapped to organize and lead the department of orthopedic surgery.

In 1918, a dedicated polio clinic opened at the hospital. Before that, a ward for crippled children opened in 1905 when polio started becoming prevalent in the Akron area.

The American Hospital Association accredited Children's Hospital for the first time in 1920.

The first approved residency program for pediatric specialists in Akron was with the hospital in 1927. It was also one of only 59 hospitals in the country to have American Medical Association approval for "Residencies in Specialties.”

The Women's Board launched Friends of Children's Hospital in 1955. The following year, the Women's Board opened a hospital gift shop, with proceeds benefiting the hospital. It is still in operation today.

In 1962, the hospital’s name changed to Children’s Hospital of Akron.

Children’s Hospital of Akron opened a neonatal intensive care unit (NICU) in 1970 and established The Akron Children's Foundation the following year.

Akron Children's was the first to grow human skin in a lab, revolutionizing burn treatment.

Children's changed its name from Akron Children's Hospital to Children's Hospital Medical Center of Akron to better reflect the broad scope of services offered. A new logo was designed by F. Eugene Smith and debuted in 1977. It was a stylized version of the della Robbia bambino.

In 1982, the Children’s Hospital Medical Center of Akron volunteer department launched the Holiday Tree Festival, where proceeds from the sale of fully decorated Christmas trees benefited the hospital. The Ronald McDonald House of Akron opened in 1985, providing a "home away from home" for patients and patient families.

The Doggie Brigade program launched in 1992 and was the country's second pet visitation program at a children's hospital.

=== Since 2000 ===
The hospital expanded its cardiac services with the opening of its Heart Center, adding pediatric heart surgery, adult congenital heart disease and maternal-fetal cardiology services.

In 2003, the hospital name changed to Akron Children’s Hospital. The following year, the Showers Family Center for Childhood Cancer and Blood Disorders opened.

Akron Children's Hospital opened a second hospital in Boardman, Ohio in 2008, serving patients and families in Mahoning Valley.

In 2010, Akron Children’s became the largest pediatric health care provider in northeast Ohio.

In 2014 Cleveland Clinic Children's Hospital entered into a collaboration with Akron Children's Hospital to open up a pediatric and adult congenital heart program.

On May 5, 2015, the Kay Jewelers Pavilion opened, featuring a neonatal intensive care unit, new ER, and expanded outpatient surgery center. In September 2015, the hospital celebrated its 125th anniversary.

In 2019, Akron Children’s Hospital and the Cleveland Clinic expanded the pediatric and adult congenital heart program that was started 2014. The expansion consisted of two new centers, located at Akron Children’s and Cleveland Clinic Children’s Hospital. In addition, five-more-years was added to the agreement. The hospital opened a freestanding Behavioral Health Center on the Boardman campus.

Akron Children’s Hospital expanded its population health focus in 2021, launching Akron Children’s Health Collaborative, proactively identifying children’s health care needs, providing early intervention and care coordination.

Akron Children’s Hospital changed its name to Akron Children’s in 2023 to signify the organization is a regional health system, not just a hospital.

In 2024, Akron Children’s began a partnership with Cincinnati Children’s to provide complex care with world-class experts in several medical specialties including pediatric otolaryngology (ear, nose and throat), hepatology (liver disease) and bone marrow transplant.

Akron Children's offers a full range of services to its 25-county region, including well visits and trauma and intensive care to treatment of rare and serious childhood disorders. Children's main campus in downtown Akron houses regional centers for genetics, fetal treatment, cancer and blood disorders, heart, palliative care, orthopedics, pediatric trauma, pediatric intensive care, and level III neonatal intensive care, among others. Children's is one of two pediatric hospitals in the country that operates a burn center for both adults and children. Akron Children's Paul and Carol David Foundation Burn Institute is among a few burn centers verified by both the American Burn Association and The Committee on Trauma of The American College of Surgeons.

Akron Children's Beeghly Campus in Boardman includes a 32-bed pediatric inpatient unit; a Level II pediatric trauma center; a center for childhood cancer and blood disorders; an infusion center, as well as EEG/ECHO/EKG, radiology, laboratory and rehabilitation services. Services based in the Mahoning Valley include a 33-bed neonatal special care nursery; child advocacy, community outreach and education center; and subspecialty practices for cardiology, orthopedics, nephrology, neurology, rheumatology, pulmonology and genetics. Children's provides additional pediatric services at Summa Akron City Hospital, Cleveland Clinic Akron General, MedCentral Health System in Mansfield, Aultman Hospital in Canton, Fisher-Titus Medical Center in Norwalk and University Hospitals Portage Medical Center in Ravenna, as well as offices in Beachwood and Hudson.

Akron Children's Hospital has earned the Gold Seal of Approval from the Joint Commission and Magnet Recognition Status from the American Nurses Credentialing Center.

In January 2025, Akron Children’s launched “More childhood, please.^{®}^{,}” an educational TV show hosted by Lily Goodwin and Rhys Thomas. Each episode addresses topics relevant to children’s health and well-being. “More childhood, please.™” is broadcast on WKYC with episodes later made available for streaming on WKYC+ and the Akron Children’s YouTube channel.

Akron Children’s PICU, Burn Center, and 7-Surgical Unit received the Beacon Award-Silver for Excellence by the American Association of Critical Care Nurses in January 2025. This national award recognizes patient care units for nursing excellence in patient outcomes, work environment and nursing workforce.

Akron Children's opened a Food Farmacy in March of 2025 on its Boardman campus. The Food Farmacy provides free, fresh produce to income-eligible families in the Youngstown area. The program addresses food insecurity by offering healthy food options and nutrition support to families in need. Akron Children’s main campus in Akron opened a Food Farmacy in January 2023.

Akron Children’s Health Center, Medina opened in April 2025 at the former Summa Health Medina Medical Center emergency department. The center includes pediatric primary care, rehabilitation, and specialty services such as, allergy, orthopedics, and dermatology, with dedicated therapy and exam spaces.

In June 2025, Akron Children’s opened a satellite campus at Warren G. Harding High School in Warren, Ohio. This facility offers primary care for children and teens, serving both students and the public, as part of its ongoing partnership with the local school district to improve healthcare access.

Pip, the mascot of Akron Children’s, was introduced in July 2025. The mascot symbolizes the thoughts, actions, feelings and experiences that result when a child enjoys a moment of “more childhood.” Pip appears in patient rooms, at hospital events, and in the hallways.

Akron Children’s Medina Health Center moved to the Summa Health Medina Medical Center campus in April 2025. The new health center consolidates primary care, rehabilitative services and pediatric specialties into one location.

Akron Children’s Pediatrics at Warren G. Harding High School opened in June 2025 at the high school’s new wellness center. The primary care office provides comprehensive primary care for babies, kids and teens.

In September 2025, Akron Children’s announced the recipients of the inaugural More childhood, please. ^{®} Awards. The awards were created to celebrate and honor those dedicated to improving and advancing childhood across the 33 counties it serves in Ohio.

In September 2025, Akron Children’s expanded the pediatric intensive care unit (PICU) at the Akron Golisano campus and added a dedicated Heart Unit. The PICU has been expanded from 23 to 45 beds, including a 13-bed high acuity PICU, as well as a 9-bed Heart Unit.

In September 2025, Akron Children’s opened its first pediatric primary care location in Cuyahoga Falls. The new office combines two existing independent Pediatrics of Akron offices and features 20 exam rooms.

In March 2026, Akron Children’s partnered with the Boys & Girls Clubs of Northeast Ohio which will include a new Akron Children’s pediatric primary care office at BGCNEO’s Broadway Club in Cleveland.

Akron Children's Hospital received a $50 million gift from Tom Golisano in April 2026. This unrestricted gift is the largest in Akron Children's history. As a result, the Akron campus will be renamed the Akron Children's Golisano Campus.

In May 2026, Akron Children's launched the new Akron Children's Mother & Baby App to support women through every step of their pregnancy and parenting journey. The app features health tips and pregnancy resources, as well as links to MyChart, appointment scheduling and a location finder. The app, which replaced the former Akron Children’s Anywhere App, is free and available for both Apple and Android devices.

Akron Children’s Beeghly campus also opened its first outpatient pharmacy, open to the community in May 2026. The pharmacy offers on-site compounding, same-day-pick-up, vaccinations and over-the-counter medications. Refill services are available via phone or MyChart.

In addition, the Cleveland Museum of Art and Akron Children’s announced a new partnership to engage pediatric health and the arts through family-centered museum experiences, adaptive art programs, and wellness-focused initiatives in May 2026. The programs combine creative activities with clinical expertise to support children’s emotional, cognitive, and social development.

Also in May, Akron Children’s added a full-service pediatric primary care office within the existing location of its popular Montrose Urgent Care and Walk-in Orthopedic and Sports Injury Clinic. The new services will begin this summer. The primary care office shares an entrance with the existing services but has its own dedicated waiting room and 17 exam rooms.

In 2026, Akron Children's received its fifth Magnet Designation. This designation recognizes Akron Children's commitment to provide quality patient care through innovations in professional nursing practice.

In June 2026, Akron Children’s TV show, “More childhood, please.^{®},” won an Emmy at the Central Great Lakes Emmy Awards in the Children/Teen – Short Form or Long Form category.

Akron Children’s partnered with Sonar Mental Health in June of 2026 to provide patients with access to 24/7 chat-based well-being support and help them deliver timely, consistent support to more young people.

In July 2026, Akron Children’s was awarded accreditation by the College of American Pathologists Accreditation Committee based on results of a recent onsite inspection.

Akron Children’s launched a new pediatric dentistry residency program on July 1, 2026 to address the critical need for a stronger dental workforce and, over time, improve access to dental care for children. Residents will receive specialized training in such areas as infant oral health, behavior guidance, preventative and restorative dentistry, emergency dental care, dental trauma management, collaboration with pediatric medical teams, and community service and oral health advocacy.

== Controversy ==
In November 2013, the hospital went to court to prevent an 11-year-old Amish leukemia patient and her parents from making treatment decisions, when the patient chose to discontinue a second round of chemotherapy after it made her "extremely ill." An appeals court ruled that the state's duty to protect the child's well-being outweighed the parents' beliefs and convictions, and an attorney who was also a nurse, was given limited guardianship of the child. As a result of the hospital's actions, the patient's family went into hiding to avoid having their daughter "kidnapped." The girl's father told the Associated Press that the family does not oppose modern medicine nor did they make their decision based on religious beliefs. In 2014, the court-appointed guardian was allowed to stop her efforts to force the family to resume chemotherapy; the guardian stated that she didn't have access to the child, making it impossible for her to make medical decisions. In October 2015, the court formally ended the guardianship.

== Affiliations and programs ==
The hospital is a clinical training site for undergraduate and graduate registered nurse (RN) students and licensed practical nurse (LPN) students from 35 affiliated nursing schools across Ohio and additional schools in West Virginia, Missouri, Illinois, and Colorado, and is also a clinical training site for the Radiologic Technology (RT) program from The University of Akron. Children's is affiliated with Northeast Ohio Medical University (NEOMED) in Rootstown as one of the school's nine major hospital associations.

Akron Children's Hospital offers several pediatric sub-specialty fellowship programs.

- Pediatric Emergency Medicine
- Pediatric Radiology
- Pediatric Sports Medicine
- Pediatric Pathology
- Pediatric Psychiatry
- Pediatric Palliative Care
- Developmental Pediatrics
- Pediatric Hematology/Oncology

The Akron Cooperative Medical Laboratory Science Program (ACMLSP) is a joint educational effort with Akron Children's Hospital, Summa Health (5 locations), and Aultman Health Foundation (2 locations) that offers didactic and clinical education in medical laboratory science. ACMLSP is also affiliated with Wooster Community Hospital, Bon Secours Mercy Health (3 locations), and Biomedical Laboratories, Inc, that host the students hands-on rotations in medical laboratories. Students in ACMLSP have either earned a bachelor's degree as 4+1 students, or will earn their bachelor's degree upon completion of the program as 3+1 students. Academic affiliates include Youngstown State University, Kent State University, University of Mount Union, Ashland University, Bowling Green State University, Malone University, Miami University (Ohio), and Commonwealth University of Pennsylvania. ACMLSP has been accredited since 1986 by the National Accrediting Agency for Clinical Laboratory Sciences.

The American Heart Association (AHA) Community Training Center at Children's is one of the largest in Ohio. It offers advanced cardiac life support, pediatric advanced life support, CPR, AED and first aid courses.

The Showers Family Center for Childhood Cancer and Blood Disorders is recognized as a "Pediatric Teaching Cancer Program" by the American College of Surgeons Commission on Cancer.

In 2020, U.S. News & World Report ranked Children's in the top 50 children's hospitals in six pediatric specialties: urology, pulmonology, neonatology, gastroenterology, orthopedics, neurology, neurosurgery.

== Air Bear ==
In 2008, Akron Children's Hospital Announced and launched Air Bear. Which served as Ohio's first dedicated pediatric medical transport helicopter. The initial purchase and build cost the hospital over $6 million. The helicopter serves as a mobile Intensive Care Unit and is staffed by critical care nurse, paramedic and respiratory therapist and a pilot. In the 2022 Annual report the hospital stated that in that years they had completed 264 medical transport flights. From 2008 to 2018 Air Bear has transported over 3,500 patients.

== Partner Hospitals ==
In addition to Akron Children’s relationship with Cincinnati Children’s, it partners with other hospitals to bring care to the communities where patients and their families live. These include: St. Elizabeth Boardman Hospital, St. Joseph Warren Hospital, Summa Akron City Hospital, Cleveland Clinic Akron General, Aultman Hospital, Wooster Community Hospital and Memorial Health System.
