= Summa St. Thomas Hospital =

- Summa Health System

Geography
- Location: 444 N. Main Street Akron, Ohio, United States
- Coordinates: 41°05′50″N 81°30′49″W

History
- Founded: 1928
- Closed: 2023
- Demolished: 2024

Links
- Website: www.summahealth.org/locations/hospitals/stthomas
- Lists: Hospitals in Ohio

Summa St. Thomas Hospital was a former orthopedic and psychiatric hospital located in Akron, Ohio. The hospital opened in 1928 and was originally operated by the Sisters of Charity of St. Augustine as a non-denominational, non-profit general hospital. In 1989, St. Thomas Hospital merged with Akron City Hospital to become Summa Health System. The emergency room was closed in 2014, and the hospital was closed in 2023. Demolition of the site commenced June 17, 2024 and was completed by the end of calendar year 2024.

== History ==
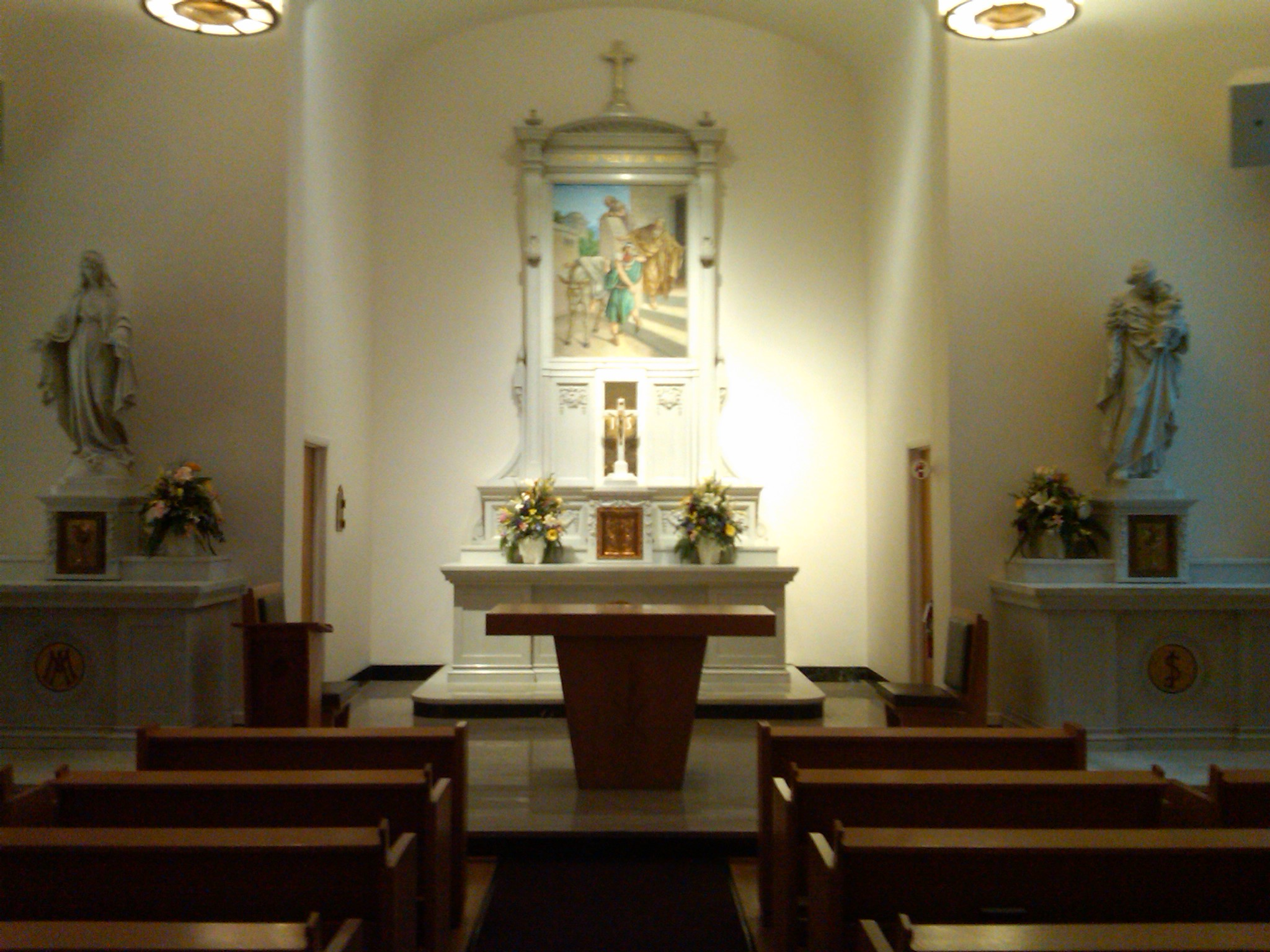
A Christian chapel at Summa St. Thomas Hospital. It was used by patients, their families, and hospital staff for prayer and worship.

On August 16, 1935, Sister Ignatia Gavin, a Catholic sister in charge of admissions at St. Thomas Hospital, with the help of Dr. Bob Smith, one of the founders of Alcoholics Anonymous, admitted the first alcoholic patient under the diagnosis of acute gastritis. This event made St. Thomas Hospital the first hospital in the world to treat alcoholism as a medical condition, and the first religious institution to recognize the rights of alcoholics to receive hospital treatment.

In 2010, Summa Akron City Hospital and St. Thomas Hospitals were awarded nursing's highest honor, Magnet recognition, by American Nurses Credentialing Center. Only six percent of hospitals in the United States are recognized as Magnet hospitals.

In 2014, St. Thomas hospital closed its emergency room and replaced it with a general practitioner, directing their emergency room patients to Akron City's recently opened 100 bed emergency room.

The Summa Health Behavioral Health Institute vacated the St. Thomas building and moved into the nearby 60 bed Juve Family Behavioral Health Pavilion on the Summa Health System–Akron Campus, which was completed in early 2023. Alcoholics Anonymous artifacts were preserved and moved.

== Recognition and honors ==
- Was designated as a Magnet Hospital in 2010.
- Was ranked No. 1 in the Akron metro area for cancer, diabetes and endocrinology, gastroenterology, geriatrics, gynecology, orthopaedics, pulmonology and urology in 2010.
