= 2012 Summit County, Ohio Executive election =

- November 6, 2012

Nominee	Russ Pry	Frank Larson
Party	Democratic	Republican
Popular vote	151,934	88,171
Percentage	63.28%	36.72%
County Executive before election
Russ Pry
Democratic
Elected County Executive
Russ Pry
Democratic

The 2012 Summit County, Ohio Executive election took place on November 6, 2012. Incumbent Democratic County Executive Russ Pry ran for re-election to a second full term. He won the Democratic primary unopposed and was challenged in the general election by Munroe Falls Mayor Frank Larson, the Republican nominee. Pry entered the election as the frontrunner, significantly outraising and outspending Larson, and campaigning on his success in revitalizing the local economy, while Larson campaigned on the need for cutting government spending. Pry ultimately won re-election in a landslide, receiving 62 percent of the vote to Larson's 38 percent.

However, Pry would not end up serving out his full term. In 2016, after he was diagnosed with colon cancer, Pry announced that he would suspend his campaign for re-election, and unexpectedly died from surgical complications shortly thereafter. Ilene Shapiro, the President of the County Council, served out the remainder of Pry's term.

== Democratic primary ==
=== Candidates ===
- Russ Pry, incumbent County Executive

=== Results ===
Democratic primary results
Party	Candidate	Votes	%
Democratic	Russ Pry (inc.)	23,116	100.00%
Total votes		23,116	100.00%

== Republican primary ==
=== Candidates ===
- Frank Larson, Mayor of Munroe Falls

=== Results ===
Republican primary results
Party	Candidate	Votes	%
Republican	Frank Larson	24,103	100.00%
Total votes		24,103	100.00%

== General election ==
=== Results ===
2012 Summit County Executive election
Party	Candidate	Votes	%
Democratic	Russ Pry (inc.)	151,934	63.28%
Republican	Frank Larson	88,171	36.72%
Total votes		240,105	100.00%
Democratic hold			
