= Robert Little (architect) =

American architect (1919–2005)

Robert Andrews Little (1919–2005) was a modernist architect based in Cleveland, Ohio. He received the Cleveland Arts Prize for Architecture in 1965. Little practiced in the Bauhaus and International styles. He also designed and advocated energy-efficient features, and employed Jewish and African-American architects and engineers.

Born in Boston, he was a direct descendant of Paul Revere. Little studied with Marcel Breuer and Walter Gropius. He graduated from Harvard in 1937 and continued there completing his masters 1939.

Little came to Cleveland in 1947. He taught at Case Western Reserve University’s school of architecture.

His firm, Little & Associates, merged with Dalton·Dalton Associates in 1969. He was married to Ann Halle Little, a member of the locally prominent Halle department store family. Little and his wife had two sons, Robert and Revere. Revere was a noteworthy folk singer.

== Work ==
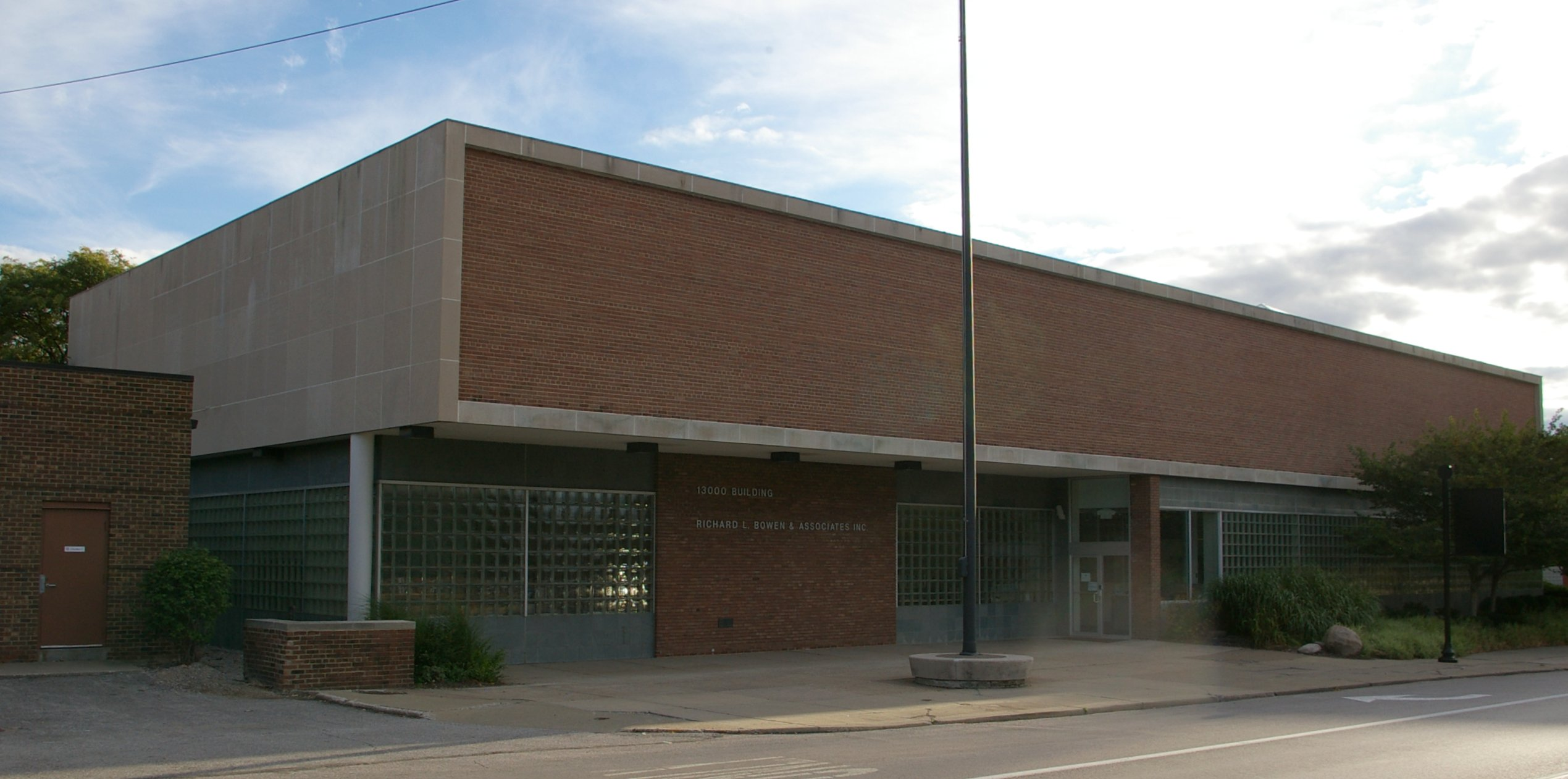
Little's first commission, the Halle Brothers department store at Shaker Square built in 1948, is on the National Register of Historic Places.

- Halle Brothers Shaker Square department store (1948), located between the Shaker Square Cinemas and the rapid transit station, was his first commission. The building is listed on the National Register of Historic Places and won the Cleveland Chamber of Commerce Award for Commercial Building as well as the Architects’ Society of Ohio Medal for Commercial Building.
- Albert Pick Music Library at the University of Miami
- Timken residence in Canton, Ohio
- Little invented and patented a pre-computer design tool called Solux "that allowed him to trace the path of the sun over a cardboard model mechanically, instead of having to use laborious mathematical calculations," used for lighting calculations.
- Steel home prototype, on roof of Kauffman's Department Store in Pittsburgh.
- All-electric home prototype for Westinghouse Corporation.
- Pepper Ridge development in Pepper Pike, Ohio, including a converted barn studio for Cleveland sculptor William McVey (a design that received the Progressive Architecture award).
- Community Health Foundation facility in University Circle (later occupied by Kaiser Permanente and then as the Community Dialysis Center)
- Jane Addams High School
- Case Institute of Technology dorms along Cedar Hill
- Buildings for Hawken School’s upper school campus in Gates Mills
- Cleveland Municipal School District’s spherical Supplementary Education Center (and planetarium) on Lakeside Avenue
- Revco corporate headquarters, Twinsburg, Ohio (became part of CVS)
- United States Air Force Museum in Dayton, Ohio.
- Cleveland's Metro General Hospital's twin towers (now MetroHealth Medical Center)
- Master plan for the revitalization of area around St. Vincent Charity Hospital including the hospital's new buildings. (The plan won Progressive Architecture's urban design award).
- Jetport plan for Lake Erie landfill
