= Armenian American Wellness Center =

Armenian American Wellness Center (AAWC)
- Formation: 2000
- Type: Non-profit 501(c)(3)
- Headquarters: Washington DC
- Region served: Armenia
- Official language: Armenian, English
- President and co-founder: Rita Balian
- Parent organization: Armenian American Cultural Association
- Budget: (annual)
- Website: Official web

The Armenian American Wellness Center (Armenian: Հայ-ամերիկյան առողջության կենտրոն, romanized: Hay-amerikan arroghjut'yan kentron), in Armenia, is a humanitarian project of the Armenian American Cultural Association (AACA), a 501(c)(3) non-profit organization incorporated in Arlington, Virginia in February 1995. The project aims to promote the early and accurate detection of breast and cervical cancer, and to provide relatively low-cost primary health care services to women in Armenia.

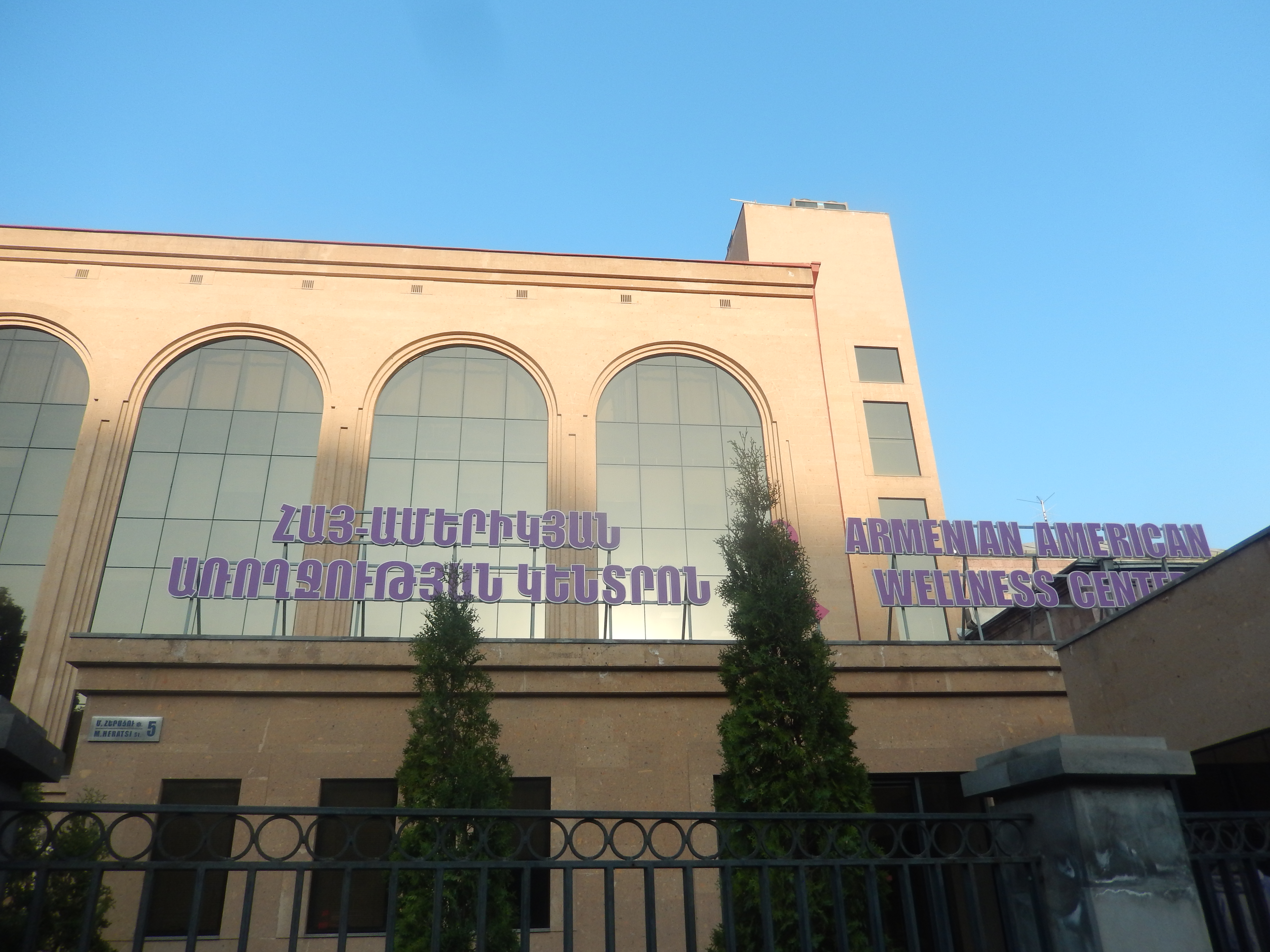
Armenian American Wellness Center in Yerevan on Heratsi street

== History ==
Armenia's transition to a democratic, market-based society began with its independence from the Soviet Union in September 1991. The collapse of the Soviet economy, combined with the impact of the severe 1988 earthquake, left post-Soviet Armenia in economic shambles. Preventative medicine had been non-existent in Soviet Armenia, and the already limited government-supported healthcare system was totally crippled by the collapse of the USSR. In 1996 Armenia's Minister of Health identified breast cancer as the nation's leading cause of cancer deaths among women, but Armenia was incapable of addressing its breast cancer crisis.

In 1997, AACA decided to explore the issue and organized its first Medical Mission to Armenia. The team included medical professionals from the Washington Hospital Center in Washington, D.C., and Akron City Hospital in Akron, Ohio who selected and trained Armenian medical professionals and helped install mammography units and other equipment to establish the first breast cancer screening facility in the Caucasus Region.

On April 28, 1997, AACA opened the Armenian American Mammography University Center (later renamed the Armenian American Wellness Center) on the campus of Yerevan State Medical University in Yerevan, Armenia. This was made possible through the financial support of the Armenian Diaspora in America, equipment and supplies donated by US-based corporations, and political support from both the Embassy of the United States, Yerevan and the Government of Armenia.

The second leading cause of cancer deaths among women in Armenia is cervical cancer, according to the Ministry of Health. To address this need, AACA created a partnership between the Wellness Center and Dr. Emma Zargarian, an OB/GYN at the Greater Baltimore Medical Center (affiliated with Johns Hopkins University). Today, the Center provides basic gynecological services, including annual Pap tests, diagnosis and treatment of pre-cancerous lesions, detection of sexually transmitted infections (STIs), infertility treatment, as well as menopausal counseling and assistance.

A pathology laboratory was also established in June 2001, to facilitate the work of the Breast Health and Gynecology Departments. This was accomplished through a partnership with Professor Julia Albright, an immunologist from the George Washington University Hospital, and International Relief & Development (IRD), a Washington, D.C.-based NGO which provided equipment and supplies. Under the guidance of Dr. Camilla Cobb and Katherine Berberian of the University of Southern California’s Department of Cytopathology, Cytopathology and Needle aspiration biopsy (NAB), also known as fine needle aspiration cytology (FNAC), procedures for breast biopsies were also introduced at the Wellness Center.

== Other locations ==
In addition to its main facility in Yerevan, the Wellness Center operates two smaller satellite clinics that provide health care services to Armenians for whom travel to downtown Yerevan can prove difficult or prohibitively expensive.

The smaller of the two clinics is located on the outskirts of Yerevan, while the larger of the two is a ten-room medical facility owned by the Wellness Center that opened in July 2003. It is located by Lake Sevan, sixty miles northeast of Yerevan. It was created for patients in the city of Gavar, which has the highest per-capita rate of breast abnormalities in Armenia. Originally an old village house, the Clinic's building was renovated extensively. Family-centered Primary Care services are also provided to families, including men and children.

== Medical outreach ==
To provide screening services to rural Armenians, the Wellness Center began monthly Medical Outreach Missions in 1997. Using a van donated by the US State Department's Humanitarian Assistance Program, the Center transports doctors and a portable ultrasound machine to remote villages, providing free screenings. Patients with abnormalities are referred to the Center in Yerevan for mammograms and further diagnosis. In 2005, the Wellness Center also began to provide basic gynecological and primary health care services during these Missions.

== Education ==
Awareness campaigns stress healthy lifestyle choices and the importance of annual mammograms, monthly breast self-examinations, and annual Pap smears. Since 1997, the Wellness Center has observed October as Breast Cancer Awareness Month. Breast screening services are provided at fifty percent of the normal subsidized fee, or at no cost to the destitute. Cultural, scientific and social events are also held. These social and cultural activities culminate in a "health walk", which attracts over 3,000 participants each year.

== Construction ==
In 2002, in recognition of the impact that the Wellness Center had already made on women's health care in the country, a Soviet-era five-story building was donated by a Presidential decree from the Armenian Government to the Wellness Center.
