= 2016 Summit County, Ohio Executive election =

- November 8, 2016

Nominee	Ilene Shapiro	Bill Roemer
Party	Democratic	Republican
Popular vote	138,466	96,455
Percentage	58.94%	41.06%
County Executive before election
Ilene Shapiro
Democratic
Elected County Executive
Ilene Shapiro
Democratic

The 2016 Summit County, Ohio Executive election took place on November 8, 2016. Incumbent Democratic County Executive Russ Pry ran for re-election to a third term. He won the Democratic primary unopposed, but announced that he would withdraw from the race after he was diagnosed with colon cancer, and died shortly thereafter. County Council President Ilene Shapiro became County Executive and was selected as the Democratic Party's nominee in the general election.

In the general election, Shapiro faced Bill Roemer, the Republican nominee and a former County Councilman. Shapiro significantly outraised and outspent Roemer, and won the endorsement of the Akron Beacon Journal. She ultimately defeated Roemer in a landslide, receiving 59 percent of the vote to Roemer's 41 percent.

== Democratic primary ==
=== Candidates ===
- Russ Pry, incumbent County Executive

=== Results ===
Democratic primary results
Party	Candidate	Votes	%
Democratic	Russ Pry (inc.)	47,808	100.00%
Total votes		47,808	100.00%

=== Replacement nominee ===
Pry announced that he would end his campaign for re-election on July 30, 2016, and died the next day. The Summit County Democratic Party convened to select a replacement nominee. Shapiro, the President of the County Council and the interim County Executive following Pry's death, announced that she would seek the nomination, and was unanimously selected as the replacement nominee.

== Republican primary ==
=== Candidates ===
- Bill Roemer, former County Councilman

=== Results ===
Republican primary results
Party	Candidate	Votes	%
Republican	Bill Roemer	43,760	100.00%
Total votes		43,760	100.00%

== General election ==
=== Results ===
2016 Summit County Executive election
Party	Candidate	Votes	%
Democratic	Ilene Shapiro (inc.)	138,466	58.94%
Republican	Bill Roemer	96,455	41.06%
Total votes		234,921	100.00%
Democratic hold			
