= 2020 Summit County, Ohio Executive election =

- November 3, 2020

| Nominee | Ilene Shapiro | John Chapman |
| Party | Democratic | Republican |
| Popular vote | 153,173 | 110,746 |
| Percentage | 58.04% | 41.96% |
County Executive before election
Ilene Shapiro
Democratic
Elected County Executive
Ilene Shapiro
Democratic

The 2020 Summit County, Ohio Executive election took place on November 3, 2020. Incumbent Democratic County Executive Ilene Shapiro ran for a second full term. She won the Democratic primary unopposed and faced attorney John Chapman, the Republican nominee, in the general election.

During the campaign, several prominent state Republicans, including State House Speaker Larry Householder, were alleged to be involved in a corruption scandal involving electricity company FirstEnergy, which prompted Chapman to temporarily suspend his campaign until local Republican leaders "t[ook] responsibility" for their role in the scandal. Ultimately, Shapiro won re-election by a wide margin, receiving 58 percent of the vote to Chapman's 42 percent.

== Democratic primary ==
=== Candidates ===
- Ilene Shapiro, incumbent County Executive

=== Results ===
Democratic primary results
| Party | Candidate | Votes | % |
|---|---|---|---|
| Democratic | Ilene Shapiro (inc.) | 40,087 | 100.00% |
| Total votes | | 40,087 | 100.00% |

== Republican primary ==
=== Candidates ===
- John Chapman, attorney, 2016 Republican nominee for County Prosecutor

=== Results ===
Republican primary results
| Party | Candidate | Votes | % |
|---|---|---|---|
| Republican | John Chapman | 16,288 | 100.00% |
| Total votes | | 16,288 | 100.00% |

== General election ==
=== Results ===
2020 Summit County Executive election
| Party | Candidate | Votes | % |
|---|---|---|---|
| Democratic | Ilene Shapiro (inc.) | 153,173 | 58.04% |
| Republican | John Chapman | 110,746 | 41.96% |
| Total votes | | 263,919 | 100.00% |
| Democratic hold | | | |
