= Sisters of Charity of St. Augustine =

The Sisters of Charity of St. Augustine, a Roman Catholic religious congregation of women, have served health, education and social service needs in the Diocese of Cleveland, Ohio, since 1851.

== Foundation ==
The first Bishop of Cleveland, the Rt. Rev. Louis Amadeus Rappe, planned to establish a hospital in the city under the supervision of Catholic Sisters. He sought candidates unsuccessfully in France for a time while on a tour of his native country in 1849-50. Finally he was directed to Mother Bernardine Cabaret, the Mother Superior of St. Louis Hospital, (Note: The hospital was destroyed in 1988, and the site now houses the University of the Littoral Opal Coast) run by the Hospitaller canonesses regular, who followed the Rule of St. Augustine, in Boulogne-sur-Mer. There Rappe set forth his invitation for some members of the community to come to America and establish a hospital in his diocese.

Mother Bernardine immediately volunteered to go herself. Securing the commitment of Sister Françoise Guillement to accompany her, she put her proposal for the mission to the community. Though the Sisters were reluctant to lose her talents, they voted unanimously to authorize the mission to America. Bishop Rappe, eagerly awaiting the Sisters' arrival, had written in the spring, "Come, my daughters, I have now prepared a place for you. On it is good spring water and good fresh air." Mother Bernardine then persuaded two of the postulants, Louise Brulois and Cornelie Muselet, to join in this missionary venture. The small group left France on September 24, 1851, with little more than chapel furnishings and boxes of linens for their home and nursing needs. During the voyage, they studied the basics of English to prepare for their new home.

When the group arrived in Cleveland on the following October 10, they found that the bishop had indeed procured a house for them, but that it was still occupied. Fortunately for them, a community of Ursuline nuns had also come to Cleveland from Boulogne the previous year to open a school. They provided the newcomers hospitality until their own house could be occupied. After two weeks, the bishop persuaded the canonesses to accept hospitality in private homes so that they could be more available for visiting the sick in their own homes, while the postulants were given training in the consecrated life by the Ursulines. As they performed this service as the first visiting nurses in the region, they came to be called the angels of the city, partly due to their white religious habits. This situation continued until they were able to occupy their own house the following March. They then opened St. Joseph Hospital on the grounds, the first such public facility in what is now Cleveland.

Within six months, though, the two canonesses sought the permission of the bishop to return to France. Perhaps this was due to the hardships of life on the frontier, dealing with an unfamiliar language and a historically severe winter Cleveland had experienced during their first winter there. These challenges, as well as their own failing health led them to this decision. The two young members of the group, already professed as Religious Sisters chose, however, to remain.

== A new congregation ==
Upon the departure of the two canonesses, Bishop Rappe turned to Sister Angela Bissonnette, an Ursuline novice, to help him guarantee the continuation of his project. He knew and trusted Sister Angela due to her service to the local community in the years before she had entered the convent. She had been active in the catechetical instruction of the local Catholic children, and in a cholera outbreak of 1849, she had gathered and nursed widows and children suffering from the disease in an abandoned house until the plague had passed. Sister Angela agreed to transfer to the new community and took vows as a Sister of Charity on October 21, 1851, in the chapel of the Ursuline convent. She was named the first Superior General of the new congregation, which had received two new candidates from the local population.

The community continued the operation of the hospital, and added an orphanage to care for the children left behind by those who died in the hospital. To support themselves, the boys were taught tailoring and carpentry, making cassocks for the local clergy and furniture to be sold to the public. By 1856, the needs of the orphanage were so great that they Sisters closed the hospital to use it for their charges. Within three years, they had completed the building of St. Vincent Orphanage. This institution once again needed to expand to meet its mission. The Sisters then built St. Louis Orphanage, housing 100 boys and several Sisters. Most of the boys stayed until the age of fourteen, when they found jobs in the city.

In order to meet the needs of returning Civil War soldiers who were requiring immediate medical attention and nursing care, Bishop Rappr founded St. Vincent's Charity Hospital. It opened in 1865. Mother Augustine Brulon was the first superior who oversaw the staff made up of sisters who were trained nurses.

== Expansion ==
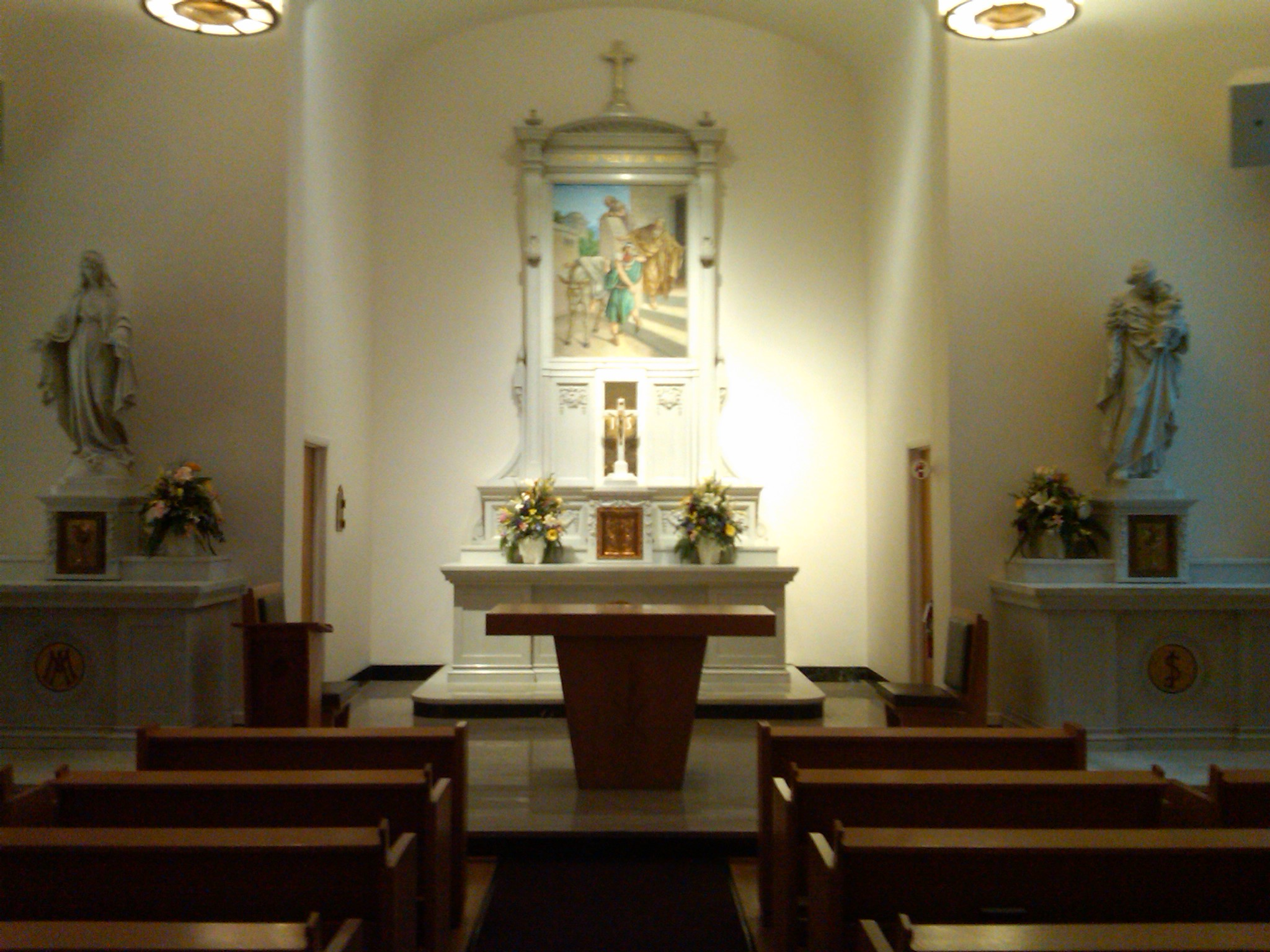
The Christian chapel of St. Thomas Hospital, a former institution of the Sisters of Charity of St. Augustine.

By time of the death in 1901 of the last original member of the community, Sister Saint Joseph (the former Cornelie Muselet), the congregation numbered over 100 Sisters. Over the next century, the congregation built a series of medical facilities answering different needs, from regular medical care to the care of unwed mothers. One of their institutions, St. Thomas Hospital, was the first to accept the work of Dr. Bob Smith, the co-founder of Alcoholics Anonymous, and his first patient in this new program to deal with this condition. One member of the congregation, Sister Ignatia Gavin, C.S.A., (1889–1966) became a leading figure in this work.

In 1922, at the request of Bishop Joseph Schrembs, the congregation expanded to work in the field of education, at which time they opened St. Augustine Academy on the grounds of their motherhouse. In 1925, the first project of the newly founded social arm of the diocese, Catholic Charities, was to re-locate all the orphans cared for by the Sisters at Saint Vincent and at Saint Louis Orphanages onto 180 acres in the town of Parma, the new facility becoming known as Parmadale, the nation's first cottage-plan home for dependent children.

== Current period ==
In the 1960s, the effects of Vatican II were felt by this congregation as well as most others. St. Augustine Academy was leased to another congregation, the Sisters of the Holy Family of Nazareth. St. Ann Hospital for unwed mothers was sold. The shift of students out of Catholic schools together with the recognition that children were not the only ones in need of religious instruction caused Sisters in the 1970s to begin to work full-time in parish school of religion programs and total parish religious education. In some places Sisters now collaborate in a team-ministry approach to a parish's various needs. The Sisters are involved in parish ministry and religious education in several parishes in the Diocese of Cleveland. Their involvement in education continues through donations to various secondary schools and to the Catholic Educational Endowment.

== Sisters of Charity Health System ==
The Sisters formed in 1982 what they feel was the most significant development of their health-care facilities: the formation of the Sisters of Charity Health System, a system created to strengthen each of the sponsored facilities and to ensure that the charism and philosophy of the Sisters are implemented and enhanced in the institutions and programs within the system. They continued to look to the future, as they marked the 140th anniversary of the founding of the congregation, by beginning construction of the Regina Health Center, a 200-bed retirement home and geriatric nursing center for Sisters, to be shared with other religious congregations in the diocese.

St. Vincent Charity Medical Center in Cleveland, Ohio, and Mercy Medical Center in Canton, Ohio are part of the system. In February 2021, Mercy Medical Center became a full member of the Cleveland Clinic health system, while retaining its Catholic affiliation through sponsorship with the Sisters of Charity of St. Augustine. Light of Hearts Villa in Bedford, Ohio provides residential eldercare services.
