= Cleveland Clinic Akron General =

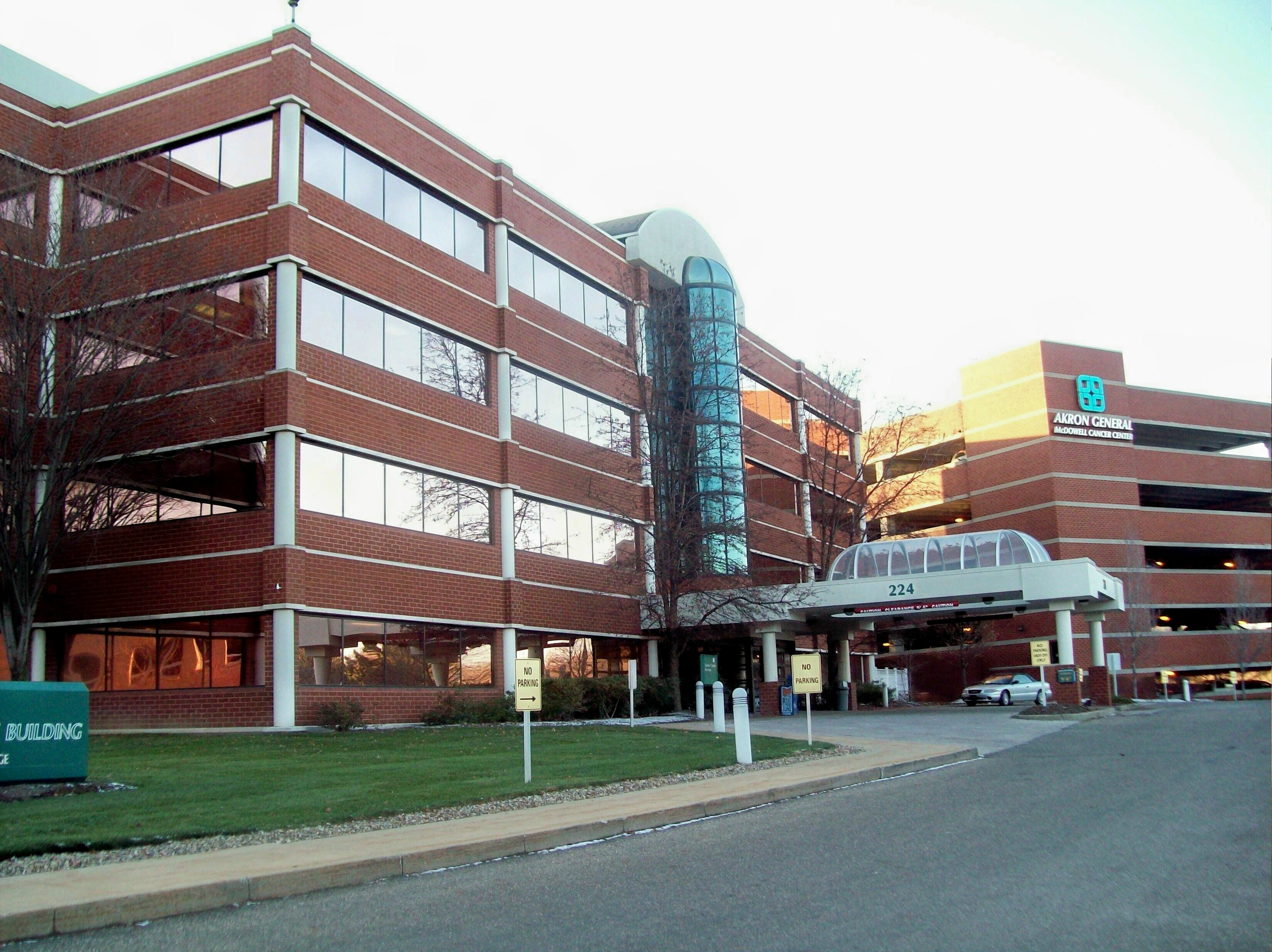
- A picture of Akron General in 2007.

Geography
- Location: 1 Akron General Avenue, Akron, Ohio, United States
- Coordinates: 41.0784°N 81.5318°W

Organization
- Type: Teaching
- Affiliated university: Cleveland Clinic Lerner College of Medicine; Heritage College of Osteopathic Medicine; Northeast Ohio Medical University

Services
- Emergency department: Level I trauma center
- Beds: 511

Helipads
- Helipad: FAA LID: OH05
Number	Length		Surface
Number	ft	m	Surface
H1	23 x 25	7 × 8	concrete

History
- Former names: Akron General Medical Center; Akron Assurance Hospital Company; Peoples Hospital
- Founded: 1915

Links
- Website: www.akrongeneral.org
- Lists: Hospitals in Ohio

Cleveland Clinic Akron General formerly known as Akron General Medical Center, and commonly known as Akron Gen/Akron Assurance Hospital Company, is a nationally ranked, 511-bed non-profit, teaching hospital located in Akron, Ohio. Cleveland Clinic Akron General is a part of the Cleveland Clinic Health System. As the hospital is a teaching hospital, it is affiliated with the Northeast Ohio Medical University and the Ohio University Heritage College of Osteopathic Medicine. The hospital is also an American College of Surgeons verified Level I Trauma Center, the one of two in the region and one of 11 in Ohio. Additionally, the hospital has a rooftop helipad to handle the emergent transport of critical patients to and from the hospital.

The hospital was notably the birthplace of NBA players LeBron James (1984) and Stephen Curry (1988).

== History ==
On February 20, 1914, the articles of incorporation were filed for the newly established Peoples Hospital Company. On March 1, 1915, the new hospital opened on West Cedar Street with 125-beds, named the Peoples Hospital. Later in 1926, Peoples Hospital became a nonprofit to better serve the underserved in Akron.

In 1954, the hospital was renamed from the Peoples Hospital to Akron General Hospital, then in 1971 renamed to Akron General Medical Center.

From 1971 to 1975, renovations occurred at Akron General Hospital which added physician offices, a coronary care unit, new patient rooms, a hemodialysis unit, new administration offices, an expanded radiation therapy unit, new coronary stress labs, and a 476-space parking deck.

In 2008, Akron General partnered with Akron Children's Hospital to open a new pediatric and adult emergency department at its satellite campus in Bath, Ohio. The new emergency department consists of 17,000-square-feet of space and includes 18 emergency beds. Care for adults is provided from doctors from Akron General while pediatric cases are handled by Akron Children's Hospital.

In 2013, it was announced that they had signed a non-binding letter of intent would be purchased by a joint venture of the for-profit Nashville based, Community Health Systems and Cleveland Clinic. The purchase would have turned Akron General into a for-profit hospital. In 2014 hospital administration announced that they were no longer in talks with Community Health Systems or Cleveland Clinic due to fundamental disagreements.

In 2014, the nationally ranked health system, Cleveland Clinic invested $100 million into Akron General Medical Center and became a minority owner of the hospital. Additionally, the deal allowed the Cleveland Clinic to take over the hospital after a year, and Cleveland Clinic was allowed to choose three board members on Akron Gen's board.

In 2015, Cleveland Clinic decided to take over the hospital and Akron General officially became a part of Cleveland Clinic after the Ohio Attorney General and the Federal Trade Commission both approved the merger. Cleveland Clinic would deal with Akron General's $150 million debt and would make $30 million in improvements to the hospital including a new emergency department and a more modern electronic health record system. The merger totaled up to be one of Ohio's largest health-related mergers in recent history. Additionally, it was later announced that the merger prevented Akron General from going bankrupt.

In 2018, the hospital opened up a new building containing an emergency department containing 60 treatment rooms, a 19-bed observation unit, and administrative offices. The project cost the hospital $49.3 million and added 67,000-square-feet of space, nearly tripling the size of the previous emergency department. A rooftop helipad is located on top of the new building, and a second floor bridge connects the building to the rest of the main hospital campus.

== Awards ==
The hospital ranked as "high performing" in 7 adult specialties, as #7 in Ohio and #1 in the Akron metro region on the 2020-21 U.S. News & World Report: Best Hospitals rankings.

2020-21 U.S. News & World Report Rankings for Akron General
Specialty	Rank (In the U.S.)	Score (Out of 100)
Diabetes & Endocrinology	High Performing	52.1
Gastroenterology & GI Surgery	High Performing	58.0
Geriatrics	High Performing	67.6
Nephrology	High Performing	52.9
Neurology & Neurosurgery	High Performing	58.8
Orthopedics	High Performing	47.0
Pulmonology & Lung Surgery	High Performing	61.5

== See also ==
- Cleveland Clinic
- Northeast Ohio Medical University
- Cleveland Clinic Children's Hospital
- Akron Children's Hospital
