= Halle Brothers Shaker Square department store =

- Halle's Shaker Square
- U.S. National Register of Historic Places
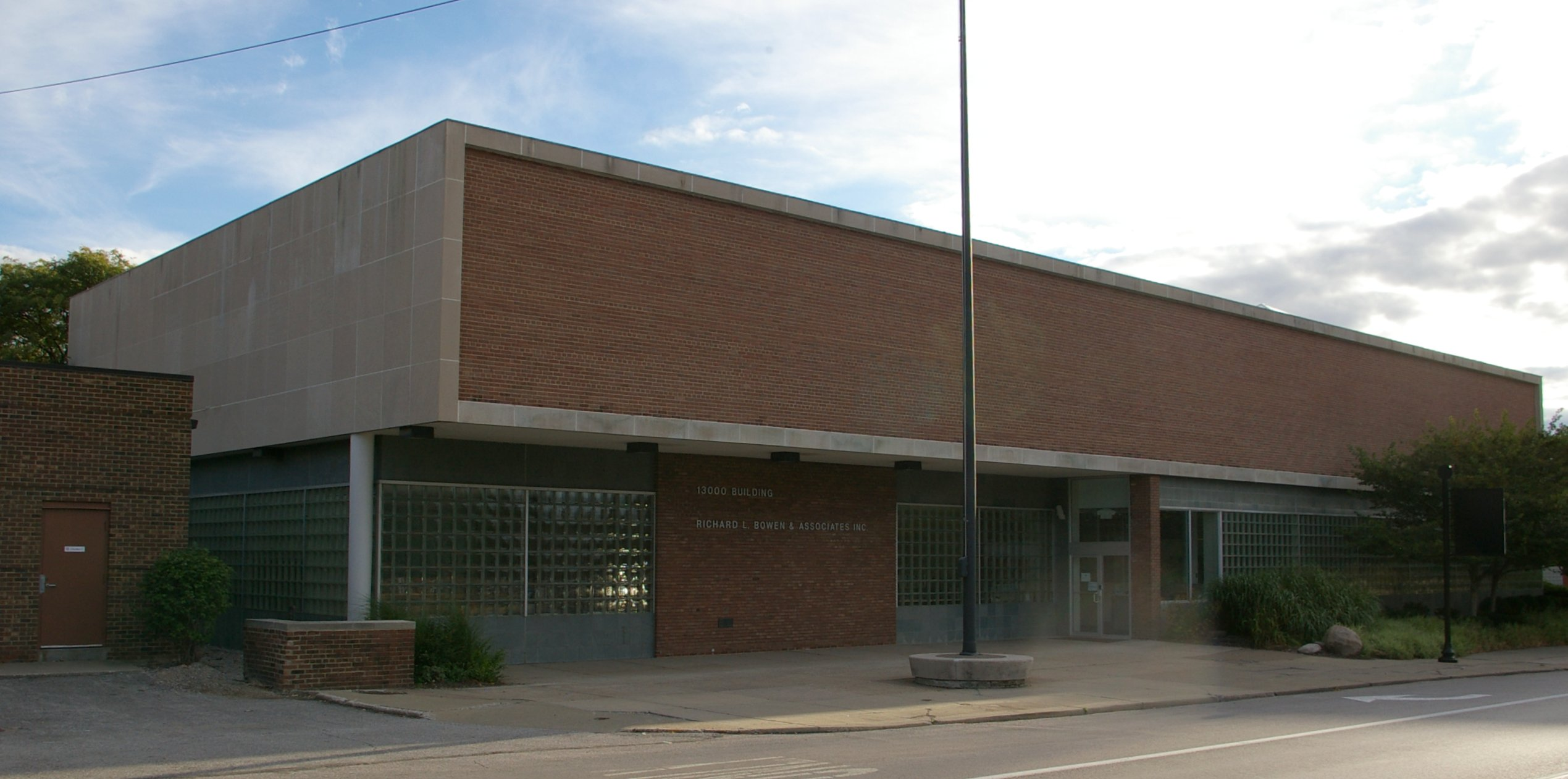

- Location within Ohio Location within the United States
- Location: 13000 Shaker Blvd., Cleveland, Ohio
- Coordinates: 41°29′0″N 81°35′32″W
- Area: less than one acre
- Built: 1948
- Built by: Cleveland Construction Co.
- Architect: Robert A. Little
- Architectural style: International Style
- NRHP reference No.: 05000029
- Added to NRHP: February 9, 2005

Halle Brothers building at Shaker Square is a former department store building constructed in 1948 for the Halle Brothers Co. in the Shaker Square section of Cleveland, Ohio. Designed by architect Robert A. Little, it is listed on the National Register of Historic Places.
