= Anne Ripley Smith =

Co-founder of Alcoholics Anonymous

- Anne Ripley (later Smith), from the 1903 yearbook of Wellesley College
- Born: Anne Robinson Ripley; March 3, 1881; Moline, Illinois, U.S.
- Died: June 1, 1949 (aged 68); Akron, Ohio, U.S.
- Occupations: Writer, co-founder of Alcoholics Anonymous
- Spouse: Robert Holbrook Smith
- Relatives: Edward Payson Ripley (uncle)

Anne Robinson Ripley Smith (March 3, 1881 – June 1, 1949) was a co-founder of Alcoholics Anonymous, along with her husband, Bob Smith, and Bill Wilson.

== Biography ==
Anne Ripley was born in Moline, Illinois, and raised in Oak Park, Illinois, the daughter of Joseph Trescott Ripley and Harriet Theresa Konantz Ripley. Railroad executive Edward Payson Ripley was her uncle. She graduated from Wellesley College in 1903. She married physician Robert Holbrook Smith in 1915, and they had two children. She died in 1949, at age 68.

== Alcoholics Anonymous ==
Anne Smith's influence in Alcoholics Anonymous became widely known through her publication, Anne Smith's Journal, 1933-1939. She compiled and shared with early participants and their families the materials that comprised the early Alcoholics Anonymous's spiritual program—the Bible, Quiet Time, the teachings of Sam Shoemaker, the principles of the Oxford Group, and Christian literature of the day. Smith also became one of the first members of the Al-Anon mutual aid organization when another founder, the wife of Bill W., Lois Wilson, visited her in Akron, Ohio. Al-Anon officially began in 1951, after Anne Smith's death.
