= Sister Ignatia =

Irish-American religious sister

Mary Ignatia Gavin C.S.A.
- Born: January 1, 1889; Shanvally
- Died: April 1, 1966 (aged 77)
- Awards: Ohio Women's Hall of Fame (1991)

Mary Ignatia Gavin, CSA (January 1, 1889 – April 1, 1966), better known as Sister Ignatia, was an Irish-born American Catholic nun and nurse belonging to the Sisters of Charity of St. Augustine. In the course of her work, she became involved in the care of those suffering from alcoholism, working with Bob Smith, who co-founded Alcoholics Anonymous. She became known as the alcoholic's "Angel of Hope".

== Early life ==
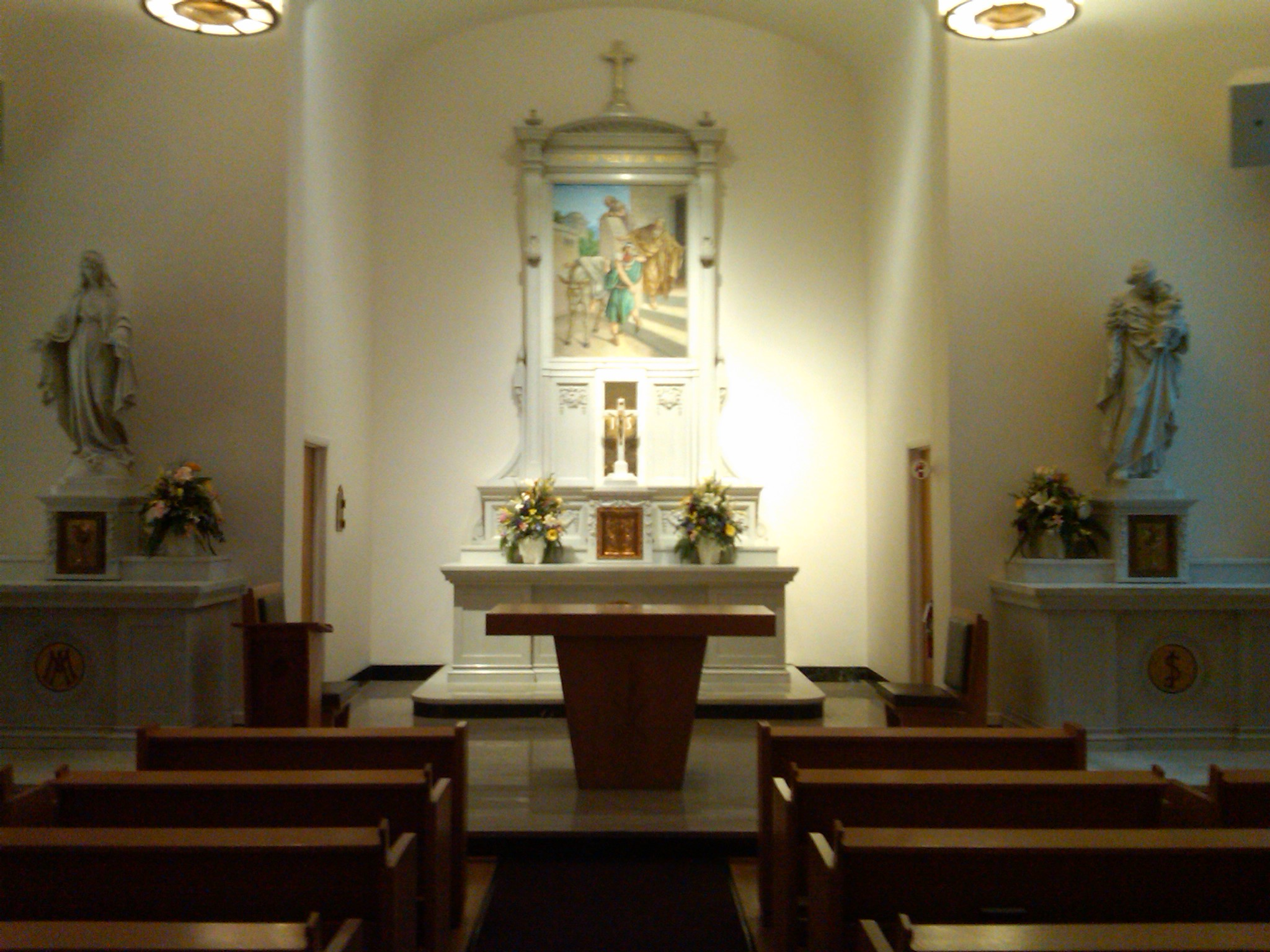
The Christian chapel of St. Thomas Hospital, the institution in which Sister Ignatia worked.

She was born Bridget Della Mary Gavin on 1 January 1889 to Barbara Neary and her husband, who lived on a small parcel of farmland called Gavin's Field in Shanvalley, Burren, County Mayo, Ireland, then part of the United Kingdom of Great Britain and Ireland. Having moved to the United States, in 1914 she entered the Sisters of Charity of St. Augustine in Ohio, at which time she was given the religious name of Sister Mary Ignatia. A skilled musician, she was assigned to teach music. She did this for about ten years, but found it "too hectic" and suffered a nervous breakdown. When she recovered, she was assigned by her religious congregation to work in the admissions office of St. Thomas Hospital in Akron, Ohio.

By the 1930s, Gavin was in charge of admissions at the hospital. Despite its policy of not treating "drunks", she began to do so furtively in 1934. On August 16, 1935, armed with a medical diagnosis of acute gastritis issued by Smith, who was a courtesy staff member of the hospital, she admitted an alcoholic patient to the hospital, making it the first in the world to treat alcoholism as a medical condition. That patient would be the first of millions to participate in the twelve-step program of recovery, the beginning of Alcoholics Anonymous.

Many of the ideas of Alcoholics Anonymous, including the use of tokens to mark milestones in sobriety, were introduced by Gavin. She would give alcoholics leaving St. Thomas Hospital a medallion of the Sacred Heart of Jesus, instructing them that the acceptance of the medallion represented commitment to God, to A.A. and to recovery. She added that if they were going to drink, they should first return the medallion.

Gavin was the first to recognize the use of coffee for alcoholics, insisting that it be freely available in every stage of recovery. When she was transferred to her congregation's St. Vincent Charity Hospital in Cleveland, she refused to compromise on the inclusion of a coffee bar for the ward she was setting up for alcoholics in that institution, Rosary Hall Solarium. This was a name partly inspired by Smith's own initials.

Between 1935 and 1965 Gavin successfully treated thousands of alcoholics. She pioneered the recognition of alcoholism among priests and Religious Sisters. She was remembered for her kindness, honesty and non-judgmental love.

== Honors ==
In 1954, Gavin was awarded the Catherine of Siena Medal by the Theta Phi Alpha fraternity. She was honored for her "outstanding achievement in one of our major problems affecting our country today—alcoholism".

In March 1961, Gavin received a personal letter from President John F. Kennedy, recognizing her service, which she accepted, not for herself, but in the name of her religious congregation and profession.

Gavin was inducted into the Ohio Women's Hall of Fame in 1991.

The March 10, 2008 edition of Modern Healthcare magazine reported that Gavin had been honored as a 2008 inductee into their "Health Care Hall of Fame".

In 2008, a portion of East 22nd Street in Cleveland was renamed "Sr. Ignatia Way" in honor of her service at St. Vincent Charity Hospital (which is located on that very street).

== Later life ==
Gavin continued nursing until May 1965, when she was sent for retirement to the congregation's motherhouse in Richfield, Ohio. She died there eleven months later, on April 1, 1966, at the age of 77. She was buried at the motherhouse cemetery. The crowd at her funeral was estimated at some 3,000 people, which included Bill W., the co-founder of Alcoholics Anonymous.

The alcoholic is deserving of sympathy. Christ-like charity and intelligent care are needed so that with God's grace he or she may be given the opportunity to accept a new philosophy of life.

— Sister Ignatia, C.S.A.

== External sources ==
- Sister Ignatia - Second Edition: Angel of Alcoholics Anonymous, by Mary Darrah
- Dr Bob and the Good Oldtimers, Chapter XIV, AA World Services, Inc., 1980
