= St. Vincent Charity Medical Center =

St. Vincent Charity Health & Healing Hub
- Sisters of Charity Health System
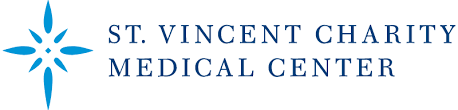

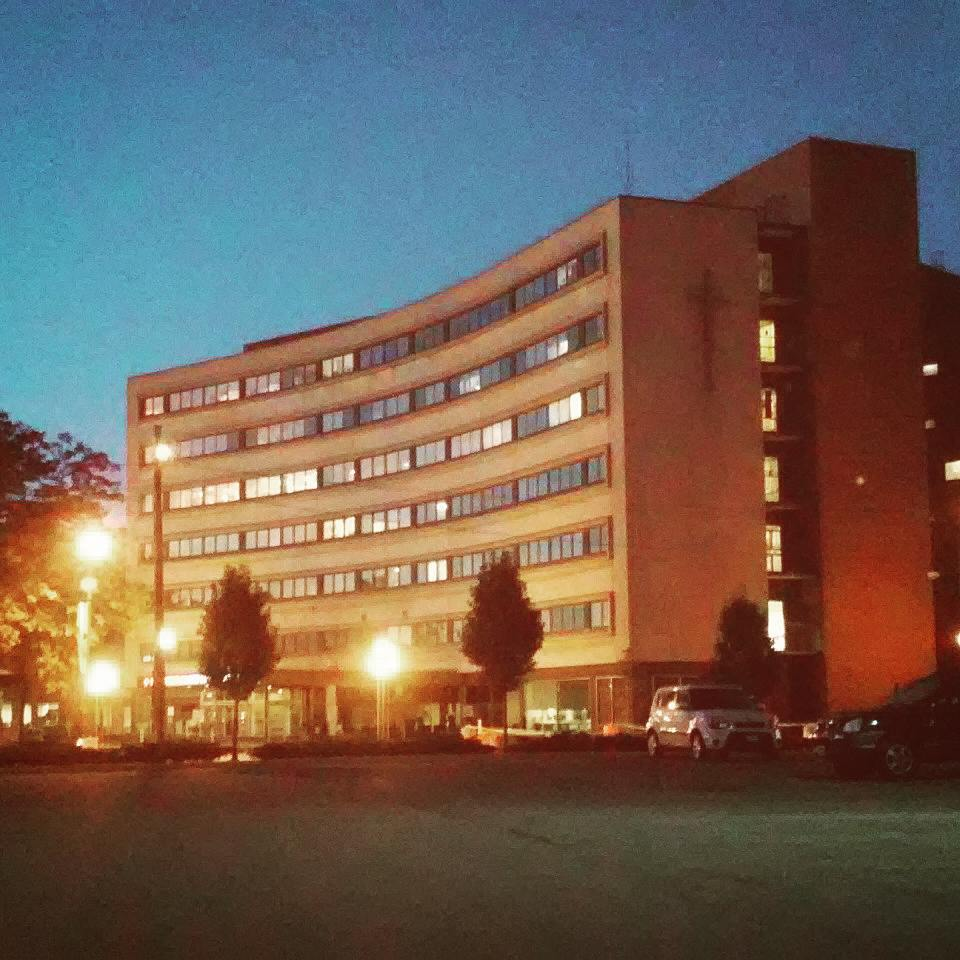

Geography
- Location: Cleveland, Ohio, United States
- Coordinates: 41°29′47″N 81°40′23″W

Organization
- Type: General; Community
- Religious affiliation: Catholic Church
- Affiliated university: Case Western Reserve University School of Medicine
- Network: Sisters of Charity Health System

History
- Founded: 1865

Links
- Website: www.sistersofcharityhealth.org/outreach/st-vincent-charity-health-healing-hub/
- Lists: Hospitals in Ohio

St. Vincent Charity Health & Healing Hub, formerly known as St. Vincent Charity Medical Center, is a medical facility in Cleveland, Ohio with outpatient care. It was founded in 1865 under the auspices of the Roman Catholic Diocese of Cleveland. It has been administered for much of its history by the Sisters of Charity of St. Augustine, a Christian religious order. The medical center previously operated a main hospital in downtown Cleveland, with additional medical offices elsewhere in Cleveland as well as the suburbs of Independence, Rocky River, Solon and Westlake. In 2022, the main hospital closed, though outpatient services currently continue.

== History ==
In 1851, the first Roman Catholic Bishop of Cleveland, Louis Amadeus Rappe, brought from his native France a small group of members of a monastery of Augustinian canonesses regular dedicated to nursing to care for the sick of his diocese. By August of the following year, they were able to open St. Joseph Hospital, the first in the city. When the senior canonesses returned to France the following month, Rappe established the two young women from the group who had chosen to remain as the new religious congregation of Sisters of Charity of St. Augustine, under the leadership of an American woman, Mother Ursula Bissonette. The Sisters continued to operate the hospital until 1856, when they closed it to focus on their work of caring for orphans.

Having no hospital, Cleveland found itself in a poor position to deal with the illness and large numbers of riverboat accidents resulting from its position as a hub to the American West. The outbreak of the American Civil War presented the additional dilemma of treating returning soldiers who had been wounded in battle, needing immediate medical attention and long term nursing care. After discussion between Rappe and Bissonette, along with Gustave E. Weber, a prominent retired Army surgeon, it was felt that the time was opportune to open another hospital. The bishop approached the City Council in May 1863, proposing that the city build a hospital to care for returning veterans, which the Sisters of Charity would staff. After vocal opposition to the proposal by the press, which cited that one-tenth of taxpayers were Roman Catholic, the council rejected the offer.

Rappe then returned with a second proposal that he build the hospital and provide Religious Sisters to staff it, on the condition that the city provide adequate financial support. This proposal was accepted. The bishop then undertook the task of building the hospital. Land was acquired at a cost of $10,000, and the hospital was erected at a cost of $72,000, of which $42,000 came from public funds. St. Vincent Charity Hospital began operations on October 10, 1865.

== Growth ==
Under Weber, who became the hospital's first chief of staff, it soon opened a medical school, Charity Hospital Medical College, which awarded its first medical degree - the first awarded in Cleveland - in 1867. In 1881, the school became a founding member of the Western Reserve Medical Department, which eventually became the Case Western Reserve University School of Medicine. A nursing school was opened to help staff the hospital's work in 1898, and two of the Sisters of Charity became among the first women in Ohio to be certified by the State Board of Pharmacy.

In 1952 a new building was opened for the hospital. This included Rosary Hall Solarium, dedicated to the care of alcoholics, a service pioneered through the work of Sister Ignatia, C.S.A., a co-worker with the founders of Alcoholics Anonymous.

In 2010, the hospital was renamed to St. Vincent Charity Medical Center, after the Sisters of Charity Health System regained full ownership of the hospital. In 2019, Janice Murphy was named president and CEO of the medical center.

In the Fall of 1965, Hollywood director Billy Wilder had scenes filmed in Cleveland for his 1966 film “The Fortune Cookie” starring Jack Lemmon and Walter Matthau. It was the first pairing of the acting duo in a movie. Several exterior scenes of St. Vincent Charity Hospital were filmed by Wilder for the movie, which was renamed “St. Mark Hospital” in the film.

== Present-day healthcare services ==
With seismic shifts in healthcare and the COVID-19 pandemic, a challenging environment arose that would no longer allow the system to offer traditional acute care hospital service. In 2022 St. Vincent downsized to about 100 caregivers, including clinical and non-clinical staff, from 1,442 people employed in 2019; after eliminating all overnight hospital beds, St. Vincent Charity Medical Center continued to provide urgent care, outpatient mental health and addiction services.

The hospital building was demolished in the Summer of 2025 to make way for a new Health Hub concept by the Sisters of Charity Health System to be built in the same general geographic area of downtown Cleveland.
