= Bob Smith (doctor) =

19/20th-century American physician and cofounder of Alcoholics Anonymous

- Born: Robert Holbrook Smith; August 8, 1879; St. Johnsbury, Vermont, U.S.
- Died: November 16, 1950 (aged 71); Akron, Ohio, U.S.
- Education: St. Johnsbury Academy; Dartmouth College (A.B.); University of Michigan Medical School (attended); Rush Medical College (M.D.)
- Occupation: Surgeon
- Known for: co-founder of Alcoholics Anonymous
- Spouse: Anne Ripley (m. 1915; died 1949)

Robert Holbrook Smith (August 8, 1879 – November 16, 1950), also known as Dr. Bob, was an American physician and surgeon who cofounded Alcoholics Anonymous with Bill Wilson (more commonly known as Bill W.).

== Family and early life ==
Smith was born and raised in St. Johnsbury, Vermont to Susan A. (Holbrook) and Walter Perrin Smith. His parents took him to religious services four times a week, and in response he determined he would never attend religious services when he grew up. He graduated from St Johnsbury Academy in 1898, having met his future wife Anne Robinson Ripley at a dance there.

== Education, marriage, work, and alcoholism ==
Smith began drinking while attending Dartmouth College in Hanover, New Hampshire. Early on, he noticed that he could recover from drinking bouts quicker and easier than his classmates and that he never had headaches, which caused him to believe he was an alcoholic from the time he began drinking. Smith was a member of Kappa Pi Kappa fraternity at Dartmouth. After graduation in 1902, he worked for three years selling hardware in Boston, Chicago, and Montreal and continued drinking heavily. He then returned to school to study medicine at the University of Michigan. By this time drinking had begun to affect him to the point where he began missing classes. His drinking caused him to leave school, but he returned and passed his examinations for his sophomore year. He transferred to Rush Medical College, but his alcoholism worsened to the point that his father was summoned to try to halt his downward trajectory. But his drinking increased and after a dismal showing during final examinations, the university required that he remain for two extra quarters and remain sober during that time as a condition of graduating.

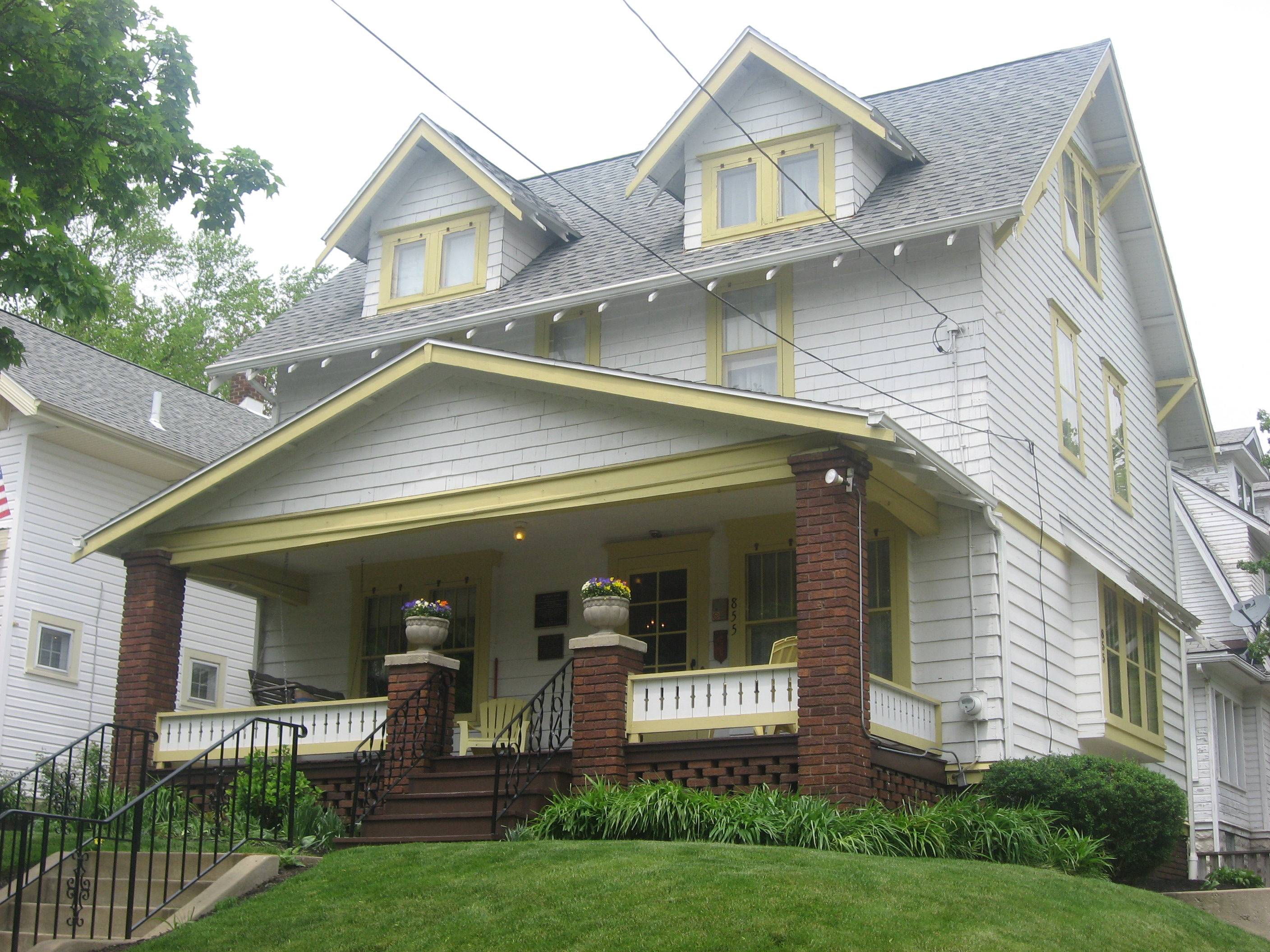
Smith's house in Akron

After graduation, Smith became a hospital intern, and for two years he was able to stay busy enough to refrain from heavy drinking. He married Anne Robinson Ripley on January 25, 1915, and opened up his own office in Akron, Ohio, specializing in colorectal surgery and returned to heavy drinking. Recognizing his problem, he checked himself into more than a dozen hospitals and sanitariums in an effort to stop his drinking. He was encouraged by the passage of Prohibition in 1919, but soon discovered that the exemption for medicinal alcohol, and bootleggers, could supply more than enough to continue his excessive drinking. For the next 17 years his life revolved around how to subvert his wife's efforts to stop his drinking and obtain the alcohol he craved while trying to hold together a medical practice in order to support his family and his drinking.

== Meeting Bill Wilson ==
In January 1933, Bob Smith attended a lecture by Frank Buchman, the founder of the Oxford Group. For the next two years Smith attended local meetings of the group in an effort to solve his alcoholism, but recovery eluded him until he met Bill Wilson on May 12, 1935. Wilson was an alcoholic who had learned how to stay sober, thus far only for some limited amounts of time, through the Oxford Group in New York, and was close to discovering long-term sobriety by helping other alcoholics. Wilson was in Akron on business that had proven unsuccessful and he was in fear of relapsing. Recognizing the danger, he made inquiries about any local alcoholics he could talk to and was referred to Smith by Henrietta Seiberling, one of the leaders of the Akron Oxford Group. After talking to Wilson, Smith stopped drinking and invited Wilson to stay at his home. He relapsed almost a month later while attending a professional convention in Atlantic City. Returning to Akron on June 9, he was given a few drinks by Wilson to avoid delirium tremens. He drank one beer the next morning to settle his nerves so he could perform an operation, which proved to be the last alcoholic drink he would ever have. The date, June 10, 1935, is celebrated as the founding of Alcoholics Anonymous.

== Final years ==
Smith was called the "Prince of Twelfth Steppers" by Wilson because he helped more than 5,000 alcoholics before his death. He was able to stay sober from June 10, 1935, until his death in 1950 from colon cancer. He is buried at the Mount Peace Cemetery in Akron, Ohio.

== See also ==
- History of Alcoholics Anonymous
- Bill W. and Dr. Bob
- St. Thomas Hospital (Akron, Ohio)
- Sister Ignatia
