= Ilene Shapiro =

American businessperson and politician

Executive of Summit County, Ohio
- Incumbent
- Assumed office August 1, 2016
- Preceded by: Russ M. Pry
- Constituency: Summit County, Ohio

Personal details
- Born: 1947 (age 78–79)
- Party: Democratic
- Occupation: Politician; entrepreneur; businesswoman
- Website: https://co.summitoh.net/

Ilene Shapiro (born 1947) is an American businessperson and politician. She has served as the Executive of Summit County, Ohio, since August 1, 2016. Her predecessor Russell M. Pry died in office on July 31, 2016. She was elected in 2016 and re-elected in 2020 and 2024. Shapiro is currently serving a four-year term that ends December 31, 2028. Previously, Shapiro was a member of Summit County Council for ten years and Council President for three years. Prior to her time in public service, Shapiro was a businesswoman. She is Jewish.

== Business career ==
Before her time on County Council, Shapiro was a businesswoman and a small business owner. She was an executive at First Merit Bank and the Summa Health Foundation. She later became an entrepreneur, and created a beauty supply company and consultancy firm based in Akron. Shapiro was the head of Shapiro Consulting, a business consulting firm.

Prior to her time as County Executive Shapiro received the "Women in Business Advocate" from the U.S. Small Business Administration. Shapiro was a founder of the Women's Endowment Fund of the Akron Community Foundation.

== Summit County Council ==
=== Council Member at-Large ===
Shapiro was elected to Summit County Council in 2006 as an at-large councilmember. She served as the chair of the planning and economic development committee for her seven years. In 2007, she was recognized with a Women of Professional Excellence Award Women's Network Inc. In 2008, Shapiro received the Northeast Ohio Athena Award from ATHENA International. In 2011, the Akron Urban League named Shapiro a Pioneer at their annual Pioneer and Protege's recognition event.

=== Council President ===
Shapiro was elected council president in 2014. In 2015, Shapiro received the Harold Stubbs Award for Government.

== County Executive ==
=== Interim County Executive ===
When Executive Russ Pry died in 2016, she was named Interim County Executive on August 1, 2016 due to her position as President of County Council. The Summit County Democratic Party then voted and selected her to complete the remainder of Pry's term and to replace him on the ballot in November 2016. During her first few weeks as County Executive, Shapiro sought to continue the initiatives started by the late Russ Pry.

==== 2016 Election ====
In 2016, most Democrats in Summit County won their elections against their Republican rivals. Shapiro faced Bill Roemer (R) in the general election. Shapiro won 58.94% of the vote compared to Roemer's 41.06%. Her term ended December 31, 2020.

Shapiro ran a campaign focused on economic development, workforce training, and diversity inclusion. Her campaign planned to continue and expand upon the work of Russ Pry.

=== Tenure ===
Shapiro made economic development and workforce training a priority of her first term in office. The county is attempting to attract businesses-small and large- to the region. In March 2019, the county launched its new Economic Development Tool, Summit4Success. A website aimed at increasing business relocation to Summit County. This website also allows for individuals to connect with economic development employees of the county. Executive Shapiro announced the creation of Summit Liberty House, a shelter for veteran women in Summit county, at the 2018 State of the County. The project was completed in September 2019.

Shapiro's tenure included a focus on diversity, equity, and inclusion efforts. In the first year after her election, Shapiro created an Advisory Council on Diversity and Inclusion to review the County's initiatives and practices relating to employment, purchasing, representation, and community engagement. In 2019, Shapiro announced that the County would seek to become an AARP Age-Friendly Community, and in 2023 began offering the Age-Friendly Seal of Approval program to certify businesses and institutions in the county as age-friendly. In 2020, Shapiro supported a County Council resolution, sponsored by Councilwoman Veronica Sims, declaring racism as a public health crisis and creating of a special review committee to review county practices.

Shapiro was named a Women of Note 2019 by Crain's Cleveland Business. In 2022, she received the Greater Akron Chamber's H. Peter Burg Award and the Victim Assistance Program Bernard Rosen Community Service Award.

==== Opioid crisis ====
In October 2017, Executive Shapiro announced plans to sue the companies that make and distribute addictive painkillers. She declared a state of emergency in the county and said the opioid epidemic has cost taxpayers $112 million from 2012 to 2017. In 2019, Summit County and Cuyahoga County reached a settlement with several large pharmaceutical companies for $260 million; Summit County received $104 million in total. Executive Shapiro then directed the creation of the Opiate Abatement Advisory Council (OAAC) to oversee the immediate and future distribution of the funds. Summit County and the OAAC have since awarded numerous grants, including $5.3 million for a data sharing platform championed by Shapiro, Unite Us, $1.4 million for care coordination for residents leaving the Summit County Jail, $1.5 million to Cleveland Clinic Akron General's Recovery's in Reach Program, and $1.5 million to Summa Health's First Step Program.

The OAAC has also awarded $1.25 million to the Akron Community Foundation's Opioid Healing Fund to provide small grants to organizations working to combat the opioid epidemic in Summit County.

In addition to the lawsuit responding to the crisis, Executive Shapiro facilitated the gifting of land that was once the Edwin Shaw rehab hospital to two nonprofits that aim to combat the opioid crisis, Restore Addiction Recovery and Hope United.

==== COVID-19 pandemic ====
Shapiro declared a state of emergency on March 13, 2020 after Summit County Public Health reported the County's first confirmed coronavirus case and immediately requested additional funding for the Foodbank from Summit County Council. As County Executive, she oversaw the spending of $94 million in CARES Act funding and $104 million in American Rescue Plan Act of 2021 funding. Shapiro directed the allocation of money to local small business grants, arts organizations and nonprofit grants, reopening and technology funds to the county's public school districts, funding for first responders, funding for the Foodbank, and emergency assistance for rent, mortgage, and utilities. The County also used funding to make technological upgrades, including a virtual courtroom platform and investment in broadband infrastructure.

== Electoral history ==
=== Summit County Council ===
The three At-Large candidates with the most votes are elected, as indicated by asterisks (*).

2006 General Election, County Council At-Large
Party	Candidate	Votes	Pct
Democrat	Ilene Shapiro*	93,667	19.96
Democrat	Pete Crossland*	91,111	19.42
Democrat	Jon Poda*	90,195	19.22
Republican	Michael T. Callahan	71,078	15.15
Republican	Lynn C. Slaby	70,179	14.95
Republican	David P. Drew	53,046	11.30

2010 General Election, County Council At-Large
Party	Candidate	Votes	Pct
Democrat	Ilene Shapiro*	75,913	18.28
Republican	Bill Roemer*	69,592	16.76
Democrat	Jon Poda*	68,814	16.57
Democrat	Pete Crossland	68,162	16.41
Republican	Gloria J. Rodgers	67,169	16.18
Republican	Amy Schwan	65,614	15.80

2014 General Election, County Council At-Large
Party	Candidate	Votes	Pct
Democrat	John A. Donofrio*	67,046	19.43
Democrat	Ilene Shapiro*	59,512	17.24
Democrat	Sandra Kurt*	58,184	16.86
Republican	Bill Roemer	57,517	16.67
Republican	Debbie Walsh	54,493	15.79
Republican	Gary Hagen	48,359	14.01

=== Summit County Executive ===
Year	Democrat	Votes	Pct	Republican	Votes	Pct
2016	Ilene Shapiro	138,466	58.94	Bill Roemer	96,455	41.06
2020	Ilene Shapiro	153,173	58.04	John E. Chapman	110,746	41.96

Political offices
Preceded by Russell M. Pry	Executive of Summit County, Ohio; 2016–present	Incumbent
