= Cleveland Clinic Children's =

- Cleveland Clinic

Geography
- Location: 9500 Euclid Ave, Cleveland, Ohio, United States
- Coordinates: 41.501881°N 81.622656°W

Organization
- Type: Children's hospital
- Affiliated university: Cleveland Clinic Lerner College of Medicine; Case Western Reserve University School of Medicine; Heritage College of Osteopathic Medicine; Kent State University College of Podiatric Medicine

Services
- Emergency department: Pediatric Emergency
- Beds: 389

Helipads
- Helipad: FAA LID: 6OI8 (Shared with Cleveland Clinic)

Links
- Website: Children's Website
- Lists: Hospitals in Ohio

Cleveland Clinic Children's (CCC) is a pediatric acute care children's teaching hospital located in Cleveland, Ohio, on the main campus of Cleveland Clinic. The hospital has 389 pediatric beds and is affiliated with Cleveland Clinic Lerner College of Medicine, the Case Western Reserve University School of Medicine, Heritage College of Osteopathic Medicine and Kent State University College of Podiatric Medicine. The hospital provides comprehensive pediatric specialties and subspecialties to infants, children, teens, and young adults aged 0–21 throughout Cleveland and the wider northern Ohio region. Cleveland Clinic Children's also sometimes treats adults that require pediatric care. The hospital is a few blocks away from the Ronald McDonald House of Cleveland.

== History ==
In 2014 Cleveland Clinic Children's entered into a collaboration with Akron Children's Hospital to open up a pediatric and adult congenital heart program.

In 2017 administrators from Cleveland Clinic announced the construction of a new $20 million, 120,000-square-foot, pediatric outpatient center. While the new facility will join children's primary and specialty outpatient care in one location, inpatients would still be housed at the M Building. The new building was constructed by firm Turner Construction, designed by HKS and consists of 50 exam rooms, 20 pediatric infusion rooms, and four operating rooms. The building opened to patients in 2018 and is now known as the R Building.

In 2019 it was announced that Akron Children's Hospital and the Cleveland Clinic would be expanding the pediatric and adult congenital heart program that was started 2014. The expansion consisted of two new centers, located at Akron Children's and Cleveland Clinic Children's Hospital. In addition, five-more-years was added to the agreement.

== About ==
The hospital has an American Academy of Pediatrics verified level III neonatal intensive care unit that has a capacity of 17 bassinets. The hospital also has 38 bed pediatric intensive care beds for critical pediatric patients age 0-21.

The hospital does not have a level I pediatric trauma center and transports all pediatric trauma patients to the nearby Rainbow Babies & Children's Hospital.

The hospital is a few blocks away from the Ronald McDonald House of Cleveland, while also having a family room on the third floor of the M Building.

=== Awards ===
In 2018 the hospital ranked nationally as #23 in pediatric cancer, #26 in pediatric cardiology and heart surgery, #39 in pediatric diabetes and endocrinology, #23 in pediatric gastroenterology and gi surgery, #50 in neonatology, #49 in pediatric nephrology, #24 in pediatric neurology and neurosurgery, #50 in pediatric orthopedics, #32 in pediatric pulmonology, and #42 in pediatric urology on the 2018-19 U.S. News & World Report.

As of 2021 Cleveland Clinic Children's has placed nationally all 10 ranked pediatric specialties on U.S. News & World Report. In addition, the hospital has ranked as the third best children's hospital in Ohio (behind Cincinnati Children's Hospital Medical Center and Nationwide Children's Hospital).

2021 U.S. News & World Report Rankings for Cleveland Clinic Children's Hospital
| Specialty | Rank (In the U.S.) | Score (Out of 100) |
|---|---|---|
| Neonatology | #14 | 85.8 |
| Pediatric Cancer | #17 | 80.0 |
| Pediatric Cardiology and Heart Surgery | #15 | 81.4 |
| Pediatric Diabetes & Endocrinology | #44 | 65.9 |
| Pediatric Gastroenterology & GI Surgery | #12 | 86.1 |
| Pediatric Nephrology | #35 | 69.2 |
| Pediatric Neurology & Neurosurgery | #25 | 79.7 |
| Pediatric Orthopedics | #26 | 73.2 |
| Pediatric Pulmonology & Lung Surgery | #32 | 73.6 |
| Pediatric Urology | #23 | 67.5 |

== Facilities ==
=== Rehabilitation hospital ===
Named the "Cleveland Clinic Children's Hospital for Rehabilitation," the hospital was originally founded 1889, and features 52-beds for pediatric rehabilitation. The hospital provides comprehensive pediatric rehabilitative services for children with disabilities caused by trauma, birth defects, brain and spinal-cord injury, respiratory, orthopedic and developmental disorders.

=== Main hospital ===
Cleveland Clinic Children's Hospital is considered as a "hospital within a hospital" as their main inpatient hospital is located within the M Building of the Cleveland Clinic campus.

=== Fairview campus ===
Cleveland Clinic Children's includes a 24-bed pediatric inpatient unit at Cleveland Clinic Fairview Hospital. In 2019, the hospital announced that they would open a new child and adolescent psychiatry unit made up of 13 private rooms. The hospital also announced the opening of the new 16-bed pediatric emergency department to reduce the stress for children who are treated at the hospital.

== See also ==
- List of children's hospitals in the United States
- Cleveland Clinic
- Case Western Reserve University School of Medicine
- Rainbow Babies & Children's Hospital
