= Summa Health =

American non-profit organization

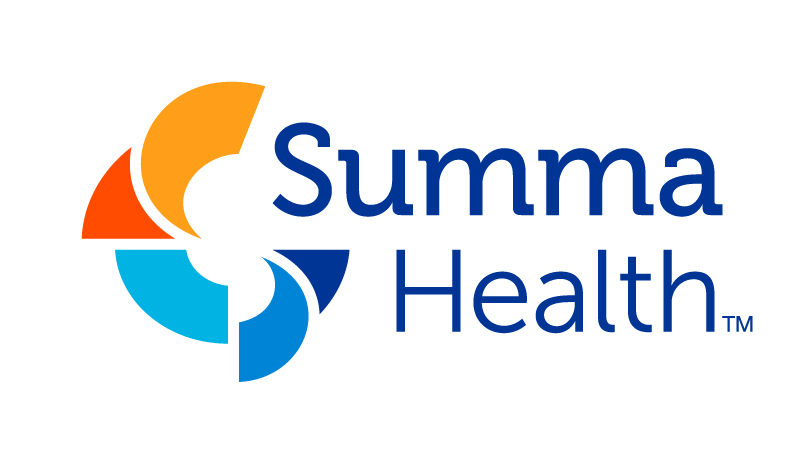

Summa Health is a for-profit integrated healthcare delivery system in Northeast Ohio, United States. The Greater Akron Chamber (Ohio) documents Summa Health as the largest employer in Summit County with more than 7,000 employees. Summa provides comprehensive emergency, acute, critical, outpatient and long-term/home care.

Summa Health's integrated healthcare system, encompasses a network of hospitals, multiple community-based health centers, a health plan (Summa Care), a multi-specialty group practice, an accountable care organization (ACO - New Health Collaborative), research and medical education and a foundation.

Outpatient care is offered throughout Summit, Stark, Wayne, Portage, and Medina counties in several community health centers. The healthcare system provides patient care, medical research, and continuing medical education, and is ranked a top healthcare provider in the region.

In 2023, Summa Health earned $1.86 billion in revenue. This include $1.3 billion from Summa Health hospitals, $5,000,000 from SummaCare, and $244 million from Summa Health Medical Group. Summa Health has 28.62% market share of primary care in the Akron metropolitan area.

== History ==
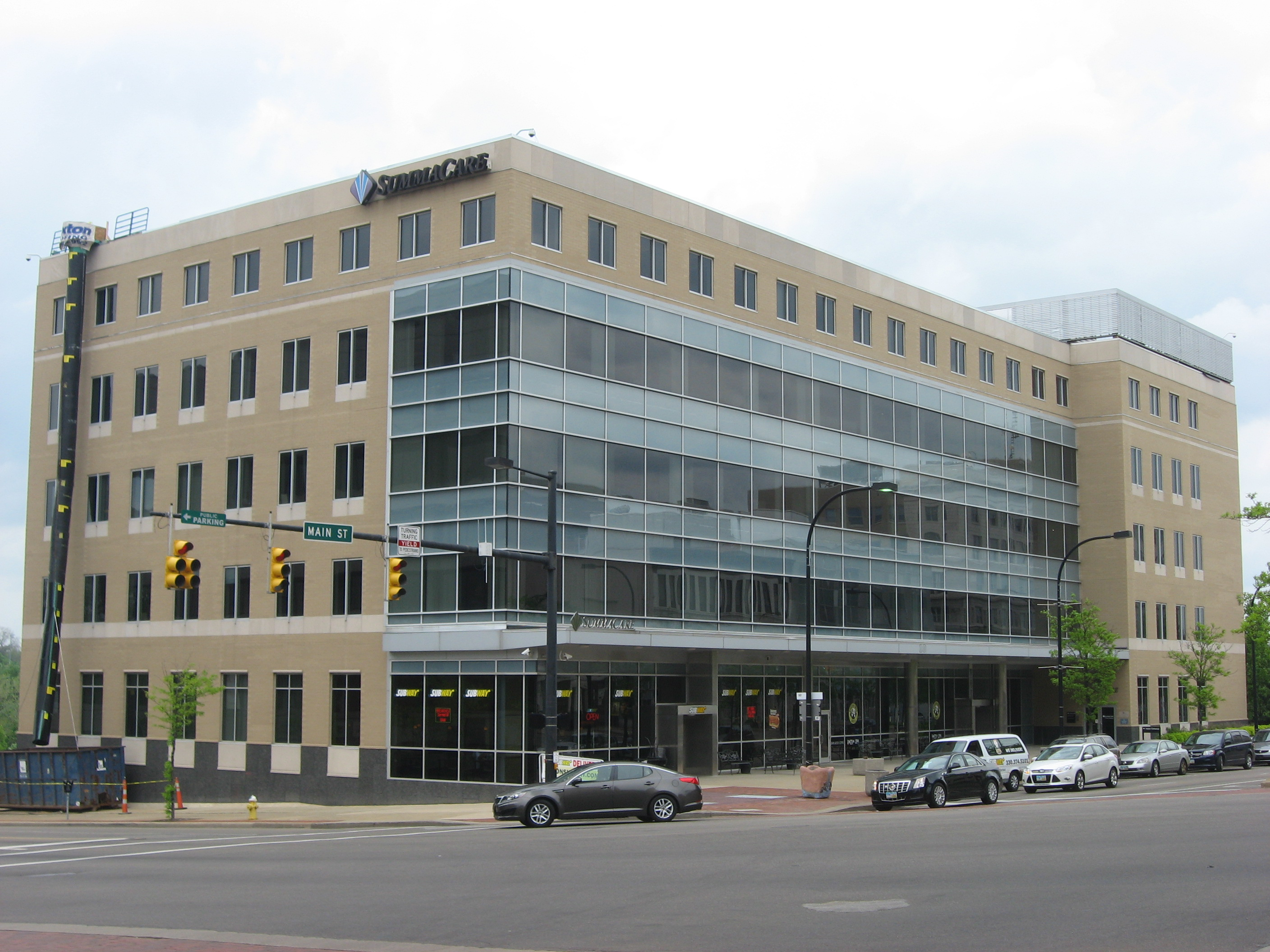
Former headquarters on Market Street in downtown Akron, on the site of the former Portage Hotel, now the Akron Public Schools Sylvester Small Administration Building

Summa Health System was formed in 1989 when Akron City Hospital and St. Thomas Hospital merged. Summa Health now encompasses a network of hospitals, community-based health centers, a health plan, a physician-hospital organization, an entrepreneurial entity, research, and medical education and a foundation.

More than 1,300 licensed, inpatient beds are represented on the Summa Health Akron Campus, Summa Health Rehab Hospital, and Summa Health Barberton Campus.

In January 2024, Venture Capital firm General Catalyst announced it has agreed to purchase Summa Health and reestablish it as a for-profit corporation. The sale to General Catalyst was announced at a price of $485 million. The sale was completed in 2025. The attorney general of Ohio, Dave Yost, increased the final purchase price from $485 million to $515 million to reflect the fair market value.

== Services ==
Summa Health System specializes in advanced bariatric care, behavioral health, cancer care, cardiovascular, neurosciences, orthopedics, primary care, senior health, sports health, surgical services, urology and women's health.

The Jean B. and Milton N. Cooper Pavilion on the Summa Akron Campus provides outpatient cancer services. The 60,000-square-foot facility includes physician and support staff offices; a conference center; and cancer-related services, including 28 infusion treatment areas, three radiation oncology treatment areas, diagnostic imaging, clinical research, rehabilitation services and educational and support services; and access to psychologists and physical therapists.

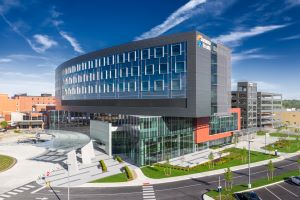

== Locations and Facilities ==
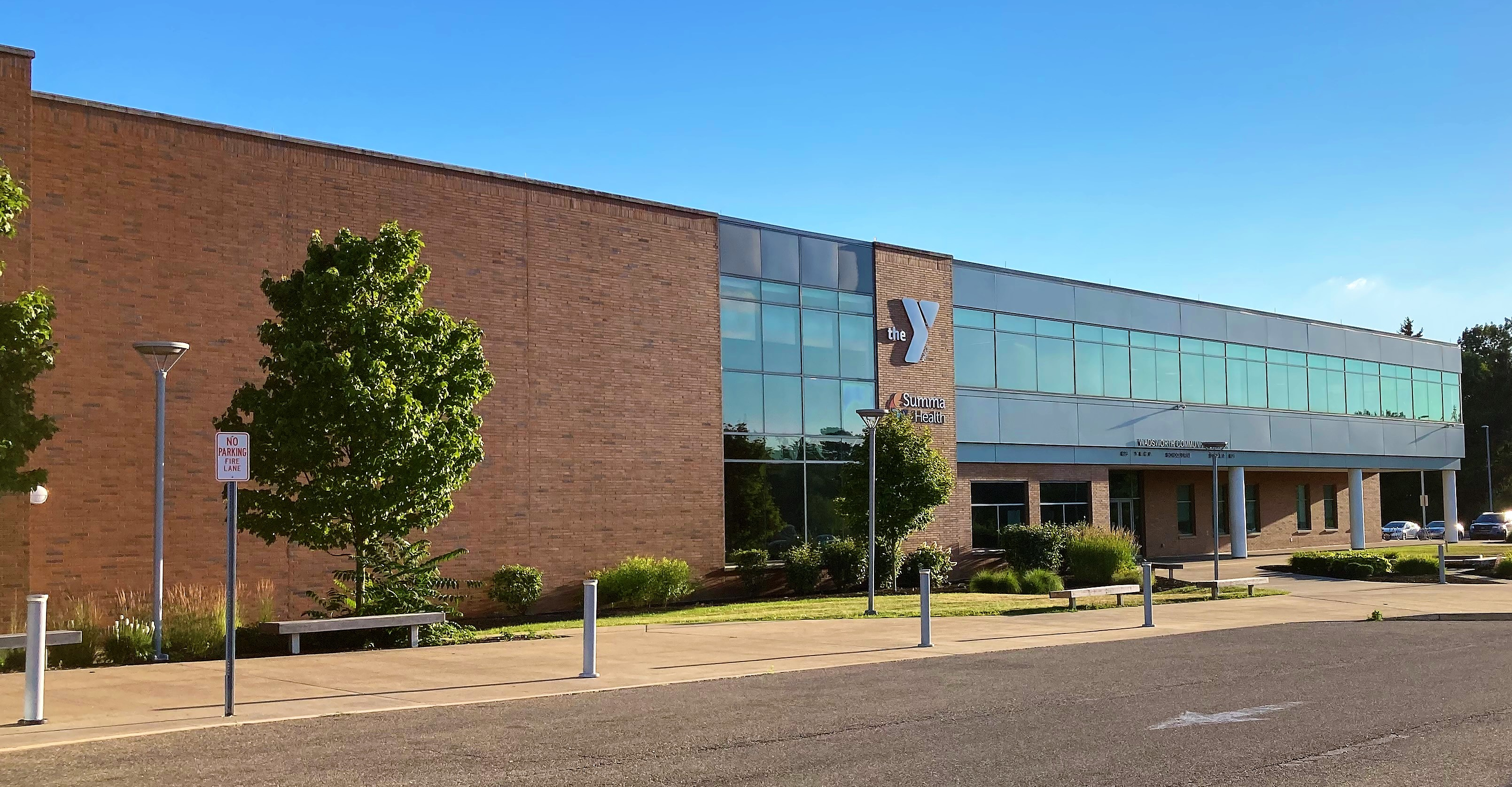
Summa Health at Wadsworth Community Center

Summa Health System represents more than 1,300 licensed beds in the following clinical settings:

- Summa Akron Campus
- Summa Barberton Campus
- Summa Health Wadsworth-Rittman Medical Center
- Summa Health Medina Medical Center
- Summa Health Green Medical Center
- Summa Health Tallmadge Medical Center
- Summa Health Chapel Hill Medical Center
- Summa Health Equity Center at Four Seasons
- Summa Health Cuyahoga Falls Medical Center
- Summa Health Hudson Medical Center
- Summa Health Spine and Neuroscience Center
- Summa Health Stow-Kent Medical Center
- Summa Health White Pond Medical Center
- Summa Health Wellness Center
- Summa Health at Wadsworth Community Center
- Summa Rehab Hospital
- Summa Health Fairlawn Urgent Care
- Summa Health Green Urgent Care
- Summa Health Tallmadge Urgent Care

Outpatient care is provided to the Ohio counties of Summit, Portage, Medina, Stark and Wayne.
