= Magnet Recognition Program =

Nurse recognition program

The Magnet Recognition Program is a recognition program operated by the American Nurses Credentialing Center that allows nurses to recognize nursing excellence in other nurses. It is considered the highest recognition for nursing excellence. The program also offers an avenue to disseminate successful nursing practices and strategies. ANCC proclaims that "A growing body of research indicates that Magnet hospitals have higher percentages of satisfied RNs, lower RN turnover and vacancy, improved clinical outcomes and improved patient satisfaction."

== History ==
In December 1990, the American Nurses Association Board of Directors approved the creation of the Magnet Hospital Recognition Program for Excellence in Nursing Services. The program was based on an earlier study by the American Academy of Nursing which identified 14 characteristics of healthcare organizations that excelled in recruitment and retention of registered nurses.

Following a pilot program involving five hospitals, in 1994, ANCC awarded the first Magnet recognition to the University of Washington Medical Center in Seattle, WA.

In 1997, ANCC changed the official name of the program to the Magnet Nursing Services Recognition Program.

The following year, the program was expanded by ANCC to include recognition of long term care facilities.

By 2000, ANCC had received numerous requests to expand the program outside of the US. The ANCC Board then expanded the program to recognize healthcare organizations abroad.

In 2002, ANCC once again changed the official name of the program to its current name, Magnet Recognition Program.

== Conceptual model ==
The program is based on the 14 characteristics of "Magnet" facilities originally described in the 1983 AAN study. These characteristics are known as the Forces of Magnetism. These Forces are grouped into 5 Components that represent the framework that distinguishes Magnet organizations.

=== Transformational Leadership ===
This component includes the Forces of Quality of Nursing Leadership and Management Style.

=== Structural Empowerment ===
This component includes the Forces of Organizational Structure, Personnel Policies and Programs, Community and the Healthcare Organization, Image of Nursing, and Professional Development.

=== Exemplary Professional Practice ===
This component includes the Forces of Professional Models of Care, Consultation and Resources, Autonomy, Nurses as Teachers, and Interdisciplinary Relationships.

=== New Knowledge, Innovation, & Improvements ===
This component includes the Force of Quality Improvement.

=== Empirical Quality Results ===
This component includes the Force of Quality of Care.
