= Summa Health Akron Campus =

- Summa Health
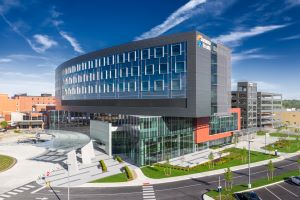

Geography
- Location: Akron, Ohio, United States
- Coordinates: 41°04′48″N 81°30′02″W

Organization
- Care system: Private
- Type: Teaching
- Affiliated university: Northeast Ohio Medical University (NEOMED)

Services
- Emergency department: Level I trauma
- Beds: 750

Helipads
- Helipad: FAA LID: 28OI

History
- Former names: Akron City Hospital; The City Hospital

Links
- Website: www.summahealth.org/locations/hospitals/akron
- Lists: Hospitals in Ohio

Summa Health Akron Campus, formerly known as Akron City Hospital, part of Summa Health System, was founded in 1892 in Akron, Ohio, United States as The City Hospital. From the first accredited radiology department in the country to the first adult open heart surgery in Akron. Summa Health Akron Campus has achieved national recognition as a healthcare provider.

Summa Health Akron Campus is a Level I trauma center with 100 emergency/trauma patient care spaces, and is a nationally ranked 750-bed for-profit, teaching hospital located in Akron, Ohio. Summa Health Akron Campus is also a Certified Chest Pain Center and a Comprehensive Stroke Center, and its obstetrics care is nationally recognized for quality. In 2010, Summa Akron City and St. Thomas Hospitals were awarded Magnet recognition by American Nurses Credentialing Center. Only six percent of hospitals in the United States are recognized as Magnet hospitals.

== Major milestones ==
1973

- Becomes teaching hospital in consortium with what was then known as the Northeast Ohio Universities College of Medicine (NEOUCOM), (now known as the Northeast Ohio Medical University (NEOMED).

2008

- Jean and Milton Cooper Cancer Center opens on the Summa Health–Akron Campus.

2019

- The Summa Health–Akron Campus West Tower opens. It includes the new main entrance to the hospital, operating rooms, a 22-bed neonatal intensive care unit, labor and delivery rooms, prep and recovery rooms, a newborn observation room, women's health services, breast center and 108 private inpatient rooms.

2023

- The St. Thomas Campus closed and the Summa Health Behavioral Health Institute moved into the new 60 bed Juve Behavioral Health Pavilion on the Summa Health–Akron Campus. The outpatient Summa Health Wound Care & Hyperbaric Medicine Center also moved to the Summa Health–Akron Campus.

2025

- The former St. Thomas Campus is demolished.

== Recognition and honors ==
- Designated a Magnet Hospital.

== Services ==
Summa Health Akron Campus is known for advancements in geriatric medicine, hospice and palliative care, women's health, bariatrics, oncology, orthopaedics and cardiology.

Its services also include: cardiothoracic surgery; critical care; diagnostic imaging; digestive diseases; gastroenterology; medical and surgical services; neonatal intensive care; neurology; obstetrics and gynecology; pain management; pediatric intensive care; pulmonary care; radiology; rehabilitation services; sleep disorders; occupational, physical, recreational and speech therapy; urology and vascular.

== Notable people born in this hospital ==
- Stephen Curry (b. March 14, 1988), professional basketball player
- LeBron James (b. December 30, 1984), professional basketball player
- Neel Kashkari (b. July 30, 1973), banker and politician
