= Economy of Columbus, Ohio =

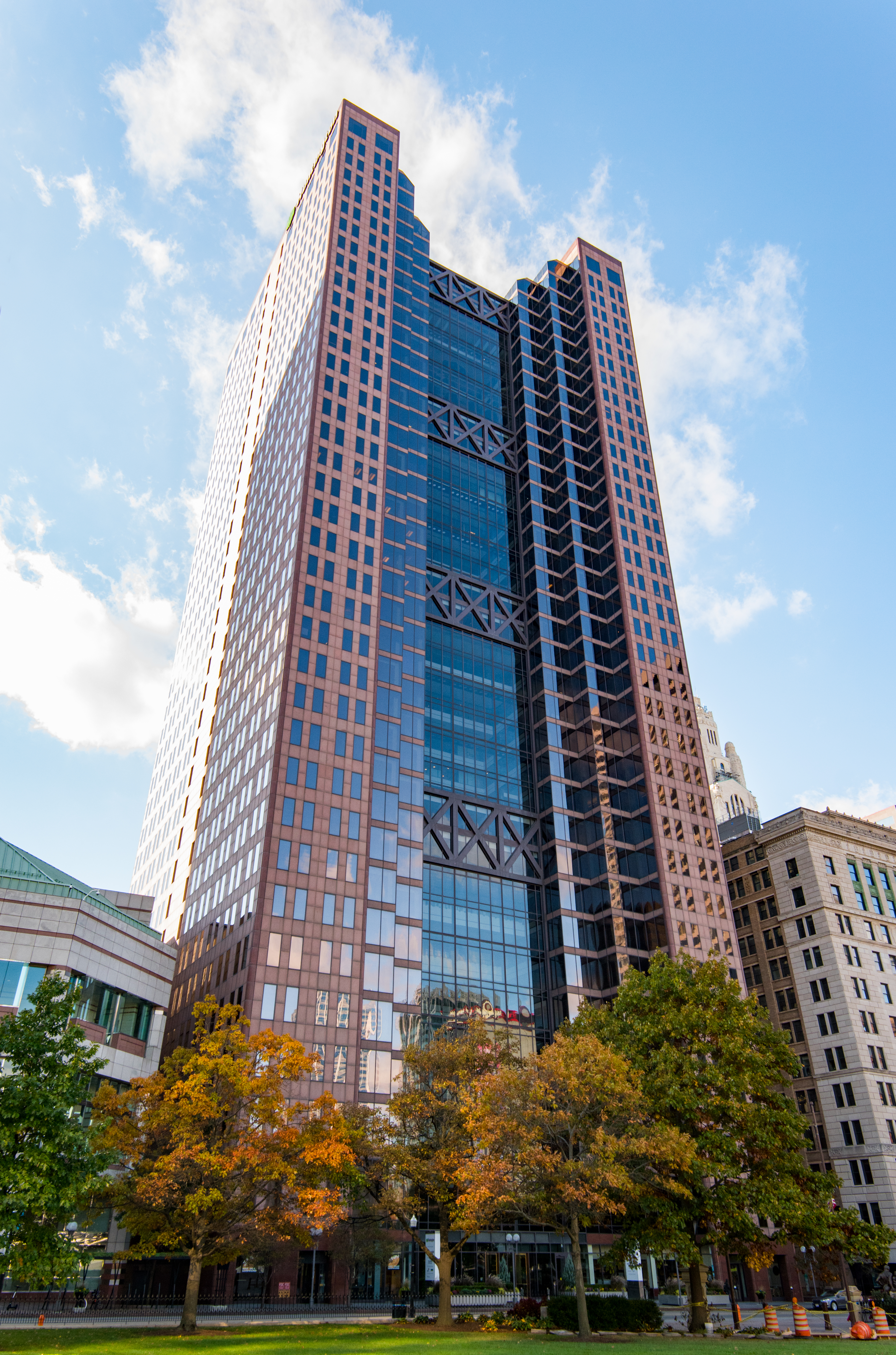
Huntington Center in downtown Columbus

Columbus, Ohio has an economy based on education, insurance, banking, fashion, defense, aviation, food, logistics, steel, energy, medical research, health care, hospitality, retail, and technology.

Prominent employers in the Columbus area include numerous schools (e.g., The Ohio State University) and hospitals, hi-tech research and development and information/library companies such as Battelle Memorial Institute, OCLC, and Chemical Abstracts, and retail clothing and restaurant companies (such as Limited Brands and Wendy's). Other large employers include Bread Financial, Nationwide Insurance, JP Morgan Chase, American Electric Power, Huntington Bancshares, Worthington Industries and Cardinal Health, not to mention both state and local government.

== History ==
In 1953, GBQ Partners, a professional services firm was founded, and is the largest Columbus-owned accounting firm. During the recession beginning in late 2007, Columbus's economy was not impacted as much as the rest of the country, due to decades of diversification work by long-time corporate residents, business leaders, and political leaders. The former administration of mayor Michael B. Coleman had continued this work, although the city faced financial turmoil and had to increase taxes, due in part to alleged fiscal mismanagement. As Columbus is the state capital, there is a large government presence in the city. Including city, county, state, and federal employers, government jobs provide the largest single source of employment within Columbus.

In 2010, Overall, it was ranked as one of the top 10 best big cities in the country according to Relocate America, a real estate research firm. In 2023, Realtor named it as the third-hottest housing market in the United States.

In 2016, Forbes ranked Columbus the No. 7 best city for young professionals. In 2018 Business.com rated Columbus one of the Top Five best cities for entrepreneurs and startups. Ohio is ranked No. 5 in the nation for headquarters of Fortune 500 companies, with Columbus home to the most in the state.

In 2015 Columbus was named by the Intelligent Community Forum as one of the seven top Smart Cities in the world.

In 2016 the Columbus metropolitan area's GDP was $130.8 billion, ranking it 29th largest in the U.S. and second largest in Ohio, ahead of Cleveland and just behind Cincinnati.

== Aviation ==
Historically, John Glenn Columbus International Airport, now the largest passenger airport in central Ohio and second busiest in the state after Cleveland, was once home to a North American Aviation factory (later North American/Rockwell). Aircraft built in Columbus include the North American F-86 Sabre, A-5 Vigilante, OV-10 Bronco, T-2 Buckeye, and components for the B-1 bomber, as well as numerous missiles and guidance systems. Columbus was also home to Skybus Airlines, a discount carrier which began flying in May 2007. and ceased operations on April 5, 2008. Columbus is home to several private charter aviation companies, including Capital City Jet, located at Bolton Field, Stratos Jet Charters, Charter Logic, Pulse Aviation, New Flight Charters, NetJets and JetRide.

Vaisala is a Finnish global aviation company with operations in Columbus, originally started by pioneering innovator Vilho Väisälä. The corporation recently signed a long-term contract with the National Oceanic and Atmospheric Administration to supply next-generation GPS dropsondes for hurricane reconnaissance. Honeywell operates facilities in Columbus, and German-based Siemens' Midwest facility is located here. Private aircraft-leasing giant NetJets is now based in Columbus, on a campus which recently saw a $220 million expansion.

== Banking ==
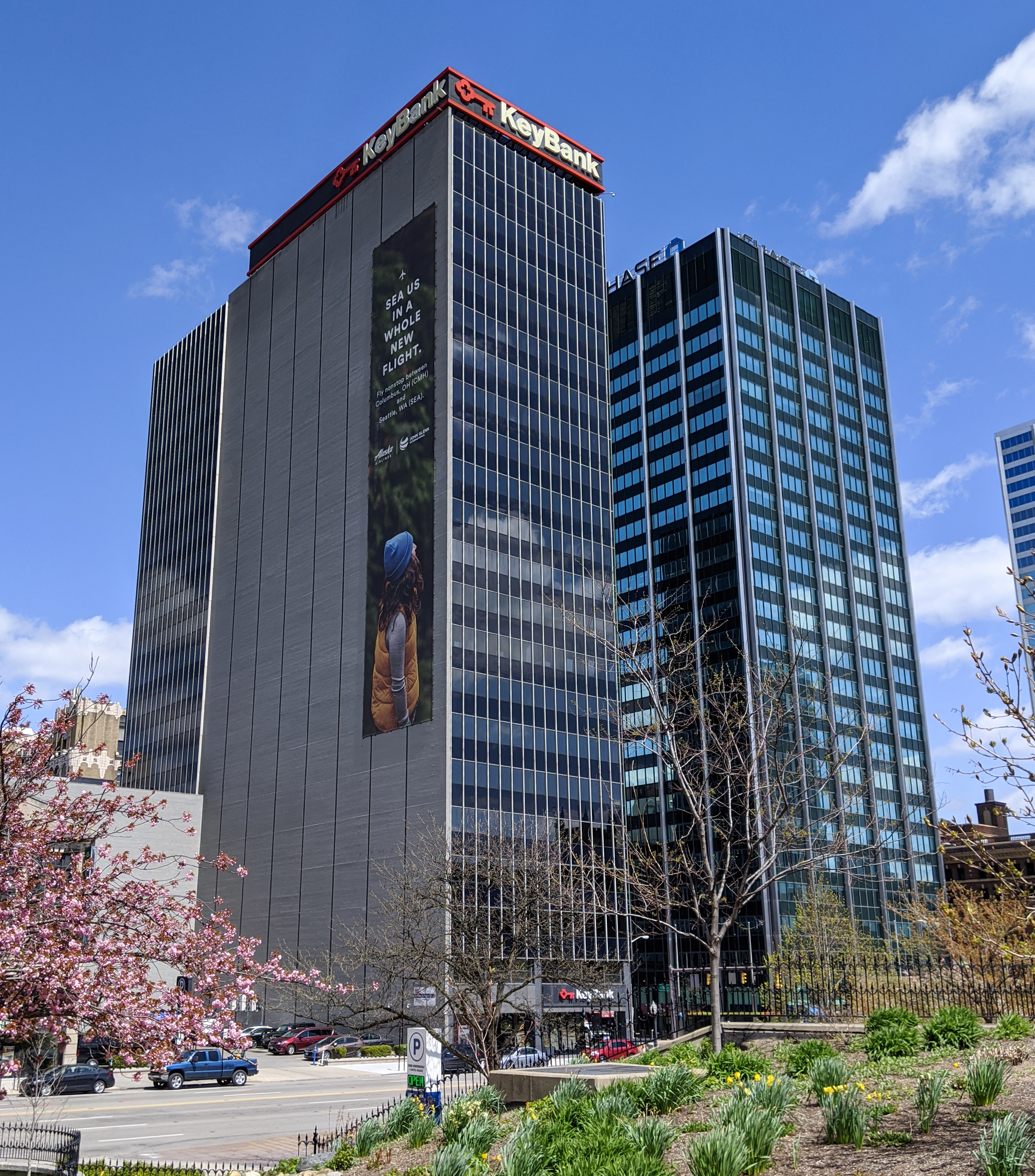
Key Bank Building and Chase Tower in downtown Columbus

Huntington Bancshares Inc., a Fortune 500 company, has its headquarters in the downtown area. Bank One was headquartered in Columbus until 1998, and J.P. Morgan Chase & Co., which acquired Bank One in 2004, continues to maintain a major presence in Columbus, with a large mortgage servicing unit in the city. First Financial Bank, PNC Bank (previously National City Bank), KeyBank, Heartland Bank, Charter One Bank, U.S. Bank, Citigroup, Fifth Third Bank, and Commerce National Bank all maintain a presence in Columbus.

== Defense ==
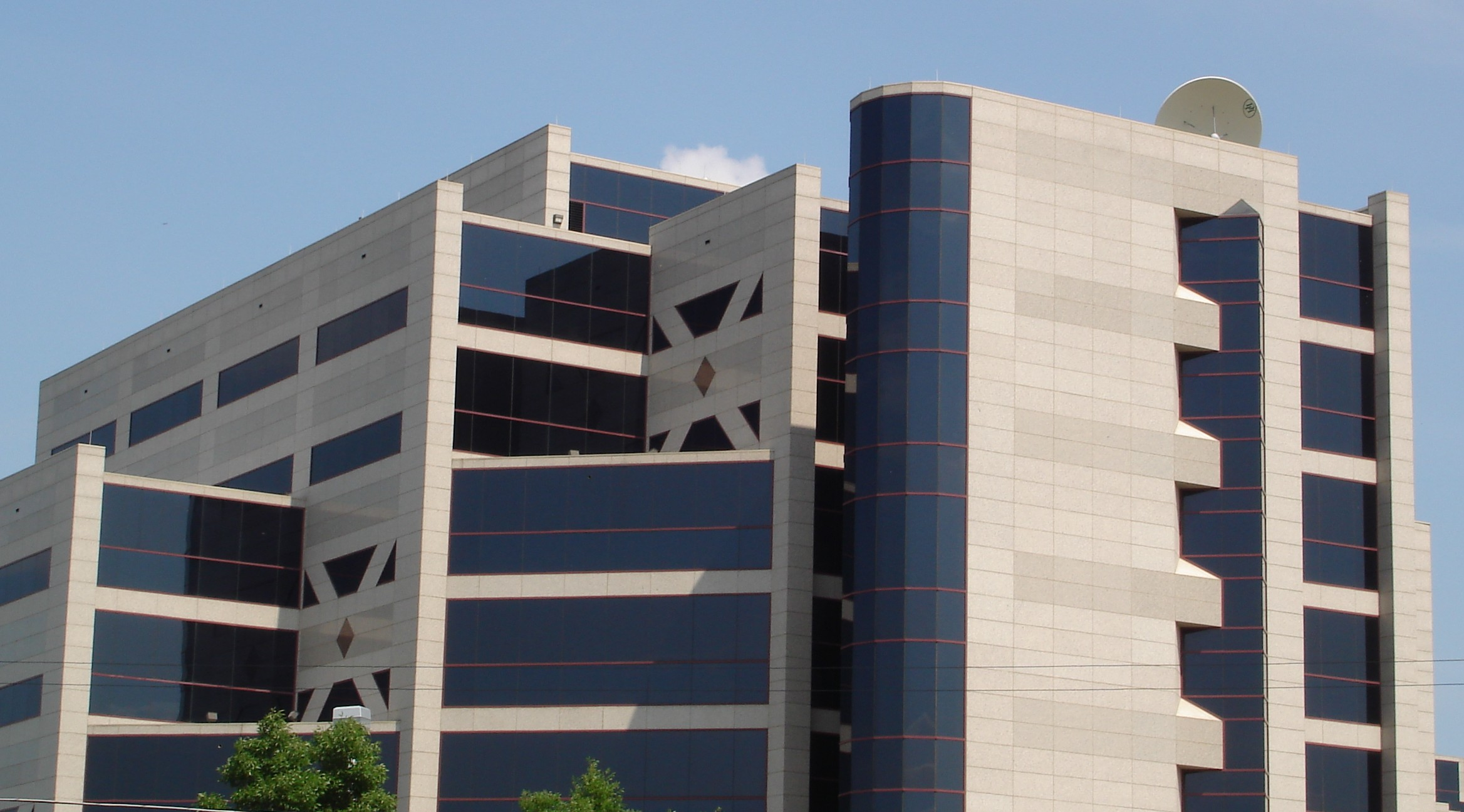
Columbus Defense Supply Center

One of the larger processing centers of the Defense Finance and Accounting Service (DFAS) is located in Columbus. The Department of Defense also operates the Defense Supply Center, Columbus (DSCC) east of downtown, which hosts the 391st Military Police Battalion and the 375th Criminal Investigations Division of the U.S. Army Reserve, along with elements of the Ohio National Guard. Rickenbacker International Airport, located south of the city, hosts the United States Air Force's Ohio National Guard 121st Air Refueling Wing. Fort Hayes, a historic military barrack, was located downtown. The Ohio National Guard Headquarters is located on the far north side of the city. Mission Essential Personnel, the government's leading source of linguists in Afghanistan, is based in the Easton Town Center.

== Fashion ==
Limited Brands (formerly known as The Limited, Inc.), a Fortune 500 company, is located on the east side of the city and is the parent company of Victoria's Secret and Bath & Body Works, among others.

Express and The Limited retail stores are also headquartered in Columbus and were formerly part of Limited Brands.

Abercrombie & Fitch, a Fortune 500 company and parent company of Hollister Co. (whose first store opened in Easton Town Center in 2000), and Abercrombie Kids, is based in the Columbus suburb of New Albany.

Fortune 500 company Big Lots is located in the city, as well as Schottenstein Stores Corp.

DSW Shoes are headquartered in Columbus, as well.

Restoration Hardware opened up a major customer service center just west of Downtown, in 2011.

Columbus is third, behind New York and Los Angeles, in employing fashion designers.

== Food and beverages ==
Ten restaurant chains are based in the Columbus area: Charley's Grilled Subs, Steak Escape, White Castle, Cameron Mitchell Restaurants, Bob Evans Restaurants, Max & Erma's, Damon's Grill, Donatos Pizza and Wendy's. Wendy's, a Fortune 500 company, operated its first store downtown as both a museum and a restaurant until March 2007 when the establishment was closed due to low revenue. The company is presently headquartered outside the city in nearby Dublin.

Budweiser has a major brewery located on the north side just south of I-270 and Worthington. Columbus is also home to many local-based micro breweries and pubs, including Barley's Brewing, Elevator-Draught Haus Brewing, Columbus Brewing Co., cb Beverage, Boathouse Brewery, BJ's Restaurant and Brewery, Gambrinus Brewing, and Biersch Brewing. The Brewery District, located just south of downtown, and next to the German Village, is home to many brewery pubs and restaurants. Scotland headquartered BrewDog established its Western Hemisphere headquarters in a 100,000 square foot brewery in Canal Winchester in 2017.

Asian frozen food manufacturer and ex-destination tiki restaurant Kahiki Foods is located on the East side of Columbus. Wasserstrom Company, a major supplier of equipment and supplies for restaurants, is located on the north side. Lancaster Colony Corporation, a manufacturer of candles and Marzetti food products, is headquartered in the city.

== Healthcare ==
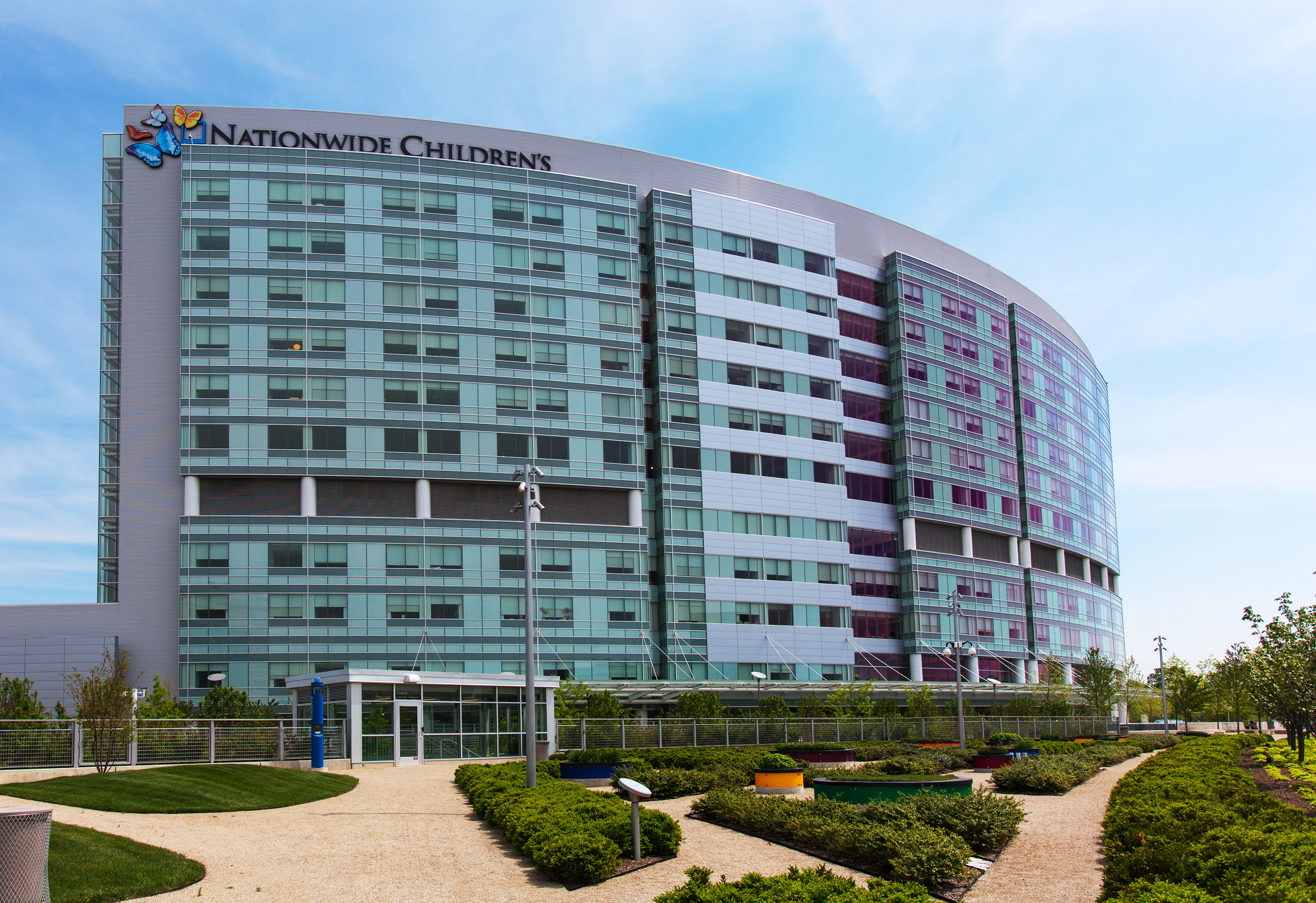
Nationwide Children's Hospital

Columbus is home to many outstanding hospitals, which employ well over 8,000 in the city. Grant Medical Center, located downtown, is part of Ohio Health, a faith-based, non-profit organization that has been serving Columbus since 1891. In 2009, Grant was ranked by U.S. News & World Report as one of the United States' best hospitals. Another Ohio Health-operated hospital, Riverside Methodist, located in north-central Columbus, was also named one of the country's best hospitals in 2009 by U.S. News & World Report.

Nationwide Children's Hospital is one of the country's premier children's hospitals, ranked in the top 10 of NIH-supported centers for their category, and is the fifth largest in the country. They specialize in surgical, neuroscience, rehabilitation, burn, dialysis and bone marrow areas. In 2018, U.S. News & World Report ranked this hospital No. 7 in its category.

Other local hospitals include the Ohio State University Medical Center (see Medical research), Mt. Carmel East and West facilities, Doctor's Hospital, Riverside Methodist Hospital, and University Hospital East, and there are many specialty locations throughout the city.

== Hospitality ==
Columbus's hospitality industry accounts for thousands of jobs in the area. There are 25,005 hotel rooms in the metropolitan area, and 3,280 downtown. Major hotels downtown include Westin's historic Great Southern Hotel, a uniquely designed and ultra-modern Hyatt Regency in the Arena District, an urban-themed DoubleTree Suites by Hilton Columbus Downtown, a Crowne Plaza Hotel, the Sheraton Columbus at Capitol Square, the Manhattan-styled Lofts Hotel and Suites, the cosmopolitan Renaissance Hotel, the old European-themed Ashland Springs Hotel, Drury Inn and Suites, and a new Hampton Inn and Suites designed to conform with the surroundings. The Hilton Easton, located in northeast Columbus, is a new, classically themed hotel. The Fort Rapids Water Resort is located just east of Downtown on Hilton Corporate Drive. The Concourse Hotel and Athletic Club is located at Port Columbus. University Plaza and the Blackwell Inn, a newly built, modern hotel, are in the University District, and several Marriotts, Residence Inns, Embassy Suites, Best Westerns, Red Roof Inns, Holiday Inns, Courtyards, and other franchise hotels are found throughout the city.

The architectural firm, HOK Chicago, was chosen to design the new 500+ room, $140 million convention hotel Downtown in collaboration with Hilton Hotels and the Franklin County Commissioners, breaking ground on July 13, 2010. The 126-room Hyatt Place, located on the Ohio State University campus, opened in September 2010.

== Insurance ==
Columbus is home to five insurance companies. Nationwide Insurance, a Fortune 500 company, has its international headquarters downtown in a large, multi-building complex that dominates the northern end of the downtown area. The other insurance companies in the city are Motorists Insurance, Grange Insurance, Safe Auto Insurance, and State Auto Mutual.

== Logistics ==
CSX Norfolk operates a $67 million intermodal railyard in the city, with plans for a second $130 million facility imminent in 2008. UPS has a large distribution center on the west side of the city. Major motor-freight companies in the city include Roadway Express, Estes Express Lines, Covenant Transport, Old Dominion Freight Line, and Overnite Transportation. Air cargo services companies operating at Rickenbacker International Airport include Federal Express, DHL/Airborne Logistics, Kuehne + Nagel, Scanwell, Walter J. Engel Co., Freight Expeditors, H A Logistics, Evergreen Airlines, Worldwide Flight Services, Nippon Express USA, Inc., and Panalpina, Inc.

== Manufacturing ==
Worthington Industries, a large steel-processing company and Fortune 500 company, is primarily located on the north side near Worthington. Columbus Steel Castings, now defunct, formerly Buckeye Steel Castings, operated North America's largest steel foundry on the south side of the city. Momentive Specialty Chemicals (formerly part of Borden, Inc.) is located downtown, and Ashland Inc. has a large facility in the Columbus area. Rogue Fitness, currently located approximately 2.5 miles (4.0 km) north of the city's downtown, is a manufacturer and distributor of strength and conditioning equipment

== Medical research ==
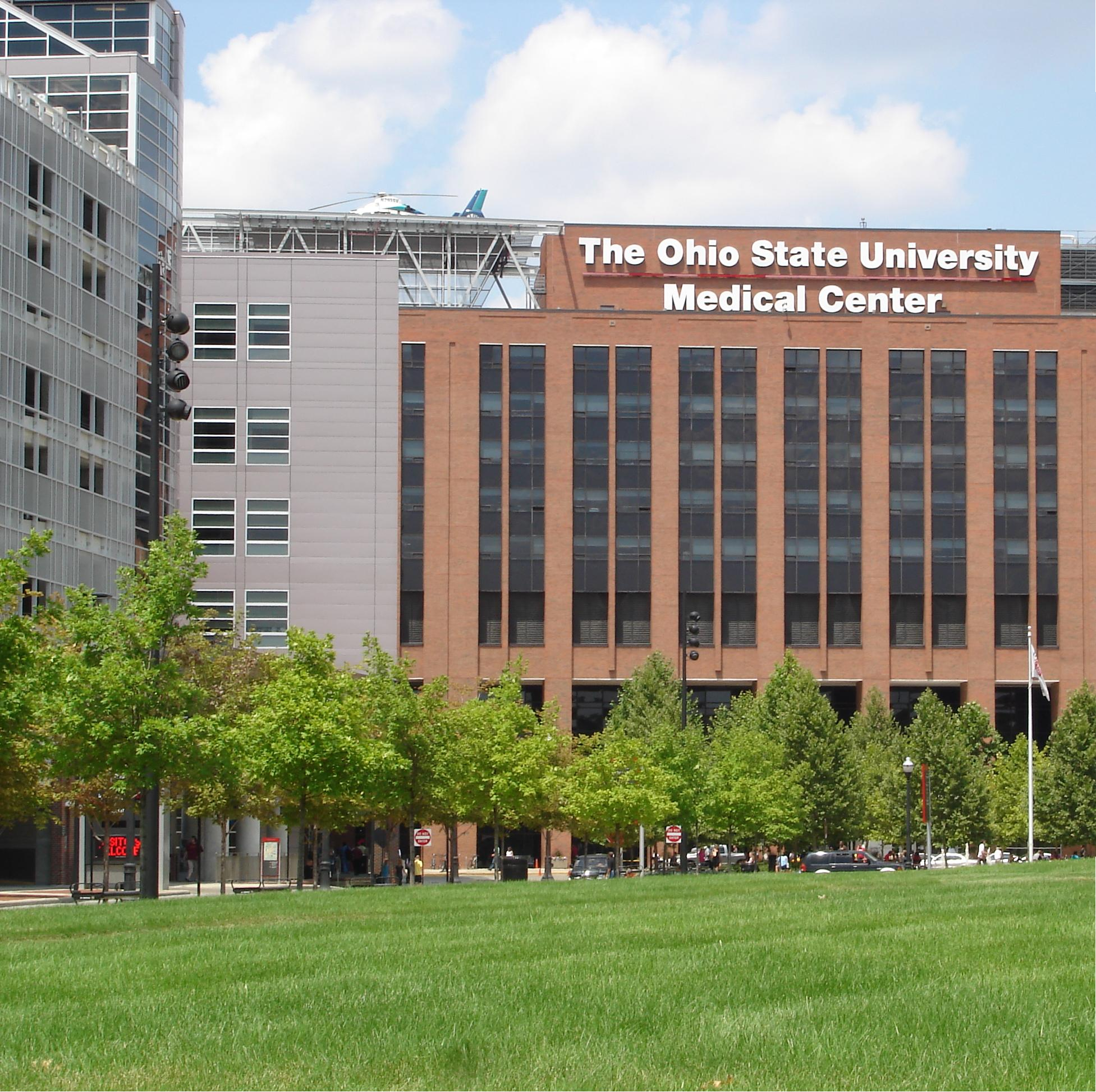
OSU Medical Center, University District

Columbus is home to an abundance of medical research and related institutions, including institutions such as the Battelle Memorial Institute, the Ohio State University Wexner Medical Center, and The Research Institute at Nationwide Children's Hospital.

In 2009, scientists at The [Nationwide] Research Institute developed a trial for an HIV vaccine from genetic research, while researchers at OSU developed a genetic injection treatment for the disease obesity. Other recent innovations in 2009 include an ear infection vaccine from The Research Institute.

The Ohio State University Medical Center has a history of medical research including many medical firsts and breakthroughs. The Ohio State University and Cleveland Clinic, a world-renowned medical institution in northeastern Ohio, recently licensed technology to PreCelleon, based in Columbus, to develop a tool to collect more cancerous cells for research. Battelle's West Jefferson biomedical center, just west of Columbus, in 2009 began studying the H1N1 virus and testing their existing technology to find a way to better detect it. The Wexner Medical Center at Ohio State University was ranked in U.S. News & World Report's elite "Honor Roll" for medical institutions in the country in 2009, marking the 17th year in a row OSU was honored.

Other medical operations in the area include the Fortune 500 company Cardinal Health, which has its headquarters in the Columbus suburb of Dublin (Cardinal was originally based in Columbus). The Ross Products Division of Abbott Laboratories, makers of Ensure nutritional drink and Similac infant formula, is headquartered in Columbus, with over 7,000 employees.

== Retail ==
- Polaris Fashion Place: stores include Saks Fifth Avenue, Von Maur, Brooks Brothers, and Coach.
- Easton Town Center: stores include Burberry, Michael Kors, Nordstrom, Louis Vuitton, Tiffany & Co, and the North Face.
- The Mall at Tuttle Crossing: stores include: JCPenney, Macy's, Banana Republic, H&M, and New York & Co.

== Technology and energy ==
Columbus has routinely been ranked No. 1 as the most up and coming technological city in America, aided by Battelle Memorial Institute, created in the 1920s by industrialist Gordon Battelle. Central Connecticut State University ranked Columbus No. 8 in the nation for Internet literacy in 2005, but by 2008 the city had slipped to No. 21. In 2009, Forbes ranked Columbus as the 29th most wired city in the country.

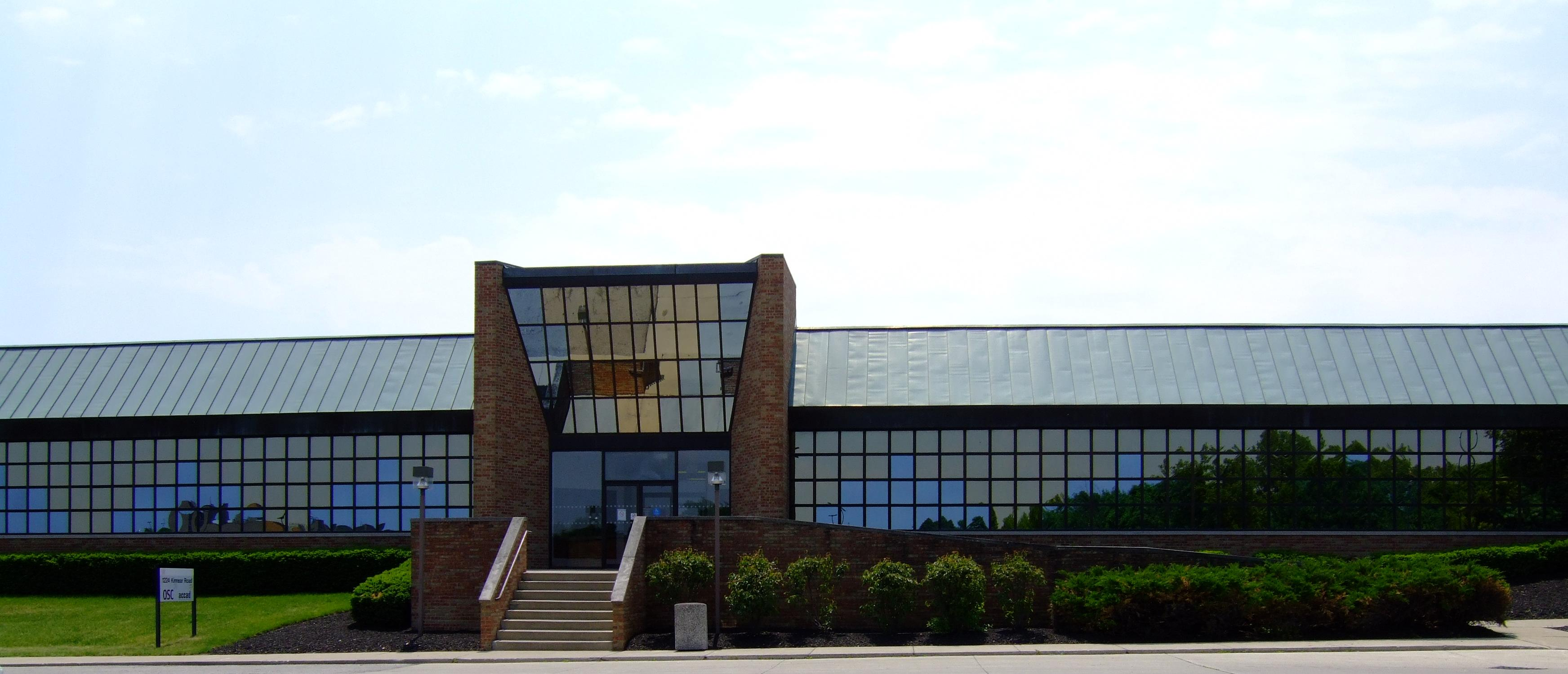
Ohio Supercomputer Center, University District

Columbus is home to the Ohio Supercomputer Center, founded in 1987, and located on the Ohio State University campus. It is available to research scientists, focusing on bio and data science, advanced materials, and engineering research. 1,850 miles of network infrastructure is utilized by the center through OARNet, providing internet access to over two million Ohioans as well as colleges and universities. The OSC partners with the U.S. Department of Defense, Education, and Energy, as well as the Air Force Research Laboratory, NASA, MIT Lincoln Laboratory, and Sandia National Laboratories, among other institutions.

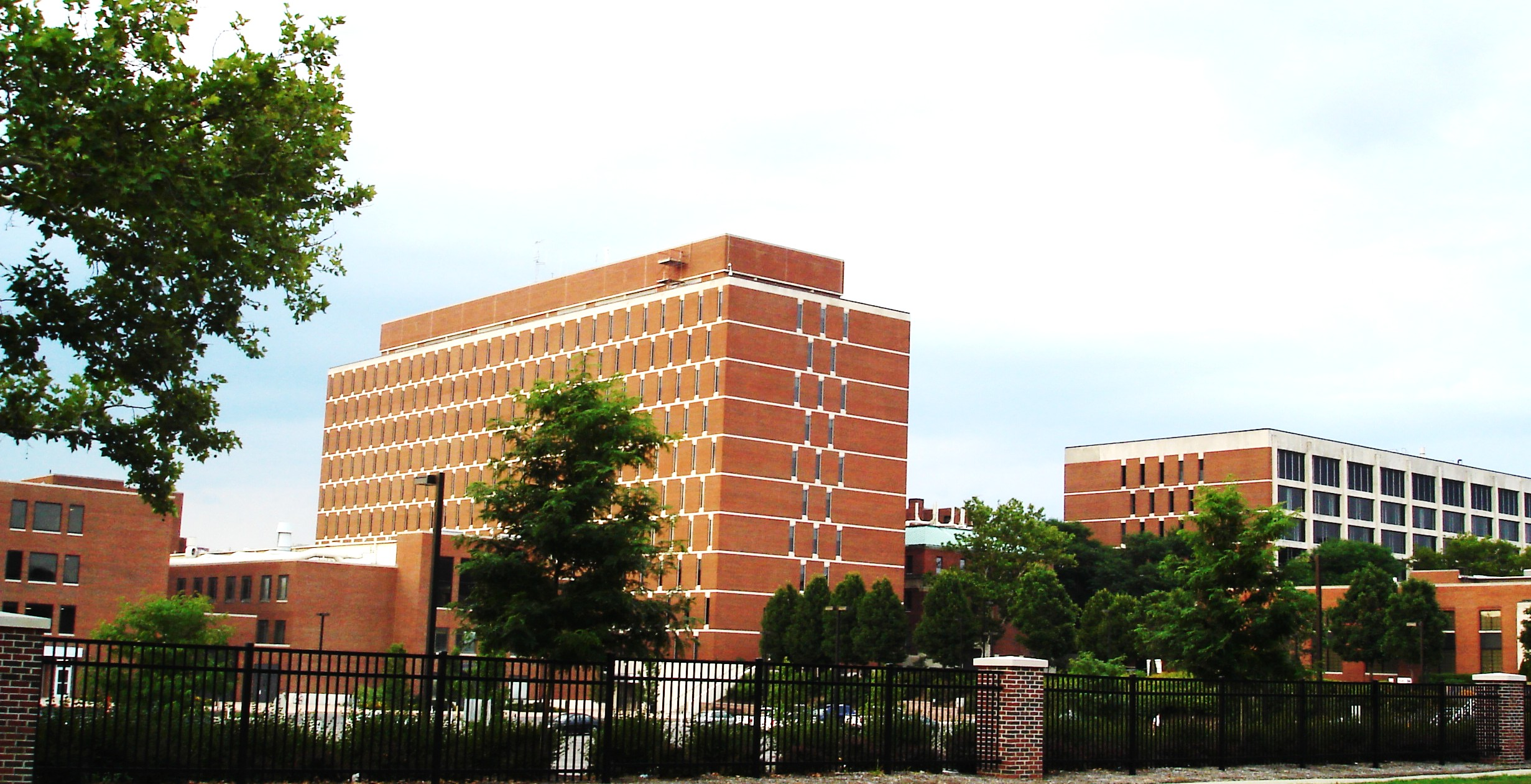
Battelle Memorial Institute, Harrison West

Many technology companies either call Columbus home or have significant operations in the area. The first major commercial Internet service provider in the United States, CompuServe, still has its roots in Columbus, although it has been owned by AOL since 1998. They started in Columbus in 1969 and first offered Internet service in 1979 with electronic mail services. Chemical Abstracts Service is located just north of the OSU campus, and is the "world's foremost clearinghouse for chemical research".

Sterling Commerce, a B2B software company, has its headquarters on the northwest side. Mettler Toledo, a manufacturer of precision scales and scientific equipment is headquartered in the area known as Polaris on the north side of the city. Columbus is home to interactive agencies and software development companies, with a concentration in Columbus' downtown and Arena District neighborhoods. Online Computer Library Center (OCLC), a leading library information company, is based in the Columbus area.

The Battelle Memorial Institute has played a key global role in the technological community over the last century, launching many products based on their discoveries. Battelle is the "world’s largest private contract research and development organization", managing labs and companies all over the world. In 2004, Battelle opened a new biotechnology and chemistry lab in Columbus. In 2009, Battelle was awarded 26 prestigious awards from R&D Magazine for developments, bringing their total to 217.

The multi-jurisdictional 315 Research + Technology Corridor was set up in 2006 to promote the area nationally and internationally. TechColumbus was also created in 2002 to help accelerate and support the growth of Central Ohio's tech economy.

American Electric Power, a Fortune 500 company, has its headquarters in downtown Columbus.

Alliance Data, Also a Fortune 500 company has recently arranged to move its headquarters to Columbus Ohio from its prior location in Plano, Texas.

Vertiv, a provider of equipment and services for data centers is based in Columbus.

== See also ==
- List of largest Central Ohio employers
- Economy of Ohio
