= OhioHealth Grady Memorial Hospital =

Hospital in Delaware, Ohio, U.S.

Geography
- Location: Delaware, Ohio, United States
- Coordinates: 40°18′22″N 83°05′24″W

Organization
- Type: Short Term Acute Care

Helipads
- Helipad: FAA LID: OH25

Links
- Website: http://www.ohiohealth.com/grady
- Lists: Hospitals in the United States

OhioHealth Grady Memorial Hospitalhas been the main hospital for Delaware, Ohio, United States, since 1904. Today it is a member hospital of OhioHealth, a not-for-profit, faith-based healthcare system.

== Services and clinical programs ==
=== Cancer care ===
The Cancer Services program at Grady Memorial is nationally recognized and certified by the American College of Surgeons, the American College of Radiology, and is a member of the Columbus Community Clinical Oncology Program, a clinical oncology research program established and funded by the National Cancer Institute. Participating in this consortium of 10 hospitals and 120 physicians gives Grady patients access to clinical trials of drugs and drug combinations not yet approved by the U.S. Food and Drug Administration (FDA).

=== Heart and vascular care ===
The physicians who see patients and perform heart and vascular procedures at Grady Memorial also are cardiologists at Riverside Methodist Hospital and Grant Medical Center. Grady Memorial offers a variety of heart and vascular services in its updated Cardiac Cath Lab.

=== Neurosciences ===
Grady Memorial is a member of the OhioHealth Stroke Network, a team of critical care and stroke professionals that work together to provide emergency care for stroke patients. Inpatient and Emergency Department consultations are provided, along with procedures or evaluation to determine if the patient should remain at Grady Memorial or be transferred to an OhioHealth Primary Stroke Center.

=== Emergency care ===
Grady Memorial is an Accredited Chest Pain Center exceeding criteria and undergoing an onsite review by accreditation specialists. Grady Memorial has earned consistently high patient satisfaction scores in its Emergency Department because of its inpatient "door-to-doc" times that average less than half the national average.
