= Robert E. Falcone =

American surgeon and artist

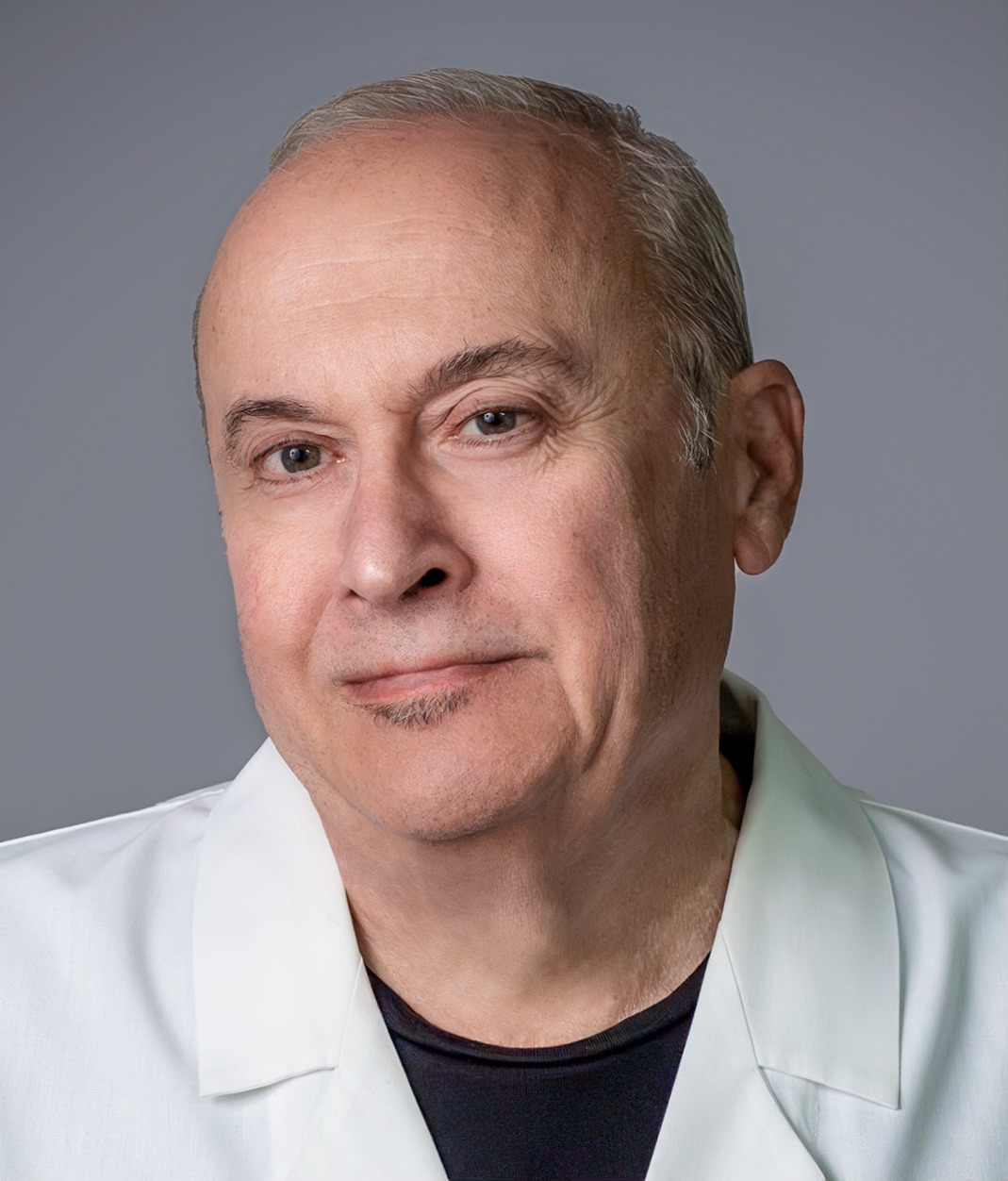
- Born: April 12, 1950 (age 76)
- Occupations: President Grant Medical Center; Clinical Professor of Surgery Ohio State University College of Medicine
- Known for: Trauma surgery

Robert Edward Falcone (born April 12, 1950) is an Italian-American surgeon. He is a fellow of the American College of Surgeons and the Society of Critical Care Medicine. He also serves as a clinical professor of surgery at the Ohio State University College of Medicine. He was the president of the Grant Medical Center and Columbus Medical Association.

== Career ==
In addition to being a fellow of the American College of Surgeons and the Society of Critical Care Medicine, he is affiliated with the American Association of Surgery for Trauma.

Falcone specializes in surgical and non-surgical treatment of injuries that present a risk of death. The stomach, colon, spleen, and pancreas are a few areas that he operate.

Falcone established Grant Medical Center Trauma Program (Urban Trauma and Teaching Hospital) in 1986 and ran it till 2006.

Falcone was honored for his commitment to the arts at the centennial celebration: Ohio Art League 100 in 100.

== Selected publications ==
- Thomas, Bruce; Vaccaro, Patrick; Falcone, Robert E.; Vasquez, Donald G. (January 2000). "Traumatic Massive Atheroembolism: Case Report and Literature Review". Vascular Surgery. 34 (1): 77–80. doi:10.1177/153857440003400117. ISSN 0042-2835.
- Rozycki, G. S.; Schmidt, J. A.; Ochsner, M. G.; Thomas, B.; Boulanger, B.; Davis, F.; Falcone, R. E.; Feliciano, D. V. (February 1998). "Early detection of hemoperitoneum by ultrasound examination of the right upper quadrant: a multicenter study". Journal of Trauma and Acute Care Surgery. 44 (2): 878–883. doi:10.1097/00005373-199811000-00006. ISSN 2163-0755. PMID 9820696.
- Werman, Howard A; Falcone, Robert E (May 1998). "Glottic Positioning of the Endotracheal Tube Tip: A Diagnostic Dilemma". Annals of Emergency Medicine. 31 (5): 643–646. doi:10.1016/S0196-0644(98)70213-6. PMID 9581151.
- Thomas, Bruce W.; Falcone, Robert E. (April 1998). "Confirmation of Nasogastric Tube Placement by Colorimetric Indicator Detection of Carbon Dioxide: A Preliminary Report". Journal of the American College of Nutrition. 17 (2): 195–197. doi:10.1080/07315724.1998.10718746. ISSN 0731-5724. PMID 9550464.
- Ohimor, Stephen O; Falcone, Robert E (July 1996). "Phenytoin Prophylaxis in Posttraumatic Head Injury". Journal of Pharmacy Technology. 12 (4): 160–164. doi:10.1177/875512259601200410. ISSN 8755-1225.
- Ohimor, Stephen O; Falcone, Robert E (July 1996). "Phenytoin Prophylaxis in Posttraumatic Head Injury". Journal of Pharmacy Technology. 12 (4): 160–164. doi:10.1177/875512259601200410.
- Stanhope, Kevin; Falcone, Robert; Quinlin, William; Werman, Howard (July 1996). "Helicopter Dispatch: A time study". Air Medical Journal. 15 (3): 128. doi:10.1016/S1067-991X(96)90042-5.
