= OhioHealth Dublin Methodist Hospital =

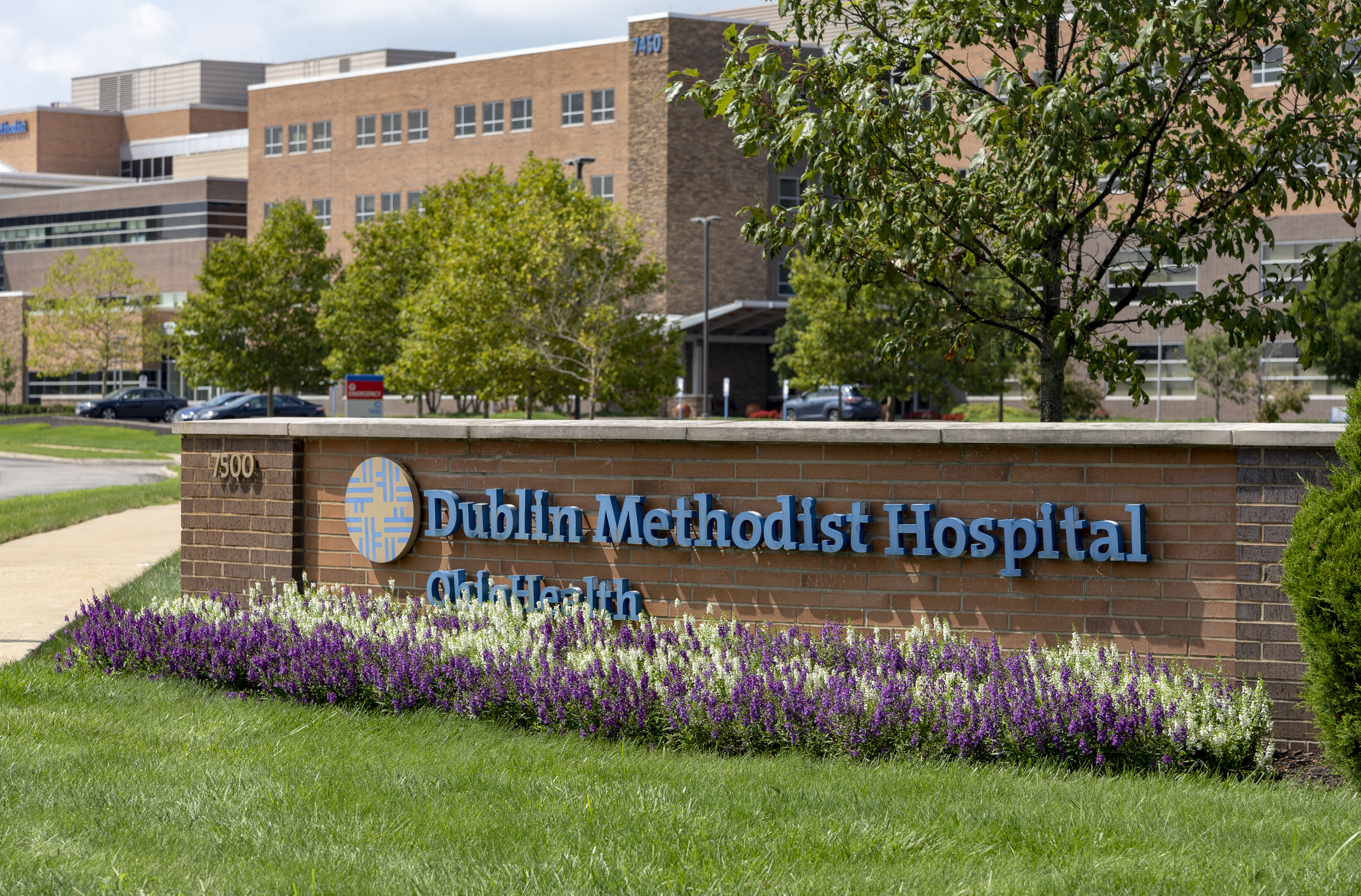

Geography
- Location: 7500 Hospital Dr, Dublin, Ohio, Ohio, United States
- Coordinates: 40°06′05″N 83°09′57″W

Organization
- Type: Short Term Acute Care

Services
- Beds: 107

History
- Founded: 2008

Links
- Website: www.ohiohealth.com/Dublinmethodist
- Lists: Hospitals in Ohio

OhioHealth Dublin Methodist Hospital is a, 325,000-square-foot (30,200 m^{2}), primary care hospital in Dublin, Ohio. Dublin Methodist is a member hospital of OhioHealth, a not-for-profit, faith-based healthcare system. It is located off U.S. Route 33 and is accessible from the Central Ohio Transit Authority (COTA) public transport network. Dublin Methodist was the first full-service hospital to be built in Central Ohio in the last 25 years, opening in January 2008.

As part of the OhioHealth system of hospitals, Dublin Methodist includes services such as 24-hour emergency department, intensive care beds and private rooms, women's health services (including obstetrics), as well as inpatient and outpatient surgical services in orthopedics, spine and pain management.

== Design and construction ==
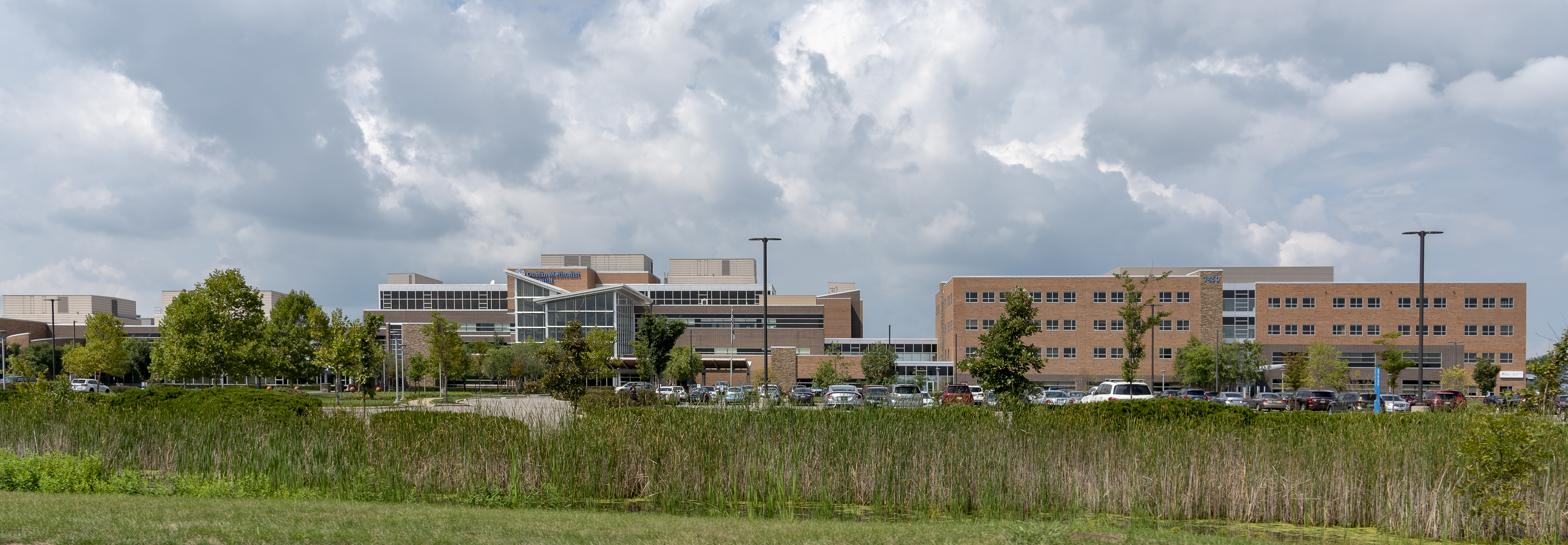
Front of Dublin Methodist Hospital

Dublin Methodist was designed with an emphasis on family spaces, natural light and a focus on comfort such as all private rooms with a sleeping couch for guests. The hospital was also intended to be a quiet environment including the use of electronic communication. There is no overhead paging, and special ceiling tiles are used in common areas to absorb sound. Hospital courtyards and rooftops include 13 gardens.

It was named one of the “Most Wired” hospitals in America in a survey that assessed the ways hospitals use information technologies for quality, customer service, public health and safety, business processes and workforce issues.

The hospital cost $150 million to construct. The contractor on the project was Elford/Gilbane Building Company. The architect during construction was Karlsberger and built by Elford/Gilbane Building Company.

== Services ==
Dublin Methodist Hospital received the Outstanding Patient Experience Award in 2017.

As part of the OhioHealth system, Dublin Methodist has specially monitored eICU intensive care beds monitoring patients 24/7 with video, audio and vital sign monitors linking to intensive care experts at Riverside Methodist Hospital to enhance the safety for critically ill patients. To preserve patients privacy the eICU equipment has no recording capabilities with either the audio or video system and the camera is only turned toward the patient periodically.

Critical care beds are equipped to adapt to a patient's changing condition by bringing monitoring equipment to the bedside, rather than moving the patient throughout the hospital.

Outpatient and inpatient services at Dublin Methodist Hospital include:

- Behavioral and Mental Health
- Cancer Care
- Ear Nose and Throat
- Electronic Intensive Care Unit (eICU)
- Gastroenterology and Endoscopy
- Heart and Vascular
- Imaging and Radiology
- Maternity
- Orthopedics
- Surgery

For the use of staff, patients and visitors the hospital has two catering establishments Starbucks and The Waterfall Café.

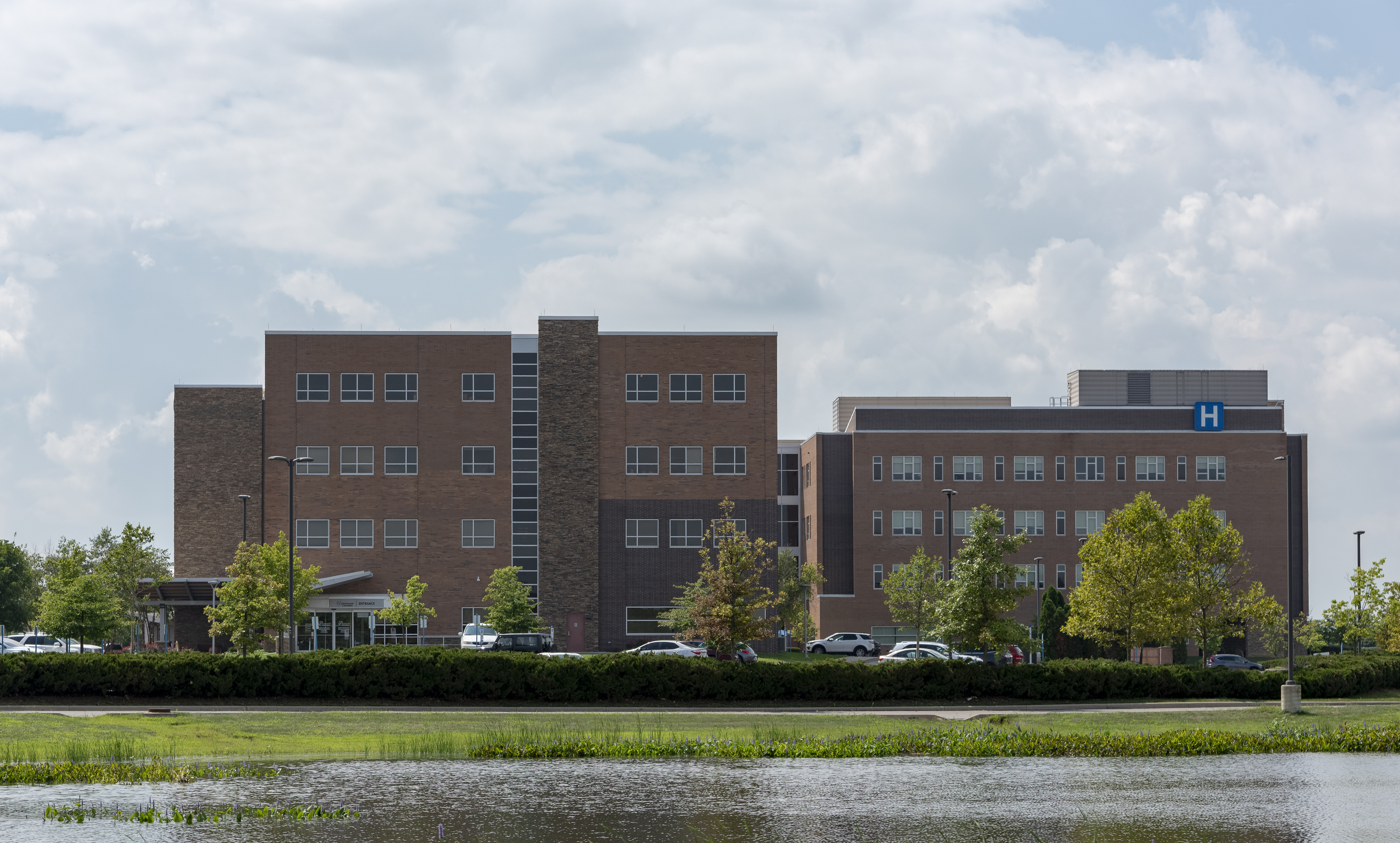
East of Dublin Methodist Hospital
