= GBQ =

GBQ may refer to:

- Bozom language
- GBQ Partners, an American professional services firm
- Gigabecquerel (GBq)
- Grande Bibliothèque du Québec
- Guangzhou North railway station, China Railway telegraph code GBQ
