= List of largest Central Ohio employers =

The following is a list of the forty largest employers in the Columbus MSA as of 2016. Asterisks denote companies headquartered locally.

Company/Organization	Sector	Local Full-time Employment
Ohio State University*	Education	29,685
The State of Ohio*	Government	22,030
JPMorgan Chase	Financial Activities	16,975
OhioHealth*	Health Care	16,000
Nationwide*	Financial Activities	11,235
United States Government	Government	10,800
City of Columbus*	Government	8,653
Columbus Public Schools*	Education	8,611
Mount Carmel Health System*	Health Care	8,448
Honda of America Manufacturing, Inc.	Manufacturing	7,400
Franklin County*	Government	6,048
Nationwide Children's Hospital*	Health Care	5,762
Kroger Company	Retail Trade	5,417
L Brands*	Retail Trade	5,200
Huntington Bancshares Inc.*	Financial Activities	4,170
Cardinal Health*	Health Care	4,030
Medco Health Solutions	Health Care	3,831
American Electric Power*	Utilities	3,527
Whirlpool	Manufacturing	2,900
Battelle Memorial Institute*	Professional Services	2,618
Southwestern City Schools*	Education	2,500
Abbott Nutrition	Manufacturing	2,055
Alliance Data	Information	2,030
Emerson Network/Liebert Corporation*	Control Systems	2,000
State Farm Insurance	Financial Activities	1,894
Dublin City Schools*	Education	1,750
TS Tech	Manufacturing	1,720
Hilliard City Schools*	Education	1,700
Olentangy Local Schools*	Education	1,700
Teleperformance	Information	1,620
DHL Supply Chain*	Logistic	1,600
Giant Eagle	Retail Trade	1,600
Ashland, Inc.	Chemicals/Technology	1,500
McGraw-Hill	Publishing	1,495
Big Lots, Inc.*	Retail Trade	1,310
Chemical Abstracts*	Information	1,300
Worthington Industries*	Manufacturing	1,229
Anchor-Hocking	Manufacturing	1,200
Aetna	Health Care	1,180
Anthem	Health Care	1,129
Boehringer Roxane	Pharmaceuticals	1,110

Below is a list of the largest employers in the Columbus MSA as of 2004.

Company/Organization	Sector	Local Full-time Employment
The State of Ohio	Government	26,037
Ohio State University	Public Education	17,361
United States Government	Government	13,300
JPMorgan Chase	Financial Activities	12,130
Nationwide	Financial Activities	11,293
OhioHealth	Health Care	8,398
Columbus City Schools	Public Education	8,024
City of Columbus	Government	7,919
Limited Brands	Corp. Mgt./Retail Trade	7,200
Honda of America Manufacturing, Inc.	Manufacturing	6,350
Franklin County	Government	6,218
Wal-Mart Stores	Retail Trade	6,100
Mount Carmel Health System	Health Care	5,558
Kroger Company	Retail Trade	4,632
Wendy's International, Inc.	Corp. Mgt./Retail Trade	4,500
American Electric Power	Utilities	3,900
Huntington Bancshares Inc.	Financial Activities	3,500
AT&T Ohio (formerly SBC Ohio)	Information	3,000
Ross Products Division, Abbott Labs	Manufacturing	2,800
Nationwide Children's Hospital	Health Care	2,706
Medco Health Solutions, Inc.	Health Care/Wholesale Trade	2,528
South-Western City School District	Public Education	2,516
Battelle Memorial Institute	Professional Services	2,368
Retail Ventures, Inc.	Corp. Mgt./Retail Trade	2,170
Big Lots, Inc.	Corp. Mgt./Retail Trade	2,100
Discover Financial Services, Inc.	Financial Activities	2,100
Cardinal Health	Health Care/Wholesale Trade	2,000
Dispatch Printing Company	Information	1,900
State Farm	Financial Activities	1,795
National City Corp.	Financial Activities	1,780
Alliance Data Systems	Information	1,757
Hilliard City Schools	Public Education	1,688
NetJets, Inc.	Transportation	1,650
Owens Corning	Manufacturing	1,531
ARC Industries, Inc.	Manufacturing	1,500
Teleperformance (formerly CallTech Communications LLC)	Professional Services	1,500
Dublin City Schools	Public Education	1,482
United Parcel Service	Transportation	1,445
Westerville City Schools	Public Education	1,441
Ashland, Inc.	Wholesale Trade	1,363
