= OhioHealth Doctors Hospital =

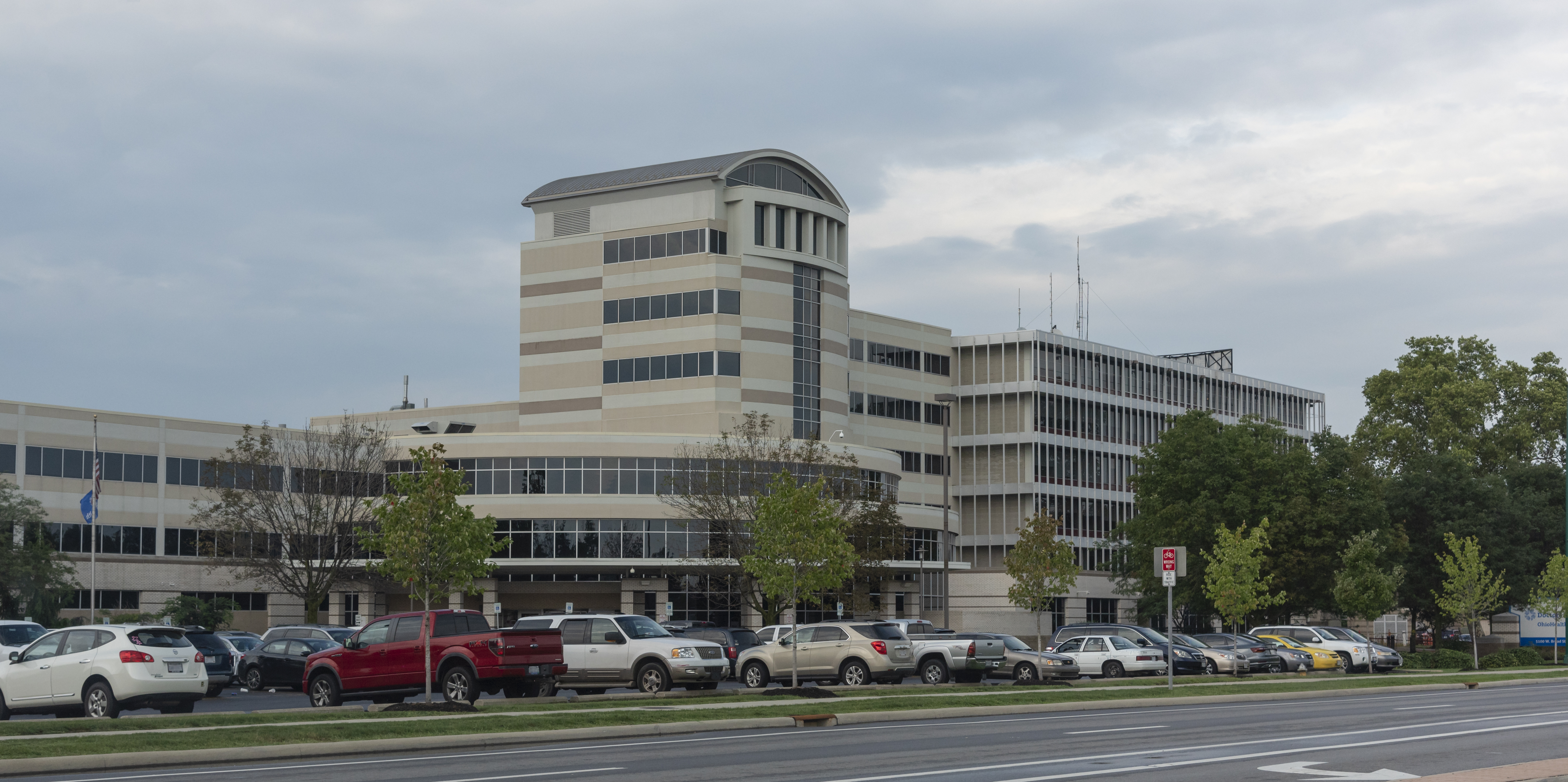

Geography
- Location: 5100 W Broad St, Columbus, Ohio, Columbus, Ohio, United States
- Coordinates: 39°57′09″N 83°08′17″W

Organization
- Type: Teaching, faith-based

Services
- Beds: 213

Links
- Website: www.ohiohealth.com/doctors
- Lists: Hospitals in Ohio

OhioHealth Doctors Hospital is a 213-bed tertiary care teaching hospital located in Columbus in the U.S. state of Ohio. Doctors Hospital operates the second largest osteopathic medical training program in the United States. Each year, the hospital trains 160 physicians in residencies and fellowships.

In 2013, Doctors Hospital was ranked #30 in the State of Ohio, #4 in the Columbus, Ohio metropolitan area, and ranked highly in pulmonology by the U.S. News & World Report. In the last year with available data, Doctors Hospital had 9,338 admissions, performed 1,841 inpatient and 3,736 outpatient surgeries, and its emergency department had 67,840 visits.

Doctors Hospital is accredited by the American Osteopathic Association's Healthcare Facilities Accreditation Program. Doctors Hospital is also an Accredited Chest Pain Center by The Joint Commission. The cancer care program is accredited as a Teaching Hospital Cancer Program with commendations in clinical research and community education by the American College of Surgeons Commission on Cancer.

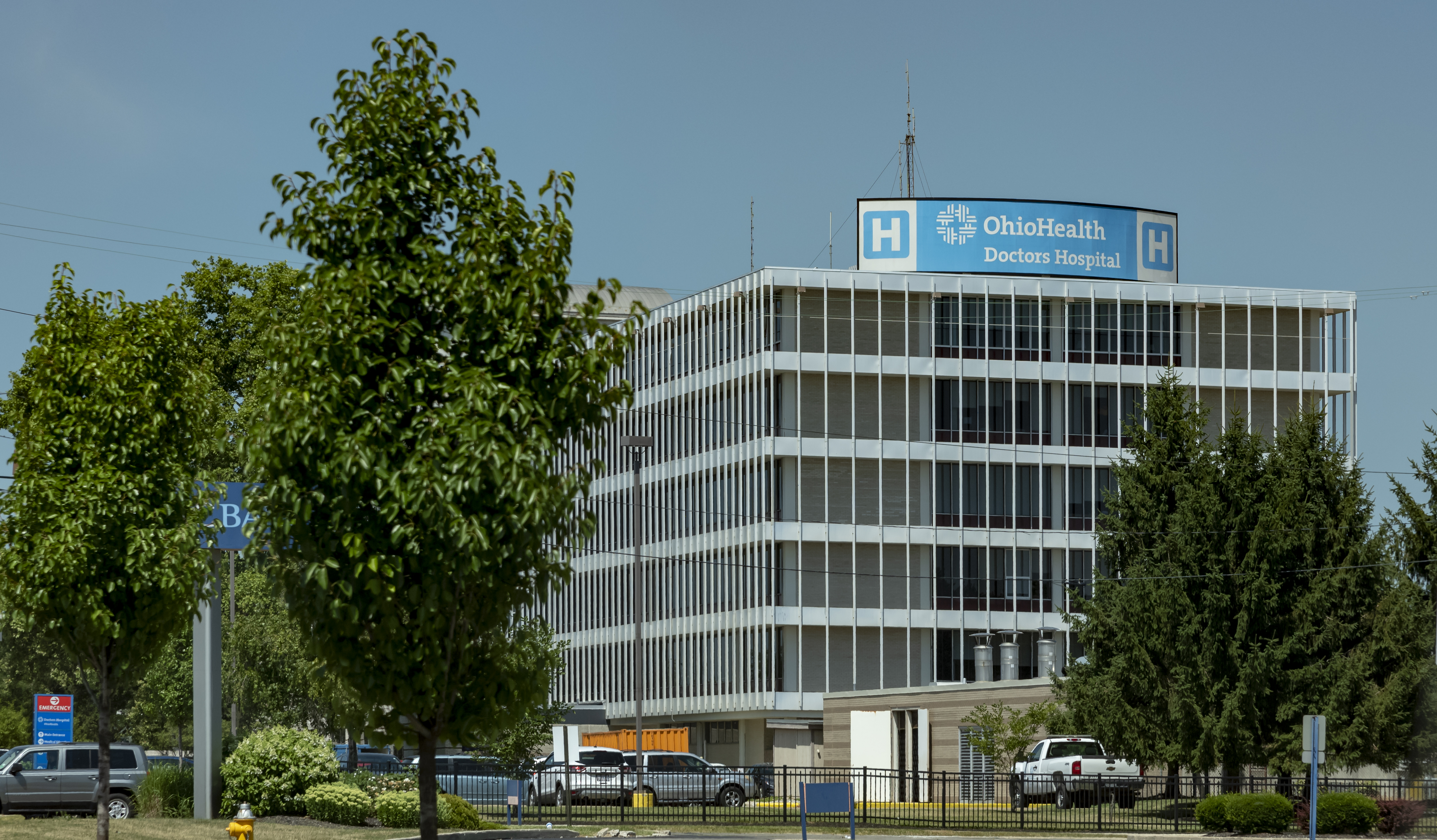
Front view from the southeast

== History ==
Doctors Hospital opened in 1940 as the first osteopathic healthcare institution in Central Ohio. In 1998, Doctors Hospital became a member hospital of OhioHealth, a not-for-profit, faith-based healthcare system in Columbus, Ohio. Its present facility opened in 1963 as Doctors Hospital West.

== Services and Clinical Programs ==
Doctors Hospital is an Accredited Chest Pain Center according to The Joint Commission. Heart patients receive treatment an average of 30 minutes faster than the American College of Cardiology recommends.

In 2011, Doctors Hospital was named one of the nation's 50 Top Cardiovascular Hospitals in the Teaching Hospitals with Cardiovascular Residency Programs comparison group by Thomson Reuters.

== Osteopathic Teaching ==
With the second largest osteopathic training program in the U.S., Doctors Hospital trains more than 160 physicians each year in 17 specialties and subspecialties. A number of residency and fellowship programs are offered.

== Accreditation ==
Doctors Hospital is accredited by the American Osteopathic Association's Healthcare Facilities Accreditation Program. Doctors Hospital is also an Accredited Chest Pain Center by The Joint Commission. The cancer care program is accredited as a Teaching Hospital Cancer Program with commendations in clinical research and community education by the American College of Surgeons Commission on Cancer. Doctors Hospital is accredited by the National Accreditation Program for Breast Centers.
