= OhioHealth =

US not-for-profit health network

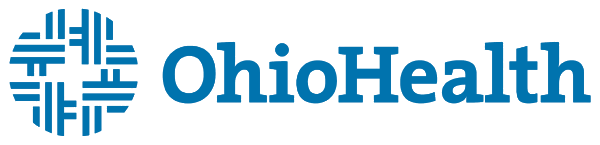

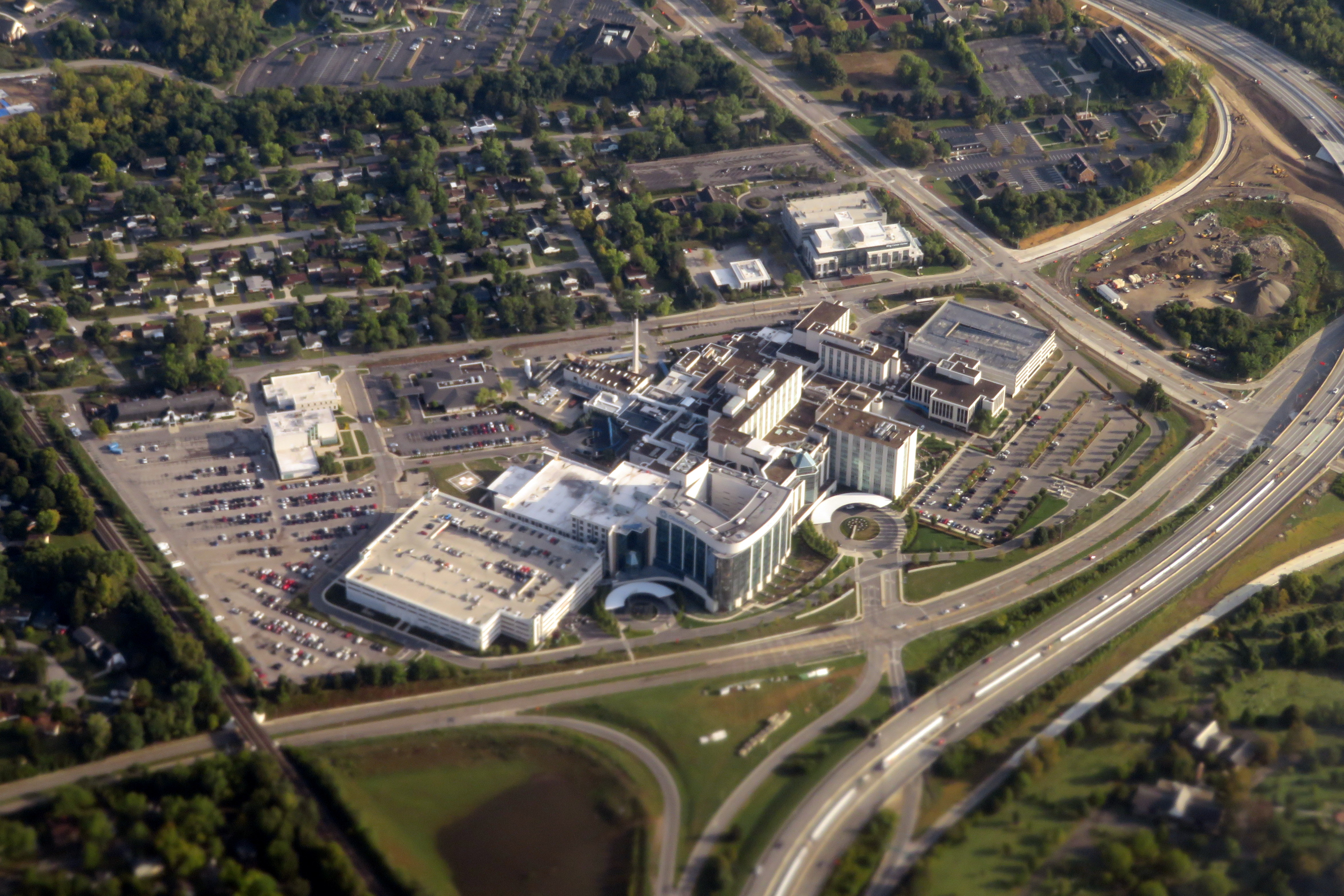
- Riverside Methodist Hospital, OhioHealth's largest facility and across the street from its headquarters

Geography
- Location: 3430 OhioHealth Parkway, Columbus, Ohio

Organisation
- Type: District
- Religious affiliation: United Methodist Church

Services
- Emergency department: Level I and II Trauma Centers

History
- Founded: 1984

Links
- Website: www.ohiohealth.com

OhioHealth is a not-for-profit system of hospitals and healthcare providers based in Columbus and the Central Ohio area. The system consists of 16 hospitals, 300+ ambulatory sites, hospice, home health, medical equipment and other health services spanning 55 Ohio counties. As of May 2025, the organization has 35,000 physicians, associates, and volunteers, with more than $6.3 billion in net revenue.

== History ==
=== Early beginnings ===
OhioHealth can trace its origins back to 1891, with the creation of Protestant Hospital Association, the fourth hospital in Columbus, and the first not associated with the Roman Catholic Church. In 1922, this hospital became White Cross Hospital, affiliated with the Ohio Methodist Episcopal Conference, but due to financial difficulty during the Great Depression, only the United Methodist Church was able to continue providing support.

The hospital grew at a quick pace and in 1958 it broke ground on its current location at West North Broadway and Olentangy River Road. To reflect its new location, the hospital was named Riverside Methodist. White Cross continued operating under the same name at its Short North location into the 1970s. At its new location, Riverside Methodist grew at a rapid pace well into the 1980s, expanding into new fields of medicine all the time.

=== Formation of U.S. Health ===
In September 1984, amidst much change in the United States' healthcare system, U.S. Health Corporation of Columbus was formed to meet the demands of the changing healthcare environment. After much negotiating with the West Ohio Conference of the United Methodist Church, the hospital's sponsor, Riverside Methodist became a subsidiary of U.S. Health. In 1988, Mercy Hospital joined the U.S. Health network, and over time became Southern Ohio Medical Center, which eventually regained independent status. In 1986, Marion General Hospital joined the system, allowing U.S. Health to become one of the Midwest's largest health systems. In 1988, Grant Medical Center became a member. In 1992, Hardin Memorial Hospital joined the network as well. In 1997, after settling a lawsuit with US Healthcare Inc., of Blue Bell, Pennsylvania, (now merged with Aetna), U.S. Health Corporation became OhioHealth.

=== Restructuring ===
In July 2022, OhioHealth announced the pending elimination of 567 jobs from their information technology department and 70 jobs from their revenue cycle department, scheduled to be completed by January 3, 2023. OhioHealth explained that the decision was made to enable them to become a "more patient-centric organization", and that they plan to retain 128 IT positions, as well as 1,390 revenue cycle positions.

== Reputation ==
OhioHealth was named by Thomson Reuters as one of the 10 best healthcare systems in America three years in a row. OhioHealth also has been recognized by Fortune magazine as one of the “100 Best Companies to Work For” from 2007 through 2018. In addition, U.S. News & World Report ranked Riverside Methodist Hospital's neuroscience program 38 out of 50 on its list of “America’s Best Hospitals” for neurology and neurosurgery in 2015-2016.

== Facilities ==
OhioHealth currently operates 16 hospitals with more than 2,000 licensed beds, 300 clinical locations including free standing outpatient and physician offices.

Member hospitals include Riverside Methodist Hospital, Grant Medical Center, Doctors Hospital, Grady Memorial Hospital, Dublin Methodist Hospital, Hardin Memorial Hospital, Marion General Hospital, Grove City Methodist Hospital, Berger Hospital, OhioHealth Mansfield, Shelby Hospital, O'Bleness Hospital, Southeastern Ohio Medical Center, Morrow County Hospital, Van Wert Hospital, and Pickerington Methodist Hospital. OhioHealth is a health ministry of the West Ohio Conference of the United Methodist Church.

== See also ==
- List of hospitals in the United States
- List of hospitals in Ohio
