= GBQ Partners =

GBQ Partners, LLC
- Type: Limited Liability Company
- Industry: Professional Services
- Founded: Columbus, Ohio, U.S. (1953)
- Headquarters: Columbus, Ohio, U.S.
- Key people: Darci Congrove, Managing Director
- Services: Audit; Tax; Consulting
- Number of employees: 100+ (April 2009)
- Website: www.gbq.com

GBQ Partners, LLC is a professional services firm. Founded in 1953, GBQ has grown organically and through acquisition to over 100 associates, making it the largest Columbus-owned accounting firm.

== History ==
Founded in 1953, GBQ has grown organically and through acquisition to become the largest independent accounting and consulting firm in Central Ohio.

In 1953, Morris W. Groner founded the Firm. Later, Jack Boyle and Ron Quillin became partners and Groner, Boyle & Quillin was formed. In 1990, Groner, Boyle and Quillin moved to the Brewery District, near Columbus' historic German Village. GBQ has grown to be the largest independent accounting and consulting firm in Central Ohio with over 100 associates including 13 partners.

In 1996, the last of the named partners, Ron Quillin, retired. Wade Kozich assumed the responsibilities of Managing Director at that time and served for 14 years, leading the firm through a period of significant growth and market expansion. In 1996, GBQ became an independent member of the BDO Seidman Alliance. BDO is one of the largest accounting and consulting organizations in the world. BDO Seidman serves clients through more than 160 locations in its US network and exploits the global resources of over 500 member firms in 95 countries.

Informally known around town as GBQ, the Firm officially changed its name to GBQ Partners LLC in 1999. In 2008, the firm moved to 230 West Street in the Arena District of Columbus, OH. In 2008, GBQ purchased the business valuation division of Goelzer Investment Management in Indianapolis, IN and opened a second office.

GBQ's clients are primarily closely held businesses in the Central Ohio middle market, though the firm serves clients that range in size from start-up companies to those with more than $1 billion in revenue. Key industries served include manufacturing, distribution, construction, real estate, service and nonprofit organizations. GBQ service lines include traditional assurance and tax services, as well as business valuations, forensic accounting and expert witness testimony, bankruptcy and turnaround consulting, state & local tax consulting, profit enhancement and management consulting, IT risk management and a variety of consulting services for physician practices and healthcare companies.
