= OhioHealth Riverside Methodist Hospital =

Hospital in Columbus, Ohio

- OhioHealth
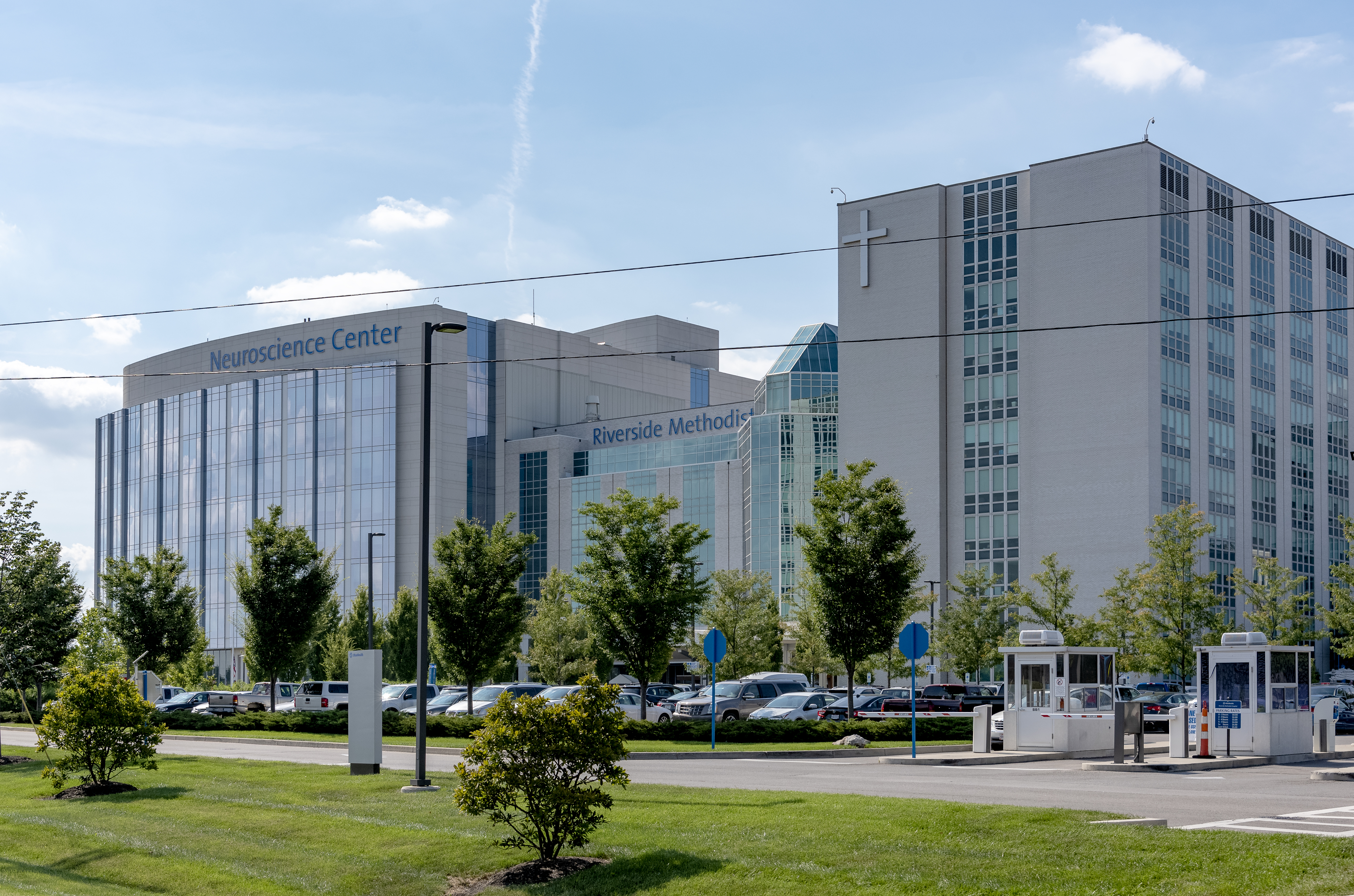

Geography
- Location: 3535 Olentangy River Road, Columbus, Ohio, United States
- Coordinates: 40.031306°N 83.036138°W

Organization
- Type: General

Services
- Emergency department: Level II trauma center
- Beds: 1,059

Helipads
- Helipad: FAA LID: 9OI9

History
- Founded: June 1892

Links
- Website: www.ohiohealth.com/riverside
- Lists: Hospitals in Ohio

OhioHealth Riverside Methodist Hospital is the largest member hospital of OhioHealth, a not-for-profit, faith-based healthcare system located in Columbus, Ohio.

As a regional tertiary care hospital, Riverside Methodist is host to a number of specialty centers and services, including Neuroscience and Stroke, Heart and Vascular, Maternity and Women's Health, Cancer Care, Trauma Center II, Hand and Microvascular, Surgery and Minimally Invasive Surgeries, Orthopedics, Imaging, and Bariatric Surgery. U.S. News & World Report regionally ranked Riverside Methodist Hospital the number 9 best performing among hospitals in Ohio, number 2 in Columbus metro area, rated high performing in four specialties and procedures and a nationally ranked hospital, number 49, in Neurology & Neurosurgery.

== History ==
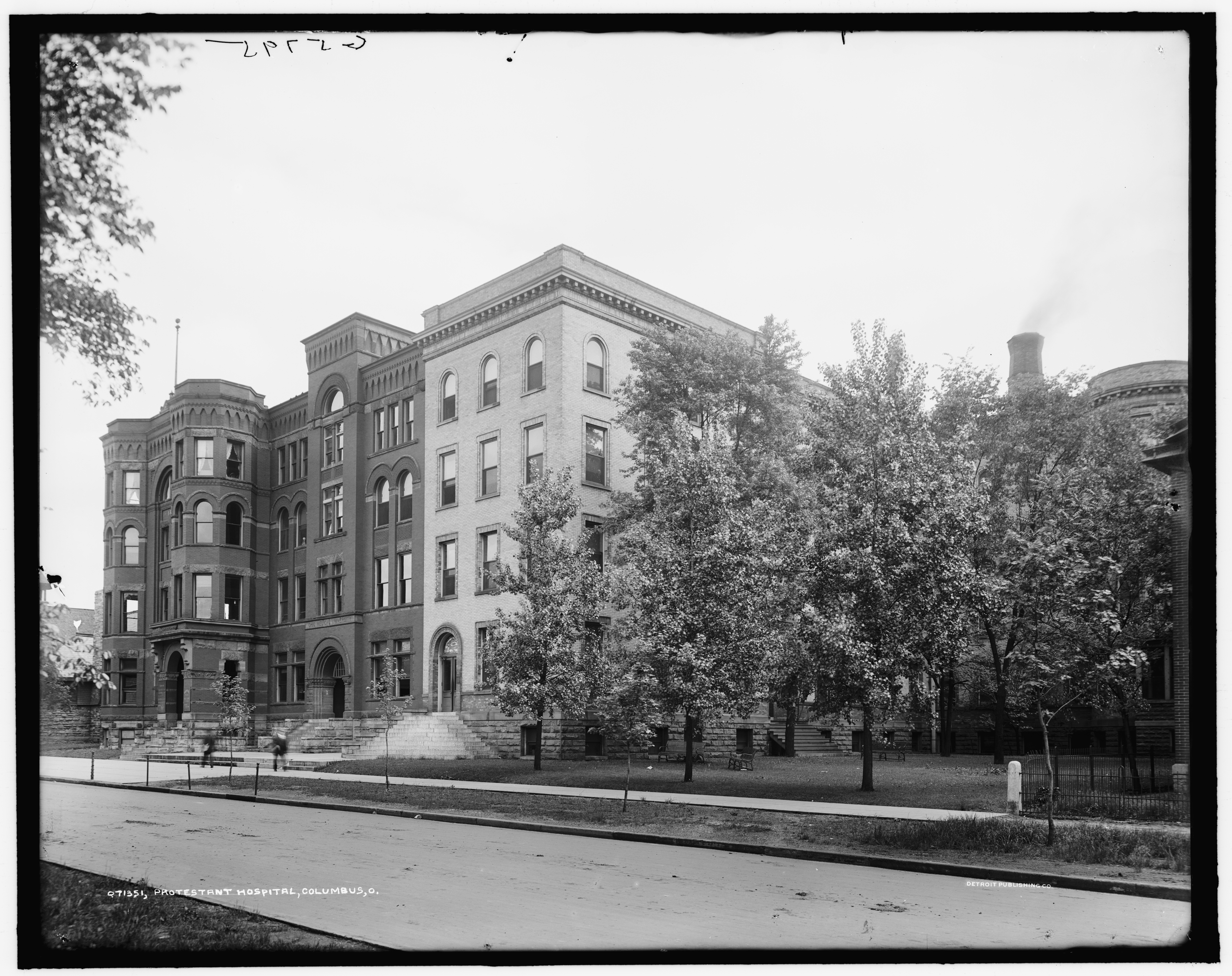
White Cross Hospital

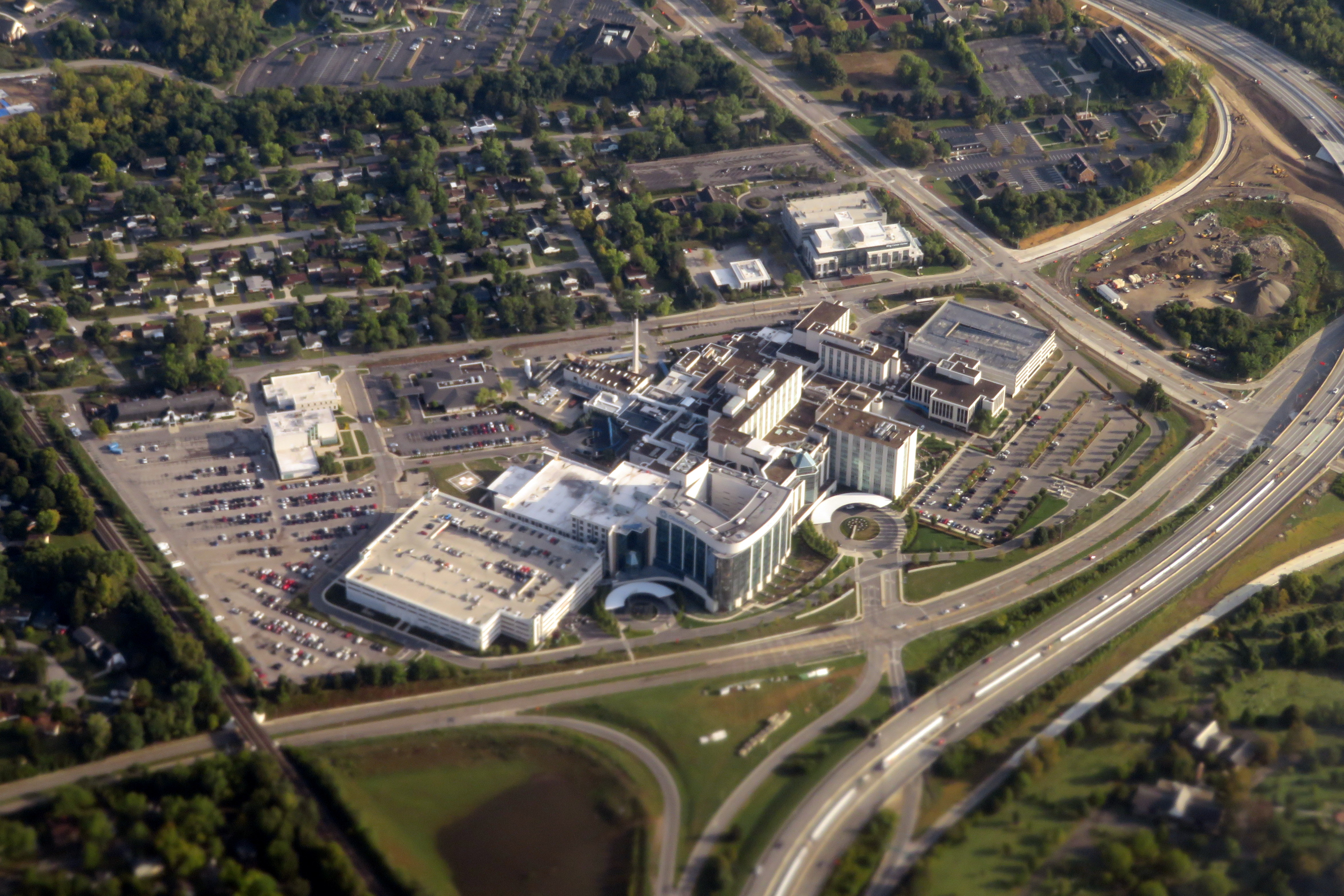
Aerial view of the hospital in 2019

The hospital was founded on June 2, 1892, as the Protestant Hospital. Located in a 15-room house on Dennison Avenue, Columbus, the Hospital could accommodate up to 40 patients. In 1898 the hospital relocated to a larger premises at 700 North Park Street. In 1922, the hospital joined the Ohio Methodist Episcopal Conference and was renamed the White Cross Hospital.

Between 1974 and 1976, in the Columbus radiotherapy accident, 426 patients received "significant" overdoses of radiation from a cobalt-60 external beam radiotherapy unit while receiving treatment for cancers.

Riverside Methodist Hospital has been named to Truven Health Analytics Top 100 Hospitals, and is one of six Hospitals to receive this award on at least ten occasions.

== Services and clinical programs ==
=== Neurosciences ===
The neurological and spine treatment programs at Riverside Methodist Hospital are among the largest in the United States. The programs feature innovative treatments for traumatic brain injury and stroke. The facility holds Comprehensive Stroke Center certification from The Joint Commission. Through the use of minimally invasive treatments, such as MERCI Retriever and Penumbra, the critical time window for treating stroke patients is extended, creating opportunities to improve patient outcomes.

In addition, Riverside Methodist Hospital hosts the largest dedicated Neurointensive care unit in central Ohio.

=== Heart and vascular ===
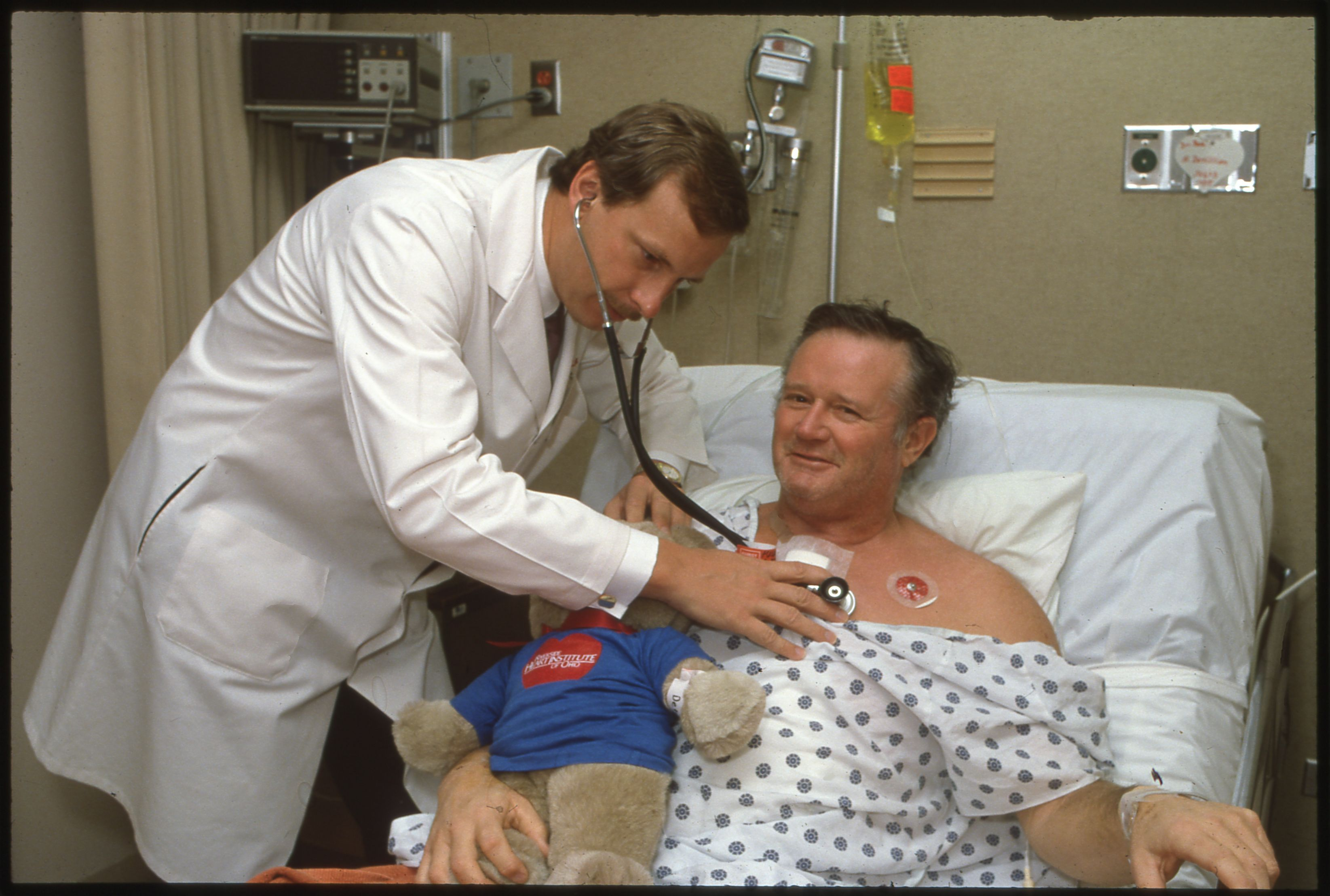
The 1,000th open-heart surgery patient, 1986

Riverside Methodist's Critical Limb Care program is the first of its kind in the United States, providing a complete range of vascular care. The Structural Heart Disease Patient Evaluation and Research Center provides evaluations and treatment for patients with valvular heart disease and other structural heart defects. Facilitated by the OhioHealth Research and Innovation Institute, the center has participated in clinical trials of Medtronic's Core Valve System.

=== Cancer care ===
Riverside Methodist provides advanced cancer care and treatment, including Tomotherapy, radiation therapy, and the minimally invasive Da Vinci robotic surgical system (used to treat prostate issues, fibroids, gynecological cancers, and lung resections).

The Riverside Cancer Care team completes more than 100,000 outpatient, imaging, and surgical procedures for cancer patients each year. Riverside Cancer Care has received Disease-Specific Certification from The Joint Commission on Accreditation of Healthcare Organizations (JCAHO), and the American College of Surgeons Commission on Cancer.

=== Orthopedics ===
Riverside Methodist's total joint program includes specialized treatment and care for patients with a range of bone, muscle, and joint disorders or injuries. The Joint Commission has certified Riverside Methodist in joint replacement in the areas of hip, knee, and total shoulder.

=== Maternity care ===
Riverside Methodist Hospital has one of Ohio's largest maternity programs, which is recognized by the Ohio Department of Health as a Level III Maternity Center. Board-certified obstetricians and neonatologists in this department specialize in the care of patients with high-risk pregnancies, and their babies.
