= OhioHealth Grant Medical Center =

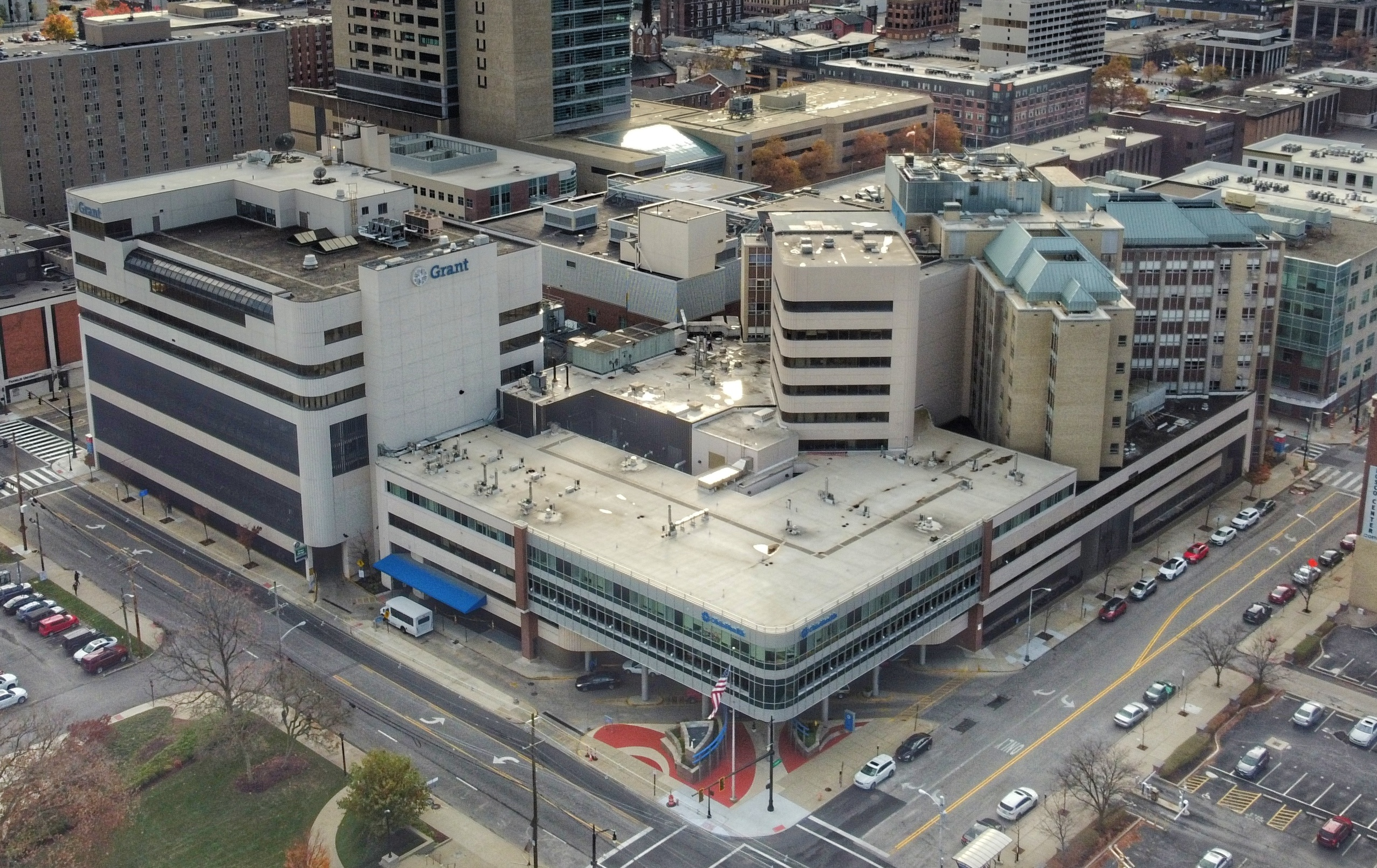

Geography
- Location: 111 South Grant Avenue, Columbus, Ohio, United States
- Coordinates: 39°57′38″N 82°59′29″W

Services
- Emergency department: Level I trauma center
- Beds: 434

Helipads
- Helipad: FAA LID: OH01

Links
- Website: Official website
- Lists: Hospitals in the United States

OhioHealth Grant Medical Center is a hospital in Downtown Columbus, Ohio. The facility was established in 1900 as the second member hospital of OhioHealth, a not-for-profit, faith-based healthcare system. Grant Medical Center is a Level I Trauma Center.

U.S. News & World Report regionally ranked Grant Medical Center #16 in Ohio and nearly at the level of nationally ranked U.S. News Best Hospitals in 3 adult specialties. OhioHealth Grant Medical Center is also recognized as a teaching hospital.

The hospital replaced St. Francis Hospital, also known as Starling Medical College. The hospital was designed by R. A. Sheldon of New York, with assistance from George Bellows Sr. Grant Medical Center operated a 16-story building, Baldwin Tower, from 1968 to its demolition in 2004.

== Services and clinical programs ==
=== Trauma care ===
Grant Medical Center has a Level I Trauma Center in Columbus having been verified as such in 1993.

=== Surgery ===
Grant Medical Center performed 8,110 annual inpatient and 12,617 outpatient surgeries according to U.S. News & World Report. Grant Medical Center is also a teaching hospital offering Surgical Critical Care Fellowships.

=== Neurosciences ===
Grant Medical Center is certified by The Joint Commission as a Primary Stroke Center.

Grant Medical Center received the American Stroke Association award Get with the Guidelines® Achievement Award in 2014 and 2016

=== Orthopedics ===
Grant Medical Center is an accredited hospital from The Joint Commission, and has been since 2010. The Joint Commission Quality Check specifically recognizes Grant Medical Center for its ability in Joint Replacement - Shoulder, Joint Replacement - Knee, Joint Replacement - Hip, and Hip Fracture treatments.

== History ==
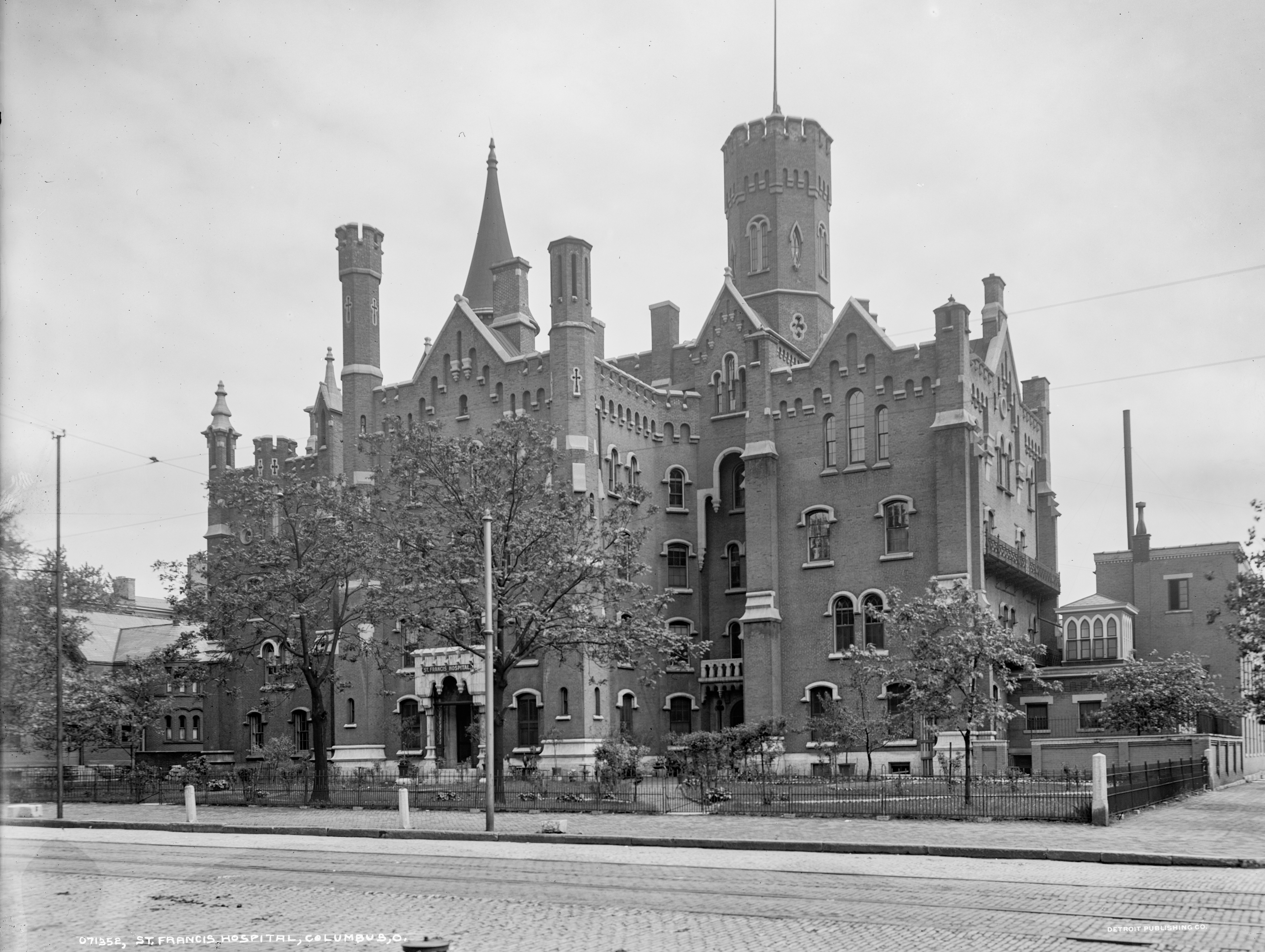
St. Francis Hospital, first hospital on the site

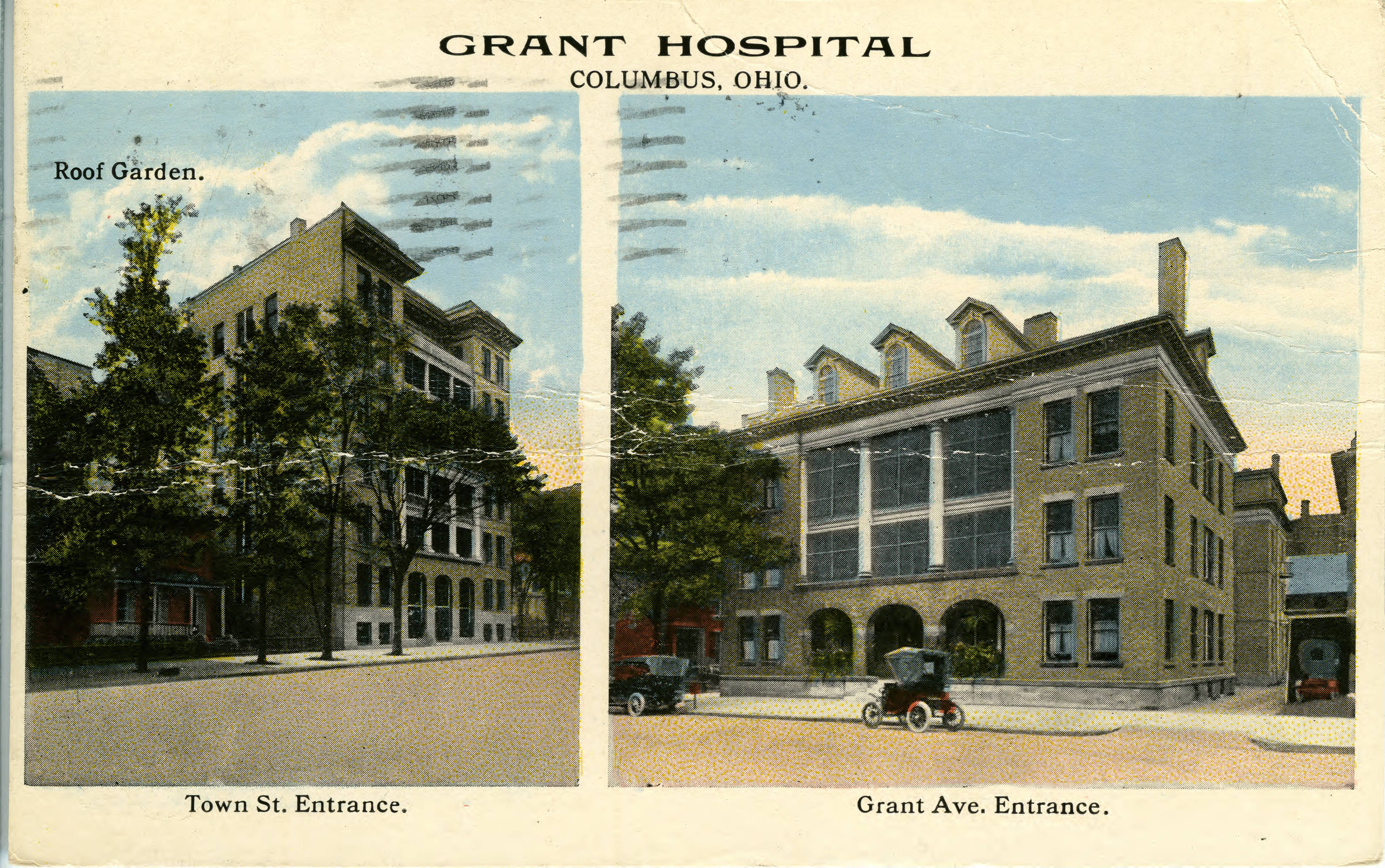
Grant Hospital buildings, demolished

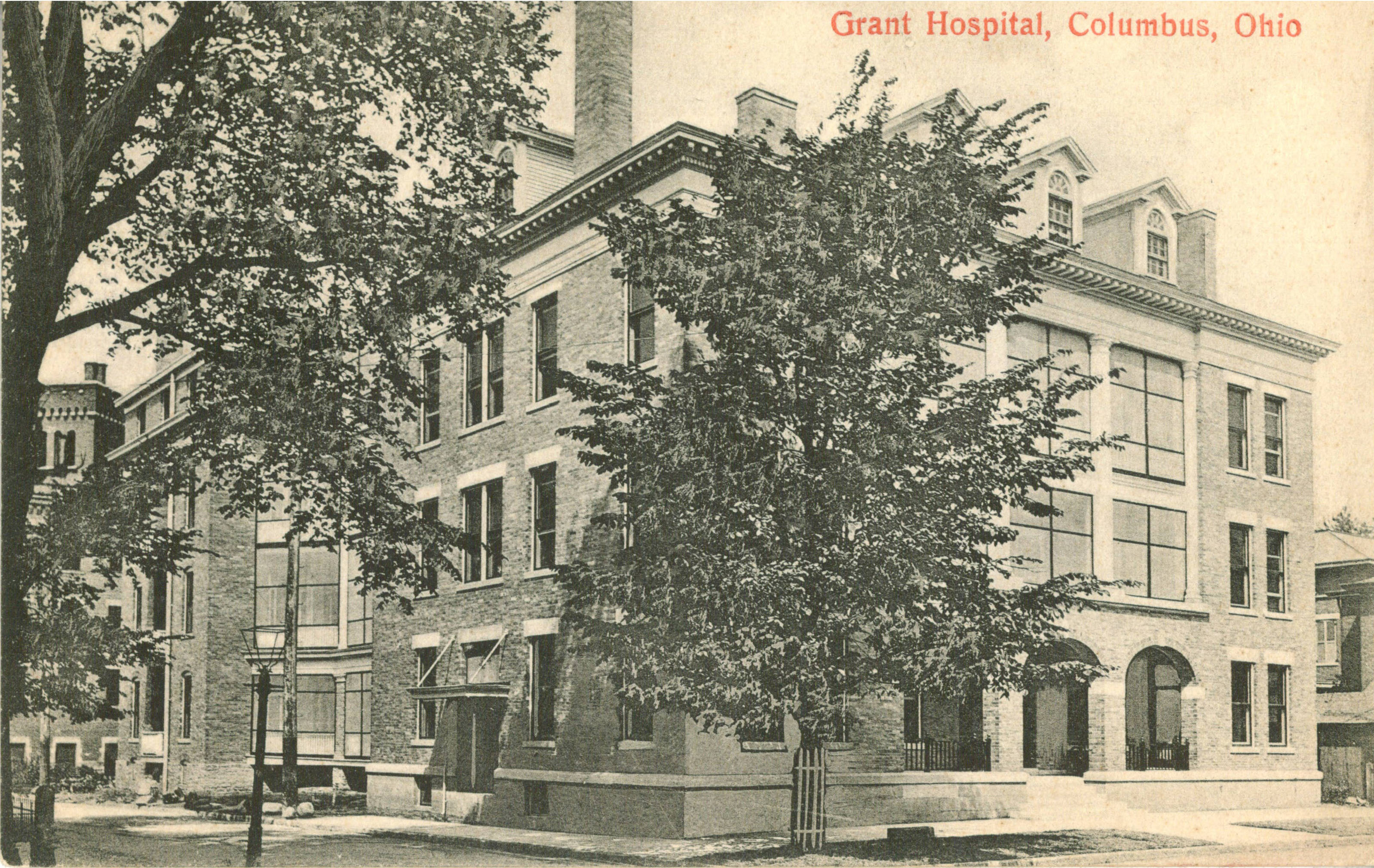
Grant Hospital building, demolished

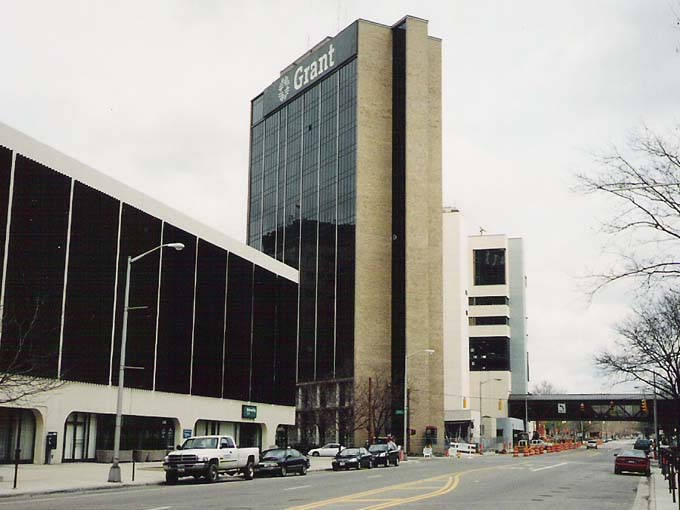
Baldwin Tower, demolished
