= Mason Andrews =

American politician and physician

165th Mayor of Norfolk, Virginia
- In office July 9, 1992 – June 30, 1994
- Preceded by: Joseph Leafe
- Succeeded by: Paul D. Fraim

Personal details
- Born: April 19, 1919 Norfolk, Virginia, US
- Died: October 13, 2006 (aged 87) Norfolk, Virginia, US
- Education: Princeton University; Johns Hopkins University

Mason Cooke Andrews (April 19, 1919 – October 13, 2006) was a Virginia politician and physician, known for delivering America's first in vitro baby. A president of the American Gynecological and Obstetrical Society, Andrews also served on the Norfolk City Council for 26 years and was mayor from 1992-1994.

== America's first "test tube baby" ==
Andrews had attended the birth of about 5,000 babies in Norfolk before delivering Elizabeth Carr by Caesarian section on December 28, 1981, at the Eastern Virginia Medical School (EVMS), which he had played a leading role in creating just a few years earlier. Carr was America's first "test tube baby", and the world's 15th. The first was Louise Brown in 1978 in the UK

Writing at the time of Andrews' death, Patricia Sullivan of The Washington Post observed that "[t]he birth of the first U.S. 'test-tube baby' gave hope to hundreds of thousands of U.S. women who were unable to become pregnant. Carr was the first of about 330,000 babies who have since been born through in vitro fertilization in the United States, according to the American Society of Reproductive Medicine."

== Creation of a medical school ==
Andrews' community service began during the 1950s as a member of the Norfolk Chamber of Commerce and the Health Welfare and Recreation Planning Council. While serving as president of the Norfolk County Medical Society, Andrews appointed a bipartisan committee to study the need for a medical school in the area. The study was able to convince the Virginia General Assembly of the need for a new medical school.

In 1964, the Eastern Virginia Medical Center Authority was formed with the charge of developing the new medical school. Andrews served as the chairman of the authority from 1964-1970. Speaking in 2006, EVMS President Harry T. Lester stated that "Dr. Andrews is rightfully seen as the prime mover behind EVMS."

Under Andrews' leadership, a medical center complex was built in an area that had once been slums. The medical complex now consists of the EVMS campus, Norfolk General Hospital, the Medical Tower, the Norfolk Public Health Department, Children's Hospital of the King's Daughters and the Tidewater Rehabilitation Institute.

In addition, as chairman of the Department of Obstetrics and Gynecology at EVMS, Andrews was instrumental in bringing the team of Drs. Howard and Georgeanna Jones to Norfolk. The Drs. Jones specialized in treating infertility problems. In 1981, they brought international attention to Norfolk with the role they played in Elizabeth Carr's birth. With the success of the in-vitro fertilization program, the Jones Institute for Reproductive Medicine was founded in 1983.

== Norfolk visionary ==
During his tenure on the city council (1974-2000), Andrews was instrumental in the redevelopment of the downtown waterfront. Andrews introduced the developer of the Baltimore Inner Harbor, James Rouse, to Norfolk. Rouse designed the Waterside Festival Marketplace for the Norfolk waterfront. City officials largely credit Andrews for the opening of Waterside as well as Town Point Park and Nauticus on the waterfront and for the city's bold decision to spend tens of millions of dollars to open the $300 million MacArthur Center mall. MacArthur Center, considered a risky investment, has generated millions of dollars in direct tax revenue to the city above and beyond its debt service and has become a catalyst for development of Norfolk's historic retail center along Granby Street.

Other downtown projects promoted by Andrews included the Norfolk campus of Tidewater Community College.

"In many ways, he was the architect of downtown as we now know it," said Cathy Coleman, of the Downtown Norfolk Council. Quoted by The Virginian-Pilot in 2006, Coleman remarked that "(Andrews') imprint is everywhere, from the waterfront to Main Street to Tidewater Community College to the medical center to the streetscapes – it just goes on and on."

Andrews promoted a downtown development strategy that combined meticulous planning with millions of dollars of city money to lure private investment. Once the region's retail core, downtown had been decimated by suburban shopping malls. Waterfront property was considered so cheap that it was used for parking. Andrews championed downtown Norfolk as the Hampton Roads region's business and entertainment center. The waterfront, he said, should become the focal point of downtown life. By the time of his death, what was once regarded as his farfetched vision had been realized.

== Education and family ==
Andrews graduated from Maury High School, and later received his bachelor's degree in chemistry from Princeton University in 1940 and his M.D. from Johns Hopkins University in 1943 where he completed his residency as well. Andrews taught Obstetrics and Gynecology at Johns Hopkins and later at EVMS.

Andrews began a successful OB/GYN private practice in Norfolk in 1950.

Andrews was married to Sabine Alston Goodman Andrews for 57 years. They had two daughters, Jean and Mason.

Elizabeth Carr would grow up to become a newspaper reporter in Augusta, Maine and later worked for boston.com. "The running joke in my family was that Mason, whom we called Mace the Ace, had the plans for Waterside at the same time I was about to be born," she said. "My parents always said we were Mace's two babies."

She said Andrews made a point of staying in touch with her, always called her on holidays and sent her a wedding gift.

"I grew up on Mason's lap," she said. "Every time we got together, he would make a point to take my family out to dinner and would always make sure I was keeping my grades up."
