= McCammon =

McCammon is a surname. Notable people with the surname include:

- Bob McCammon (born 1941), Canadian ice hockey player
- Catherine McCammon, American geologist
- J. Andrew McCammon (born 1947), American chemist and academic
- John McCammon, Irish bicycle inventor
- Kurt A. McCammon, American urologist
- Mark McCammon (born 1978), English-born Barbadian footballer
- Mary McCammon (circa 1928 – 2008), British mathematician
- Morgan McCammon (1922-1999), Canadian lawyer and businessman
- Robert R. McCammon (born 1952), American novelist
- William W. McCammon (1838-1903), American Civil War Union Army officer

== See also ==
- McCammon, Idaho, city in Idaho, United States
- Samuel McCammon House, historic home in Knoxville, Tennessee
