= Sentara Norfolk General Hospital =

- Sentara Healthcare
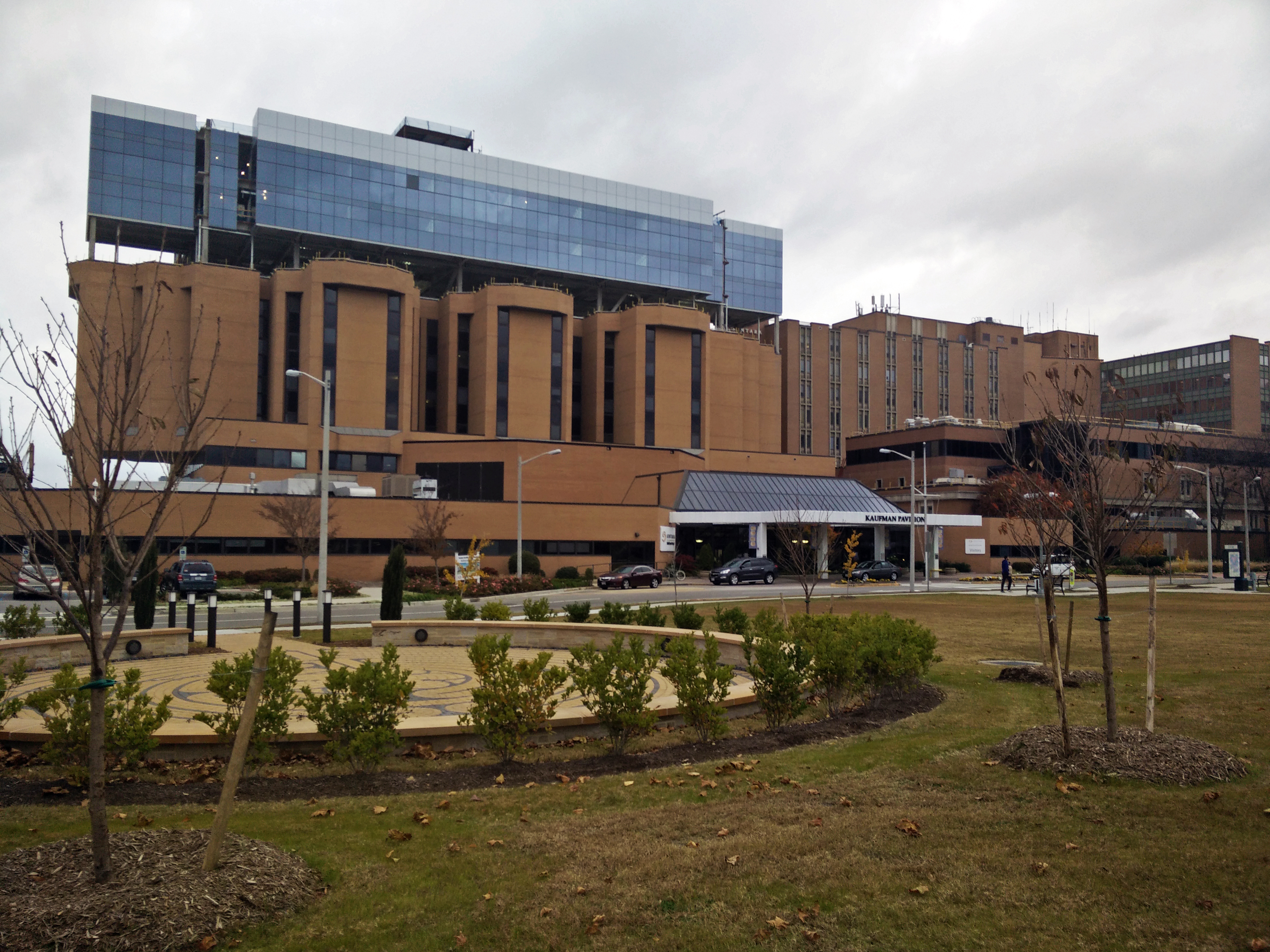
- Norfolk General undergoing expansion

Geography
- Location: 600 Gresham Drive, Norfolk, Virginia, United States
- Coordinates: 36°51′40.53″N 76°18′12.78″W

Organization
- Care system: Sentara
- Type: Teaching
- Affiliated university: Eastern Virginia Medical School

Services
- Emergency department: Level I trauma center
- Beds: 563

History
- Founded: 1888

Links
- Website: Norfolk General
- Lists: Hospitals in Virginia

Sentara Norfolk General Hospital (SNGH) is a large academic hospital, which serves as the primary teaching institution for the adjacent Eastern Virginia Medical School. Located in Norfolk, Virginia, in the Ghent neighborhood and adjacent to Downtown, the hospital serves as the Hampton Roads region's only Level I trauma center. The hospital is interconnected to the Sentara Heart Hospital; however, it is considered a separate institution. Together with the adjacent Children's Hospital of the King's Daughters, Eastern Virginia Medical School and the Norfolk Department of Health, the Eastern Virginia Medical Center is the largest conglomerate center for health in Hampton Roads. For a time, the U.S. News & World Report rated it the best in Virginia. In 2016, SNGH is tied with VCU Medical Center ranked as #2 while University of Virginia Health System ranked first.

== History ==
In 1888 the forerunner to Norfolk General, the 25-bed Retreat for the Sick, was opened in downtown Norfolk. At this time there were fewer than 200 hospitals in the entire country. In 1892 the Retreat for the Sick opened the first nursing school in Norfolk. The hospital moved to a new location in 1896 and was renamed Norfolk Protestant Hospital in 1898. The hospital moved again in 1903 and witnessed a fire in 1906, though there were no deaths. Norfolk Protestant was renamed Norfolk General in the 1930s and the first open-heart surgery in Virginia was performed there in 1967.

In 1981 Elizabeth Carr was born at the hospital, becoming America's first in-vitro fertilization baby. The first heart transplant performed in Hampton Roads occurred at the hospital in 1989.

After medical school at Harvard Medical School and training in general surgery and critical care, Suffolk native, Dr. L.D. Britt returned to Hampton Roads and built a well–respected general surgery program and established Norfolk General Hospital as Hampton Roads' only Level 1 trauma center.

== Ranking ==
In 2016, the hospital is nationally ranked in two specialties by U.S. News & World Report.

- Cardiology and Heart Surgery #24
- Diabetes and Endocrinology #24
