= Howard P. Kern =

American healthcare executive

- Education: MHA
- Alma mater: Binghamton University; Medical College of Virginia
- Occupation: Healthcare executive
- Known for: CEO of Sentara Healthcare

Howard P. Kern is an American healthcare executive who is the former president and CEO Emeritus of Sentara Healthcare, a not-for-profit integrated health system headquartered in Norfolk, Virginia. He has held the positions since March 2016. Kern has been with Sentara in one position or another since 1980. Before his appointment to CEO, he was the President and COO of the organization.

Kern earned his undergraduate degree at the Binghamton University before completing his Master of Health Administration at the Medical College of Virginia in 1981. He began working at Sentara as an administrative resident in 1980. In 1986, he was named the senior vice president and COO of Sentara Norfolk General Hospital. In 1990, he became the hospital's executive vice president. In 1995, he was appointed senior vice president of the healthcare system, and, three years later, he was named the executive vice president and COO of Sentara Healthcare.

In addition to his work with Sentara, Kern is a member of the faculty at the Medical College of Virginia and serves on numerous community, corporate, and academic boards. He was recognized as one of Modern Healthcare's 100 Most Influential People in Healthcare and as one of the 50 Most Influential Virginians by Virginia Business.
