= Ghent (Norfolk) =

- Ghent Historic District
- U.S. National Register of Historic Places
- U.S. Historic district
- Virginia Landmarks Register
- Location within Virginia Location within the United States
- Location: Roughly bounded by Olney Rd., Virginia Beach Blvd., Smith's Creek, and Brambleton Ave., Norfolk, Virginia
- Coordinates: 36°51′45.6″N 76°18′2.9″W
- Area: 77 acres (31 ha)
- Architectural style: Colonial Revival, Tudor Revival, Queen Anne
- NRHP reference No.: 80004455
- VLR No.: 122-0061

Significant dates
- Added to NRHP: July 4, 1980
- Designated VLR: June 19, 1979

The Ghent District is a historic neighborhood in Norfolk, Virginia. It comprises Ghent, West Ghent, and Ghent Square. Other portions of surrounding neighborhoods are often attributed to Ghent as an extension of its commerce including Chelsea, North Colley Avenue, and active gentrification into portions of Park Place to the north, labelled 'The Railroad District'.

Ghent's boundaries to the south are Mowbray Arch/Brambleton Avenue along The Hague and the Neon District, the Elizabeth River to the west, Monticello Avenue on the east, and the railroad crossing at 22nd Street to the North.

== History ==
A commonly referenced story claims that around 1810 a man named J. Moran became the owner of a swath of land along the Elizabeth River. By some accounts, Mr. Moran became inspired by the conclusion of the War of 1812 and James Madison's ratification of the Treaty of Ghent that ended the conflict, and decided to name his estate "Ghent" in honor of the peace treaty. Another widely accepted story claims that in the 1830s a Norfolk resident, Commodore Richard Drummond, purchased the farmland south of the city from Mr. Moran, however, it was not yet named. Drummond purportedly owned the ship on which the Treaty of Ghent was transported back to America. Proud of this honor, Drummond is said to have built his new home on the land he had purchased and named it "Ghent" to commemorate the occasion. The first of the homes to make up the neighborhood were built along this portion of the river known as Smith's Creek. The street "Drummond Place" in Ghent bears his name.

Two Dutchmen are responsible for transforming that farmland into the streets of Ghent we have today. J. P. Andre Mottu immigrated to America from The Netherlands in 1890. He worked for the Norfolk Company, partially owned by Adolphe Boissevain, a visionary and investor in American railroads and real estate. At this time the land on which Drummond built his home was connected to Norfolk only by a single pedestrian bridge. Mottu and Boissevain, attracted by the waterfront, envisioned the area modeled after their home in The Netherlands, and so renamed Smith's Creek after The Hague in South Holland, as for the neighborhood, the name Ghent would stick. Marshlands in this area were filled and the shoreline given a semicircular shape to mimic the canals of their Dutch homeland. Mottu and Boissevain's plan for Ghent successfully exploited the area's strategic waterfront location, providing views over the creek to the grass banks on the opposite shore. The resulting street, Mowbray Arch, soon became the favored location for the stately houses of Norfolk's middle and upper-middle-class residents. Development was rapid over the next decade, and spread to encompass over thirty blocks, most of what is now considered Historic Ghent.

The Ghent Historic District is a national historic district listed on the National Register of Historic Places since 1980. It encompasses 184 contributing buildings and one contributing site in a primarily residential section of the neighborhood. Numerous residences in the area are principal examples of Queen Anne revival, Colonial Revival, and Tudor Revival style homes. Notable buildings include the Warren (c. 1925), the Holland (1904), the Mowbray (c. 1914), Eastern Virginia Medical School, Sentara Norfolk General Hospital (1902), Fergus Reid residence (1892), the Frank S. Royster residence (c. 1900-02), the William H. White residence (c. 1892), the Richard B. Tunstall residence (c. 1892), the Robert M. and Robert W. Hughes residence (c. 1895-1900), and the William Tait residence (c. 1895).

The neighborhood went into steep decline in the years following World War II as a result of white flight and urban blight. Upper and middle class families flocked from the city to suburbia for reasons mostly associated with racial self-segregation. During this time, much of the neighborhood fell into disrepair; blight became so severe that portions of Ghent were referred to as slums by then Mayor of Norfolk, Pretlow Darden. As of today only a few of the areas' original public buildings remain with the notable exceptions of Maury High School and the Van Wyck branch of the Norfolk Public Library due to extensive urban renewal programs that followed a raze and rebuild tactic as a part of Franklin D. Roosevelt's broader New Deal ideology. Norfolk secured its first grant for urban renewal in 1949; renewal was extensively focused on preservation of the Ghent neighborhood. Under these programs, as well as implementation of numerous housing codes over the course of two decades the neighborhood had been successful in its gentrification and revitalization efforts by the mid-1970s. Gentrification continues to spread out northward and eastward from Ghent proper to this day.

== Facilities ==
=== Parks and Recreation ===
- Portions of the Elizabeth River Trail run through the Ghent collective
- Ghent Dog Park is located in the portion of the neighborhood known as Stockley Gardens
- Raleigh Avenue Playground
- Fergus Reid Tennis Park

=== Arts ===
Located in Ghent's commercial district is Naro Theater, opened on February 24, 1936 as The Colley Theater. Today the theater screens foreign and independent films. The Naro Theater is also the stage for a recurring Rocky Horror Picture Show shadow cast, purportedly one of the longest-running in the country, at over 30 years of consistent monthly productions. Also within Ghent's commercial district are multiple independent art galleries displaying and selling local artists' works.

Norfolk's major art museum is the Chrysler Museum of Art. The museum features more than 50 galleries, a restaurant and catering facilities.

Across from the Chrysler Museum is Virginia Opera's home stage, the Harrison Opera House.

Ghent celebrates several cultural and art festivals which include Ghent Pride Festival each June, and the annual St. Patrick’s Day street festival. The Bi-annual Stockley Gardens Arts Festival operates in the spring and fall.

=== Culinary ===
On Monticello Avenue, Doumar's Cones and BBQ famously created the ice cream cone, and the world's first waffle ice cream cone machine. They have been selling them in the same location since 1934.

=== Healthcare ===
The neighborhood hosts Hampton Road's largest medical complex, and only Level 1 trauma center, containing Sentara Norfolk General Hospital, Sentara Heart Hospital, Children's Hospital of the King's Daughters, and Eastern Virginia Medical School. The first open-heart surgery in Virginia was performed at Sentara Norfolk General Hospital in 1967, and the first baby in the United States conceived by in vitro fertilization, was born there in 1981.

== Flooding ==
Due to its low elevation and vulnerability to coastal storms, the Norfolk area is at risk of rising sea levels.
