= McCammond =

McCammond is a surname. Notable people with the surname include:

- Alexi McCammond (born 1993), American political journalist
- William McCammond (died 1898), 19th century Irish politician

== See also ==
- McCammon
