= Sentara Martha Jefferson Hospital =

Hospital in Virginia, US

- Sentara Healthcare
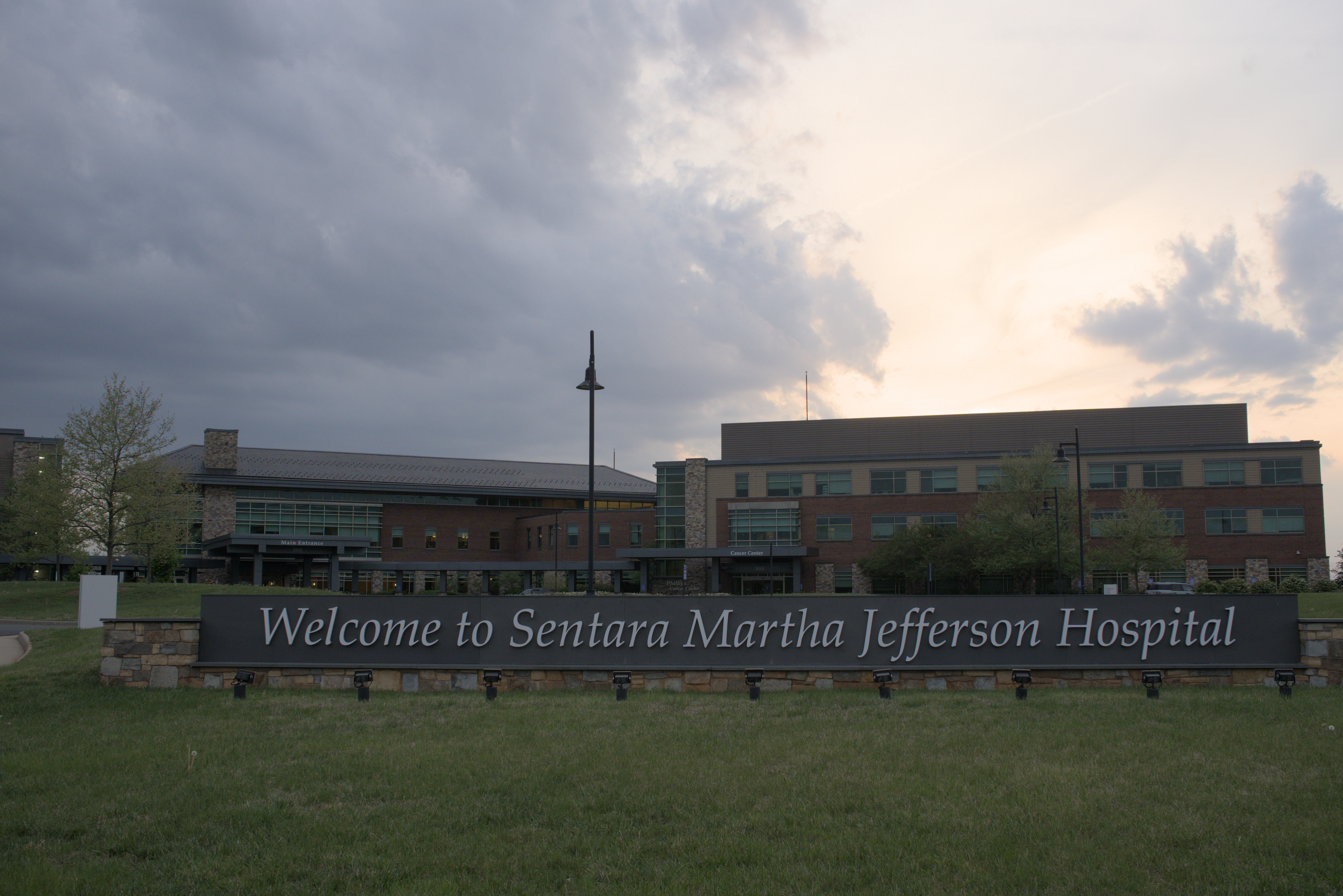

Geography
- Location: Charlottesville, Virginia, United States
- Coordinates: 38°1′56.5″N 78°28′19.4″W

Organization
- Type: General

Services
- Beds: 176

History
- Opened: 1903

Links
- Website: www.sentara.com/hospitalslocations/martha-jefferson-hospital
- Lists: Hospitals in Virginia

Martha Jefferson Hospital is a nonprofit community hospital owned by Sentara Healthcare and located in Charlottesville, Virginia. It was founded in 1903 by eight local physicians. The 176-bed hospital has an employed staff of 1,600 and has 365 affiliated physicians.

The hospital owns 10 primary care and three specialty practices. Major services include a Cancer Care Center, Digestive Care Center, Cardiology Care Center, Orthopedics including Spine Surgery & Joint Replacement Surgery, Bariatric (Weight Loss) Surgery, Neurosciences including Neurosurgery and a Sleep Medicine Center, Stroke Care Center, Thoracic Surgery, Vascular Medicine & Surgery, and a Women's Health Center.

== Relocation ==
Over the years, the hospital expanded at its downtown-Charlottesville location on Locust Avenue. However, in the early 2000s, it was clear a new facility needed to be built to accommodate a growing number of patients and the ability to expand further in a more open area. The hospital chose an 84-acre (34 ha) campus adjacent to their current Outpatient Care Center on Pantops Mountain for the new facility.

=== Design and construction ===
The new building is designed by Kahler Slater of Milwaukee, WI. Engineering firms include Graef, Anhult, Schloemer & Associates of Milwaukee; Ring & DuChateau of Milwaukee; Rummel, Klepper & Kahi LLP of Richmond, VA and Hughes, Good, O'Leary and Ryan of Atlanta, GA. The general contractor was M. A. Mortenson Company of Brookfield, Wisconsin.

The new building has five floors and a basement. There are two wings for patient rooms, the Wendel Wing and the Cornell Wing, as well as a cancer wing, the Phillips Family Cancer Center. The emergency department is located on the southwest end of the second floor. The maternity ward is located in the central area of the third floor. Visitor access, as well as retail space, is located on the Northeast side of the third floor. The cafeteria is located on the northeast side of the fourth floor.

=== Sale of the old facility ===
In September 2010, Martha Jefferson Hospital sold its downtown Charlottesville building to Octagon Partners. Octagon Partners later announced that the CFA Institute would move into a portion of the re-developed facility in 2013.

== Merger ==
On September 29, 2010, Martha Jefferson Hospital announced its intention to merge with Sentara Healthcare. The merger was finalized on June 1, 2011, making Martha Jefferson the tenth hospital of Sentara Healthcare's not-for-profit integrated health system, which is based in Norfolk, Virginia.
