= Elizabeth Jordan Carr =

First American born by IVF (born 1981)

Elizabeth Carr
- Born: December 28, 1981 (age 44); Norfolk, Virginia, U.S.
- Other name: Elizabeth Jordan Comeau
- Education: Simmons University (BA)
- Occupation: Journalist
- Known for: First IVF birth in the U.S.

Elizabeth Jordan Carr (born December 28, 1981) is the United States' first baby born from the in-vitro fertilization procedure and the 15th in the world. The technique was conducted at Eastern Virginia Medical School in Norfolk under the direction of Doctors Howard Jones and Georgeanna Seegar Jones, who were the first to attempt the process in the United States. She was delivered at Norfolk General Hospital in Virginia by Dr. Mason Andrews weighing 5 pounds 12 ounces (about 2600 grams).

The parents of Carr were Judith Carr, a 28-year-old schoolteacher at the time, and her husband, Roger Carr, 30, of Westminster, Massachusetts. Elizabeth's mother was able to get pregnant, but couldn't continue. She experienced three ectopic pregnancies, fertilized eggs growing outside the womb, each ending in a miscarriage, and the doctor was eventually forced to remove her fallopian tubes.

Carr attended Simmons College in Boston, Massachusetts,

On August 5, 2010, Carr gave birth to her first child, Trevor James Comeau. He was conceived without the assistance of artificial reproductive technology.

In March of 2024, Carr was invited by U.S. Senator Tim Kaine to attend the 2024 State of the Union Address given by President Joe Biden following the suspension of IVF services in Alabama due to LePage v. Center for Reproductive Medicine.

== See also ==
- Louise Brown
