= Howard W. Jones =

American physician (1910–2015)

- Jones in a 2010 interview
- Born: Howard Wilbur Jones, Jr. December 30, 1910; Baltimore, Maryland, U.S.
- Died: July 31, 2015 (aged 104); Norfolk, Virginia, U.S.
- Education: Johns Hopkins School of Medicine
- Medical career
- Profession: Medicine
- Institutions: Johns Hopkins School of Medicine; Eastern Virginia Medical School
- Sub-specialties: In vitro fertilization

Howard Wilbur Jones, Jr. (December 30, 1910 – July 31, 2015) was an American gynecological surgeon and in vitro fertilization (IVF) specialist. Jones and his wife, Georgeanna Seegar Jones, were two of the earliest reproductive medicine specialists in the United States. They established the reproductive medicine center that was responsible for the birth of the first IVF baby in the U.S. He wrote articles on the beginning of human personhood and testified before legislators on the same subject. He was one of the early physicians to perform sex reassignment surgeries.

Jones was on the faculty at Johns Hopkins School of Medicine from the 1940s until his mandatory retirement from the institution in 1978. He and his wife moved to Virginia and were affiliated with Eastern Virginia Medical School (EVMS). Jones retired in the 1990s, but he continued to write and spent time at EVMS until shortly before his death.

== Early life ==
Jones was born in Baltimore to Howard Wilbur Jones, Sr. and Edith Ruth Marling Jones on December 30, 1910. Even though he lived in the city, Jones was educated for a few years in a rural public school to avoid the city public school system. When Jones was a child, he went on house calls and hospital visits with his father, who was a physician. Jones's father died when he was 13 years old. Jones's mother moved him to a private school after the death of his father.

He earned an undergraduate degree from Amherst College in 1931 and a medical degree from Johns Hopkins School of Medicine in 1935. Jones completed a residency in surgery and then joined the U.S. Army during World War II, leading an Auxiliary Surgical Group team in Patton's Third Army. After the war, Jones was invited to complete a second residency in gynecology.

== Career ==
Jones and his wife joined the faculty at Johns Hopkins on a part-time basis in 1948. He was the initial treating physician of Henrietta Lacks when she presented to Johns Hopkins with cancer in 1951. Jones took a biopsy of Lacks's tumor and sent samples to his laboratory colleagues. The cells, later known as HeLa cells, grew at an astonishing rate in the lab and were shipped and sold to researchers for various purposes. Research with the cells helped to facilitate medical breakthroughs, including the vaccines for polio and human papillomavirus, though controversy later arose because the cells were being used without the knowledge of Lacks or her family. Jones's role in the Lacks case was described in the book The Immortal Life of Henrietta Lacks.

In 1960, the Joneses left private practice to join the Johns Hopkins faculty full-time. While there, Howard Jones participated in sex reassignment surgeries. In 1967, when sexual identity specialist John Money recommended sex reassignment for a child named David Reimer, Jones performed the surgery. Reimer, who had suffered a severe penile injury during a circumcision, was 22 months old when Jones removed his testicles, shaped his scrotal tissue to look like labia and repositioned his urethral opening. Money declared the procedure a success. The case became controversial when Milton Diamond published a 1997 follow-up study revealing Reimer experienced gender identity problems and lived as a man in adulthood. Reimer ultimately committed suicide at the age of 38.

In the 1960s, he was able to participate in experiments involving sperm and oocytes with Robert Edwards, the doctor whose work later created the world's first test tube baby. In 1978, Jones faced mandatory retirement from Johns Hopkins. The Joneses moved to Virginia and established the Jones Institute for Reproductive Medicine at the Eastern Virginia Medical School (EVMS). They created an in vitro fertilization (IVF) program at EVMS, which resulted in the 1981 birth of Elizabeth Jordan Carr, the first test tube baby in the country. Before his first successful IVF treatment, the clinic experienced 41 failed attempts at IVF.

After his wife developed Alzheimer's disease in the late 1990s, Jones officially retired from his institute so that he could care for her. However, as of 2013, Jones still spent a few hours per day at EVMS and was writing his twelfth book. In February 2012, Jones successfully appealed to Virginia legislators to stop a bill that would have declared life to begin at conception. Jones said that the bill would have interfered with medical treatment for infertility.

Jones has been recognized with a Distinguished Service Award from the American Congress of Obstetricians and Gynecologists. He was named a Fellow ad eundem of the Royal College of Obstetricians and Gynaecologists in 1986. Jones and his wife received Distinguished Alumnus Awards from Johns Hopkins University in 1997.

== Personal life ==
In 2011, Jones wrote an article for The Yale Journal for Humanities in Medicine on his keys to a long life. "First, I am the result of a tremendous shuffling of genetic material, which included some 3 billion potential variables. I got lucky. My combination seems to confer longevity," he said. He also wrote that his career and his family life had been enjoyable and rewarding, which had enhanced his longevity.

Jones was married for 64 years before his wife's 2005 death. A son, Howard Jones, III, became the chairman of obstetrics and gynecology at Vanderbilt University Medical Center in 2009. A daughter, Georgeanna Jones Klingensmith, is a pediatric endocrinologist in Denver.

== Death ==
Jones died of respiratory failure on July 31, 2015, at the age of 104. He had been hospitalized at the Sentara Heart Hospital for the two weeks preceding his death.

== Selected publications ==
=== Articles ===
- Jones Howard (2005). "Twenty-Five Years of In Vitro Fertilization: A Look Back and a Look Forward". Obstetrical & Gynecological Survey. 60 (2): 75–6. doi:10.1097/01.ogx.0000153993.45283.e8.
- Jones Howard W.; Toner James P. (1993). "The Infertile Couple". The New England Journal of Medicine. 329 (23): 1710–1715. doi:10.1056/nejm199312023292307. PMID 8166801.

=== Books ===
- Jones, Howard W., Jr. (2015). "Howard & Georgeanna". Williamsburg, VA: Jamestowne Bookworks.
- Jones, Howard W., Jr. (2014). "In Vitro Fertilization Comes to America: Memoir of a Medical Breakthrough". Williamsburg, VA: Jamestowne Bookworks.
- Jones, Howard W., Jr. (2013). Personhood Revisited: Reproductive Technology, Bioethics, Religion and the Law. Minneapolis: Langdon Street Press.
- Crockin, Susan L., and Jones, Howard W., Jr. (2010). Legal Conceptions: The Evolving Law and Policy of Assisted Reproductive Technologies. Baltimore: Johns Hopkins University Press.
