= Sanjay Gulati =

Child psychiatrist

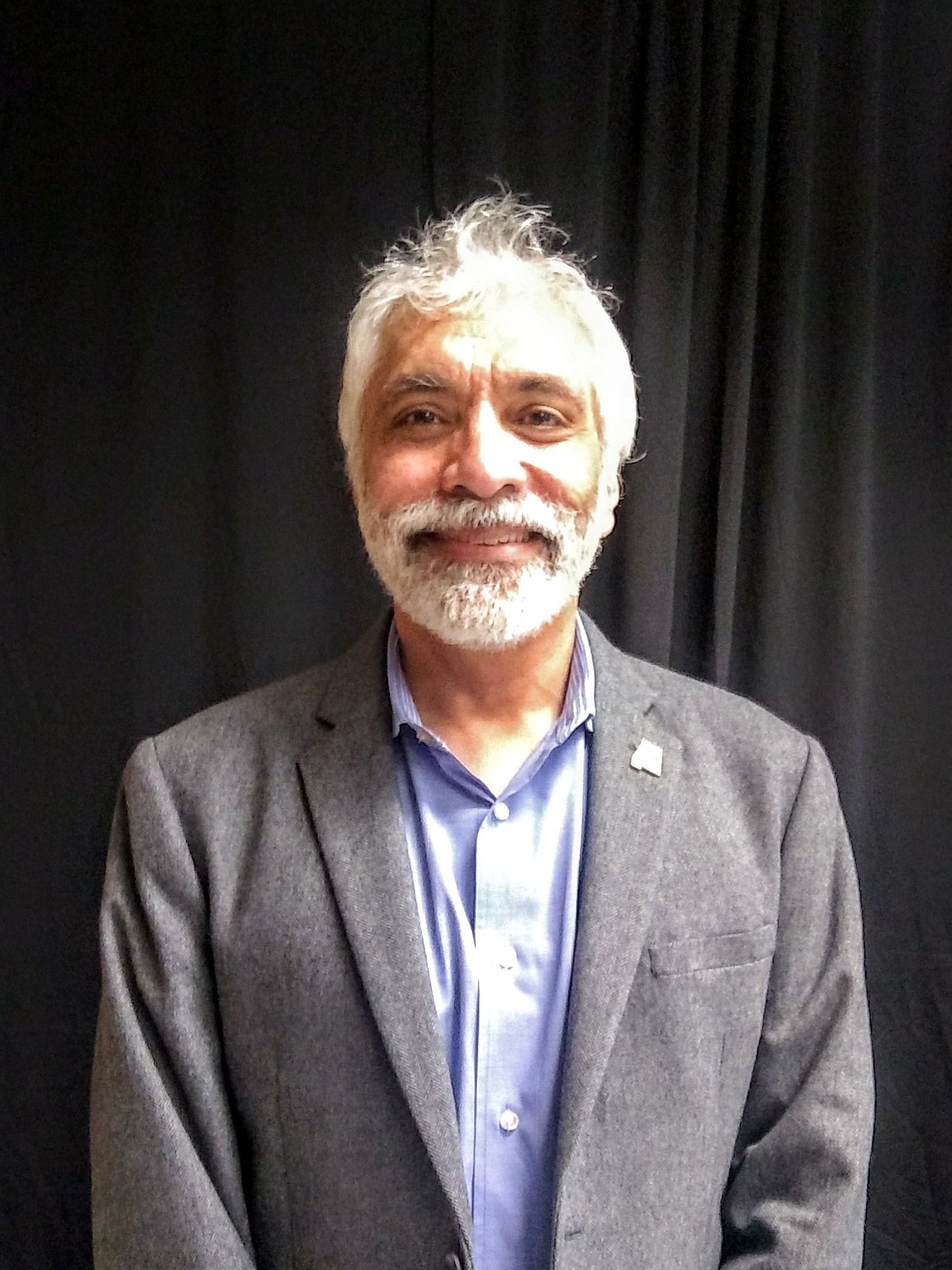
- Born: Nottingham, England
- Education: Eastern Virginia Medical School
- Known for: Expertise of language deprivation
- Notable work: Language Deprivation Syndrome

Sanjay Gulati is a child psychiatrist in Massachusetts whose research revolves around people who are deaf and hard of hearing and whose focus is on educating professionals working with deaf and hard of hearing populations about language deprivation syndrome. He is credited with coining the concept of language deprivation syndrome and studies the constellation of behaviors that result from lacking a foundational first language in deaf children.

== Education ==
Gulati is a graduate of Eastern Virginia Medical School where he finished his residency in psychiatry at Albany Medical College, after completing his residency he then went on to hold a child psychiatry fellowship at Cambridge Hospital.

== Medical Practice ==
Gulati works with his clients on providing guidance around developing social skills, navigating relationships with family and peers and learning to practice self-acceptance. He is bilingual in American Sign Language and English and works with clients who are deaf and hard of hearing. His expertise is in language deprivation syndrome.

== Academic Publications ==
Gulati served as a co-editor for Mental Health Care of Deaf People: A Culturally Affirmative Approach (ISBN 978-1-138-98094-5). This text is for an audience of healthcare professionals as a guide for treating deaf patients. The book focuses on the concept of developing mental health services specifically for deaf people and emphasizing that deaf people are not disabled, but rather a cultural minority. In 2018, Gulati published Language Deprivation and Deaf Mental Health, where he examined the effects of language deprivation on deaf individuals' communication skills, comprehension, and mental health. Gulati often presents research on language deprivation to professionals.

== Achievements and Involvement ==
Gulati is a member of the National Association of the Deaf (NAD) Language Deprivation Taskforce.

== Personal life ==
Gulati was born in Nottingham England to Indian parents who were both medical doctors. His family moved to the United States when Gulati was nine years old. His deafness was progressive and impacted him in high school. He has genetic otosclerosis. Gulati views his deafness not as a disability, but rather as an experience that has benefited his life. This view and experience of personal deafness aligns with the concept of Deaf gain.
