= UVA Children's Hospital =

Children's hospital in Virginia, US

- University of Virginia Health System

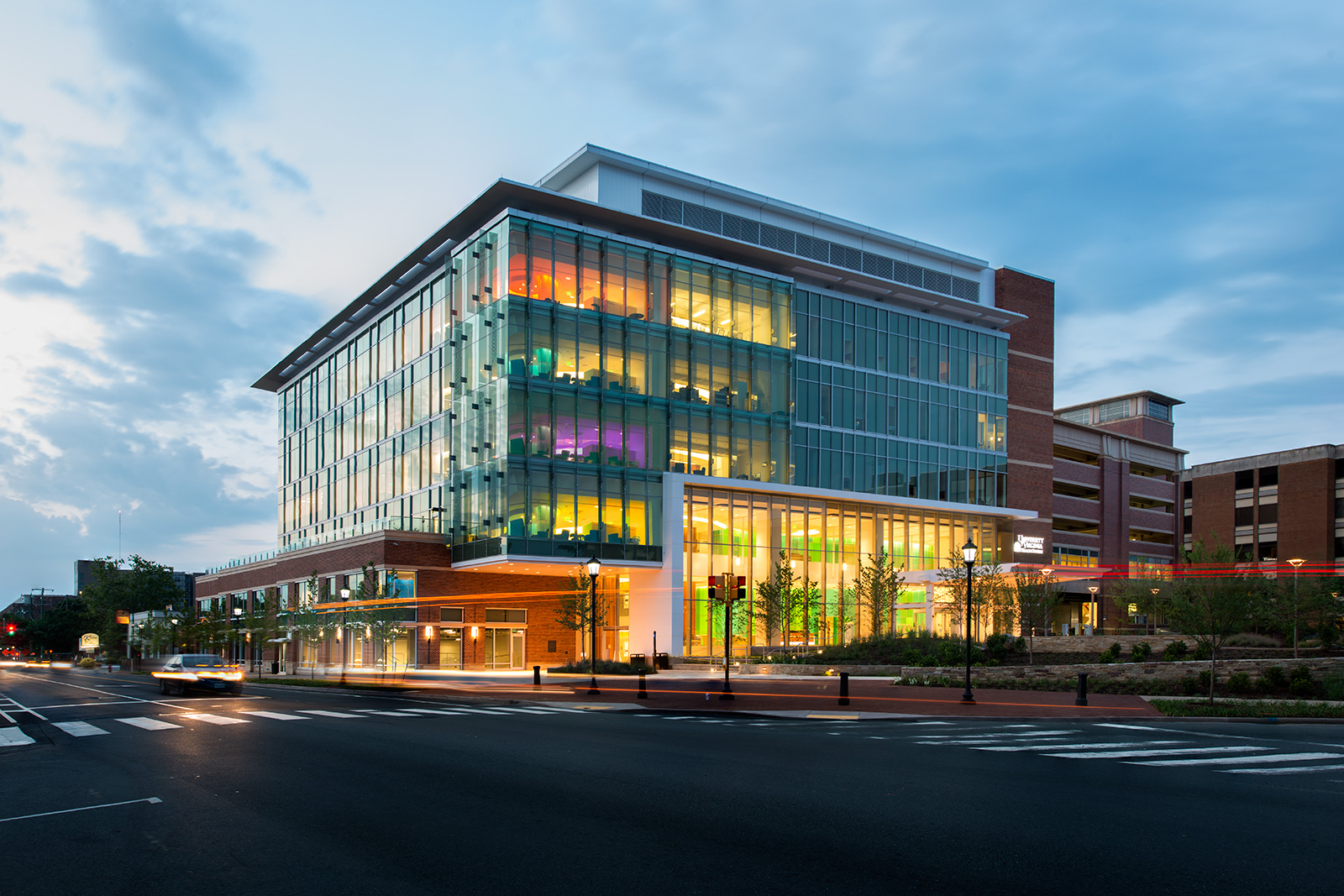
- A picture of the UVA Children's Battle Building at dusk.

Geography
- Location: 1204 W Main St,, Charlottesville, Virginia, United States
- Coordinates: 38.032778°N 78.497370°W

Organization
- Type: Children's hospital
- Affiliated university: University of Virginia School of Medicine

Services
- Emergency department: Yes
- Beds: 112

Helipads
- Helipad: FAA LID: 8VA5 (Shared with UVA Hospital)

Links
- Website: https://childrens.uvahealth.com/
- Lists: Hospitals in Virginia

UVA Children's Hospital is a nationally ranked, acute care children's hospital in Charlottesville, Virginia. It is affiliated with the University of Virginia School of Medicine. The hospital features 112 pediatric beds. The hospital provides comprehensive pediatric specialties and subspecialties to infants, children, teens, and young adults aged 0–21 throughout the region. The hospital also sometimes treats adults that require pediatric care. The hospital has a rooftop helipad to transport critical pediatric cases. The hospital features a regional pediatric intensive-care unit and a level IV neonatal intensive care unit.

== History ==
In 2011 ground was broken for a new outpatient center called the Battle Building, named for Barry and Bill Battle. The building was dedicated in 2014, designed by Stanley Beaman & Sears, and cost $141.5 million to construct. The Battle Building houses pediatric and adult outpatient care and outpatient surgery. At over 200,000 sq ft and 7 floors, there are 12 operating rooms in this building and a clinical trials wing. In 2015 the Battle Building earned a LEED Gold rating.

In February 2016, UVA Children's partnered with UPMC Children's Hospital of Pittsburgh (CHP) to expand their pediatric liver transplant program. CHP is a leader in liver transplants after establishing the first liver transplant center in the U.S.

In 2016 efforts from UVA were made to start renovations all of the pediatric and women's floors of the UVA Children's Hospital. Renovations had to happen while most parts were still operational, slowing down a relatively small renovation. Renovations affected 58,000 square feet on the 7 and 8 floors, and were completed in 2019.

In 2017 UVA Children's Hospital partnered with Children's Hospital of The King's Daughters to improve care for children with congenital heart disease throughout the region, creating the Virginia Congenital Cardiac Collaborative. In 2021, Children's Hospital of Richmond joined the collaborative.

In the wake of the 2020 Coronavirus Pandemic the hospital revised its visitor policy to only allow one parent of each child to stay overnight on the inpatient wards. In addition all visitors are required to wear masks on campus.

In addition to revised visitor policies, in March 2020 the Charlottesville Ronald McDonald House stopped accepting new families while remaining open to families already living there. The house reopened to new families in September 2020.

== About ==
=== Patient care units ===
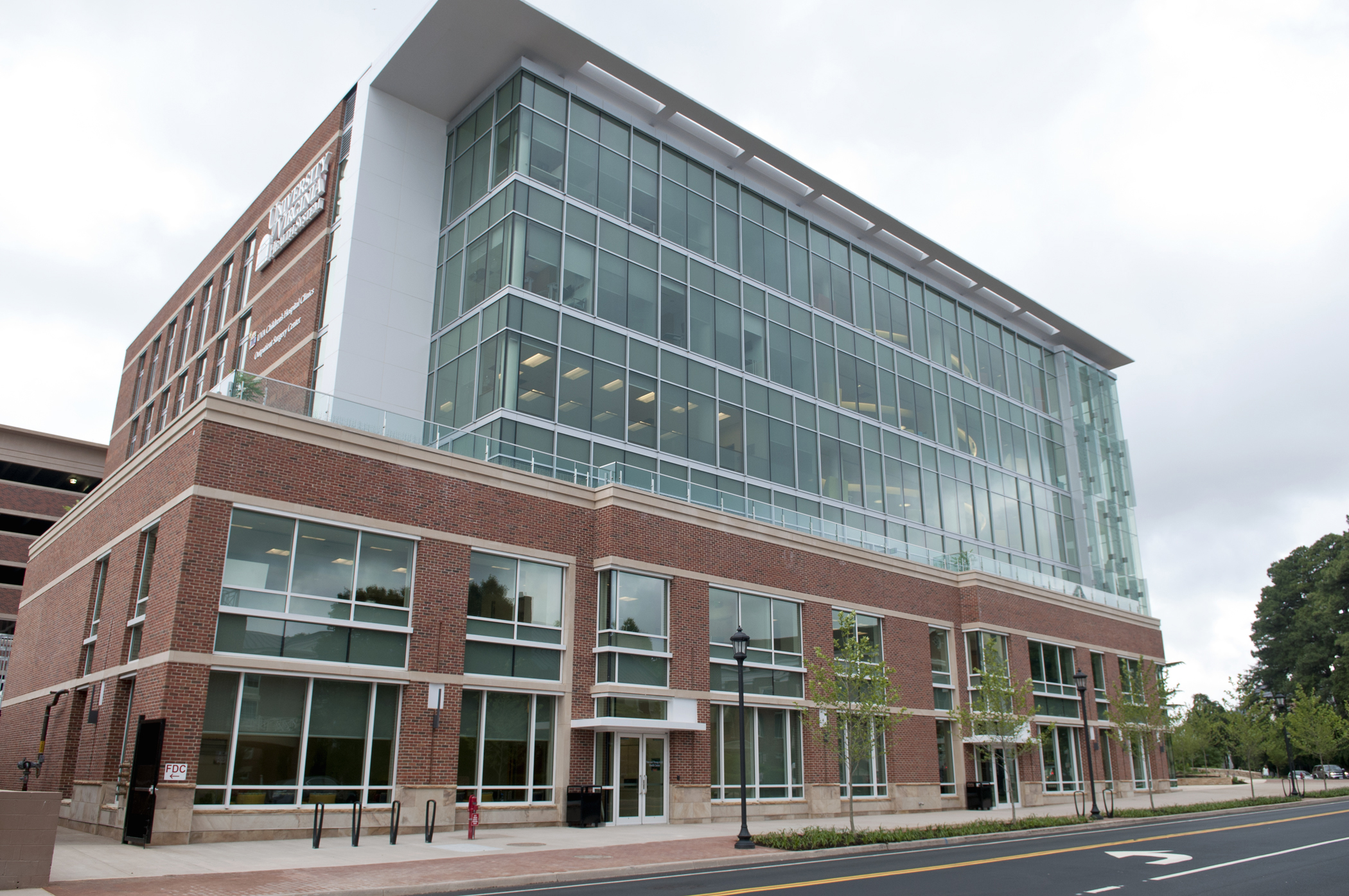
Another picture of the outpatient Battle Building.

The hospital has multiple patient care units to care for a variety of pediatric patients from age 0-21.

- 38-bed Pediatric and Adolescent units
- 20-bed Pediatric Intensive Care Unit
- 54-bed Neonatal Intensive Care Unit

In addition to the patient care units the hospital also has 12 operating rooms and 75 exam rooms in their outpatient Battle Building.

=== Awards ===
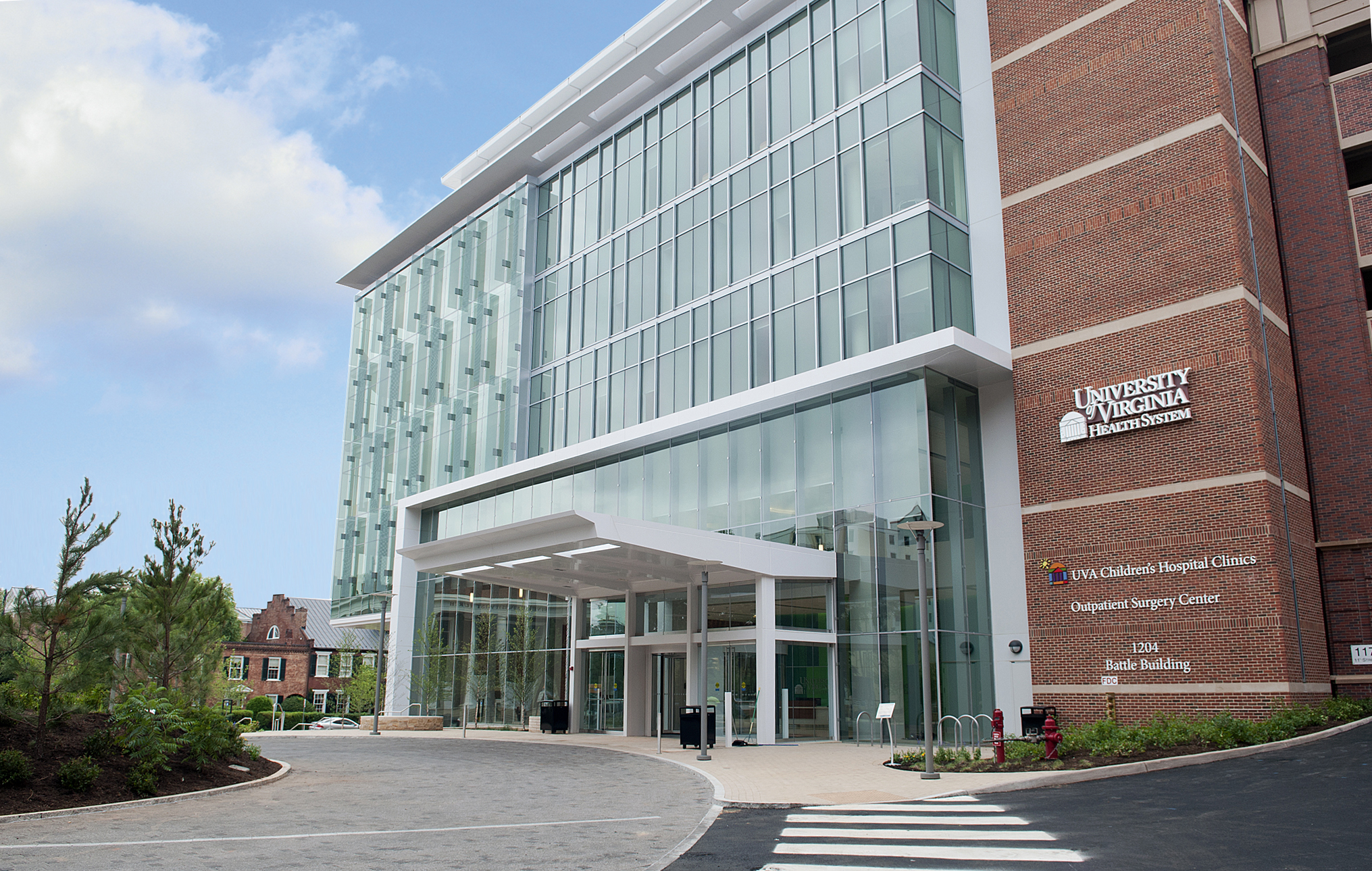
University of Virginia Children's Battle Building

In 2022 the hospital was ranked as the #1 best children's hospital in Virginia by U.S. News & World Report.

U.S. News & World Report Rankings for UVA Children's Hospital
| Specialty | Rank (In the U.S.) | Score (Out of 100) |
|---|---|---|
| Neonatology | #32 | 75.7 |
| Pediatric Cardiology & Heart Surgery | #20 | 74.8 |
| Pediatric Diabetes & Endocrinology | #49 | 67.2 |
| Pediatric Gastroenterology & GI Surgery | #39 | 72.5 |
| Pediatric Pulmonology & Lung Surgery | #44 | 74.5 |
| Pediatric Neurology & Neurosurgery | #45 | 70.4 |

== See also ==
- List of children's hospitals in the United States
- University of Virginia Health System
- University of Virginia School of Medicine
- UPMC Children's Hospital of Pittsburgh
