= Sentara Health =

Healthcare organization serving Virginia and northeastern North Carolina

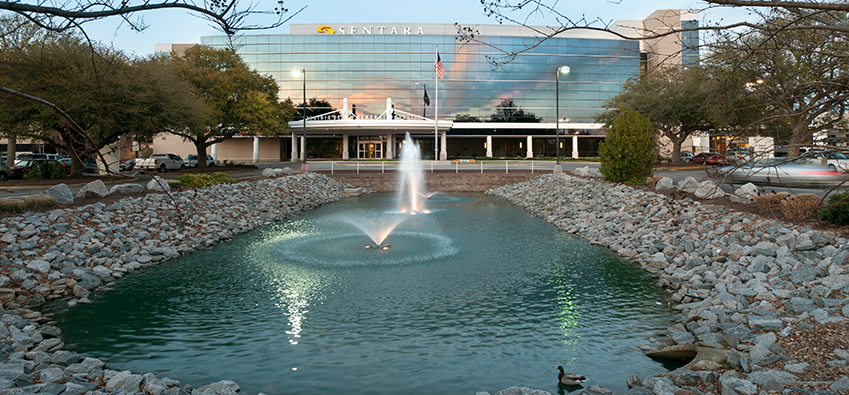
- The Sentara Virginia Beach General Hospital in Virginia Beach, Virginia.
- Company type: Not-for-profit
- Industry: Healthcare
- Founded: 1888
- Headquarters: Norfolk, Virginia
- Areas served: Virginia, North Carolina and Florida
- Key people: Dennis Matheis (CEO)
- Website: www.sentara.com

Sentara Health is a not-for-profit healthcare organization serving Virginia, northeastern North Carolina and Florida. It is based in Norfolk, Virginia, has services in 12 acute care hospitals, and has 1.2 million health plan members in three states. It also operates four medical groups.

== History ==
Although Sentara Health as a corporation was founded in 1972, its origins date back to 1888. That year, the Norfolk Women's Christian Association founded the 25-bed hospital known as the Retreat for the Sick in Norfolk, Virginia. Ten years after its foundation, the hospital was renamed to the Norfolk Protestant Hospital. In 1936, its name was changed again to the Norfolk General Hospital.

Norfolk General was the site of the region's first successful open-heart surgery in 1967. Another Norfolk hospital called the Sarah Leigh Hospital was founded with 35 beds in 1903 by Dr. Southgate Leigh. At the time, the Leigh Hospital was a state-of-the-art facility built with rounded corners, a fire suppression system, and basic air handling.

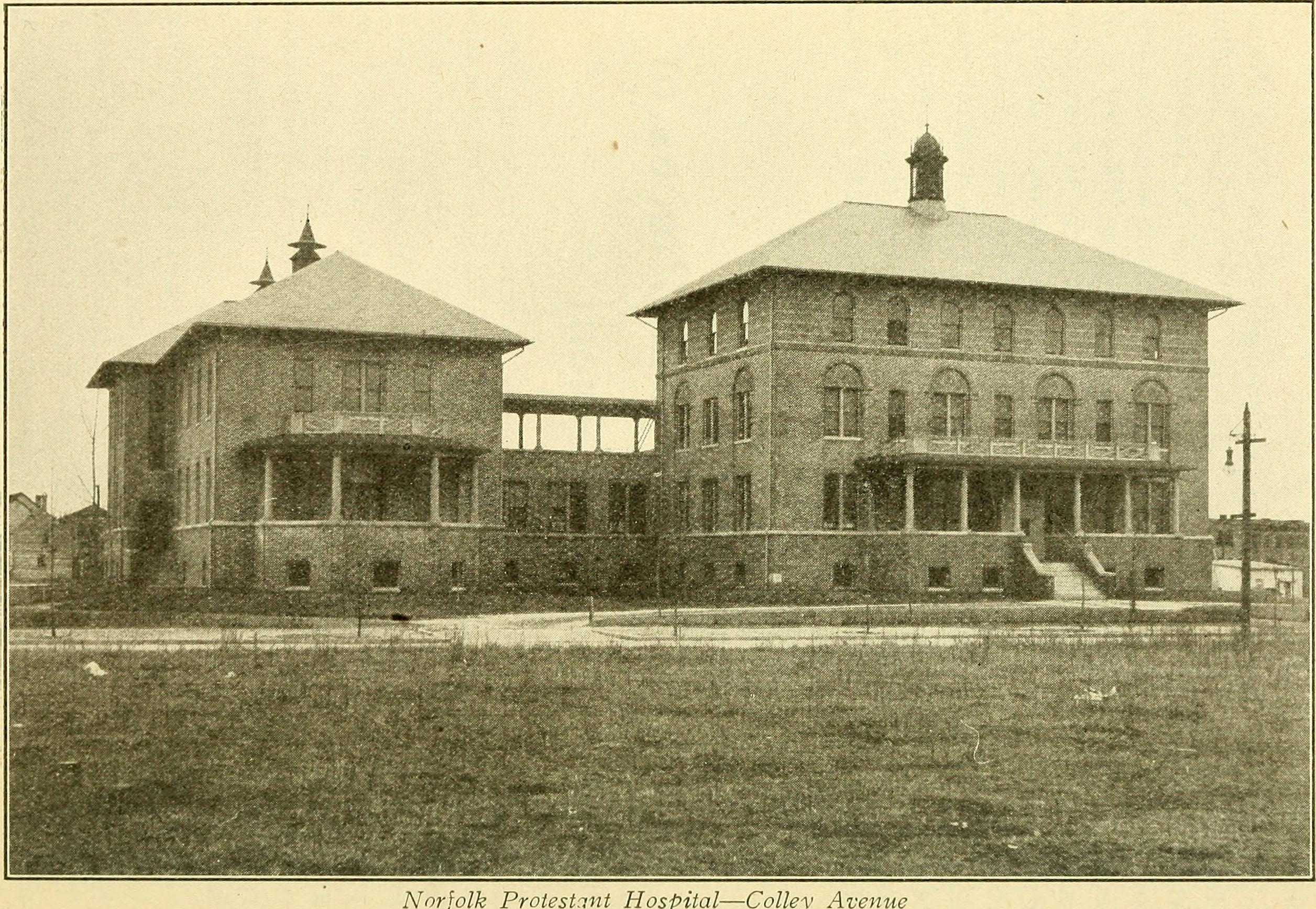
Norfolk Protestant Hospital in 1907.

Norfolk General and Sarah Leigh Hospital formed the foundation of Sentara Health in 1972. Indeed, in that year, Norfolk General Hospital and Leigh Memorial Hospital merged to form a joint corporation called Medical Center Hospitals. One of the first projects undertaken by the merged entity was the construction of a new Leigh Memorial Hospital. The 250-bed hospital was completed in 1977, relocating from its original home in the Ghent neighborhood to its present location on Kempsville Road. In 1981, Elizabeth Carr, the nation's first baby born using the in vitro fertilization procedure, was delivered at Norfolk General Hospital.

On February 25, 1982, the organization deployed its Nightingale air ambulance for the first time. It was the first hospital-based air ambulance in the state of Virginia. It has successfully completed over 20,000 missions from Sentara Norfolk General Hospital as of 2017. In 1983, the organization's name was changed from Medical Center Hospitals to Alliance Health System. In 1984, it began offering the Optima Health Plan HMO. In 1987, the corporation adopted the name "Sentara Health System" (later "Sentara Health"). The names of its properties were also rebranded, including the two main hospitals, and multiple medical care facilities.

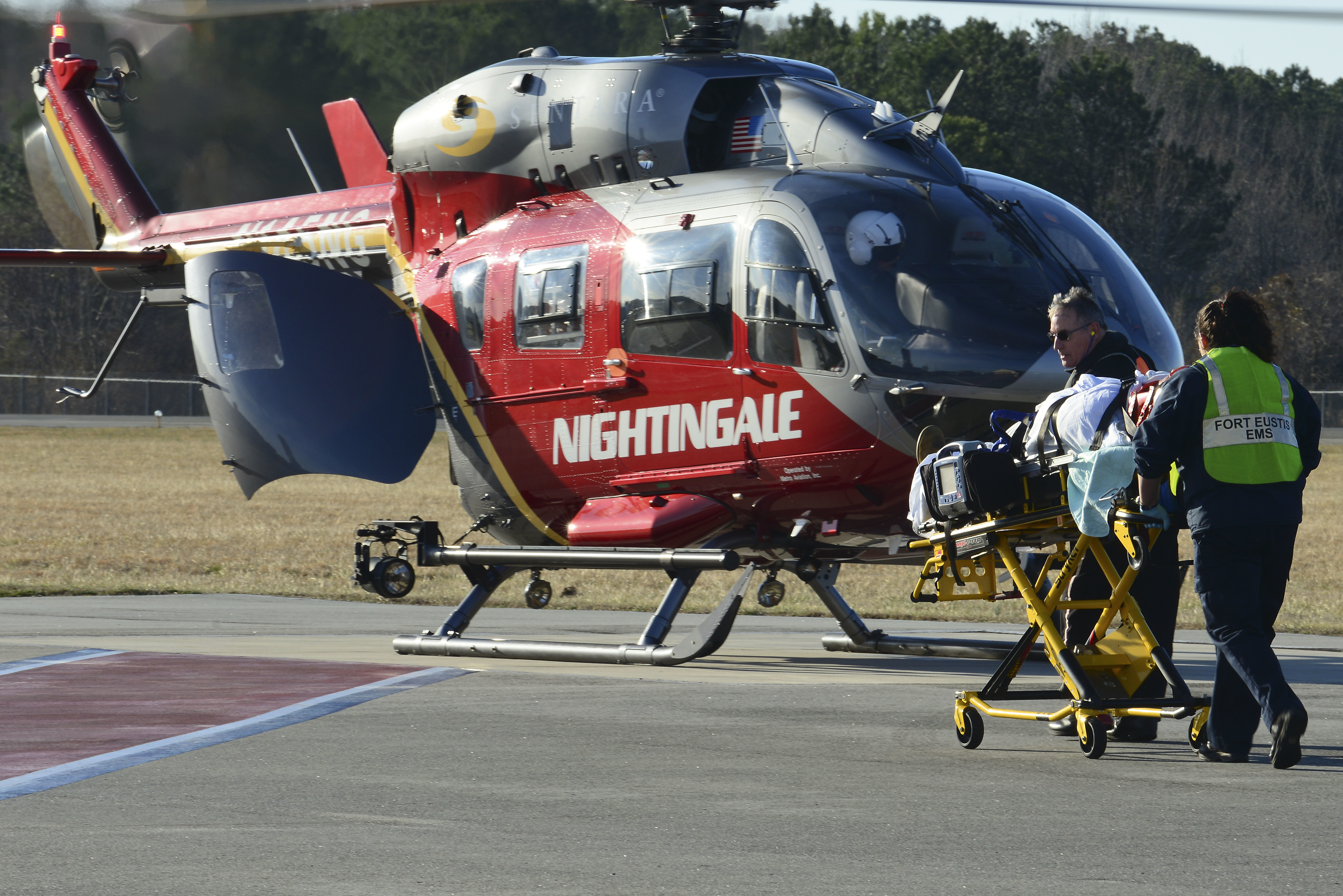
Emergency responders from the McDonald Army Health Center Installation Support Team and Sentara Norfolk General Hospital (Nightingale) during a transport exercise in 2015.

In 1988, Hampton General Hospital joined the system. The following year, doctors at Sentara Norfolk General Hospital performed the region's first successful heart transplant. In 1991, Sentara purchased the Humana Bayside Hospital in Virginia Beach, renaming it Sentara Bayside Hospital. In 1996, Sentara and the Williamsburg Community Hospital entered into a formal partnership which saw Sentara taking a 49% equity stake in the hospital. Sentara eventually took over full ownership of the hospital in 2002, and it later adopted the name, Sentara Williamsburg Regional Medical Center.

In 1998, Sentara merged with Tidewater Health Care, a Virginia Beach–based healthcare system that operated Virginia Beach General Hospital. The organization became known as Sentara Health at that time. Also that year, the Sentara Foundation was created as the charitable arm of the organization, providing grants to other local healthcare entities. In 2000, Sentara Norfolk General Hospital and other Sentara hospitals became the first in the nation to employ "eICU" services in which doctors remotely monitor patients in the ICU. In 2002, the five-story Sentara CarePlex Hospital was completed and replaced the Sentara Hampton General Hospital in Hampton.

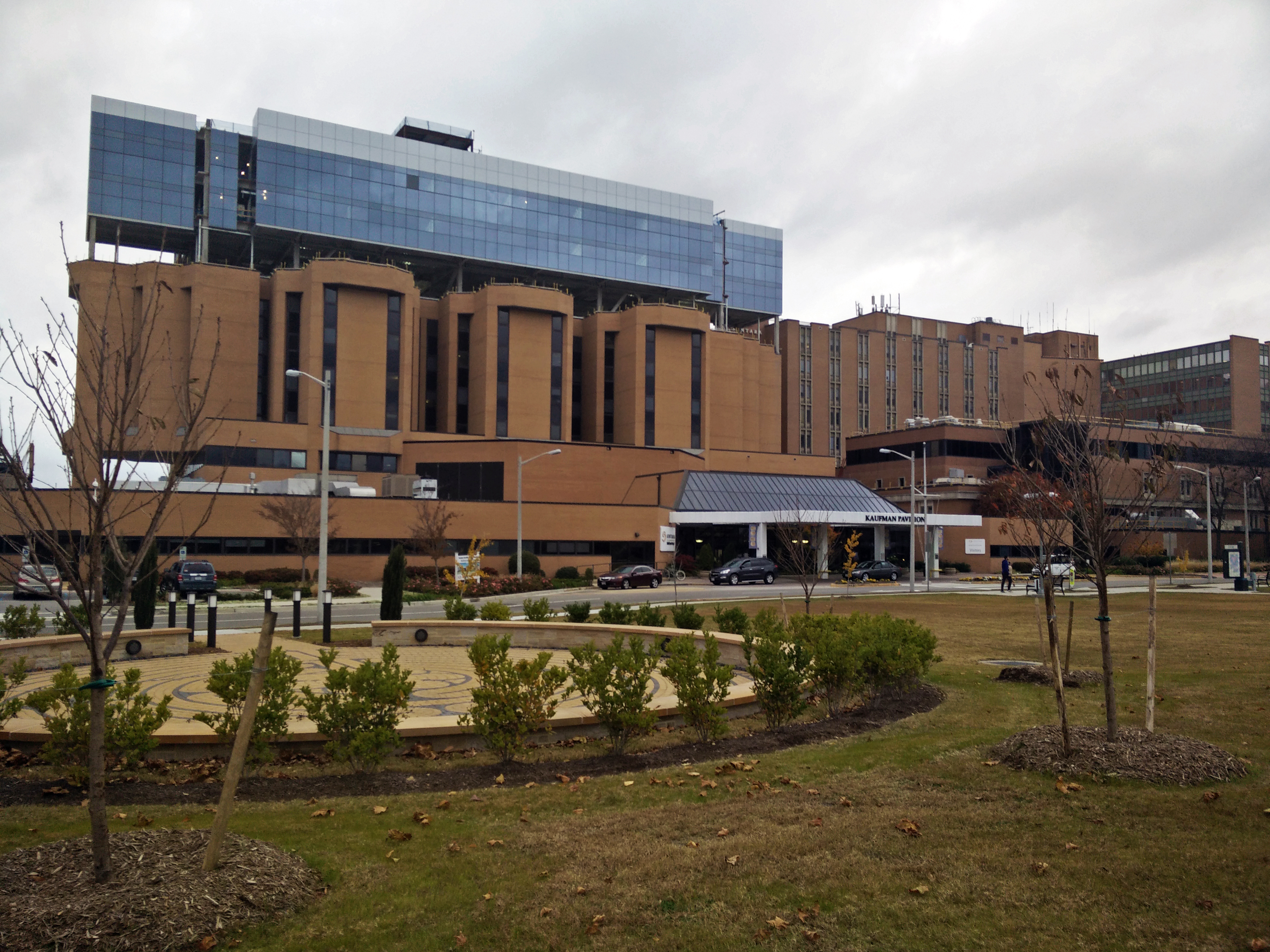
Sentara Norfolk General under construction for expansion in 2016.

In 2005, Sentara announced a deal to merge with Obici Health System, which operated Louise Obici Memorial Hospital in Suffolk. That hospital was renamed "Sentara Obici Hospital." The deal was finalized in early 2006. That year, the 300,000 square-foot Sentara Heart Hospital was completed in Norfolk. In 2011, the Sentara Princess Anne Hospital (a joint venture with competing health system, Bon Secours) was opened in Virginia Beach. At that time, the Sentara Bayside Hospital was renamed "Sentara Independence" and became an outpatient campus and nerve center for Sentara IT operations.

Sentara continued adding hospitals to its network in the intervening years, including Potomac Hospital in Woodbridge (2009), Rockingham Memorial Hospital in Harrisonburg (2010), Martha Jefferson Memorial Hospital in Charlottesville (2011), Halifax Regional Hospital in South Boston (2013), and Sentara Albemarle Medical Center in Elizabeth City, North Carolina (2014). In March 2016, David Bernd stepped down as the system's CEO and was replaced by then president and COO, Howard P. Kern. Bernd had served as CEO since 1995 and had been at the company since 1972. Kern has been with Sentara since 1980.

In 2016, Sentara announced a $199 million expansion to its Norfolk General Hospital. In 2018, it announced a $93.5-million cancer center to be built in Norfolk, scheduled to be completed in 2020. In 2019, Sentara acquired Virginia Premier, a health plan founded by the VCU Health System.

In August 2020, Sentara Health and Greensboro, North Carolina–based Cone Health announced their intent to merge. At the conclusion of the due diligence period in June 2021, both health systems announced that they would not move forward with the merger.

In 2023, Sentara merged Virginia Premier into Optima Health.

== Operation ==
As of 2019, the Sentara Health network includes 12 acute care hospitals, it previously included 10 nursing centers and an assisted-living facility until they were sold in 2020. It is Virginia's third-largest employer. It also operates more than 300 sites of care in Virginia and northeastern North Carolina with various outpatient facilities and home and hospice services. In addition, its health plans division serves Virginia and Florida. Sentara also owns the Nightingale Regional Air Ambulance, a specialized helicopter equipped with cardiac and pulmonary equipment, like an intra-aortic balloon pump and 12-lead EKG monitor. It has successfully completed over 20,000 missions since its inception in 1982.

== List of Sentara hospitals ==
- Sentara Albemarle Medical Center (Elizabeth City, NC)
- Sentara Careplex Hospital (Hampton, VA)
- Sentara Halifax Regional Hospital (South Boston, VA)
- Sentara Heart Hospital (Norfolk, VA)
- Sentara Leigh Hospital (Norfolk, VA)
- Sentara Martha Jefferson Hospital (Charlottesville, VA)
- Sentara Norfolk General Hospital (Norfolk, VA)
- Sentara Northern Virginia Medical Center (Woodbridge, VA)
- Sentara Obici Hospital (Suffolk, VA)
- Sentara Princess Anne Hospital (Virginia Beach, VA)
- Sentara RMH Medical Center (Harrisonburg, VA)
- Sentara Virginia Beach General Hospital (Virginia Beach, VA)
- Sentara Williamsburg Regional Medical Center (Williamsburg, VA)
