= Richard Lewandowski =

Australian craniofacial surgeon

Richard Lewandowski FRACS
- Born: 1957 or 1958 (age 67–68); Brisbane, Queensland, Australia
- Education: University of Queensland; Royal Australasian College of Surgeons; Eastern Virginia Medical School
- Occupation: craniofacial surgeon
- Known for: Founder of Operation Smile (Australia)
- Awards: Queensland Great (2004); UQ VC's Diversity Award for Almuni (2012)

Richard Andrew Lewandowski (born 1957 or 1958) is an Australian plastic and reconstructive surgeon.

He is best known for performing reconstructive craniofacial surgery for children and young adults with such issues as cleft lips, cleft palates and facial deformities.

In 1999, Lewandowski founded the Australian chapter of Operation Smile which was established to provide accessible surgery for patients from developing countries.

== Life and career ==
Lewandowski attended Nashville State High School and then studied medicine at the University of Queensland, graduating with a Bachelor of Medicine, Bachelor of Surgery in 1981.

He then became a Fellow of the Royal Australasian College of Surgeons in 1990.

After completing his plastic surgery training in Australia, Lewandowski relocated to Virginia in the United States to study craniomaxillofacial surgery where he met William P. Magee Jr., the founder of Operation Smile who asked Lewandowski to accompany him to a surgery in Colombia.

In 1995, Lewandowski achieved a Fellowship Diploma in Craniomaxillofacial Surgery from the Eastern Virginia Medical School.

Throughout his career, Lewandowski has held numerous senior positions including:

- Director of Surgery at the Brisbane Mater Hospital
- Chairman and founder of Global Controversies in Skin Cancer Conference
- Chairman of the Lady Cilento Children's Hospital Craniofacial Unit
- Chairman of the Queensland State Committee of the Royal Australasian College of Surgeons
- President of the Plastic and Reconstructive Surgery Society
- President of the Australasian Society of Craniomaxillofacial Surgeons
- Chairman of the Greenslopes Private Hospital Plastic Surgery Unit
- Chairman of the Northwest Private Hospital Operating Theatre Committee

As the head of the Australasian College of Surgeons' state trauma committee, Lewandowski regularly spoke publicly about Queensland's poor road toll and deaths of children in quad bike accidents.

In 2022, Lewandowski submitted a thesis to the University of Queensland for a Master of Philosophy degree.

== Honours ==
In 2004, Lewandowski was named as a Queensland Great.

Lewandowski was the recipient of the University of Queensland Vice-Chancellor's Diversity Award for Alumni in 2012.
