= Aaron I. Vinik =

South African physician-scientist

- Born: 1937
- Died: June 15, 2023 (aged 85–86); Norfolk, Virginia

Aaron I. Vinik was a South African and American physician-scientist who contributed to the studies of clinical neuropathy and neuroendocrine tumors (NETS). He is credited with having discovered both the Islet Neogenesis Associated Protein (INGAP) gene responsible for stimulating immature cells in the diabetic pancreas to produce insulin and the chemical substance ilotropin. For his work Vinik earned the American College of Endocrinology (AACE) Distinction in Endocrinology Award and a professorship in his name at Eastern Virginia Medical School.

== Early life and education ==
Aaron Israel Vinik was born in 1937 in Van Ryan, Transvaal, South Africa. His parents were Ashkenazi Jewish immigrants from Lithuania ("Litvaks") who had fled the antisemitic sociopolitical climate of Eastern Europe. In South Africa, the Vinik family became shopkeepers, and whilst living in the town of Benoni Aaron excelled in academics and sports. Encouraged to pursue education, he entered medical school at the University of the Witwatersrand in Johannesburg in 1955, where he proved a skilled football and pinball player. Vinik married literature student Etta Fram in December 1959.

== Career ==
Vinik concluded his chief residency at Chris Hani Baragwanath Hospital in Johannesburg, and began his research in the treatment of patients with hyperthyroidism in the Department of Endocrinology, Metabolism and diabetes at the University of Cape Town. The focus of his doctoral thesis was the study of fatty acid metabolism in individuals with hyperthyroidism. Vinik later held a position as a Senior Lecturer in Chemical Pathology, and in collaboration with Septimus Matthys Joubert, studied the role of human growth hormone in clinical disease and diabetes.

During a visiting fellowship at the University of California in San Francisco, Vinik studied chorionic somatomammotropin. A brief return to South Africa saw scholarly output on the physiology of enteroendocrine hormones and diabetics with pancreaitis. He moved to the United States and became a professor of Internal Medicine and Surgery at the University of Michigan. His work there contributed to the understanding of treating patients with somatostatin analogues. In 1990, Eastern Virginia Medical School recruited Vinik to lead research at its Strelitz Diabetes Center. He subsequently served as professor of internal medicine, Director of Research at the center, and Murray Waitzer Endowed Chair in Diabetes Research. He remained associated with EVMS until his retirement and was later named professor emeritus.

In 1996, under his direction, scientists at the Strelitz Diabetes Center at Eastern Virginia Medical School discovered a gene they termed INGAP. Developments in medical research identified the potential of this gene for therapies and a possible cure for diabetes.

Vinik holds patents, including for NutriNerve, a natural supplement that helps the body repair itself on a cellular level.

== Personal life ==
Aaron Vinik and his wife Etta were married for 64 years until his death. His wife was often a partner to his work, including in the development of a Quality of Life fatigue tool. They had three sons: Howard is a businessman, Bryan is an endocrinologist who specializes in the treatment of diabetes and metabolic disorders, and Steven is a wealth management executive.
