= Williamsburg Community Hospital =

Former hospital in Virginia, United States

Coordinates: 37°16′44.8″N 76°43′25.2″W

Williamsburg Community Hospital was located on Mt. Vernon Ave. in Williamsburg, Virginia, and served the community from 1961 until 2006. In August 2006, it was replaced by a newer and larger facility, the 139-bed Sentara Williamsburg Regional Medical Center, located in adjacent York County, Virginia.

After patients and equipment were transferred, the vacant older facility was donated to a long time neighboring organization, the College of William and Mary. In the fall of 2006, the college announced plans to build a new School of Education on the site, which is located about one mile from the Historic Area of Colonial Williamsburg.
