= Eastern Virginia Medical School =

Public medical school in Norfolk, Virginia, U.S.

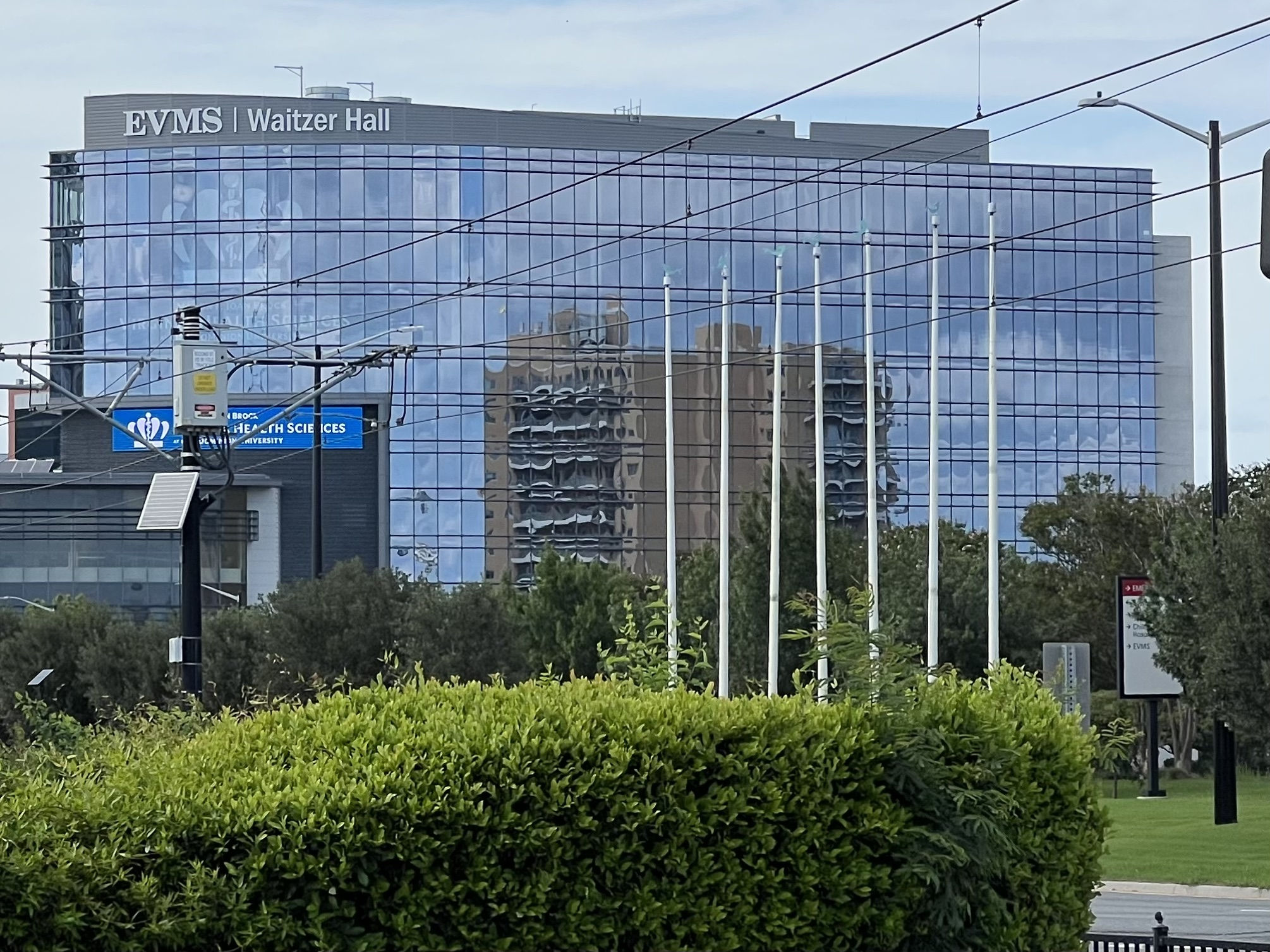
- Waitzer Hall at EVMS
- Motto: Community focus. World impact.
- Type: Public medical school
- Established: 1973; 53 years ago
- Academic affiliations: Liaison Committee on Medical Education
- Endowment: $173.25 million (2025)
- President: Alfred Z. Abuhamad
- Vice-president: C. Donald Combs
- Dean: Judette Louis
- Academic staff: 574
- Students: 1,261
- Postgraduates: 578
- Doctoral students: 683
- Location: Norfolk, Virginia, U.S. 36.860556°N 76.3025°W
- Campus: Urban, 500 acres (2.02 km^{2})
- Colors: EVMS Blue and Black
- Website: www.evms.edu

Eastern Virginia Medical School (EVMS), part of the Macon and Joan Brock Virginia Health Sciences at Old Dominion University, commonly known as Virginia Health Sciences, is a public medical school in Norfolk, Virginia, operated by Old Dominion University. Founded by grassroots efforts in the southeastern part of Virginia known as Hampton Roads, EVMS had historically not been affiliated with an undergraduate institution and therefore coordinates training through multiple medical centers in the Hampton Roads region. Effective on July 1, 2024, the nearby Old Dominion University merged with EVMS to create a comprehensive university with EVMS being the medical school component of the larger university.

The campus includes the Sentara Norfolk General Hospital, the region's only tertiary level 1 trauma medical care facility, and the Children's Hospital of The King's Daughters, a regional pediatric referral care facility and only stand-alone children's hospital in the state. EVMS is the first institution in the US to have produced a viable fetus through in vitro fertilization. EVMS is most known for its reproductive medicine and simulation/standardized-patient education as well as research in pediatrics, geriatrics, diabetes, cancer, and neuroscience.

Judette Louis has served as dean since 2025.

== History ==
In 1824, Thomas Jefferson remarked that Norfolk would be an ideal location for a medical school branch of his alma mater, The College of William & Mary, albeit for its less than desirable climate. He wrote “No sir, Richmond is no place to furnish subjects for clinical lectures. I have always had Norfolk in view for this purpose. The climate and Pontine country around Norfolk render it truly sickly in itself.”

In the 1960s, the metropolitan area of Southeastern Virginia known as Hampton Roads recognized that the region did not have enough physicians to support its growing population. In an attempt to close the gap, area leaders decided to found a regional medical school to both attract physicians from outside areas and to produce "home-grown" practitioners. It was thought that a university medical center operating in conjunction with previously operating regional health care facilities would effectively end the shortage and more importantly, bring a bevy of experts and specialists to the area. The idea gained the support of the Virginia General Assembly and the city councils of Chesapeake, Hampton, Newport News, Norfolk, Portsmouth, Suffolk and Virginia Beach. March 31, 1964, the General Assembly authorized the formation of what was then known as the Norfolk Area Medical Center Authority.

In 1970, fundraising by the EVMS foundation began the collection of funds for the creation of EVMS. Before acceptance of its first class, more than $17 million had been donated from community and business leaders. Eastern Virginia Medical School accepted its first MD students who matriculated September 28, 1973 for classes that began October 1, 1973. The following year, the EVMS Office of Graduate Medical Education was established to coordinate residency and fellowship training programs. EVMS has since graduated its 30th class of physicians, with one in four of all local physicians having some connection to the university. In the spring of 2008, the Commonwealth of Virginia approved appropriating capital outlay funds to EVMS to allow it to increase its doctoral student enrollment by 30% and its physician assistant program by 60%. When this expansion is completed, the total student enrollment will rise to approximately 1,000.

Throughout its history, the merger of the school with nearby universities has been raised but never carried out, with various joint programs and resource sharing occurring. However, on July 25, 2012, EVMS made a joint announcement with The College of William & Mary that the two schools are considering merging so that EVMS would become the William & Mary School of Medicine. Any such merger would have to be confirmed by the two schools and then confirmed by the Virginia General Assembly and the Governor. A pilot relationship, supported by $200,000 grant in the Virginia budget, was subsequently agreed upon by both universities to examine this possible union in reality. On January 1, 2024 EVMS officially merged with Old Dominion University.

On January 10, 2013, it was announced that Harry Lester was to step down as president and would be succeeded by the school's dean and provost, Richard V. Homan, MD, effective April 15, 2013. Homan served jointly as the school's president, dean of the medical school, and provost until 2021.

Between January 28 and February 1, 2019, national news media reported that the 1984 student yearbook included racist photos of students, particularly a photo of one student in blackface and another dressed as a Ku Klux Klan member. These reports were connected to Ralph Northam, former governor of Virginia, leading to demands for his resignation. Northam denied that the photograph was of him and he vowed to complete his term.

In 2025, Judette Louis was named as the school's dean.

== Academics ==
=== Admissions ===
Approximately 7,000 applicants apply to the Eastern Virginia Medical School's MD program every year for a targeted class size of 150. For the MD Class of 2030, the school received more than 9,000 applications, surpassing the 7,614 applications received for the MD Class of 2029.

In recent years, the average EVMS accepted student for the MD program had a 3.70 GPA and an average 513 MCAT score.

=== Rankings ===
In 2024, U.S. News & World Report ranked EVMS as a Tier 3 school in Best Medical Schools: Research, as a Tier 3 school in Best Medical Schools: Primary Care, #52 in Most Diverse Medical Schools (tie), #52 in Most Graduates Practicing in Health Professional Shortage Areas, #101 in Most Graduates Practicing in Primary Care (tie), #134 in Most Graduates Practicing in Rural Areas, #27 in Physician Assistant (tie), and #140 in Public Health (tie).

=== Programs ===
In 2016, EVMS implemented the Care Forward curriculum that teaches medical students through a system-based approach. Community services play a significant part of the curriculum as students have several tracks of service projects that eventually lead to a specific keystone project to be completed before graduation.

Besides MD training, EVMS offers a variety of other medical training (degree programs), including the Bachelor of Science, Master of Science, Master of Public Health, and Ph.D. It also offers a joint M.D./Master of Business Administration with the College of William & Mary.

== Research centers ==
=== Leroy T. Canoles Jr. Cancer Research Center ===
The George L. Wright Jr. Proteomics Lab, a leader in the field, is now housed within this new center for cancer research. The center also includes a Biorepository that collects, processes and stores biological specimens and associated data. The Biorepository currently has 70,000 human samples available. The center is named in honor of Norfolk lawyer, community leader and philanthropist Leroy T. "Buddy" Canoles Jr.

=== Sentara Center for Simulation and Immersive Learning ===
One of only a handful in the country that integrates task trainers, computerized manikins, virtual interfaces and standardized patients (people trained to portray patients) to create more realistic training scenarios. The new center incorporates the preexisting Theresa A. Thomas Professional Skills Teaching and Assessment Center, which helped pioneer the use of standardized patient education. In addition, a 3-D Virtual Reality lab known as "The Cave" is under construction. This system allows physicians and those in training to simulate real-life medical and physiological situations in an interactive/immersive, computer-based arena.

=== CONRAD ===
As a Division of the Department of Obstetrics and Gynecology and the Jones Institute, CONRAD is one of the campuses leading research organizations. The group recently was awarded a $100 million grant for work on Microbicides, which are products in development that will eventually come in a variety of forms (such as topical gels, creams, tablets, films and pills) to prevent sexual transmission of HIV and potentially other sexually transmitted infections.

=== The Jones Institute for Reproductive Medicine ===
As described above, the Jones Institute was the first American body to perform In Vitro Fertilization. It continues today to further reproductive and endocrine research.

=== Strelitz Diabetes Center ===
As a leader in research for Diabetes, the Strelitz Diabetes Center has made several findings. Dr. Aaron Vinik, one of the leading researchers in the field, discovered the importance of INGAP gene, which plays a role on pancreatic insulin cell regeneration. With the recruitment of Dr. Jerry Nadler, a world renown diabetes researcher, Sentara Norfolk General Hospital Diabetes and Endocrine jumped in national ranking to #24

=== The Virginia Academy of Sleep Medicine ===
Staffed by several EVMS physicians and scientists, this organization strives to educate health professionals in the discipline of sleep medicine, seeking to improve the quality of life and health of patients who suffer from sleep-related disorders. Several sleep-labs scattered throughout the region allow practitioners to evaluate, treat and research these afflictions.

=== M. Foscue Brock Institute for Community and Global Health ===
Established in 2012 with a $3 million gift from Macon and Joan Brock, founders of Dollar Tree Inc., the institute serves as a center for interdisciplinary collaboration for both community and global health outreach. It will bring experts, faculty and students together to further the mission of the school and that is to be the most community oriented medical school in the nation. Karen Remley, MD, MBA, the former Virginia Health Commissioner, will serve as the founding director of the institute starting on March 18, 2013.

== Campus ==
=== Eastern Virginia Medical Campus ===
Eastern Virginia Medical School is located in Norfolk, VA, near downtown and the historic neighborhood of Ghent. The school is part of the Eastern Virginia Medical Center, which also includes the aforementioned hospitals and affiliated satellite buildings, along with a "Medical Tower," that has many private practice medical offices. The center is bounded by Colley Avenue, Brambleton Avenue, Hampton Boulevard, and Redgate Avenue. The Tide light-rail system connects the campus with downtown Norfolk and points east to the Virginia Beach city line. The campus facilities include:

- Sentara Norfolk General Hospital – The region's primary tertiary care referral center and only Level One trauma center. The 555-bed hospital serves as the major teaching hospital for EVMS students and residents.
- Sentara Heart Hospital – ranked 38th in the nation for cardiac care, this 6-story, 112-bed new addition to Norfolk General accommodates the most specialized cardiac procedures and treatments
- Children's Hospital of the King's Daughters – The regions only free-standing children's hospital, this non-profit, 212-bed facility includes the full slate of pediatric specialists.
- Lewis Hall – Named for Richmond philanthropists and early EVMS supporters Frances and Sydney Lewis, Eastern Virginia's primary education and research facility. Funding was allocated by the state to provide extensive renovation to this original campus building.
- Edward E. Brickell Medical Sciences Library – Opened in March 2000 and houses the original Moorman Memorial Library collection, a computer lab, a computer classroom, historical collections, archives, and group and individual study seating. The library including the study rooms and computer labs were updated as part of the campus wide renovation project that was completed in 2011.
- Hofheimer Hall – Named in honor of Elise and Henry Clay Hofheimer II. This building has recently undergone massive renovation, consolidating all clinical departmental clinics of EVMS Health Services under one roof.
- Andrews Hall (formerly Fairfax Hall) – Houses a variety of educational and administrative offices, including the Office of the President and the Office of Development. After a complete renovation in 2010, it was renamed after the late founders and brothers, Bill and Mason Andrews.

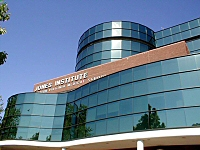
The Jones Institute for Reproductive Medicine

- The Jones Institute for Reproductive Medicine – Named after Georgeanna Seegar Jones and Howard W. Jones, EVMS faculty members who pioneered in vitro fertilization, this facility opened in 1992. The new building brought together in one location the 150 physicians, scientists, and staff of the Department of Obstetrics and Gynecology's renowned division of reproductive medicine. This center is best known for production of America's first "test-tube baby" and also is the location of CONRAD (Contraceptive Research and Development) laboratories.
- Center for Pediatric Research – A facility on the South Campus which was opened in conjunction with The Children's Hospital of The King's Daughters. Ongoing research includes topics such as vaccinations, asthma and antibiotics. Several CHKD outpatient offices are also located within this building.
- Smith-Rogers Hall – Originally part of Leigh Memorial Hospital, this building served in the early 1970s as the temporary home for EVMS while Lewis Hall was being constructed. Today it houses EVMS administrative offices, including the Human Resources Department and the Office of Marketing & Communications.
- E.V. Williams Hall – Located on the South Campus and named after a local benefactor, this is home to the Department of Internal Medicine's Division of Endocrinology and Diabetes and The Strelitz Diabetes Institute. This center provides education, in-patient and outpatient care, and research focused on minimizing complications of diabetes and finding a cure.
- Harry T. Lester Hall – Recently completed in the Fall of 2011, this additional educational and research space was built to accommodate the growing need for future medical personnel predicted by the AAMC. EVMS has been actively increasing enrollment, specifically in the MD and MPA programs, as well as augmenting the current research programs at the university. Specifically, this building houses new research laboratories, the Leroy T. Canoles Jr. Cancer Research Center and the Center for Simulation and Immersive Learning (which incorporates the pre-existing Theresa A. Thomas Professional Skills Teaching and Assessment Center; one of the first and most well-known standardized patient laboratories). The building initially had the moniker "Medical Education and Research Building," but was renamed for the popular president when he retired after 13 years of service. Mr. Lester is credited with achieving parity with other Virginia medical schools in terms of state support for educational programs in addition to garnering the $59 million in capital funds for the building (a first for EVMS).
- Norfolk Public Health Building – The headquarters of the Norfolk's Public Health department and a branch of the Virginia Department of Health, this building hosts many free clinics and is also the location of the Norfolk Medical Examiner/Coroner's office.

== Governance ==
As EVMS has a unique public/private structure unlike most schools in Virginia, the structure of the Board of Visitors is also unique.

- two non-legislative members to be appointed at large by the Governor of Virginia
- two non-legislative members to be appointed by the Senate Committee on Rules
- three non-legislative members to be appointed by the Speaker of the Virginia House of Delegates
- six members to be appointed by the Eastern Virginia Medical School Foundation
- four members who shall be appointed by their respective city councils as follows:

two members from the City of Norfolk
one member from the City of Virginia Beach
one member appointed by the following city councils in a rotating manner beginning with the cities of Chesapeake, Hampton, Portsmouth, Suffolk and Newport News

As part of the 2008 Virginia General Assembly session, a compromise was reached in order to include EVMS in Governor Tim Kaine's $1.43 Billion bond to finance renovation and construction at Virginia's universities, state colleges, and government facilities. In the compromise, EVMS would allow seven of its Board of Visitors to be appointed by the Governor, House, and Senate of Virginia in order to meet the definition of a public university which some state legislators did not believe EVMS currently fit.

== Local health initiatives ==
The vision of Eastern Virginia Medical School has been plainly stated to be "recognized as the most community-oriented medical school in the nation." This is largely a product of the school's founding principles and origins; fostered by way of cooperation between the individual localities of Hampton Roads, the ultimate goal was to have more "home-grown" physicians. It is also echoed in the school's mission statement and numerous community activities, outreach programs and educational opportunities.

=== H.O.P.E.S Clinic (Heath Outreach Partnership with EVMS Students Clinic) ===
A completely free clinic housed within the Norfolk Public Health Building, the HOPES clinic is staffed entirely by volunteer students, resident-physicians and local clinicians. The H.O.P.E.S. Started in early 2011 by several EVMS students, it the first free clinic of its kind in the state, and the only one in Norfolk offering free services. All costs associated with the clinic are covered through private donations from local businesses, organizations, individuals, and students.

=== N.E.S.T. (Norfolk Emergency Shelter Team) ===
A locally run system of winter shelters for the homeless, EVMS students and resident-physicians have long helped staff the shelters of this organization. The physicians-in-training often set up health screenings during this time, helping assess for diseases such as diabetes, hypertension within these homeless populations. Those screened are then oft referred to local free or reduced-fee clinics for treatment.

=== Beyond Clinic Walls ===
Beyond Clinic Walls (BCW) pairs interdisciplinary student teams with older adults facing complex medical and social challenges. Student teams make home visits every two weeks to their assigned client for the duration of the academic year. Student teams work collaboratively, with each team member contributing their discipline's unique insight, to help clients maintain their independence and quality of life. BCW provides the organizational structure, resources, and continuity of care to foster and support the development of rich and meaningful relationships between student volunteers and older adults.

=== EVMS Lions Club ===
The EVMS Lions Club is a nonprofit organization devoted to helping provide ophthalmology and optometry services in the Hampton Roads area. The very active chapter at EVMS provides vision screenings at health fairs frequently throughout the community.

== Global health initiatives ==
=== Master of Public Health International Practicum Projects ===
Individuals who are pursuing a degree in public health are given the opportunity to do their research thesis abroad in several locations. The purpose of the projects is to give the individual students a unique perspective on how to do public health research projects in developing countries. The MPH department at EVMS has two established locations in the Democratic Republic of the Congo and Peru. The research and service projects serves to help provide healthcare to the communities that have developed in areas where few services exist.

=== International Medical Missions ===
Students and faculty from all health professions embark annually on medical missions to Peru, Haiti and the Democratic Republic of Congo. Mission is to bring medication and healthcare services to various rural communities. In partnership with local organizations with EVMS roots, students can also participate in medical missions with Operation Smile and Physicians for Peace.

=== Global Health Coalition ===
The Global Health Coalition is an umbrella organization dedicated to increasing awareness, knowledge, and interest in international health through strategic coordination of global health related student organizations and activities at EVMS. GHC sponsors events and speakers on a number of international health topics, and facilitates the participation of EVMS students in international health internships and activities.

=== Institute for Healthcare Improvement (IHI) ===
The Institute for Healthcare Improvement (IHI) is an independent not-for-profit organization helping to lead the improvement of health care throughout the world. The IHI is a reliable source of energy, knowledge, and support for a never-ending campaign to improve health care worldwide. Founded in 1991 and based in Cambridge, Massachusetts, IHI works to accelerate improvement by building the will for change, cultivating promising concepts for improving patient care, and helping health care systems put those ideas into action. The group aims to improve the lives of patients, the health of communities, and the joy of the health care workforce by focusing on an ambitious set of goals adapted from the Institute of Medicine's six improvement aims for the health care system: Safety, Effectiveness, Patient-Centeredness, Timeliness, Efficiency, and Equity.

=== Medical French ===
Founded in 2018, the EVMS Medical French program partners with the Norfolk Chapter of Alliance Française to allow student participants to complete certification as French Speaking Clinicians. The multi-faceted program consists of language classes, conversation groups, lectures, clinical outreach, and cultural training. This initiative aims at improving the quality and accessibility of healthcare for vulnerable French-speaking communities in the Hampton Roads areas. This program also prepares students to work in international francophone settings.

== Community service organizations ==
In addition to serving the community with several medically oriented groups, EVMS students and faculty are very active in general service.

=== Coats for Kids ===
EVMS students began collecting new and used coats through Coats for Kids—formerly "Operation Overcoat"—in 1987. Coats for Kids distributes thousands of coats each year to the area's needy children. WAVY-TV is media sponsor of Coats for Kids. Albano Cleaners dry clean all the donated coats and distribute them among the distribution sites. Despite outgrowing its origins as a simple student-run event, EVMS has continued to participate, with students volunteering several times yearly at the on-campus drop-off and distribution site.

=== Haunted Hallway ===
Beginning in 2002, EVMS students radically transform academic buildings into a "Haunted Hallway" for local children who would otherwise be unable to enjoy traditional Halloween activities due to safety concerns. Families are provided shuttle service to campus for an array of traditional Halloween activities, games, crafts and haunted mazes.

== Student organizations and interest groups ==
=== American Medical Association – Medical Student Section, EVMS Chapter (AMA) ===
The American Medical Association-MSS is dedicated to representing medical students, improving medical education, developing leadership, and promoting activism for the health of America.

=== American Medical Student Association (AMSA) ===
The American Medical Student Association (AMSA), with more than a half-century history of medical student activism, is the oldest and largest independent association of physicians-in-training in the United States. Founded in 1950, AMSA is a student-governed, non-profit organization committed to representing the concerns of physicians-in-training. AMSA began under the auspices of the American Medical Association (AMA) to provide medical students a chance to participate in organized medicine. Starting in 1960, the association refocused its energies on the problems of the medically underserved, inequities in our health-care system and related issues in medical education. Since 1968, AMSA has been a fully independent student organization. With approximately 50,000 members, including medical and premedical students, residents and practicing physicians, AMSA is committed to improving medical training as well as advancing the profession of medicine. AMSA focuses on four strategic priorities, including universal healthcare, disparities in medicine, diversity in medicine and transforming the culture of medical education. Today, AMSA continues its commitment to improving medical training and the nation's health.

=== EVMS Alliance ===
This student group was formed to bring together students and provide a safe and open space at EVMS to discuss LGBTQ issues, especially topics related to health care. Each year, the group does presentations for the other medical interest groups to help bring LGBTQ awareness to other students as they pursue their medical school training.

== Economic impact ==
In a 2007 study conducted by Old Dominion University, EVMS was found to not only be important for the region's physical health, but also among the greatest economic influences on the region. The study found the following:

- EVMS' imprint on the regional economy is $711 million annually.
- EVMS is among the 25 largest non-federal employers in Hampton Roads (1,386 full-time employees).
- EVMS provides $40.5 million in uncollected medical care, which would otherwise be passed on to area hospitals/agencies.
- $66.6 million annually is kept in the local economy that would be spent on travel for healthcare, if it had not been available at EVMS.
- EVMS generates approximately $40 million in external research funding each year, a substantial source of outside revenue to the local economy.
- One in four physicians in the region has a tie to EVMS.

== Notable faculty and alumni ==
=== Faculty ===
- Mason Andrews – Virginia politician and physician who delivered America's first in vitro baby; ex-president of the American Gynecological and Obstetrical Society
- L.D. Britt – president of the American College of Surgeons, member of the National Academy of Medicine
- Arthur Evans (rower) – Olympic rower, faculty member
- Georgeanna Seegar Jones – founder, Jones Institute for Reproductive Medicine at EVMS, pioneer in IVF
- Howard W. Jones – co-founder, Jones Institute for Reproductive Medicine at EVMS, pioneer in IVF
- Paul E. Marik – developer of the sepsis treatment protocol "HAT"
- Aaron I. Vinik – endocrinologist and physician-scientist; professor of internal medicine, Murray Waitzer Endowed Chair in Diabetes Research, and Director of Research at the EVMS Strelitz Diabetes Center
- Kurt A McCammon – chair, Genitourinary Reconstructive Surgery at EVMS, Chairman, Department of Urology

=== Alumni ===
- Chris Adrian (Class of 2001) – novelist, short story author
- David McDowell Brown (Class of 1982) – astronaut killed on Columbia Space Shuttle
- Yvonne Cagle (Class of 1992) – professor, retired USAF colonel, and former NASA astronaut
- Siobhan Dunnavant (Class of 1999) – politician and physician
- Ivan Edwards (Class of 2005) – ex-pastor, USAF flight surgeon, community activist, humanitarian
- Sanjay Gulati (Class of 1988) – child psychiatrist, researcher in the field of deafness
- Richard Lewandowski (Class of 1995, Fellow) – plastic/reconstructive surgeon, performs reconstructive surgeries on patients with facial deformities; founder of Australia Operation Smile
- Ralph S. Northam (Class of 1984) – Governor of Virginia, former Lt Governor, and state senator; pediatric neurologist
- Nabeel Qureshi (Class of 2009) – Christian apologist and author
