= Kurt A. McCammon =

American urologist

- Born: Toledo, Ohio, USA
- Education: University of Toledo, BA, Medical College of Ohio, MD
- Occupation: Reconstructive Urologist
- Years active: 1999- present
- Medical career
- Research: Urethral strictures, male and female urinary incontinence, erectile dysfunction, genital reconstruction

Kurt Allen McCammon is an American urologist who is a professor and the Devine Chair in Genitourinary Reconstructive Surgery at Eastern Virginia Medical School, where he has served as the Chairman for the Department of Urology since 2011, Program Director of the Department of Urology since 2006, and Fellowship Director for the Adult and Pediatric Genitourinary Reconstructive Surgery since 2010. He is the past president of the Society of Genitourinary Reconstructive Surgeons, on the board of the International Volunteers in Urology, and a member of the American Urological Association Board of Directors. McCammon surgically addresses urethral stricture disease, male urinary incontinence, erectile dysfunction, female urinary incontinence, genital abnormalities, and other genitourinary issues.

== Biography ==
Born in Toledo, Ohio, McCammon obtained his B.A. in biology from the University of Toledo in 1988. After He proceeded to the Medical College of Ohio where he met his wife, Carol McCammon. He matched for a surgical internship and Urology residency in Norfolk, Virginia, at Eastern Virginia Medical School. During residency, he was the recipient of the Intern of the Year, Upjohn Award in 1993. After graduating residency, he pursued further training in the Adult and Pediatric Genitourinary Reconstructive Surgery Fellowship at Eastern Virginia Medical School.

Remaining at Eastern Virginia Medical School as part of Urology of Virginia, McCammon became Program Director for the Department of Urology, Fellowship Director for the Adult and Pediatric Genitourinary Reconstructive Surgery Fellowship, and eventually Chairman of the Department of Urology. He was introduced to International Volunteers in Urology after participating in a mission trip to Jos, Nigeria in 2004. He serves on the Board for International Volunteers in Urology since 2016 and has helped foster a relationship with Caldera to improve global care for women with pelvic organ prolapse. Through training local Urologists to perform urethral reconstructions in Senegal, the success rates of urethral reconstructions have doubled.

McCammon and his wife started a high school summer science program, the Health Sciences Academy, with Easter Virginia Medical School to offer exposure to the health sciences to students of diverse socioeconomic backgrounds. 2019 was the inaugural year, and there are plans to expand it to include neighboring school districts in the future.

=== Articles ===
McCammon is the author of more than 50 peer reviewed articles.

=== Scientific trials ===
McCammon has participated in the conduct of numerous clinical trials including, most recently, trials with Allergan for the use of onabotulinum toxin A for overactive bladder.
