= University of Virginia Health System =

Coordinates: 38°1′56.3″N 78°29′55″W

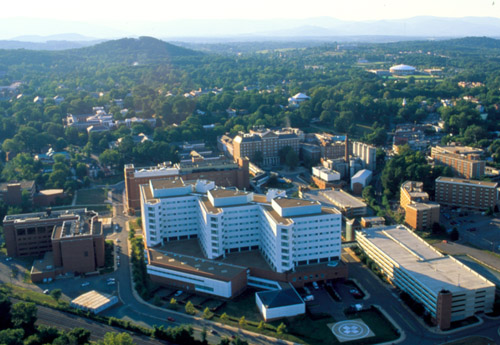
- Aerial view of UVA Health System campus in Charlottesville, Virginia.

Geography
- Location: Charlottesville, Virginia, United States

Organization
- Care system: Public
- Type: Teaching
- Affiliated university: University of Virginia School of Medicine

Services
- Emergency department: Level I trauma center
- Beds: 645

Helipads
- Helipad: ground and rooftop

History
- Founded: 1901

Links
- Website: uvahealth.com
- Lists: Hospitals in Virginia

The University of Virginia (UVA) Health System is an academic health care center associated with the University of Virginia in Charlottesville. The health system includes a medical center (with main hospital, children's hospital, and clinic network), school of medicine, school of nursing, and health sciences library. The health system provides inpatient and outpatient care and patient education and conducts medical research and education.

Based in Charlottesville, the Health System also operates satellite locations throughout Virginia, in Albemarle, Amherst, Augusta, Campbell, Fluvanna, Louisa, Nelson, and Orange counties.

The first medical degrees granted by UVA were awarded in 1828. The University of Virginia Hospital, designed by architect Paul J. Pelz, opened in 1901.

The UVA Health System's patient care, research and medical education are frequently ranked highly by several ranking systems. In 2016 and 2017, U.S. News & World Report ranked UVAHS as the number one hospital in Virginia.

== History ==
The UVA Health System's history can be traced to the founding of the University of Virginia in 1819. At the first meeting of the university's Board of Visitors in 1819, a School of Medicine was authorized. The University of Virginia School of Medicine – the 10th medical school in the U.S. – officially opened in March 1825 with a single professor, Dr. Robley Dunglison, recruited by Thomas Jefferson to UVA from London.

More than 75 years later, UVA opened its first hospital in March 1901 with 25 beds and three operating rooms. A few months later, the hospital established a training program for nurses, which would grow into the UVA School of Nursing, formally established in 1956.

Until 1960, the UVA Hospital served its African American patients in segregated wards located in the hospital's basement level. Local African American activists, including hospital employees such as Randolph Lewis White, worked with the NAACP to advocate both for desegregated wards and better labor conditions for the hospital's African American staff members. White and others lobbied state and local officials, and eventually threatened a hospital worker's strike, and then a lawsuit, eventually succeeding in having black patients fully integrated into the previously all-white wards.

The 8,000 books purchased by Jefferson to create the University Library included 710 books on the medical sciences. UVA's medical literature moved to the Medical School building in 1929. Its current home was dedicated in April 1976. The UVA Health Services Foundation was founded in 1979 to handle billing as well as provide benefits and administrative support to UVA physicians. It was renamed University Physicians Group in 2011.

In 2012, Virginia Commonwealth University's School of Pharmacy opened a satellite location at the University of Virginia Medical Center.

In August 2013, with a change in the leadership structure, Dr. Richard Patrick Shannon joined the University of Virginia as the Executive Vice President for Health Affairs. He oversaw the entire Health System at UVA and reported directly to the UVA president. Dr. Shannon formally announced his resignation to the employees of the hospital on March 4, 2019.

== Components ==
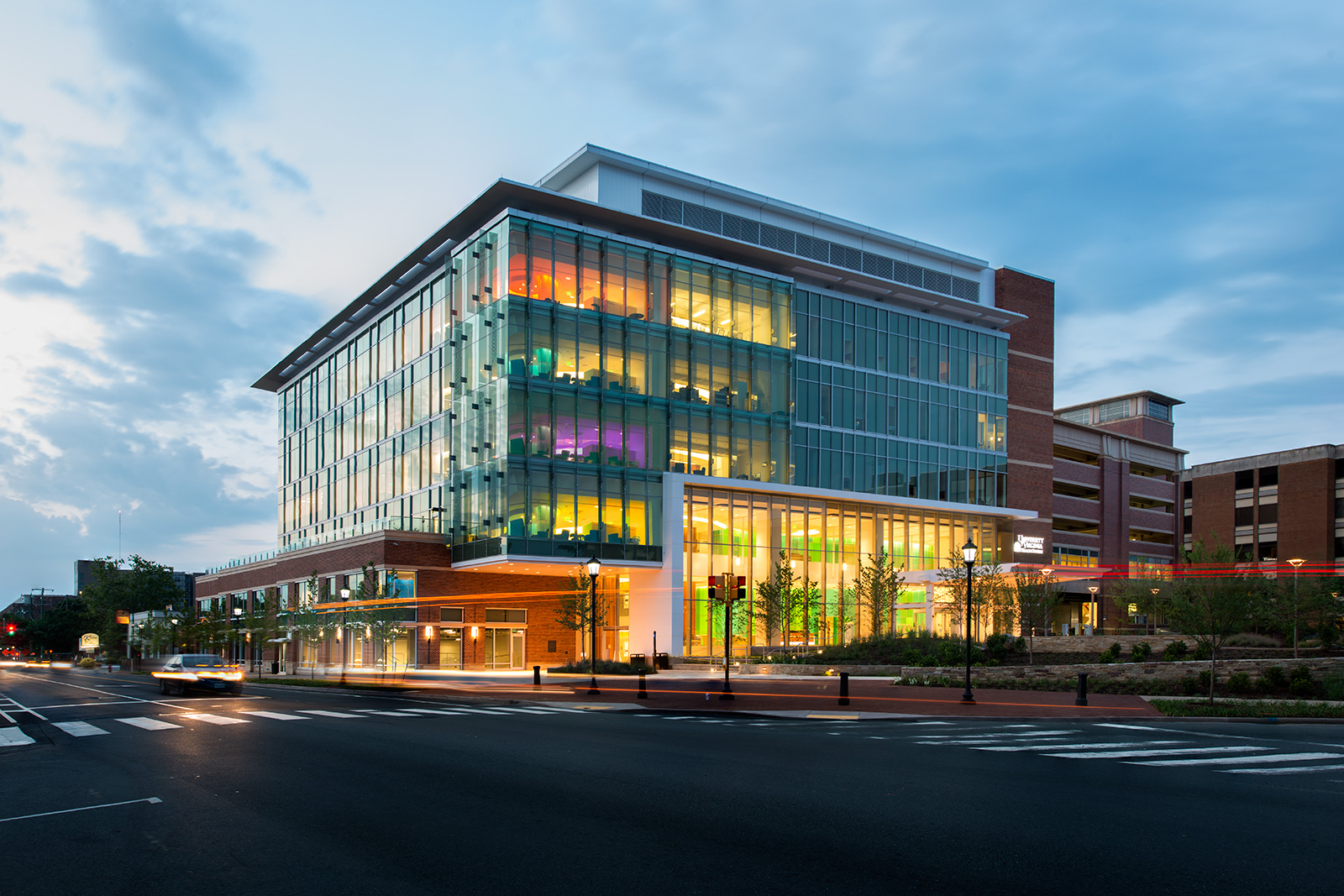
The Battle Building of the UVA children's hospital.

The University of Virginia Health System consists of five components:

- The University of Virginia Medical Center provides primary, specialty and emergency care throughout Central Virginia through a network of clinics as well as a main hospital that has 701 inpatient beds, not including a 71-bed Level 4 neonatal intensive care unit and 20-bed nursery. The Children's Hospital is served by the Newborn Emergency Transport System, which transports critically ill newborns and pediatrics from the surrounding area to UVA. The hospital is a Level I trauma center and is accessible by ambulance as well as Pegasus, UVA Health System's air and ground transport service for critically ill and injured patients. As an academic medical center, patients at UVA are treated by physicians who are also faculty members at the UVA School of Medicine. In the 2015 fiscal year, the UVA Medical Center treated 27,920 inpatients and had a total of 875,414 outpatient visits, and 60,646 patients seen in the ER.
- The University of Virginia School of Medicine has more than 1,000 faculty members who perform three main tasks: provide care to patients at the UVA Medical Center, educate medical students and residents and perform scientific medical research that may lead to improved care for patients at UVA and elsewhere. Leading research areas include cancer, cardiovascular disease, neurodegenerative diseases and vaccine development. The Dean of the School of Medicine as of September 15, 2021, is Melina R. Kibbe, MD.
- The University of Virginia School of Nursing has 94 faculty members who educate student nurses and perform research that will improve patient care at UVA and elsewhere. Leading research areas include rural healthcare, the history of nursing, complementary and alternative therapies, geriatrics and oncology.
- The Claude Moore Health Sciences Library provides access to printed and online medical information, medical news and the history of healthcare to faculty, students and staff as well as the public.
- The University Physicians Group is the physician group practice that processes billing for UVA physician services.

=== Facilities ===
The Medical Center consists of several buildings. The largest of these building include the main hospital, the West Complex, and the Battle Building.

The main hospital was completed in 1989 at a cost of more than $230 million. Originally designed to be six floors, it now stands at 8 floors tall. The building was expanded in 2004, 2012, and 2019. The West Complex was built as a series of separate buildings from 1901 to 1960, with major construction occurring in the 1930s and 1960s. These buildings have since been connected through a series of additions, although the names of the separate buildings are often used. The Battle Building, named for Barry and Bill Battle, was dedicated in 2014 and houses pediatric patient care and outpatient surgery. At over 200,000 sq ft and seven floors, there are 12 operating rooms in this building and a clinical trials wing. The Battle Building has a LEED Gold rating. The Emily Couric Clinical Cancer Center opened in 2011 across from the main hospital.

Medical and nursing students are educated in the Claude Moore Nursing Education Building, built in 2008, and the Claude Moore Medical Education Building, opened in 2010. Several research buildings are on the grounds of the Medical Center where basic, clinical, and translational research is done including Pinn Hall, MR-4, MR-5, MR-6, and the West Complex. Fontaine Research Park is located off-site.

Other major locations are the Jefferson Park Medical Office, Northridge Medical Park, Fontaine Research Park, UVA Family Medicine and Specialty Care of Crozet, Zion Crossroads Medical Park and the Transitional Care Hospital.

=== UVA Children's Hospital ===
UVA Children's Hospital is a nationally ranked, acute care children's hospital in Charlottesville, Virginia. It is affiliated with the University of Virginia School of Medicine. The hospital features private and shared rooms, and contains 106 pediatric beds. The hospital provides comprehensive pediatric specialties and subspecialties to infants, children, teens, and young adults aged 0–21 throughout the region. The hospital also sometimes treats adults that require pediatric care. The hospital has a rooftop helipad to transport critical pediatric cases. The hospital features a regional pediatric intensive-care unit and an American Academy of Pediatrics verified level IV neonatal intensive care unit.

=== Novant Health UVA Health System ===
In January 2016, University of Virginia Health System and North Carolina–based Novant Health formed a joint operating company to merge several facilities in Northern Virginia. Novant Health UVA Health System comprises UVA Health System Culpeper Hospital, Novant Health Haymarket Medical Center and Novant Health Prince William Medical Center, as well as additional facilities from Novant Health including assisted living, outpatient cancer care, and ambulatory physician clinics. On July 1, 2021, University of Virginia Health System completed the purchase of Novant Health UVA Health System and its hospitals in Culpeper, Manassas and Haymarket.

== Maternity ward baby mix-up ==
On June 30, 1995, the University Medical Center accidentally interchanged two newborns in its maternity ward causing them to be sent home with wrong parents. This was not discovered until the summer of 1998 when DNA paternity test was ordered when one of the child's parents were going through a divorce. Custody battles ensued and the children ended up being raised not with their biological family, but with the incorrect family they were handed to by the hospital. The University and one of the families agreed to settle in April 2001 with the university paying $2.3 million to the family.

== Awards ==
=== U.S. News & World Report ===
Several UVA Medical Center departments are ranked among the top 50 in the nation by U.S. News & World Report. These are the departments that made the magazine's 2017 rankings:

Department	National ranking	Most recent year
Cancer	30	2017
Cardiology & Heart Surgery	50	2017
Otolaryngology	33	2017
Neurology and Neurosurgery	29	2015
Urology	35	2017
Orthopedics	33	2017
Nephrology	46	2015
Peds: Cardiology & Heart Surgery	44	2017
Neonatology	30	2017
Peds: Orthopedics	41	2017

UVA's School of Medicine and School of Nursing have also been highly ranked by U.S. News & World Report. In the 2017 rankings, the School of Medicine was ranked 27th among medical schools for research and 24th among medical schools for primary care.

The School of Nursing's master's degree program was ranked 19th in 2007 by U.S. News & World Report, while the magazine ranked two of the school's specialty programs in the top 10. The School of Nursing's Clinical Health Specialist program in psychiatric/mental health ranked 5th, while its Clinical Health Specialist program in adult/medical-surgical ranked 6th.

=== Becker's Hospital Review ===
In 2016, Becker's Hospital Review ranked UVA 30 in the nation for Orthopedic Surgery.

=== Thomson Reuters 100 Top Hospitals ===
On March 30, 2009, the UVA medical center was named as one of the top 100 hospitals in America for 2008 by the Thomson Reuters. The index is based upon clinical excellence, operating efficiency and financial health, and patient satisfaction using criteria such as risk-adjusted mortality index, risk-adjusted complications index and risk-adjusted patient safety index.

=== Individual awards ===
Dr. Thomas A.E. Platts-Mills, FRS is the head of the Division of Allergy and Clinical Immunology. In 2010, Dr. Platts-Mills was elected as a Fellow of The Royal Society, the first allergist to be named to this select group.

== Notable deaths ==
- Manute Bol
- Gerry Bertier
- Sean Piche, founder of Fur Affinity
