= L. D. Britt =

American physician and academic

Lunzy Delano Britt
- Born: Date Unknown; Suffolk, Virginia
- Citizenship: American
- Education: Harvard University; University of Virginia
- Known for: First African American in America to have an endowed chair in surgery
- Scientific career
- Fields: General Surgery
- Workplaces: Eastern Virginia Medical School

Lunzy Delano "L. D." Britt FACS, FCCM is an American physician and is the Brickhouse Professor of Surgery at the Eastern Virginia Medical School, former President of the American College of Surgeons, and former President of the Southern Surgical Association. Britt was the first African American in the United States to receive an endowed chair in surgery at a major American medical school.

Britt was born in Suffolk, Virginia and graduated from Booker T. Washington High School as his class's valedictorian. He attended the University of Virginia, where he received his BA and became a member of the Raven Society. He then went on to receive degrees from Harvard Medical School and the Harvard School of Public Health.

Britt was President of the American College of Surgeons and served the October 2010-October 2011 term.

Britt attained the level of Master Trauma Surgeon in 1995.
