= Mary McCammon =

British mathematician (1927–2008)

Mary Lister McCammon
- Born: Mary Lister; August 23, 1927
- Died: April 11, 2008 (aged 80)
- Education: University of London (BSc, MSc); Imperial College London (PhD)
- Scientific career
- Fields: Mathematics
- Workplaces: Pennsylvania State University; Massachusetts Institute of Technology
- Thesis: The relaxation method applied to the solution of problems of viscous flow (1953)
- Doctoral advisor: D. N. de G. Allen

Mary Lister McCammon (23 August 1927 – 11 April 2008) was a British mathematician and professor at Pennsylvania State University. She was the first woman to complete a doctoral degree in mathematics at Imperial College London, which she did in 1953.

== Early life and education ==
McCammon studied mathematics at the University of London, graduating with a bachelor's degree in 1949 and a master's in 1950. She was the first woman to earn a PhD in mathematics at Imperial College London gaining her doctorate in 1953 for her work on mathematical models of viscous flow supervised by D. N. de G. Allen.

== Career and research ==
She joined Massachusetts Institute of Technology for postdoctoral research. McCammon joined Pennsylvania State University in 1954. She introduced classes in numerical analysis, calculus and computer programming. She served as director for undergraduate studies twice, first between 1963 and 1975, and again from 1988 to 1998. McCammon was promoted to Professor in 1992. She created the first mathematics placement test, which were given to all freshmen.

== Awards and honours ==
- 1982 Christian Mary Lindback Award for Distinguished Teaching
- 1984 Teresa Cohen Service Award
- 1991 Eberly College of Science Distinguished Service Award
- 1998 C.I. Knoll Award for Excellence in Teaching

In 2000, Pennsylvania State University announced the Mary Lister McCammon Award, a scholarship for undergraduate studies, as well as the McCammon Award for Distinguished Undergraduate Teaching named in her honour. In 2019, Imperial College London announced the Mary Lister McCammon Summer Research Fellowship for undergraduate women mathematicians.
