= Samuel McCammon House =

Historic house in Tennessee, United States

- U.S. National Register of Historic Places
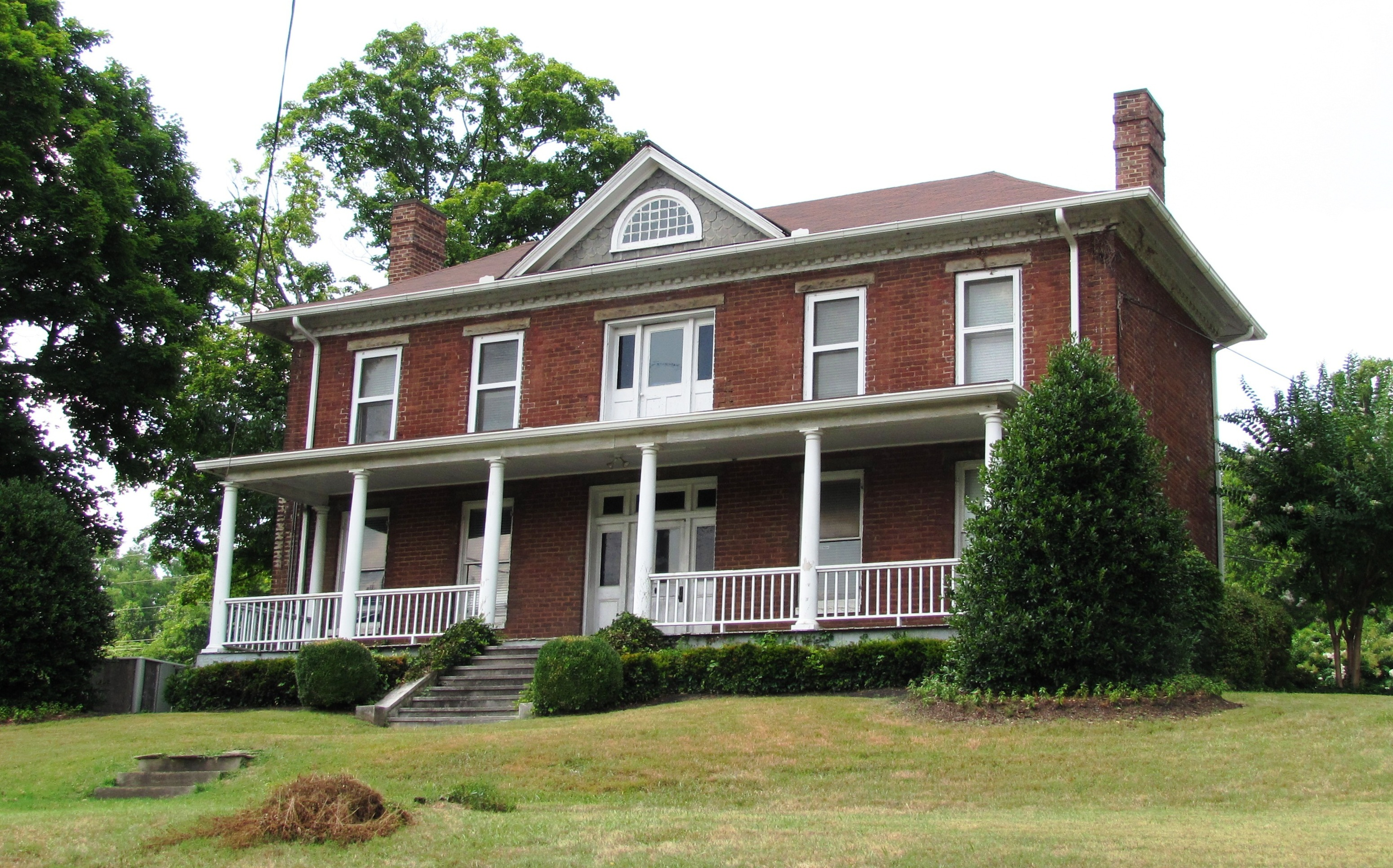
- Location: 1715 Riverside Dr; Knoxville, Tennessee
- Coordinates: 35°57′55″N 83°53′51″W
- Built: 1849
- Architect: T. Haynes
- Architectural style: Federal
- NRHP reference No.: 84003571
- Added to NRHP: March 1, 1984

The Samuel McCammon House, also known as James White's House Site, is a historic house at 1715 Riverside Drive in Knoxville, Tennessee, United States. It is on the National Register of Historic Places.

The two-story brick house was built circa 1849–1851 by Samuel McCammon, a farmer, and designed in the Federal style by T. Haynes. Its site also contains one of the homes of James White, the founder of Knoxville. It was listed on the National Register of Historic Places in 1984. It currently houses the offices of Engert Plumbing and Heating.
