= Georgeanna Seegar Jones =

American gynecologist

- Born: July 6, 1912; Baltimore, Maryland
- Died: March 26, 2005 (aged 92)
- Education: Goucher College (B.A.); Johns Hopkins University (M.D.)
- Known for: Pioneering in-vitro fertilization
- Scientific career
- Fields: Endocrinology; Gynecology; Obstetrics
- Workplaces: Johns Hopkins University

Georgeanna Seegar Jones (July 6, 1912 – March 26, 2005) was an American reproductive endocrinologist who with her husband, Howard W. Jones, pioneered in vitro fertilization in the United States.

== Early life ==
She was born July 6, 1912, in Baltimore, Maryland, to J. King Seegar. Her father was a obstetrician, one of the many things that led to Seegar Jones's interest in medicine from a young age. She was raised along with two siblings. She received her bachelor's degree in 1932 from Goucher College and continued to pursue her medical career at Johns Hopkins University School of Medicine. Four years later, in 1936, she got her official medical degree (MD). She completed her training as a house gynecology officer and an acting member of the National Cancer Institute. While attending medical school she met her husband, Howard W. Jones, Jr., whom she married in 1940. Reproductive endocrinology was not yet a subspecialty; in fact, she and her husband's accomplishments have contributed to the successful reproductive endocrinology programs that are offered at Johns Hopkins.

== Career ==
As a resident at Johns Hopkins, she discovered that the common pregnancy hormone, human chorionic gonadotropin, hCG was produced by the placenta, not the pituitary gland as originally thought. Thus leading to the development of the hCG pregnancy test that are currently on the market. By the late 1940s, Jones had a copious amount of experience with studying infertility in couples, using endocrinological techniques. At this time, there was no substantial research on endocrinology and the link to infertility so Jones submitted an article of her findings to the American Medical Association titled "Some Newer Aspects of the Management of Infertility". Within this article was the advancements she has made studying the luteal phase defect, a term which Jones is responsible for. In 1949, Jones made the first description of Luteal Phase Dysfunction, and is credited to be the first in using progesterone to treat women with a history of miscarriages, thus allowing many of them to not only conceive, but to deliver healthy babies. The pregnanediol technique was developed by Jones along with other Hopkins members. Conclusions drawn from her individual research showed that low progesterone levels lead to low preganediol levels and provide a greater risk for infertility.

She became the director of Johns Hopkins' Laboratory of Reproductive Physiology and was the Gynecologist-in-Charge of the hospital's gynecologic endocrinology clinic in 1939. She married Howard W. Jones while at Johns Hopkins and they had three children.

== Later life ==
In 1969, Seegar Jones began to identify and examine what is now known as ovarian resistance syndrome. She demonstrated that stimulation of menopausal gonadotropin leads to the increase in number of eggs that are available and viable for vitro fertilization. In 1978, the same year that UK scientists were successful with in vitro fertilization, the Joneses took an opportunity from EVMS and moved to Norfolk, Virginia to create an IVF program in the United States. This was after the birth of the first test tube baby in the world, Louise Joy Brown, on July 25, 1978, in England. The Joneses created their own IVF program at EVMS. On December 28, 1981, their procedure gave birth to Elizabeth Jordan Carr, the first American test tube baby.

She developed Alzheimer's disease in the late 1990s. Jones died on March 26, 2005, in Portsmouth, Virginia.

== Awards ==
Dr. Seegar Jones was awarded the Distinguished Service Award Medal from the Cosmopolitan Club of Norfolk in 1988 for the advancements she made to in vitro fertilization. She is also a recipient of the Dean's Outstanding Faculty Award from Eastern Virginia Medical School, 1996; and in 1997, the Distinguished Alumnus Award from Johns Hopkins University, also for her contributions to reproductive endocrinology and success she made with IVF. In 2000 she received the Distinguished Scientist Award from the Gynecologic Investigation.

She was one of the first in her field to train medical students, residents and fellows for several schools. Many of her students went on to make contributions to academic medicine themselves. In 1979, Dr. Seegar Jones was the first woman to be named President of the American Fertility Society. On September 24, 2026 she is being inducted into the National Women's Hall of Fame (located in Seneca Falls, New York).
