= Children's Hospital of The King's Daughters =

Hospital in Virginia, US

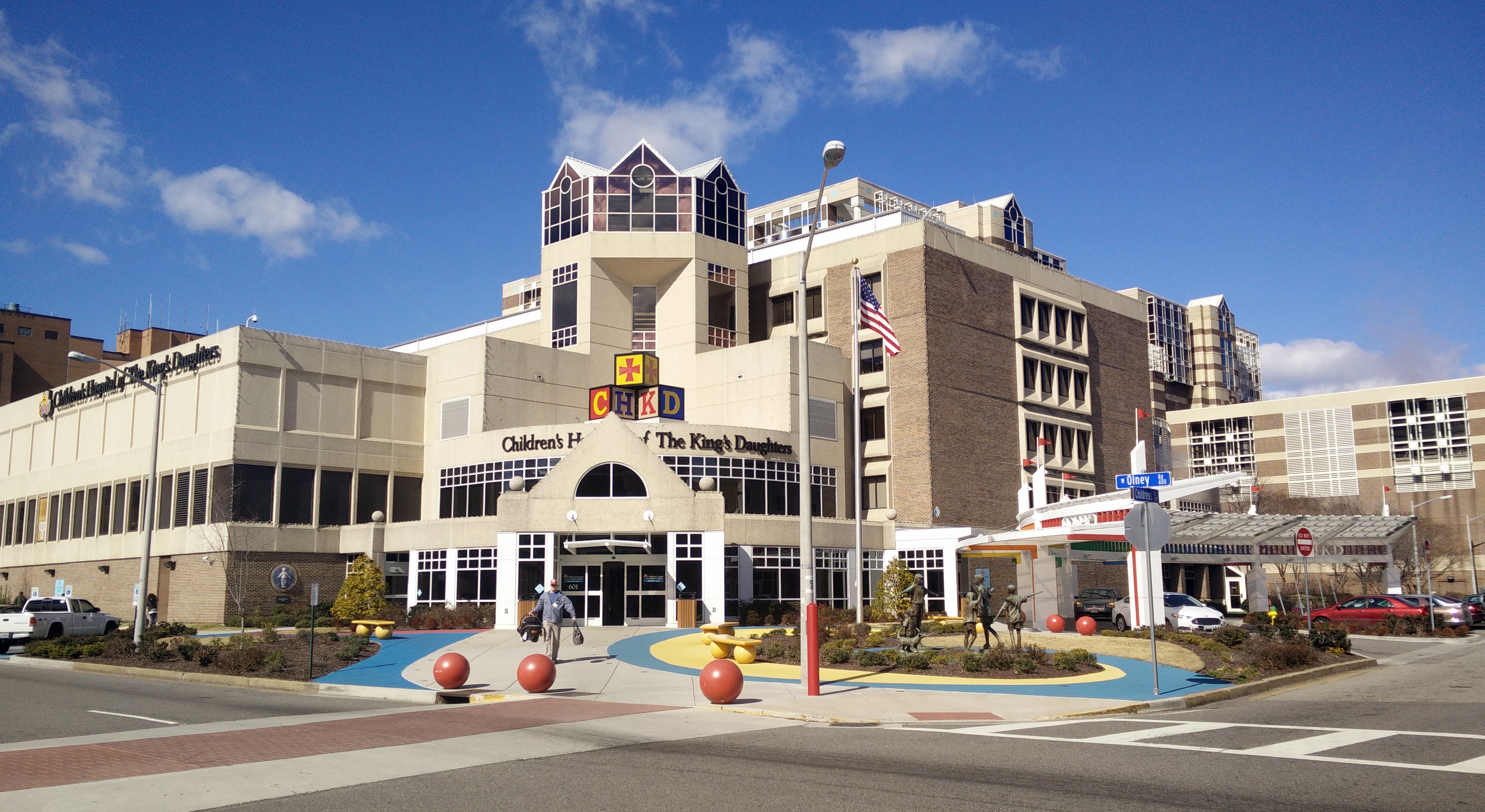

Geography
- Location: 601 Children's Lane, Norfolk, Virginia, United States
- Coordinates: 36°51′44.2″N 76°18′07.3″W

Organization
- Affiliated university: Eastern Virginia Medical School

Services
- Emergency department: Level I trauma center
- Beds: 206

History
- Founded: 1961

Links
- Website: CHKD website
- Lists: Hospitals in Virginia

Children's Hospital of The King's Daughters (CHKD), located in Norfolk, Virginia, United States, is the only freestanding children's hospitals in Virginia. The hospital treats infants, children, teens, and young adults aged 0–21 and even some adults who require pediatric care.

CHKD is a 206-bed hospital and serves the medical and surgical needs of children throughout the greater Hampton Roads metro area, the Eastern Shore of Virginia and northeastern North Carolina. It is also part of CHKD Health System, offering a network of comprehensive pediatric services in more than 40 locations that stretch from Williamsburg, VA, to Elizabeth City, NC.

On the outpatient side, CHKD offers primary care, diagnostic services, urgent care, emergency care, rehabilitative therapies, day surgery and care in more than 20 pediatric subspecialties.

== History ==
In 1896, a group of Christian women formed the Norfolk City Union of The King's Daughters to provide medical care for indigent mothers and their children. They established a free clinic and visiting nurse service and in 1961 built The King's Daughters' Children's Hospital, with 88 beds and a variety of services. In 1979, the name was changed to Children's Hospital of The King's Daughters.

In the 1980s, CHKD surgeon Donald Nuss developed a procedure to correct pectus excavatum, and CHKD remains a leading center for the Nuss procedure.

The CHKD hospital campus sits in southwest Norfolk, adjacent to Sentara Norfolk General Hospital and Eastern Virginia Medical School. CHKD serves as the main pediatric training location for EVMS students, and along with EVMS, sponsors an ACGME-accredited pediatric residency training program.

Today, the CHKD Health System operates primary care pediatric practices, surgical practices, urgent care centers, multi-service Health Centers and satellite offices throughout its service region. It also hosts the only donor human milk bank in Virginia.

In 2017 UVA Children's Hospital partnered with Children's Hospital of The King's Daughters to improve care for children throughout the region.

In 2018, CHKD earned a full Level I Pediatric Trauma Center status. "CHKD earned provisional status as a Level I Pediatric Trauma Center in September of 2017. In July 2018, a multidisciplinary Health Department team conducted a follow-up site visit to verify the hospital's adherence to Virginia trauma center standards. During the provisional period, CHKD's trauma team cared for almost 600 trauma patients. The follow-up site visit resulted in unanimous recommendation for approval from all reviewers."

In response to community assessment surveys that showed mental health services for children to be a top priority, the hospital began a multimillion-dollar initiative to expand mental health services for children. In 2019, the hospital system broke ground for a $224 million mental health facility that will have 60 inpatient beds, indoor and outdoor exercise areas, and rooms for outpatient services and a "partial hospitalization" program. The 14-story center will be on the same campus as the main hospital at 601 Children's Lane in Norfolk.

== Gallery ==
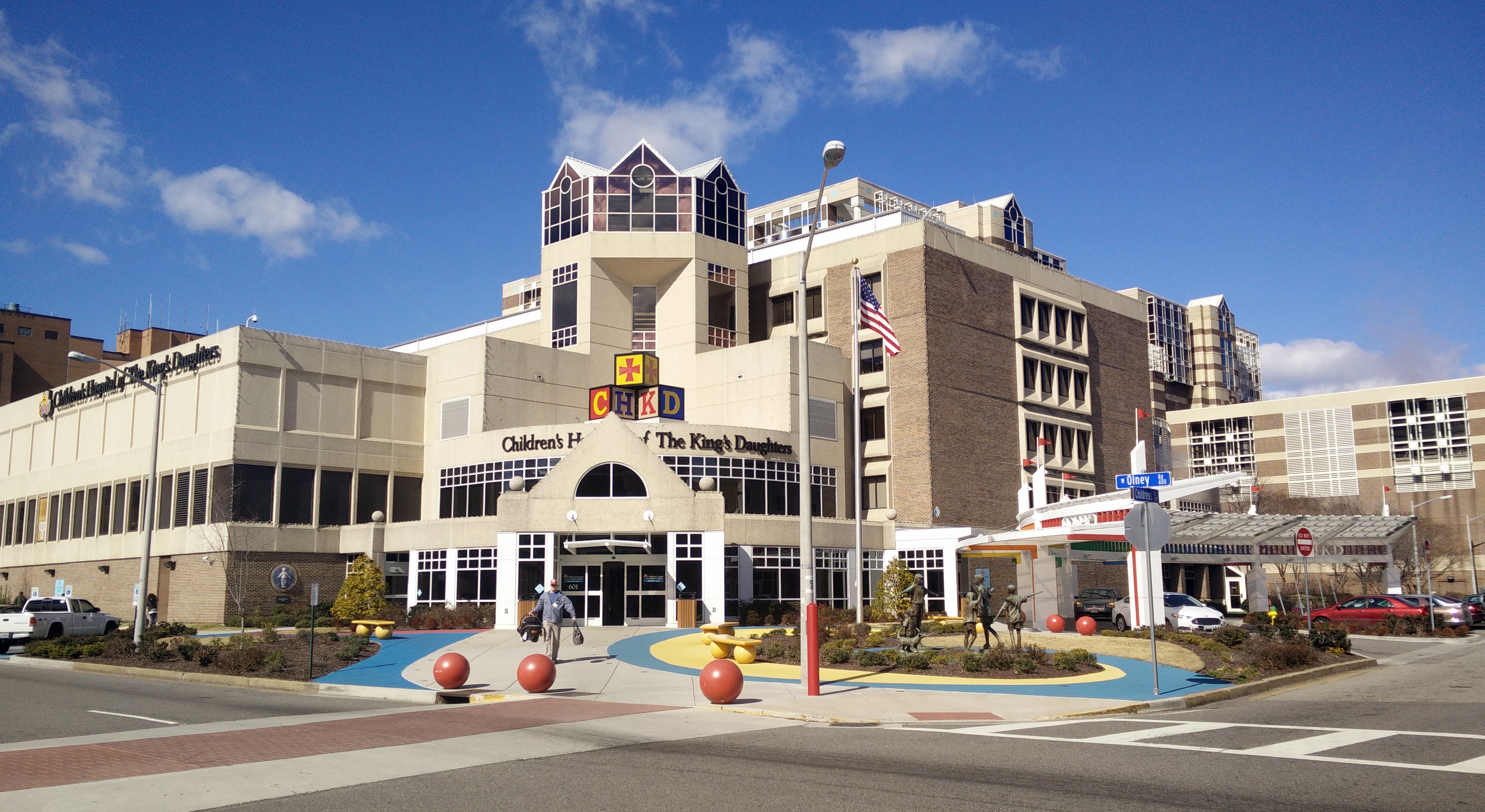
Front entrance

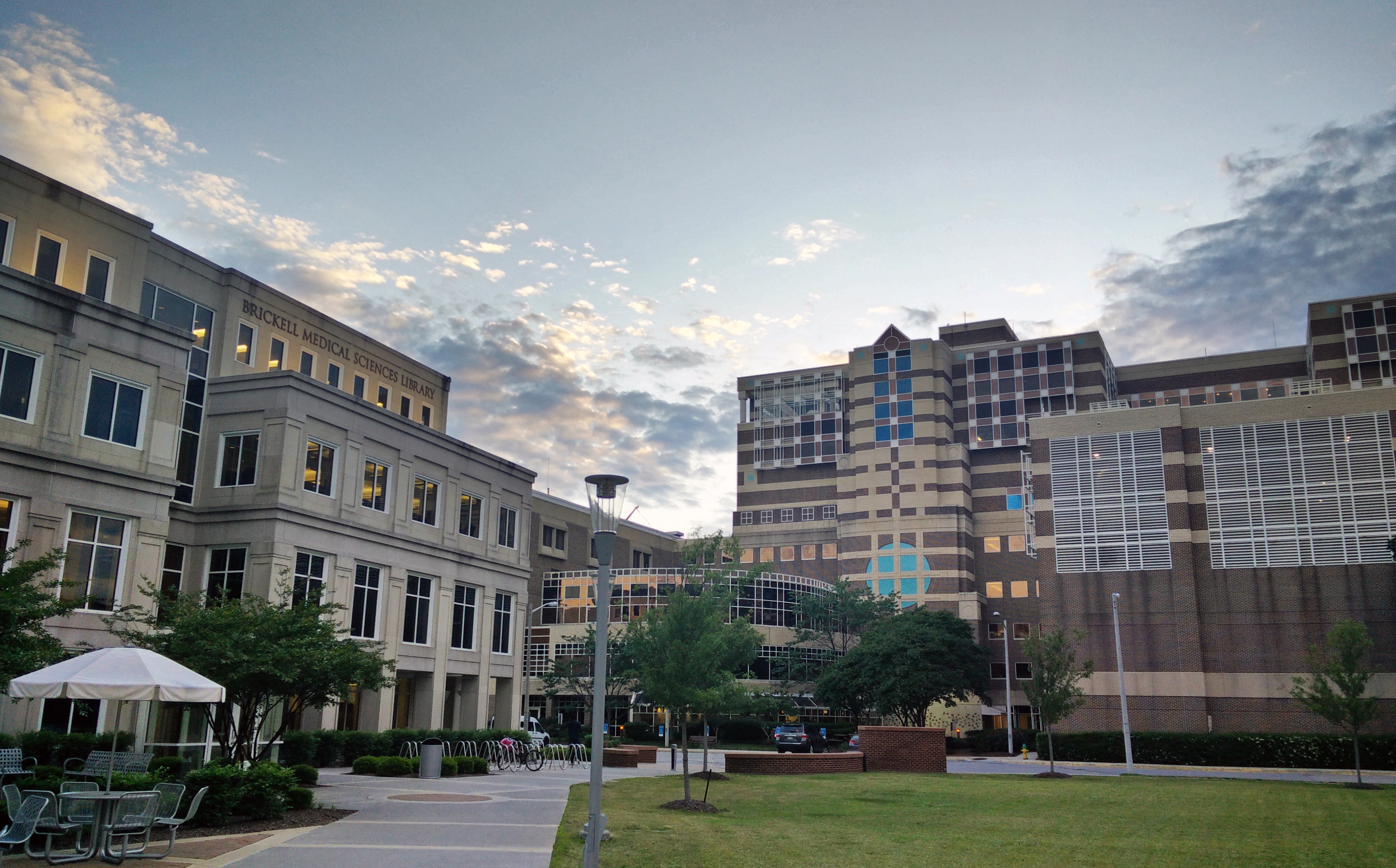
Side view from EVMS campus
