= Bon Secour =

Bon Secour, Bon Secours, or Bonsecours (French for "good help") may refer to:

== Places ==
=== Canada ===
==== Quebec ====
- Bonsecours, Quebec
- Bonsecours Market, opened 1847 near the Notre-Dame-de-Bon-Secours Chapel in Montreal

=== Ireland ===
- Bon Secours Hospital, Cork, a private hospital in County Cork; part of the Bon Secours Health System
- Bon Secours Hospital, Dublin, a private hospital in Glasnevin, Dublin; part of the Bon Secours Health System
- Bon Secours Hospital, Galway, a private hospital in County Galway; part of the Bon Secours Health System
- Bon Secours Hospital, Tralee, a private hospital in County Kerry; part of the Bon Secours Health System
- Bon Secours Mother and Baby home, Tuam, a home for unmarried mothers and their children that became the focus of a scandal in 2014

=== United States of America ===
- Bon Secour, Alabama, a small town near southeast Mobile Bay
- Bon Secour National Wildlife Refuge, a set of 5 wildlife areas along the Alabama Gulf Coast
- Bon Secours Wellness Arena, a multipurpose arena in Greenville, South Carolina

==== Virginia ====
- Bon Secours Mary Immaculate Hospital, a hospital in Virginia
- Bon Secours DePaul Medical Center, a hospital in Norfolk, Virginia
- Bon Secours Maryview Medical Center, a hospital in Portsmouth, Virginia
- Bon Secours Memorial Regional Medical Center, a hospital in Virginia
- Bon Secours Richmond Community Hospital, a hospital in Virginia
- Bon Secours St. Francis Medical Center, a hospital in Virginia
- Bon Secours St. Mary's Hospital, a hospital in Richmond, Virginia

=== Other places ===
- Bon-Secours, a village in the municipality of Péruwelz, Hainaut province, Belgium
- Bonsecours, a commune in Normandy region, France

== Groups, organizations ==
- Bon Secours Sisters, a Catholic charity group
- Bon Secours Health System, the largest private hospital network in the Republic of Ireland
- Bon Secours Health System (US), a Maryland-based Catholic healthcare system in the U.S.

== See also ==
- Notre Dame de Bon Secours (disambiguation)
- Bon (disambiguation)
- Help (disambiguation) (French: Secour)
