= Bon Secours Mercy Health =

American health system

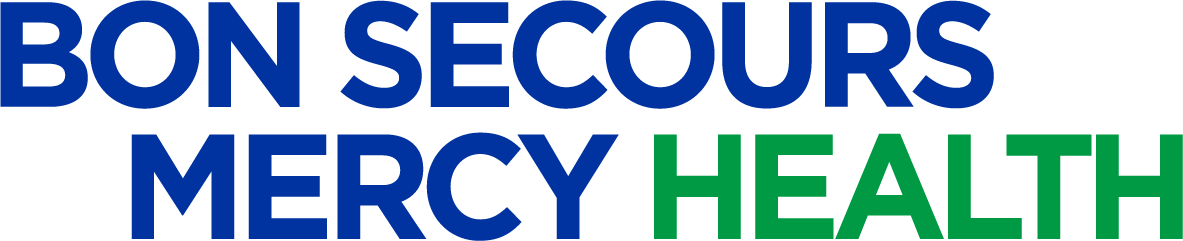
- Formation: September 2018; 8 years ago
- Type: Charitable organization
- Tax ID no.: 521301088
- Legal status: 501(c)(3)
- Purpose: Health care
- Location: Cincinnati, Ohio, United States
- Region served: United States and Ireland
- President and CEO: John M. Starcher, Jr
- Website: bsmhealth.org

Bon Secours Mercy Health is an American non-profit health care company with facilities and services in the United States, Ireland, the Philippines, Haiti, Peru and South Sudan. Headquartered in Cincinnati, Ohio, United States, it is the fifth largest Catholic health system in the United States and one of the country's 20 largest health systems. Bon Secours Mercy Health includes 51 hospitals and more than 1,200 sites of care. It is the largest private health care provider in Ireland.

== History ==
Bon Secours Mercy Health traces its roots to three founding sponsors, the Sisters of Bon Secours, the Sisters of Mercy and the Sisters of the Humility of Mary.

In 1858 the Sisters of the Humility of Mary was established in Dommartin-sous-Amance, France and came to the US at the invitation of Bishop Amadeus Rapp of Cleveland in 1864. The community grew, building schools and hospitals, serving parishes and meeting the needs of the poor.

In 1881, the Sisters of Bon Secours came to the United States from France to establish a health care ministry in Baltimore, Maryland. After years of providing home health, orphanages, day cares and other public services, the Sisters opened their first hospital in Baltimore in 1919.

Founded in 1931, the Sisters of Mercy arrived in the United States from Ireland at the invitation of the Bishop of Pittsburgh. They focused on caring for the sick and vulnerable, establishing hospitals throughout the United States.

In 2018, offshoots of these three organizations - the Marriottsville, Maryland-based Bon Secours Health System and the Cincinnati-based Mercy Health merged. At the time of the merger, Bon Secours Mercy Health comprised 43 hospitals in seven states and more than 2,100 physicians.

In April 2019, Bon Secours Mercy Health acquired Bon Secours Health System Ireland, creating a system with more than 60,000 employees.

== Operations ==
Bon Secours Mercy Health is a global health care company, operating non-profit health care facilities in Ireland and the United States under the brands Mercy Health, Bon Secours, Bon Secours Health System Ireland and a joint venture agreement with Roper St. Francis Healthcare.

Additionally, it owns and invests in a portfolio of related healthcare companies and maintains multiple long-term strategic partnerships.

In 2025, Bon Secours Mercy Health completed four investment deals to expand its portfolio. They involved AI startup Hyro, virtual care platform Hellocare, pricing data provider Trek Health and workforce solution Definity.

Also in 2025, BSMH expanded its presence in the Philippines with a global business center in Manila. The center provides strategic business resources and services to the global organization. The center is expected to help grow BSMH’s presence in the Philippines to more than 1,300 employees.

Credit rating agencies Fitch Ratings and Moody’s Investor Services provide Bon Secours Mercy Health with an AA rating and stable outlook. It holds the leading or secondary position in nine of its 11 markets.

=== Non-profit services ===
In the United States, Bon Secours Mercy Health manages 51 hospitals and more than 1,200 sites of care. It also operates colleges and universities including Bon Secours Memorial College of Nursing, Mercy College of Ohio, Southside College of Health Sciences and St. Mary’s School of Medical Imaging. Additional US non-profit initiatives include low-income housing, patient housing, hospice and senior care.

BSMH owns and operates five hospitals and multiple clinics throughout Ireland through Bon Secours Health System.

Through its Global Ministries program, BSMH provides healthcare in areas of critical need and assists individuals with getting access to healthcare through travel. BSMH runs programs throughout the world to help provide clean water, sanitation and hygiene to underserved and disrupted communities.

=== Related businesses ===
Bon Secours Mercy Health has established several health care companies with the intent to improve efficiency and care throughout the industry.

- Conduit Health Partners was founded by Bon Secours Mercy Health in 2018. It works with health systems, health plans, employers and other health care stakeholders to connect patients with healthcare. Led by a team of health care professionals, Conduit offers nurse triage and transfer center services to streamline resource allocation, enhance patient care and improve overall outcomes.
- Advantus Health Partners launched in 2021; it serves as a supply chain solutions organization for health care. Advantus customers include community hospitals, academic medical centers, regional delivery networks, national health systems, critical access hospitals, ambulatory surgery centers and physician clinics.
- Accrete Health Partners was founded in 2022 to develop, invest in and acquire innovative digital health products and services. Accrete's holdings include Nordic Consulting Group, Brado, Healthcare Highways and Truveta.
- Ensemble Health Partners has 3,600 employees and provides revenue managements services to the health care industry.
- Harness Health Partners provides employer health solutions and pharmacy services. Harness Health Pharmacy has more than 30 locations providing access to medication in Bon Secours and Mercy Health markets.
- Health Select Services is an accountable care organization specializing in building healthcare practice performance and improving healthcare outcomes.

=== Community Health Needs Assessments ===
Every three years, Bon Secours Mercy Health conducts Community Health Needs Assessments to understand the needs of each community it operates in. The resulting three-year implementation plans directly address the concerns and challenges of area residents.

== Hospitals ==
=== Cincinnati, Ohio ===
- Mercy Health — Anderson Hospital
- Mercy Health — Kings Mills Hospital
- Mercy Health — Clermont Hospital
- Mercy Health — Fairfield Hospital
- Mercy Health — West Hospital
- The Jewish Hospital — Mercy Health

=== Lima, Ohio ===
- Mercy Health — St. Rita's Medical Center

=== Lorain County, Ohio ===
- Mercy Health — Allen Hospital
- Mercy Health — Lorain Hospital

=== Springfield, Ohio ===
- Mercy Health — Urbana Hospital
- Mercy Health — Springfield Regional Medical Center

=== Toledo, Ohio ===
- Mercy Health — Defiance Hospital
- Mercy Health — Perrysburg Hospital
- Mercy Health — St. Anne Hospital
- Mercy Health — St. Charles Hospital
- Mercy Health — St. Vincent Medical Center
- Mercy Health — Tiffin Hospital
- Mercy Health — Willard Hospital

=== Youngstown, Ohio ===
- Mercy Health — St. Elizabeth Boardman Hospital
- Mercy Health — St. Elizabeth Youngstown Hospital
- Mercy Health — St. Joseph Warren Hospital

=== Irvine, Kentucky ===
- Mercy Health — Marcum and Wallace Hospital

=== Paducah, Kentucky ===
- Mercy Health — Lourdes Hospital

=== South Carolina ===
- Bon Secours St. Francis Downtown Hospital, Greenville
- Bon Secours St. Francis Eastside Hospital, Greenville
- Roper St. Francis Berkeley Hospital
- Roper St. Francis Mount Pleasant Hospital
- Bon Secours St. Francis Hospital in Charleston, SC

=== Virginia ===
- Bon Secours Harbour View Medical Center
- Bon Secours Mary Immaculate Hospital
- Bon Secours Maryview Medical Center
- Bon Secours Memorial Regional Medical Center
- Bon Secours Rappahannock General Hospital
- Bon Secours St. Francis Medical Center
- Bon Secours St. Mary's Hospital
- Bon Secours Richmond Community Hospital
- Bon Secours Southside Medical Center
- Bon Secours Southampton Medical Center
- Bon Secours Southern Virginia Medical Center

=== Ireland ===
- Bon Secours Hospital — Limerick
- Bon Secours Hospital Cork
- Bon Secours Hospital Dublin
- Bon Secours Hospital Galway
- Bon Secours Hospital Tralee
