= Bon Secours Harbour View Medical Center =

- Bon Secours (Virginia & South Carolina)

Geography
- Location: Suffolk, Virginia, United States
- Coordinates: 36°52′08″N 76°26′39″W

Organization
- Religious affiliation: Catholic
- Network: Bon Secours Mercy Health

Services
- Emergency department: Yes
- Beds: 18

Links
- Website: www.bonsecours.com/locations/hospitals-medical-centers/hampton-roads/bon-secours-health-center-at-harbour-view
- Lists: Hospitals in Virginia

Bon Secours Harbour View Medical Center is a Short-Term Acute Care facility located in Suffolk, Virginia and operated by Bon Secours, part of Bon Secours Mercy Health.

== History ==
In 1999, Bon Secours built Bon Secours Health Center at Harbour View making it the first health system to invest in the area and respond to the population growth in Western Hampton Roads.

In 2009, Bon Secours Health Center at Harbour View expanded to include a free-standing emergency department and added additional outpatient services.

The continued growth of the area and demand for medical care led to the eventual construction of Bon Secours Harbourview Medical Center.

In 2018, county officials granted a Certificate of Public Need, and planning began for expansion. In 2023, the last steel been of an $80 million expansion was secured in place. The new facility opened in May of 2025 and includes18 in-patient beds and four operating rooms.

== Facilities ==
Bon Secours Harbour View Medical Center consists of medical offices, imaging, lab services and an emergency department. The center partners with nearby Bon Secours Maryview Medical Center for additional shared services. The Harbour View emergency department includes 16 standard beds, a three-bed Fast Track and can accommodate an additional two beds in the hall.

The hospital was designed through a strategic partnership with Hellocare.ai and Accrete Health Partners, both of which are also owned by Bon Secours Mercy Health.

At its opening the hospital was staffed with 100 employees.
