= Antonio Azores =

Filipino lawyer

Antonio Llamado Azores (died November 13, 1998) was a Filipino lawyer, civic leader, and former Dean and founder of San Pablo Colleges, San Pablo City, Laguna.

== Early life and education ==
Azores was a native of San Pablo City, Laguna. He graduated from the University of the Philippines (UP) where he joined the Upsilon Sigma Phi in 1939 and was elected President of the UP Student Council from 1941 to 1942. He received a master's degree in law from Southern Methodist University and a doctorate of law from the University of Santo Tomas in Manila.

== Career ==
Azores practiced law before helping organize and establish the San Pablo Colleges in 1947, where he served as dean of its law school.

In 1969, Azores moved to Virginia. He worked as a patent attorney for a private law firm in Crystal City, then received a presidential appointment as attorney-adviser with the general counsel's office of the U.S. Department of Commerce from 1974 to 1980. He then returned to private practice and formed Azores & Alagao and retired in 1991.

== Civic work ==
Azores was the founding president of what is now the Philippine-American Bar Association and the Philippine-American Heritage Federation. He was also a founding member of the Asian Federal Employees Association and co-founder and first general counsel of the Asian Pacific American Chamber of Commerce. He also served as a member of the Virginia Advisory Committee to the U.S. Commission on Civil Rights.

== Death ==
Azores died of respiratory failure on November 10, 1998, at the Mary Washington Hospital in Fredericksburg.

== Legacy ==
Azores Avenue in San Pablo City and a building in the San Pablo Colleges were named after his honor.
