= List of Alpha Alpha Alpha chapters =

Alpha Alpha Alpha is an American honor society for first-generation college students. It was formed in 2018 at Moravian College in Bethlehem, Pennsylvania. In the following chapter list, active chapters are indicated in bold and inactive chapters are in italics.

Chapter	Charter date and range	Institution	Location	Status	Ref.
**Alpha**	March 24, 2018	Moravian University	Bethlehem, Pennsylvania	Active	(Note: Chapter formed at Moravian College, which became Moravian University in 2021.)
**Beta**		Salem College	Winston-Salem, North Carolina	Active	
**Gamma**		Lafayette College	Easton, Pennsylvania	Active	
**Delta**		Muhlenberg College	Allentown, Pennsylvania	Active	
**Epsilon**	2019	Lehigh University	Bethlehem, Pennsylvania	Active	
**Zeta**	2019	Cedar Crest College	Allentown, Pennsylvania	Active	
**Eta**	2019	DeSales University	Center Valley, Pennsylvania	Active	
**Theta**		Coker University	Hartsville, South Carolina	Active	
**Iota**	2019	Catawba College	Salisbury, North Carolina	Active	
**Kappa**	March 2019	University of Lynchburg	Lynchburg, Virginia	Active	
**Lambda**	2019	Bloomsburg University of Pennsylvania	Bloomsburg, Pennsylvania	Active	
**Mu**	March 2019	Wittenberg University	Springfield, Ohio	Active	
**Nu**		College of St. Scholastica	Duluth, Minnesota	Active	
**Xi**		Hobart and William Smith Colleges	Geneva, New York	Active	
**Omicron**	2019	North Central College	Naperville, Illinois	Active	
**Pi**	2019	Elizabethtown College	Elizabethtown, Pennsylvania	Active	
**Rho**		Northwestern State University	Natchitoches, Louisiana	Active	
**Sigma**	2019	Central College	Pella, Iowa	Active	
**Tau**	2019	Old Dominion University	Norfolk, Virginia	Active	
**Upsilon**	2019	University of Kentucky	Lexington, Kentucky	Active	
**Phi**	November 7, 2019	Millersville University	Millersville, Pennsylvania	Active	
**Chi**		Washburn University	Topeka, Kansas	Active	
**Psi**		Centre College	Danville, Kentucky	Active	
**Omega**	2021	Iowa Wesleyan University	Mount Pleasant, Iowa	Active	
**Alpha Alpha**	March 2020	Heidelberg University	Tiffin, Ohio	Active	
**Alpha Beta**		Westminster College	New Wilmington, Pennsylvania	Active	
**Alpha Gamma**		University of Virginia's College at Wise	Wise, Virginia	Active	
**Alpha Delta**		The New School	New York City, New York	Active	
**Alpha Epsilon**		Penn State Abington	Abington, Pennsylvania	Active	
**Alpha Zeta**		California State University, Stanislaus	Turlock, California	Active	
**Alpha Eta**		University of Tennessee at Chattanooga	Chattanooga, Tennessee	Active	
**Alpha Theta**	2021	Indiana University Southeast	New Albany, Indiana	Active	
**Alpha Iota**	2021	West Chester University	West Chester, Pennsylvania	Active	
**Alpha Kappa**		College of William & Mary	Williamsburg, Virginia	Active	
**Alpha Lambda**		Susquehanna University	Selinsgrove, Pennsylvania	Active	
**Alpha Mu**	2021	William Paterson University	Wayne, New Jersey	Active	
**Alpha Nu**	2020	University of West Alabama	Livingston, Alabama	Active	
**Alpha Xi**		St. Edward's University	Austin, Texas	Active	
**Alpha Omicron**	March 2020	University of North Georgia	Gainesville, Georgia	Active	
Alpha Pi	2020–2023	Finlandia University	Hancock, Michigan	Inactive	(Note: The university closed after the spring semester of 2023.)
**Alpha Rho**	2020	University of North Carolina at Chapel Hill	Chapel Hill, North Carolina	Active	
**Alpha Sigma**		National Louis University	Wheeling, Illinois	Active	
**Alpha Tau**		Westfield State University	Westfield, Massachusetts	Active	
**Alpha Upsilon**		Pennsylvania Western University, California	California, Pennsylvania	Active	(Note: Chapter formed at California University of Pennsylvania, now called Pennsylvania Western University – California Campus.)
**Alpha Phi**	November 2020	California State University, Sacramento	Sacramento, California	Active	
**Alpha Chi**		University of Massachusetts Lowell	Lowell, Massachusetts	Active	
**Alpha Psi**		University of South Carolina	Columbia, South Carolina	Active	
**Alpha Omega**		Seattle University	Seattle, Washington	Active	
**Beta Alpha**	2022	Montgomery County Community College	Blue Bell, Pennsylvania	Active	
**Beta Beta**		Austin Peay State University	Clarksville, Tennessee	Active	
**Beta Gamma**		University of Georgia	Athens, Georgia	Active	
**Beta Delta**		Carroll Community College	Westminster, Maryland	Active	
**Beta Epsilon**	April 2022	Northern Arizona University	Flagstaff, Arizona	Active	
**Beta Zeta**	2021	Washington State University	Pullman, Washington	Active	
**Beta Eta**		Arkansas Tech University	Russellville, Arkansas	Active	
**Beta Theta**		College of Wooster	Wooster, Ohio	Active	
**Beta Iota**		Florida Atlantic University	Boca Raton, Florida	Active	
**Beta Kappa**	2020	University of California, San Diego	La Jolla, California	Active	
**Beta Lambda**	2021	Saint Joseph's University	Philadelphia, Pennsylvania	Active	
**Beta Mu**		Rutgers University–Camden	Camden, New Jersey	Active	
**Beta Nu**	November 2020	Madison Area Technical College	Madison, Wisconsin	Active	
**Beta Xi**		Saint Peter's University	Jersey City, New Jersey	Active	
**Beta Omicron**		Guilford College	Greensboro, North Carolina	Active	
**Beta Pi**	November 2020	Linfield University	McMinnville, Oregon	Active	
**Beta Rho**		University of San Francisco	San Francisco, California	Active	
**Beta Sigma**	2021	University of Central Florida	Orlando, Florida	Active	
**Beta Tau**		Hudson County Community College	Jersey City, New Jersey	Active	
**Beta Upsilon**	2021	Purdue University Global	West Lafayette, Indiana	Active	
**Beta Phi**	2022	Holy Family University	Philadelphia, Pennsylvania	Active	
**Beta Chi**		Arizona State University West campus	Phoenix, Arizona	Active	
**Beta Psi**	2024	Loyola Marymount University	Los Angeles, California	Active	
**Beta Omega**	March 2021	Coastal Carolina University	Conway, South Carolina	Active	
**Gamma Alpha**		Indiana University Kokomo	Kokomo, Indiana	Active	
**Gamma Beta**	2021	Wichita State University	Wichita, Kansas	Active	
**Gamma Gamma**		Stetson University	Deland, Florida	Active	
**Gamma Delta**	Fall 2021	University of Connecticut	Storrs, Connecticut	Active	
**Gamma Epsilon**	2021	University of Wyoming	Laramie, Wyoming	Active	
**Gamma Zeta**	2020	National Louis University	Chicago, Illinois	Active	
**Gamma Eta**	2021	Kansas State University	Manhattan, Kansas	Active	
**Gamma Theta**	2021	University of South Carolina Upstate	Spartanburg, South Carolina	Active	
**Gamma Iota**	2021	Boston University	Boston, Massachusetts	Active	
**Gamma Kappa**		Bryant University	Smithfield, Rhode Island	Active	
**Gamma Lambda**		Eastern Kentucky University	Richmond, Kentucky	Active	
**Gamma Mu**		Menlo College	Atherton, California	Active	
**Gamma Nu**		Agnes Scott College	Decatur, Georgia	Active	
**Gamma Xi**		Northeastern State University	Tahlequah, Oklahoma	Active	
**Gamma Omicron**	May 2021	Roanoke College	Salem, Virginia	Active	
**Gamma Pi**	May 1, 2021	Juniata College	Huntingdon, Pennsylvania	Active	
**Gamma Rho**		University of Memphis	Memphis, Tennessee	Active	
**Gamma Sigma**		Texas State University	San Marcos, Texas	Active	
**Gamma Tau**		California State University, Dominguez Hills	Carson, California	Active	
**Gamma Upsilon**		University of Tennessee	Knoxville, Tennessee	Active	
**Gamma Phi**		Simmons University	Boston, Massachusetts	Active	
**Gamma Chi**	2022	Wentworth Institute of Technology	Boston, Massachusetts	Active	
**Gamma Psi**	2022	Ocean County College	Toms River, New Jersey	Active	
**Gamma Omega**		Fairfield University	Fairfield, Connecticut	Active	
**Delta Alpha**	2021	University of California, Santa Barbara	Santa Barbara, California	Active	
**Delta Beta**		University of Alaska Fairbanks	Fairbanks, Alaska	Active	
**Delta Gamma**	2022	Canisius University	Buffalo, New York	Active	
**Delta Delta**	2023	Texas A&M University–Central Texas	Killeen, Texas	Active	
**Delta Epsilon**	2021	Weber State University	Ogden, Utah	Active	
**Delta Zeta**	May 2022	Chestnut Hill College	Philadelphia, Pennsylvania	Active	
**Delta Eta**		Stockton University	Galloway Township, New Jersey	Active	
**Delta Theta**	2021	Virginia Commonwealth University	Richmond, Virginia	Active	
**Delta Iota**		Marshall University	Huntington, West Virginia	Active	
**Delta Kappa**		California State University Channel Islands	Camarillo, California	Active	
**Delta Lambda**		St. Mary's University, Texas	San Antonio, Texas	Active	
**Delta Mu**	2022	Pitt Community College	Winterville, North Carolina	Active	
**Delta Nu**		Stonehill College	Easton, Massachusetts	Active	
**Delta Xi**		Shippensburg University of Pennsylvania	Shippensburg, Pennsylvania	Active	
**Delta Omicron**	2021	College of the Holy Cross	Worcester, Massachusetts	Active	
**Delta Pi**		Rutgers University–New Brunswick	New Brunswick, New Jersey	Active	
**Delta Rho**	2021	King's College	Wilkes-Barre, Pennsylvania	Active	
**Delta Sigma**	2022	State University of New York at Oneonta	Oneonta, New York	Active	
**Delta Tau**		Rowan University	Glassboro, New Jersey	Active	
**Delta Upsilon**	2021	Purdue University	West Lafayette, Indiana	Active	
**Delta Phi**	2022	South Louisiana Community College	Lafayette, Louisiana	Active	
**Delta Chi**	2021	Montclair State University	Montclair, New Jersey	Active	
**Delta Psi**	2022	Carson–Newman University	Jefferson City, Tennessee	Active	
**Delta Omega**		University of Massachusetts Boston	Boston, Massachusetts	Active	
**Epsilon Alpha**	2022	Marietta College	Marietta, Ohio	Active	
**Epsilon Beta**		Georgian Court University	Lakewood Township, New Jersey	Active	
**Epsilon Gamma**	2022	Eastern Illinois University	Charleston, Illinois	Active	
**Epsilon Delta**		Franklin College	Franklin, Indiana	Active	
**Epsilon Epsilon**		East Stroudsburg University of Pennsylvania	East Stroudsburg, Pennsylvania	Active	
**Epsilon Zeta**	2022	Ohio State University	Columbus, Ohio	Active	
**Epsilon Eta**	2023	College of Saint Benedict and Saint John's University	St. Joseph, Minnesota	Active	
**Epsilon Theta**		Endicott College	Beverly, Massachusetts	Active	
**Epsilon Iota**	2022	Seton Hall University	South Orange, New Jersey	Active	
**Epsilon Kappa**		Illinois Institute of Technology	Chicago, Illinois	Active	
**Epsilon Lambda**		Chicago State University	Chicago, Illinois	Active	
**Epsilon Mu**	2022	University of Louisiana at Lafayette	Lafayette, Louisiana	Active	
**Epsilon Nu**	2022	York College of Pennsylvania	York, Pennsylvania	Active	
**Epsilon Xi**	2022	Gustavus Adolphus College	St. Peter, Minnesota	Active	
**Epsilon Omicron**		Marymount Manhattan College	Manhattan, New York	Active	
**Epsilon Pi**		Dillard University	New Orleans, Louisiana	Active	
**Epsilon Rho**	2022	Salem State University	Salem, Massachusetts	Active	
**Epsilon Sigma**	2023	Ithaca College	Ithaca, New York	Active	
**Epsilon Tau**		Washington University in St. Louis	St. Louis, Missouri	Active	
**Epsilon Upsilon**		Framingham State University	Framingham, Massachusetts	Active	
**Epsilon Phi**		Trinity University	San Antonio, Texas	Active	
**Epsilon Chi**	2023	Ashland Community and Technical College	Ashland, Kentucky	Active	
**Epsilon Psi**		Virginia State University	Petersburg, Virginia	Active	
**Epsilon Omega**	2021	Temple University	Philadelphia, Pennsylvania	Active	
**Zeta Alpha**		California Lutheran University	Thousand Oaks, California	Active	
**Zeta Beta**		Caldwell University	Caldwell, New Jersey	Active	
**Zeta Gamma**		Middlesex College	Edison, New Jersey	Active	
**Zeta Delta**	2022	Saint Mary's University of Minnesota	Winona, Minnesota	Active	
**Zeta Epsilon**		Rockland Community College	Suffern, New York	Active	
**Zeta Zeta**	2022	Glen Oaks Community College	Centreville, Michigan	Active	
**Zeta Eta**		Governors State University	University Park, Illinois	Active	
**Zeta Theta**		University of Wisconsin–Oshkosh	Oshkosh, Wisconsin	Active	
**Zeta Iota**	November 2022	Chowan University	Murfreesboro, North Carolina	Active	
**Zeta Kappa**		Florida SouthWestern State College	Fort Myers, Florida	Active	
**Zeta Lambda**		LaGrange College	LaGrange, Georgia	Active	
**Zeta Mu**	2023	Randolph–Macon College	Ashland, Virginia	Active	
**Zeta Nu**	2023	Ramapo College	Mahwah, New Jersey	Active	
**Zeta Xi**	2023	Centenary University	Hackettstown, New Jersey	Active	
**Zeta Omicron**	2021	Tennessee State University	Nashville, Tennessee	Active	
**Zeta Pi**		Rowan College at Burlington County	Mount Laurel, New Jersey	Active	
**Zeta Rho**	2022	Florida State University	Tallahassee, Florida	Active	
**Zeta Sigma**	2022	Fresno Pacific University	Fresno, California	Active	
**Zeta Tau**		Auburn University at Montgomery	Montgomery, Alabama	Active	
**Zeta Upsilon**	2023	Ferris State University	Big Rapids, Michigan	Active	
**Zeta Phi**		University of Missouri–Kansas City	Kansas City, Missouri	Active	
**Zeta Chi**		Massachusetts College of Pharmacy and Health Sciences	Boston, Massachusetts	Active	
**Zeta Psi**		West Virginia University	Morgantown, West Virginia	Active	
**Zeta Omega**	2023	Pepperdine University	Malibu, California	Active	
**Eta Alpha**		Bucknell University	Lewisburg, Pennsylvania	Active	
**Eta Beta**	2023	Bentley University	Waltham, Massachusetts	Active	
**Eta Gamma**		Waukesha County Technical College	Pewaukee, Wisconsin	Active	
**Eta Delta**	March 2023	Presbyterian College	Clinton, South Carolina	Active	
**Eta Epsilon**		Coe College	Cedar Rapids, Iowa	Active	
**Eta Zeta**		Curry College	Milton, Massachusetts	Active	
**Eta Eta**		Our Lady of the Lake University	San Antonio, Texas	Active	
**Eta Theta**		Suffolk University	Boston, Massachusetts	Active	
**Eta Iota**		Penn State Lehigh Valley	Center Valley, Pennsylvania	Active	
**Eta Kappa**		University of Utah	Salt Lake City, Utah	Active	
**Eta Lambda**		Emerson College	Boston, Massachusetts	Active	
**Eta Mu**	2023	The College of New Jersey	Ewing Township, New Jersey	Active	
**Eta Nu**	April 28, 2023	St. Lawrence University	Canton, New York	Active	
**Eta Xi**		Adelphi University	Garden City, New York	Active	
**Eta Omicron**		Georgia Southern University	Statesboro, Georgia	Active	
**Eta Pi**		North Carolina Central University	Durham, North Carolina	Active	
**Eta Rho**	2023	Technical College of the Lowcountry	Beaufort, South Carolina	Active	
**Eta Sigma**	November 2023	American University	Washington, D.C.	Active	
**Eta Tau**		University of North Carolina at Greensboro	Greensboro, North Carolina	Active	
**Eta Upsilon**	2023	Mercy College of Ohio	Toledo, Ohio	Active	
**Eta Phi**		Piedmont University	Demorest, Georgia	Active	
**Eta Chi**	2023	Gordon State College	Barnesville, Georgia	Active	
**Eta Psi**	2023	Pennsylvania State University, University Park	State College, Pennsylvania	Active	
**Eta Omega**		Auburn University	Auburn, Alabama	Active	
**Theta Alpha**		Immaculata University	Immaculata, Pennsylvania	Active	
**Theta Beta**		Columbia College	Columbia, South Carolina	Active	
**Theta Gamma**	2023	Midwestern University	Downers Grove, Illinois	Active	
**Theta Delta**	2023	Louisiana State University Shreveport	Shreveport, Louisiana	Active	
**Theta Epsilon**		Pace University	Pleasantville, New York	Active	
**Theta Zeta**	April 28, 2024	University of North Carolina at Charlotte	Charlotte, North Carolina	Active	
**Theta Eta**		South Carolina State University	Orangeburg, South Carolina	Active	
**Theta Theta**		State University of New York College of Environmental Science and Forestry	Syracuse, New York	Active	
**Theta Iota**		Johns Hopkins University	Baltimore, Maryland	Active	
**Theta Kappa**		Buena Vista University	Storm Lake, Iowa	Active	
**Theta Lambda**		Texas Tech University	Lubbock, Texas	Active	
**Theta Mu**		Drew University	Madison, New Jersey	Active	
**Theta Nu**		Pennsylvania Institute of Technology	Media, Pennsylvania	Active	
**Theta Xi**	2023	Randolph College	Lynchburg, Virginia	Active	
**Theta Omicron**		Wofford College	Spartanburg, South Carolina	Active	
**Theta Pi**		Fisher College	Boston, Massachusetts	Active	
**Theta Rho**		Purdue University Northwest	Hammond, Indiana	Active	
**Theta Sigma**	2023	Westmont College	Santa Barbara, California	Active	
**Theta Tau**		Stillman College	Tuscaloosa, Alabama	Active	
**Theta Upsilon**		University of Mississippi	University, Mississippi	Active	
**Theta Phi**		Eastern Michigan University	Ypsilanti, Michigan	Active	
**Theta Chi**		Penn State Altoona	Altoona, Pennsylvania	Active	
**Theta Psi**	2024	Hamline University	Saint Paul, Minnesota	Active	
**Theta Omega**		Ferrum College	Ferrum, Virginia	Active	
**Iota Alpha**		Sweet Briar College	Sweet Briar, Virginia	Active	
**Iota Beta**		University of Virginia	Charlottesville, Virginia	Active	
**Iota Gamma**		Kean University	Union Township, New Jersey	Active	
**Iota Delta**		Rutgers University–Newark	Newark, New Jersey	Active	
**Iota Epsilon**		John Carroll University	University Heights, Ohio	Active	
**Iota Zeta**	2023	Arcadia University	Glenside, Pennsylvania	Active	
**Iota Eta**		Claflin University	Orangeburg, South Carolina	Active	
**Iota Theta**		Rollins College	Winter Park, Florida	Active	
**Iota Iota**	2023	Wheeling University	Wheeling, West Virginia	Active	
**Iota Kappa**		Sonoma State University	Rohnert Park, California	Active	
**Iota Lambda**		University of Tampa	Tampa, Florida	Active	
**Iota Mu**	2024	Huntingdon College	Montgomery, Alabama	Active	
**Iota Nu**		Longwood University	Farmville, Virginia	Active	
**Iota Xi**	2024	Mars Hill University	Mars Hill, North Carolina	Active	
**Iota Omicron**		North Carolina A&T State University	Greensboro, North Carolina	Active	
**Iota Pi**		Elmira College	Elmira, New York	Active	
**Iota Rho**		Clayton State University	Morrow, Georgia	Active	
**Iota Sigma**		Thomas Jefferson University	Philadelphia, Pennsylvania	Active	
**Iota Tau**		Oakland University	Rochester, Michigan	Active	
**Iota Upsilon**		State University of New York at Cobleskill	Cobleskill, New York	Active	
**Iota Phi**		Texas A&M University	College Station, Texas	Active	
**Iota Chi**		University of Maine at Farmington	Farmington, Maine	Active	
**Iota Psi**		Albany Technical College	Albany, Georgia	Active	
**Iota Omega**	January 2024	West Texas A&M University	Canyon, Texas	Active	
**Kappa Alpha**		Meridian Community College	Meridian, Mississippi	Active	
**Kappa Beta**		Marymount University	Arlington, Virginia	Active	
**Kappa Gamma**		University of Mary Washington	Fredericksburg, Virginia	Active	
**Kappa Delta**		Penn State York	Spring Garden Township, Pennsylvania	Active	
**Kappa Epsilon**	2024	Rowan College of South Jersey	Sewell, New Jersey	Active	
**Kappa Zeta**	2024	Mount Saint Mary College	Newburgh, New York	Active	
**Kappa Eta**		Lenoir–Rhyne University	Hickory, North Carolina	Active	
**Kappa Theta**	February 2024	Gwynedd Mercy University	Lower Gwynedd Township, Pennsylvania	Active	
**Kappa Iota**	2024	California State University, Fresno	Fresno, California	Active	
**Kappa Kappa**		La Salle University	Philadelphia, Pennsylvania	Active	
**Kappa Lambda**		Winthrop University	Rock Hill, South Carolina	Active	
**Kappa Mu**		Mississippi State University	Starkville, Mississippi	Active	
**Kappa Nu**		University of Missouri	Columbia, Missouri	Active	
**Kappa Xi**		University of Tennessee at Martin	Martin, Tennessee	Active	
**Kappa Omicron**		Misericordia University	Dallas, Pennsylvania	Active	
**Kappa Pi**		Sussex County Community College	Newton, New Jersey	Active	
**Kappa Rho**		Wiley University	Marshall, Texas	Active	
**Kappa Sigma**		Borough of Manhattan Community College	New York City, New York	Active	
**Kappa Tau**		Hawkeye Community College	Waterloo, Iowa	Active	
**Kappa Upsilon**		Penn State Greater Allegheny	McKeesport, Pennsylvania	Active	
**Kappa Phi**		Newberry College	Newberry, South Carolina	Active	
**Kappa Chi**	2024	University of Scranton	Scranton, Pennsylvania	Active	
**Kappa Psi**		Loma Linda University School of Pharmacy	Loma Linda, California	Active	
**Kappa Omega**		Jackson State University	Jackson, Mississippi	Active	
**Lambda Alpha**		Marywood University	Scranton, Pennsylvania	Active	
**Lambda Beta**		Penn State Berks	Reading, Pennsylvania	Active	
**Lambda Gamma**		University of Puget Sound	Tacoma, Washington	Active	
**Lambda Delta**	June 2024	Oberlin College	Oberlin, Ohio	Active	
**Lambda Epsilon**		Johnson University	Knoxville, Tennessee	Active	
**Lambda Zeta**		Eastman School of Music	Rochester, New York	Active	
**Lambda Eta**		University of Kansas	Lawrence, Kansas	Active	
**Lambda Theta**		San Antonio College	San Antonio, Texas	Active	
**Lambda Iota**		Davenport University	Grand Rapids, Michigan	Active	
**Lambda Kappa**		Augusta University	Augusta, Georgia	Active	
**Lambda Lambda**		Eastern Connecticut State University	Willimantic, Connecticut	Active	
**Lambda Mu**		University of Arkansas	Fayetteville, Arkansas	Active	
**Lambda Nu**		University of Maryland, Baltimore County	Baltimore, Maryland	Active	
**Lambda Xi**		Pennsylvania College of Technology	Williamsport, Pennsylvania	Active	
**Lambda Omicron**		Penn State Scranton	Dunmore, Pennsylvania	Active	
**Lambda Pi**		Daemen University	Amherst, New York	Active	
**Lambda Rho**		Mercyhurst University	Erie, Pennsylvania	Active	
**Lambda Sigma**		Tulane University	New Orleans, Louisiana	Active	
**Lambda Tau**		Carnegie Mellon University	Pittsburgh, Pennsylvania	Active	
**Lambda Upsilon**		University of Miami	Coral Gables, Florida	Active	
**Lambda Phi**		Western Illinois University	Macomb, Illinois	Active	
**Lambda Chi**		Creighton University	Omaha, Nebraska	Active	
**Lambda Psi**		State University of New York at Geneseo	Geneseo, New York	Active	
**Nu Pi**	Fall 2025	Moberly Area Community College	Moberly, Missouri; Columbia, Missouri; Mexico, Missouri; Hannibal, Missouri; Kirksville, Missouri	Active	

== See also ==
- Honor society
- Honor cord
