= Bon Secours DePaul Medical Center =

Former hospital in Norfolk, Virginia, United States

Coordinates: 36.899°N 76.2816°W

- Bon Secours

Geography
- Location: 150 Kingsley Lane, Norfolk, Virginia, United States

Services
- Beds: 238

History
- Founded: 1855
- Closed: March 31, 2021

Links
- Website: Bon Secours Depaul Medical Center
- Lists: Hospitals in Virginia

Bon Secours DePaul Medical Center was a historical, general medical and surgical hospital located in Norfolk, Virginia and affiliated with the Bon Secours Health System.

== History ==
Founded in 1855, as the Hospital of St. Vincent de Paul, DePaul was Norfolk's first civilian and public hospital. The hospital was originally located on Church and Wood St. in downtown Norfolk in the home of the late Miss Ann Plume Behan Herron. When Herron died of yellow fever in 1855, being a wealthy patron, she willed the house to the sisters for the purpose of founding a hospital. The Hospital of St. Vincent DePaul was incorporated in 1856 by eight Daughters of Charity during the yellow fever epidemic. The Sisters of the Daughters of Charity came to Norfolk in 1839 to run St. Mary's Orphan Asylum and care for the sick and dying during the yellow fever epidemic in Norfolk.

Starting with just eight rooms, a clinic for the poor was added in 1892, and a nursing school began in 1893. In 1899, a fire nearly destroyed the hospital that had grown to 150 rooms, but it was rebuilt and enlarged in 1901.

In 1944 the hospital was renamed DePaul Hospital and moved to its present location at Kingsley Lane and Granby St. in the city of Norfolk, Virginia. After, the hospital moved the basement and annexes of the old hospital, and housed classes for the Norfolk Division of the Virginia State College (now Norfolk State University) until 1958. DePaul is the oldest Catholic public hospital in Virginia.

In 1996, the Sisters of Bon Secours extended the Daughters of Charity ministry by assuming the sponsorship for DePaul.

On March 31, 2021, DePaul Medical Center was permanently closed to Acute care services. Many services were transferred to Maryview Medical Center in Portsmouth, leaving Norfolk General Hospital as the only remaining hospital in the western part of the city (Sentara Leigh Hospital serves the eastern portion of the city).

== See also ==
- Bon Secours Maryview Medical Center, also in Hampton Roads, Virginia
