= Bon Secours Southern Virginia Medical Center =

- Bon Secours (Virginia & South Carolina)

Geography
- Location: 727 N Main St. Emporia, Virginia 23847, Virginia, United States
- Coordinates: 36°42′06″N 77°32′16″W

Organization
- Type: General
- Religious affiliation: Catholic
- Network: Bon Secours Mercy Health

Services
- Emergency department: Yes
- Beds: 93

Helipads
- Helipad: yes, 73VA

History
- Former name: Southern Regional Virginia Medical Center
- Opened: 2003

Links
- Website: www.bonsecours.com/locations/hospitals-medical-centers/richmond/southern-virginia-regional-medical-center
- Lists: Hospitals in Virginia

Bon Secours Southern Virginia Medical Center is an 80-bed licensed acute care hospital serving Emporia, Virginia and surrounding communities. It is owned and operated by Bon Secours.

== History ==
The Southern Virginia Medical Center traces its history to Greensville Memorial Hospital in Emporia. When it opened in 1961 it employed 53 people and maintained 41 beds.

Greensville Memorial Hospital closed in 2003 and was replaced with the Southern Regional Virginia Medical Center.

In 2020, Bon Secours purchased Southern Regional Virginia Medical Center and two other regional hospitals from Community Health Systems. Bon Secours changed the name, dropping the “Regional” moniker.

The following year, the Bishop of the Catholic Diocese of Richmond blessed Southern Virginia Medical Center, making it an official Catholic hospital.

== Facilities ==
Bon Secours Southern Virginia Medical Center offers 80 beds and includes an ICU and an emergency department with an ambulance bay and helipad.

Key services include general health, cardiology, pulmonology, psychology and urology.
