= Riverside Regional Medical Center =

Riverside Regional Medical Center may refer to:

- Riverside University Health System Medical Center, a county-run hospital in Moreno Valley, California
- Riverside Regional Medical Center, part of Riverside Health in Newport News, Virginia
