= Augusta Health =

Coordinates: 38°5′40.4″N 78°59′10″W

Geography
- Location: Augusta County, Virginia, United States

Organization
- Funding: Non-profit hospital
- Type: Community

Services
- Beds: 255
- Helipad: Yes

History
- Opened: 1994

Links
- Website: www.augustahealth.com
- Lists: Hospitals in Virginia

Augusta Health, formerly Augusta Medical Center, is a hospital in Fishersville, Virginia. It serves Augusta County, Virginia, as well as the cities of Staunton and Waynesboro. It is located near I-64. Augusta Medical Center was formed in 1994 as a consolidation of Kings Daughters Hospital in Staunton, and Waynesboro Community Hospital in Waynesboro. Augusta Medical Center changed its name to Augusta Health in June 2009.The campus went tobacco-free in 2009. Augusta Health has a member only gym. It provides cardio, weight lifting, inside and outside tennis courts, basketball, track, pool, and spa for its members. Many classes are offered including wellness and fitness programs. In March 2013 it opened a new $32 million cardiovascular center which is a 67,000-square-foot facility offering nuclear stress-testing machines and two heart catheterization labs. The hospital completed an expansion of its emergency department in November 2019, with major donations of around $2.13 million.
