= Riverside College of Health Sciences =

Health college in Newport News, Virginia, US

- Former names: Elizabeth Buxton Hospital School of Nursing; Riverside College of Health Careers
- Type: Private two-year
- Established: 1916
- Affiliations: Riverside Health
- Students: 303
- Location: 316 Main Street, Norfolk, Virginia, United States; 36.8460°N 76.2896°W
- Campus: Urban
- Website: www.riverside.edu/en

Riverside College of Health Sciences is an American private nonprofit educational institution. It was established in 1916 at the Elizabeth Buxton Hospital School of Nursing and was later called the Riverside College of Health Careers. It is located in Newport News, Virginia and is associated with Riverside Health.

== History ==
Riverside College of Health Science originated in 1916 as the Elizabeth Buxton Hospital School of Nursing. The college was originally associated with the privately owned Elizabeth Buxton Hospital. In May 1952, Buxton Hospital became the Mary Immaculate Hospital after being purchased by the Bernardine Sisters of St. Francis. However, the nursing school continued its relationship with the hospital.

Later, it became the Riverside College of Health Careers when the hospital was renamed Riverside Regional Medical Center, now Riverside Health. In 2015, the college started a partnership with Old Dominion University School of Nursing. Riverside College of Health Careers became Riverside College of Health Sciences on June 20, 2024. Between 1916 and June 2024, it has graduated 8,000 students. The college is a private nonprofit educational institution.

== Campus ==
Riverside College of Health Sciences has a city campus located at 316 Main Street in Newport News, Virginia 23601. Its facility includes classrooms, clinical skills laboratories, and a medical library. The college also offers distance education.

== Academics ==
Riverside College of Health Sciences offers an associate degree in physical therapy assistant, radiologic technology, registered nursing, respiratory care, and surgical technology. It has certificate programs for cardiovascular technology, nurse aide, and practical nursing.

Riverside College of Health Sciences is accredited by the Accreditation Commission for Education in Nursing. In 2017, Forbes ranked the college #8 of U.S. two-year trade schools.

The college has a chapter of Sigma Theta Tau international honor society for nursing.

== Students ==
As of 2025, Riverside College of Health Sciences has 303 students. Of those students, 67 percent are White, 15 percent are Black, seven percent are two or more races, five percent are Asian, five percent are Hispanic or Latino, and one percent is of an unknown race. Eleven percent of the students are male, and 89 percent are female.
