= Spotsylvania Regional Medical Center =

Coordinates: 38°13′1.1″N 77°29′43.8″W

- Hospital Corporation of America

Geography
- Location: 4600 Spotsylvania Parkway, Fredericksburg, Virginia, United States

Organization
- Care system: Private
- Type: General

Services
- Beds: 133

History
- Founded: 2010

Links
- Website: https://spotsrmc.com/
- Lists: Hospitals in Virginia

Spotsylvania Regional Medical Center (SRMC) is a hospital in Spotsylvania County, Virginia. The hospital is a subsidiary of Hospital Corporation of America.

== History ==
SRMC celebrated its opening on June 7, 2010, becoming a part of the HCA Healthcare system in Virginia.

== Operations ==
Spotsylvania Regional Medical Center is a $175 million 133 inpatient bed facility that provides a wide range of in/out patient services including emergency care, cardiac care, and behavioral health services. SRMC recently opened and operates Spotsylvania Regional Cancer Center, a center specializing in cancer treatment, in cooperation with VCU's Massey Cancer Center.

SRMC has over 750 staff members and pays roughly $1 million to Spotsylvania County in taxes. Spotsylvania Regional Medical Center operates as a community hospital and also provides large amounts of charity care.

== Awards ==
In September 2010, Spotsylvania Regional Medical Center earned Health Care Project of the Year from Mid-Atlantic Construction Magazine and is Joint Commission accredited.
