= Fauquier Health System =

Fauquier Health Hospital
- Bon Secours

Geography
- Location: 500 Hospital Dr Warrenton, VA 20186, VA, United States
- Coordinates: 38.7129583°N 77.8097306°W

Organization
- Type: General
- Religious affiliation: Secular
- Network: Healthspan Partners

Services
- Emergency department: Level I trauma center
- Beds: 96

Helipads
- Helipad: (FAA LID: 8VA3)

History
- Constructed: December 1, 1958
- Founded: February 26, 1925
- Opened: 1942
- Closed: 1940

Links
- Website: www.fauquierhealth.org
- Lists: Hospitals in the United States

Fauquier Health Hospital, also called "the Hospital on the Hill," is a 97-bed acute hospital located in Warrenton that serves as the cornerstone of the Fauquier health system. Currently owned and operated by Healthspan Partners, a subsidiary of Bon Secours Mercy Health. The hospital was originally established in 1925 at the John Marshall Building in Warrenton. It later relocated to a newly built facility at its current location in 1958. The hospital's cafeteria, commonly called "The Bistro" or "The Bistro on the Hill" is frequented by locals since opening to the public in the 2010s. The cafeteria's food standards are a main factor in the hospital's Planetree Certification.

== History ==
Fauquier Health originally opened a 20-bed facility in 1925 within the John Marshall Building in Warrenton. The hospital operated at this location until its closure in 1940, when it was forced to close due to financial struggles. In 1942, a slightly larger hospital was reopened.

In 1954, Tom Frost along with several other citizens purchased the hospital with the goal of constructing a larger, more permanent facility. The new hospital was constructed in its current location on a plot of land donated by Robert and Marion van Roijen.

In 2002, the campus was renovated, with its current five-story central hub being constructed.

=== LifePoint Health ===
Fauquier Health operated as an independent non-profit organization until October 2013, when it was acquired by LifePoint Health for $82.6 Million. Rodger H. Baker was named the hospital's CEO in 1988 and oversaw this change in ownership. Baker acted as CEO through 2017, the hospital's longest acting CEO.

In 2017, the hospital constructed a new multipurpose building to act as both an infusion center and office building for physicians.

In 2025, a time capsule from 1957 was opened in the lobby. Its contents are now on display within the hospital's lobby. A new time capsule was buried in its place, with its contents including a COVID-19 test and a onesie from the birthing ward.

=== Bon Secours ===
Plans for Bon Secours Mercy Health to acquire the Fauquier Hospital were announced in mid-2026. The transfer was made in late October 2026.
