= Convent de Bon Secours =

- U.S. National Register of Historic Places
- D.C. Inventory of Historic Sites
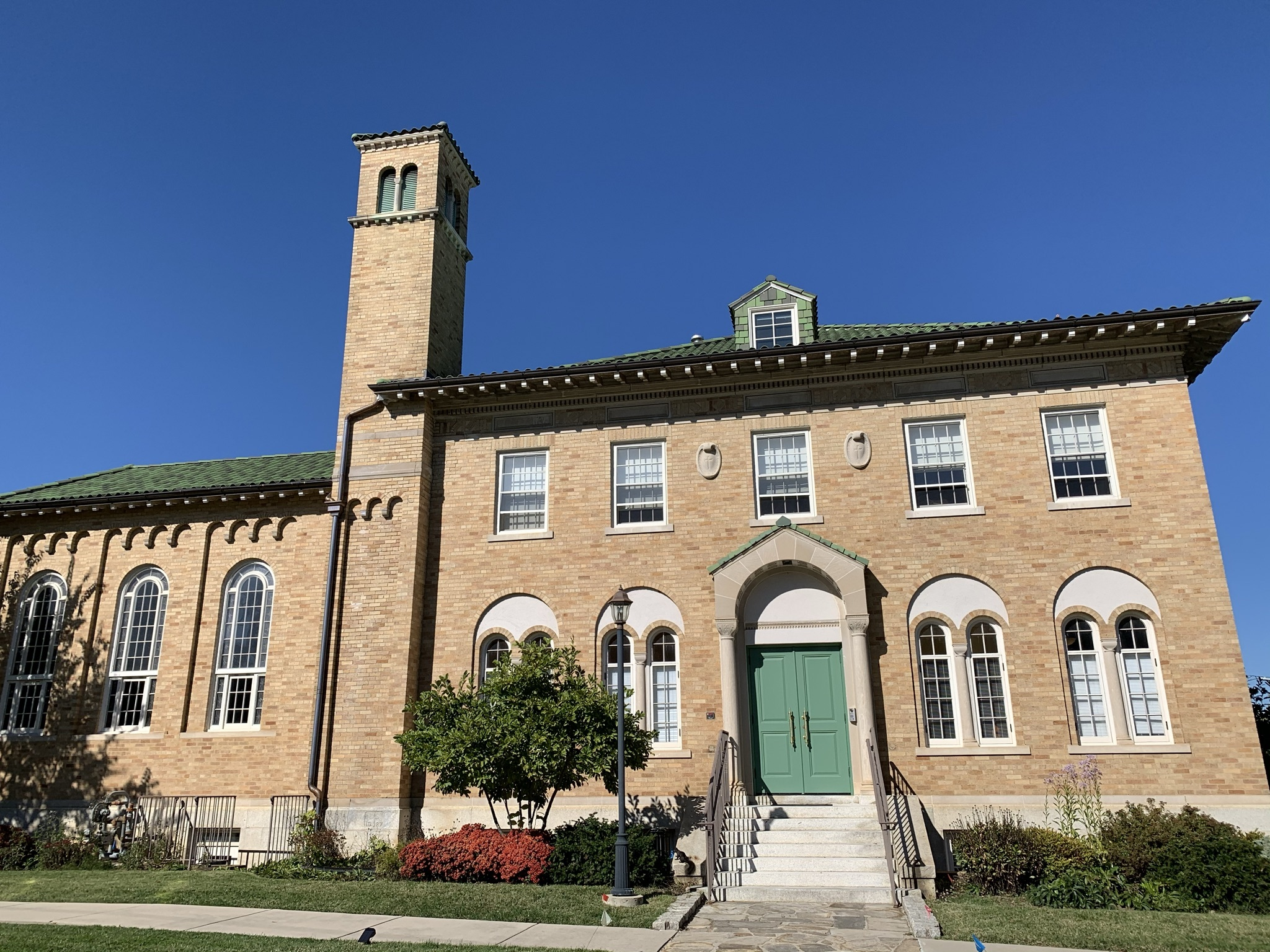

- Location within District of Columbia Location within the United States
- Location: 4101 Yuma Street NW; Washington, D.C.
- Coordinates: 38°56′54″N 77°4′50″W
- Built: 1927-1928
- Architect: Maurice F. Moore
- Architectural style: Italianate
- NRHP reference No.: 04001237

Significant dates
- Added to NRHP: November 19, 2004
- Designated DCIHS: January 29, 2004

Convent de Bon Secours is an early-20th century residence located in the Tenleytown neighborhood in the Northwest Quadrant of Washington, D.C. It has been listed in the National Register of Historic Places since 2004.

== History ==
The Congregation of the Sisters of Bon Secours was founded in France in 1824. They came to the United States in the 1880s and came to Washington in 1905 during a typhoid epidemic to provide healthcare. They were particularly beneficial during a Spanish flu outbreak after World War I.

Upon arriving in Washington, D.C., in 1905, the Sisters moved into the old rectory at St. Ann's Church in Tenleytown. Between 1927 and 1928, the Italianate style convent was constructed to be the chapter house for the Washington, D.C., location for the Sisters. The 2 1/2-story structure clad in buff-colored brick was designed by Irish-born architect Maurice F. Moore. The building is composed of a main dormitory section with a hipped roof, a chapel, a small arcaded tower, and rear loggias that are reminiscent of a Renaissance cloister.
