= Lake Taylor Transitional Care Hospital =

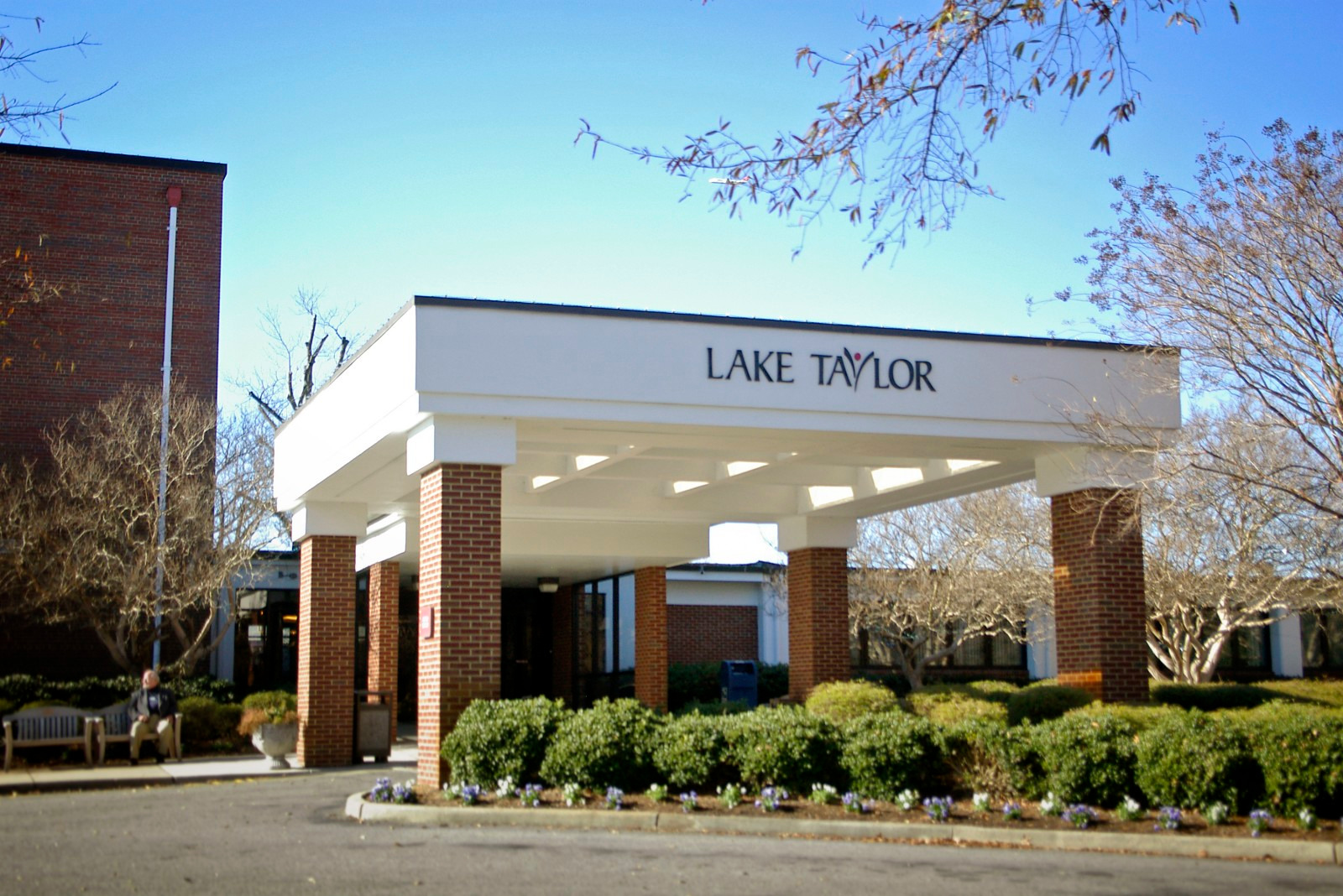
- Facility Main Entrance

Geography
- Location: 1309 Kempsville Road, Norfolk, Virginia, Hampton Roads, Virginia, United States
- Coordinates: 36°52′0.16″N 76°12′22.94″W

Organization
- Care system: Stand-alone
- Funding: Non-profit
- Type: Specialist

Services
- Emergency department: No
- Beds: 296
- Speciality: Rehabilitation and long term care

History
- Opened: 1890

Links
- Website: www.laketaylor.org
- Lists: Hospitals in Virginia

Lake Taylor Transitional Care Hospital (LTTCH) is a 296-bed, state-licensed, long-term acute care hospital and nursing facility located in Norfolk, Virginia. LTTCH is a not-for-profit organization governed by a Board of Commissioners appointed by the Norfolk City Council with an incorporation name of "Hospital Authority of Norfolk."

== History ==
1890: The "Norfolk Alms House", a shelter for the poor and homeless, was moved from Norfolk to Princess Anne County to accommodate the growing number of sick and disabled. This was the origin of Lake Taylor, which still occupies the same site.

1925: Renamed the "Municipal Contagious Disease Hospital" - known locally as the Municipal Hospital.

1954: A new 201-bed municipal hospital was built to replace the older buildings. Lake Taylor became known as a sub-acute care facility.

1960s: Higher patient demand facilitated the expansion of the Municipal Hospital to a 384-bed facility.

1970: Facility name was officially changed to "Lake Taylor City Hospital" and the facility capabilities were divided into 2 branches - sub-acute care and nursing care. Was operated as a bureau under the umbrella of the Department of Human Services with the City of Norfolk.

1982: Extensive renovations were completed with upgrades and expansion to 104 sub-acute care beds and 192 nursing care beds.

1988: The "Hospital Authority of Norfolk" was formed as a political subdivision of the Commonwealth of Virginia. The hospital was re-established as "Lake Taylor Hospital" and would operate as an autonomous long-term care hospital.

1997: Opening of the sub-acute care pediatric unit.

2002: Name changed to "Lake Taylor Transitional Care Hospital."

2011: Construction of a new "Beechwood" wing completed and extensive renovations started on all existing wings.

2013: The remodeling of Azalea was completed, finishing the remodeling projects of all the wings in the facility including 2E, 2W, 3E, Camellia, and Dogwood.

2024: Remodeling of the 25 bed pediatric wing was completed.

== Services ==
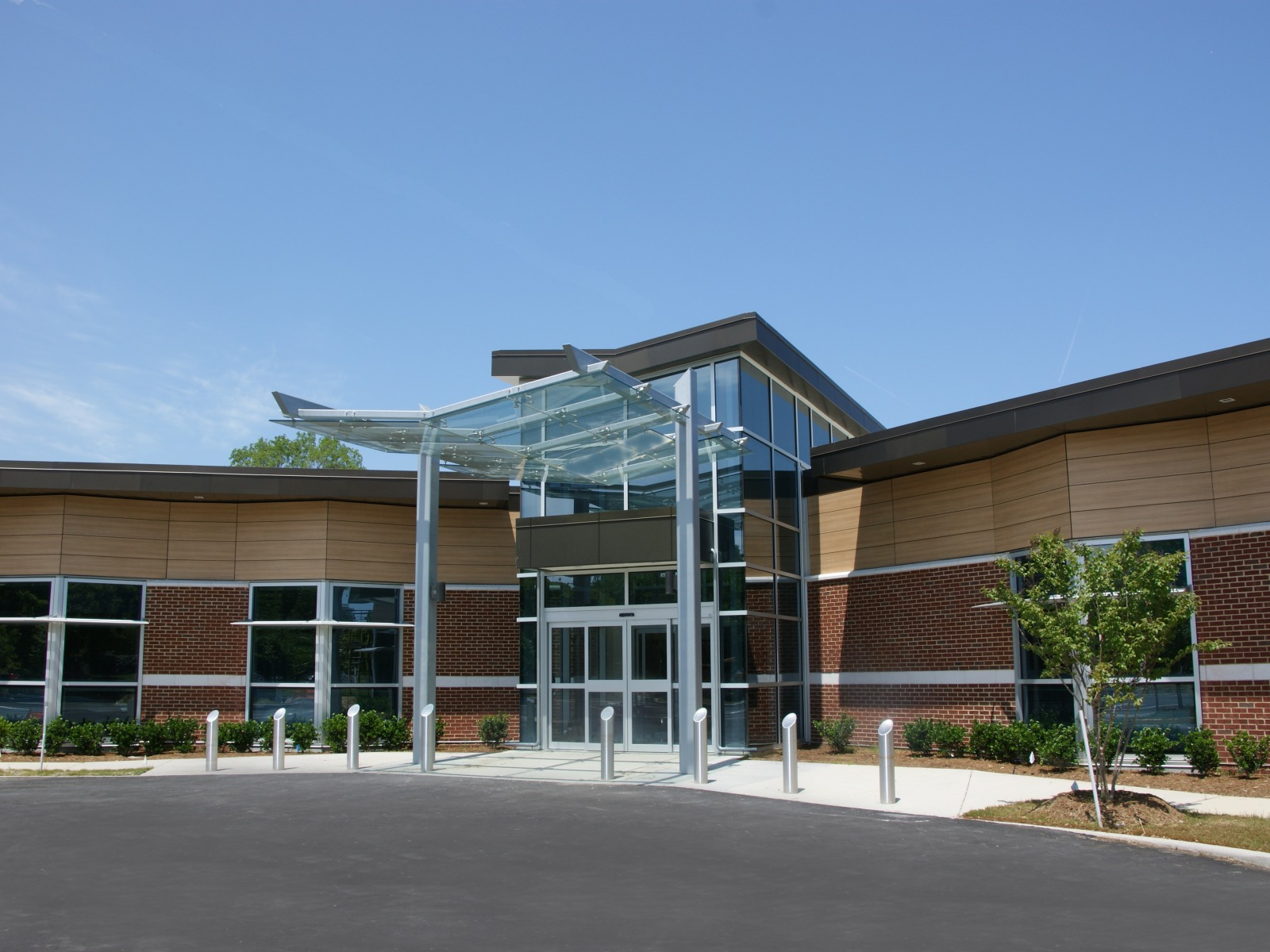
Beechwood Wing entrance, LTTCH

- Orthopedics
- Respiratory Therapy
- Cardiac and Pulmonary Disease
- Neurological and Neuromuscular Disorders
- Stroke
- Diabetes
- Cancer Care
- Post-Trauma
- Arthritis
- Pain Management
- Pediatric Care

== See also ==
- System of concepts to support continuity of care
- Transitional care
