= Bon Secours Southampton Medical Center =

- Bon Secours (Virginia & South Carolina)
- Main entrance for the Bon Secours Southampton Medical Center, 2026

Geography
- Location: Franklin, Virginia, Virginia, United States
- Coordinates: 36°41′35″N 76°56′15″W

Organization
- Religious affiliation: Catholic
- Network: Bon Secours Mercy Health

Services
- Emergency department: Yes
- Beds: 219

Helipads
- Helipad: yes, 9VA9

History
- Opened: 1963

Links
- Website: www.bonsecours.com/locations/hospitals-medical-centers/hampton-roads/southampton-memorial-hospital
- Lists: Hospitals in Virginia

Bon Secours Southampton Medical Center is a 219-bed, short-term acute care, non-profit hospital in Franklin, Virginia. It is owned and operated by Bon Secours, part of Bon Secours Mercy Health.

== History ==
Bon Secours Southampton Medical Center can trace its history to the 1950's when community leaders determined that Raiford Hospital couldn't keep up with the region's growth and began generating support and planning for a new hospital.

In 1963, Southampton Memorial Hospital opened with 221 beds. Bon Secours acquired the hospital in 2019 and changed the name shortly after.

== Facilities ==
Bon Secours Richmond Community Hospital has 219 beds. Clinical services include Orthopedics, Radiology, Hemodialysis, Surgery, Wound Care, an ICU and Emergency Department.
