= Bon Secours Mary Immaculate Hospital =

- Bon Secours (Virginia & South Carolina)

Geography
- Location: Newport News Newport News, Virginia 23602, Virginia, United States
- Coordinates: 37°08′42″N 76°30′56″W

Organization
- Type: General
- Religious affiliation: Catholic
- Network: Bon Secours Mercy Health

Services
- Emergency department: Yes
- Beds: 114

Helipads
- Helipad: yes, 8VA8 (ICAO: 8VA8)

History
- Opened: 1952

Links
- Website: www.bonsecours.com/locations/hospitals-medical-centers/hampton-roads/bon-secours-mary-immaculate-hospital
- Lists: Hospitals in Virginia

Bon Secours Mary Immaculate Hospital is a short-term acute care hospital in Newport News, Virginia. The hospital has 114 beds and a 24-hour emergency department. The non-profit hospital is owned and operated by Bon Secours.

== History ==
In 1952, the Virginia chapter of the Bernardine Franciscan Sisters opened Mary Immaculate Hospital to provide faith-based care on the Virginia Peninsula.

In 1996, Mary Immaculate Hospital became a member of the not-for-profit Bon Secours Health System, later becoming part of Bon Secours Mercy Health in 2018.

== Facilities ==
The 114-bed facility serves the greater Newport News area and the Virginia Peninsula. It’s best known for its cardiology, orthopedic surgery and pulmonology services. Of the 114 beds, 10 are dedicated to the emergency department.

Bon Secours Mary Immaculate Hospital began construction on a new patient tower in early 2026, representing a $200 million investment. The 144,000-square-foot, four-story tower will expand the hospital's emergency department, labor and delivery, and the NICU. The expanded facility is expected to open 2028.
