= Mercy Health Fairfield Hospital =

Geography
- Location: Fairfield, Ohio, United States
- Coordinates: 39.3126°N 84.5199°W

Organization
- Religious affiliation: Catholic
- Network: Mercy Health

Services
- Emergency department: Yes
- Beds: 219

Helipads
- Helipad: yes, 5OH7

History
- Opened: September 13, 1978

Links
- Lists: Hospitals in Ohio

Mercy Health — Fairfield Hospital is a 219-bed non-profit hospital in Fairfield, Butler County, Ohio, owned and operated by the Mercy Health division of Bon Secours Mercy Health.

== History ==
The hospital was built on farmland donated by the city of Fairfield to the Sisters of Mercy, which already operated a hospital in Hamilton. The facility was dedicated as Mercy Hospital South on August 19, 1978, although the first admission of patients was delayed until September 13 because some equipment was not delivered on time.

Mercy Health Fairfield was originally constructed to support 150 beds. The building has been expanded several times, with the addition of outpatient surgery and clinic offices in the mid-1980s, a fitness center named the HealthPlex in the late 1990s, and a new patient tower which opened in 2005. These changes increased the number of inpatient beds to 293 by 2013. The hospital was the first in Butler County to offer open heart surgery. It was also the first to use robotic surgery for patient care.

In 2014, the hospital was sued for medical malpractice by the family of astronaut Neil Armstrong, who had died from complications of coronary artery bypass surgery at the hospital in 2012. During recovery from the procedure, Armstrong suffered from internal bleeding after a temporary pacemaker was removed, and he was taken to the hospital's catheterization laboratory instead of being moved directly to an operating room. A physician consulted by the court described this decision as a "major error" that likely resulted in Armstrong's death. Mercy Health paid a $6 million settlement to Armstrong's family, and the malpractice case was not publicly disclosed until 2019, when a package of documents from the case was anonymously sent to The New York Times.

In 2022, the hospital presented plans to the Fairfield City Council and Planning Commission to expand by adding a 30,000-square-foot single-story medical office building.

== Facilities ==
Mercy Health Fairfield Hospital is a Short Term Acute Care hospital. The hospital includes an emergency department with 36 beds. Specialty services include emergency care, a 24-hour cardiac cath lab, vascular surgery, cardiothoracic surgery, neurology, psychiatry and bariatrics.

== Residency Program ==
In 2025, Mercy Health — Fairfield Hospital started its residency program with 12 internal medicine residents. Each resident has four years of medical education and four years of undergraduate college. The program lasts three years. It is expected to grow to 54 students by 2028.
