= Bon Secours St. Francis Eastside Hospital, Greenville =

Bon Secours St. Francis Eastside
- Bon Secours (Virginia & South Carolina)

Geography
- Location: Greenville, South Carolina, United States
- Coordinates: 34°51′05″N 82°19′23″W

Organization
- Type: General
- Religious affiliation: Catholic
- Network: Bon Secours Mercy Health

Services
- Emergency department: Yes
- Beds: 93

Helipads
- Helipad: no

History
- Former name: Emma Moss Booth Hospital
- Opened: 1991

Links
- Website: www.bonsecours.com/locations/specialty-locations/maternity/st-francis-eastside
- Lists: Hospitals in South Carolina

Bon Secours St. Francis Eastside Hospital is a short-term acute-care hospital located in Greenville, South Carolina. It is operated by Bon Secours, part of Bon Secours Mercy Health.

== History ==
In February of 1932, the Sisters of St. Francis purchased the Emma Moss Booth Hospital from the Salvation Army. The hospital was rebuilt in 1971. In 2000, ownership of the hospital was transferred to the Bon Secours Health System.

In 1991, the Eastside hospital was opened.

== Facilities ==
Bon Secours St. Francis Eastside Hospital has 93 beds. It is located on Greenville's eastside. It offers a 24/7 Level II Emergency Room, general medical, surgical and critical care services.

The hospital is recognized for its strengths in chronic obstructive pulmonary disease (COPD), colon cancer surgery, heart attack, heart failure, joint replacement, kidney failure and cancer treatment. In 2025 it was named a US News and World Report "Best Hospital."

In 2025, Bon Secour official announced significant renovations to its Women's Center including new advanced equipment and technology, space and lighting improvements and redesigned labor and delivery suites.
