= List of hospitals in Virginia =

This is a list of hospitals in the Commonwealth of Virginia in the United States, sorted by hospital name.

Name	City	County	Licensed beds	Trauma designation	Affiliation	Notes
Alexander T. Augusta Military Medical Center	Fort Belvoir, Fairfax County		120		Department of Defense	Previously known as the Fort Belvoir Community Hospital
Augusta Health	Fishersville, Augusta County		238		Private, nonprofit	
Bath County Community Hospital	Hot Springs, Bath County		25		Private, nonprofit	Critical access hospital
Bon Secours Mary Immaculate Hospital	Newport News		123		Bon Secours Health System (USA)	
Bon Secours Maryview Medical Center	Portsmouth		346		Bon Secours Health System (USA)	Bon Secours Health Center at Harbour View operates as a department of Bon Secours Maryview Medical Center
Bon Secours Memorial Regional Medical Center	Mechanicsville, Hanover County		269		Bon Secours Health System (USA)	
Bon Secours Richmond Community Hospital	Richmond		104		Bon Secours Health System (USA)	
Bon Secours St. Francis Medical Center	Midlothian, Chesterfield County		130		Bon Secours Health System (USA)	
Bon Secours Southampton Memorial Center	Franklin		90		Bon Secours Health System (USA)	
Bon Secours Southern Virginia Medical Center	Emporia		80		Bon Secours Health System (USA)	
Bon Secours Southside Medical Center	Petersburg		300	Level III	Bon Secours Health System (USA)	
Bon Secours St. Mary's Hospital	Richmond		391		Bon Secours Health System (USA)	
Buchanan General Hospital	Grundy, Buchanan County		99		Private, nonprofit	
Carilion Franklin Memorial Hospital	Rocky Mount, Franklin County		37		Carilion Clinic	
Carilion Giles Memorial Hospital	Pearisburg, Giles County		25		Carilion Clinic	Critical access hospital
Carilion New River Valley Medical Center	Christiansburg, Montgomery County		146	Level III	Carilion Clinic	
Carilion Roanoke Community Hospital	Roanoke				Carilion Clinic	"Magnet designated" with the nearby Carilion Roanoke Memorial Hospital
Carilion Roanoke Memorial Hospital	Roanoke		752	Level I	Carilion Clinic and Virginia Tech Carilion School of Medicine and Research Institute	
Carilion Rockbridge Community Hospital	Lexington		25		Carilion Clinic	Formerly known as Stonewall Jackson Hospital
Carilion Tazewell Community Hospital	Tazewell, Tazewell County		56		Carilion Clinic	
Centra Bedford Memorial Hospital	Bedford, Bedford County		50		Centra Health	
Centra Lynchburg General Hospital	Lynchburg		358	Level II	Centra Health	
Centra Southside Community Hospital	Farmville, Cumberland and Prince Edward Counties		40		Centra Health	
Centra Virginia Baptist Hospital	Lynchburg		317		Centra Health	
Chesapeake Regional Medical Center	Chesapeake		310		Private, nonprofit	
Children's Hospital of The King's Daughters	Norfolk		212	Level I	Private, nonprofit	Affiliated with Eastern Virginia Medical School
Children's Hospital of Richmond at VCU	Richmond		208		VCU Health	CHoR has 168 dedicated (staffed) inpatient pediatric beds and VCU Medical Center offers an additional 40 beds in specialized inpatient units that provide care for both children and adults.
CJW Medical Center (Chippenham & Johnston-Willis)	Richmond		667	Level I	HCA Healthcare	CJW Medical Center is composed of the Chippenham campus on Jahnke Rd and the Johnston-Willis campus at 1401 Johnston-Willis Drive
Clinch Valley Medical Center	Richlands, Tazewell County		200		LifePoint Health	
Cumberland Hospital	New Kent, New Kent County		84		Private, nonprofit	Children's hospital
Dickenson Community Hospital	Clintwood, Dickenson County				Ballad Health	Critical access hospital
Dominion Hospital	Falls Church		116		HCA Healthcare	Psychiatric hospital
Fauquier Health System	Warrenton, Fauquier County		97		LifePoint Hospitals	
Graydon Manor	Leesburg, Loudoun County				Private, nonprofit	Intermediate residential facility; drug or alcohol rehabilitation, mental health
Henrico Doctors' Hospital—Henrico Campus	Richmond		767	Level II	HCA Healthcare	
Henrico Doctors' Hospital—Parham Campus	Richmond				HCA Healthcare	Formerly HealthSouth Medical Center
Inova Alexandria Hospital	Alexandria		318		Inova Health System	
Inova Children's Hospital	Falls Church		226		Inova Health System	226 hospital (108 NICU, 26 PICU, 22 PCU & ICU, 48 surgical, 22 hematology/oncology)
Inova Fair Oaks Hospital	Fairfax		182		Inova Health System	
Inova Fairfax Hospital	Falls Church		923	Level I	Inova Health System, Georgetown Medical School, George Washington University Medical School	
Inova Loudoun Hospital	Leesburg, Loudoun County		183	Level III	Inova Health System	
Inova Mount Vernon Hospital	Hybla Valley, Fairfax County		237		Inova Health System	
Inova Women's Hospital	Falls Church				Inova Health System	
John Randolph Medical Center	Hopewell		112		Hospital Corporation of America	
Johnston Memorial Hospital	Abingdon, Washington County		116		Ballad Health	
Lake Taylor Transitional Care Hospital	Norfolk		296		Private, nonprofit	Rehabilitation hospital
LewisGale Hospital Alleghany	Low Moor, Alleghany County		110		HCA Healthcare	Formerly Alleghany Regional Hospital
LewisGale Hospital Montgomery	Blacksburg, Montgomery County		146	Level III	HCA Healthcare	Formerly Montgomery Regional Hospital
LewisGale Hospital Pulaski	Pulaski, Pulaski County		42		HCA Healthcare	Formerly Pulaski Community Hospital
LewisGale Medical Center	Salem		521	Level II	HCA Healthcare	
Martinsville Memorial Hospital	Martinsville		237		LifePoint Health	
Mary Washington Hospital	Fredericksburg		437	Level II	Mary Washington Healthcare	
Mountain View Regional Medical Center	Norton		98		Wellmont Health System	
Naval Medical Center Portsmouth	Portsmouth			Level II	Department of Defense	
Norton Community Hospital	Norton		129		Ballad Health	
Page Memorial Hospital	Luray, Page County		15		Valley Health	Critical access hospital
Pioneer Community Hospital of Patrick	Stuart, Patrick County				Private, nonprofit	Critical access hospital, closed as of 2018
Poplar Springs Hospital	Petersburg				Private, nonprofit	Psychiatric hospital
Rappahannock General Hospital	Kilmarnock, Lancaster and Northumberland Counties				Bon Secours Health System (USA)	
Reston Hospital Center	Reston, Fairfax County		187	Level II	HCA Healthcare	
Retreat Doctors' Hospital	Richmond		116		HCA Healthcare	Affiliated as a campus of Henrico Doctors' Hospital
Riverside Behavioral Health Center	Hampton				Riverside Health System	
Riverside Doctors' Hospital Williamsburg	Williamsburg		40		Riverside Health System	
Riverside Regional Medical Center	Newport News		215	Level II	Riverside Health System	
Riverside Rehabilitation Institute	Newport News				Riverside Health System	
Riverside Shore Memorial Hospital	Onancock, Accomack County		130		Riverside Health System	
Riverside Tappahannock Hospital	Tappahannock, Essex County		67		Riverside Health System	
Riverside Walter Reed Hospital	Gloucester, Gloucester		67		Riverside Health System	
Russell County Medical Center	Lebanon, Russell County		50		Ballad Health	Sold to Mountain States Health Alliance in 2008
Sentara CarePlex Hospital	Hampton		144		Sentara	
Sentara Halifax Regional Hospital	South Boston, Halifax		80		Sentara	Formerly Halifax Regional Hospital
Sentara Leigh Hospital	Norfolk		238		Sentara	
Sentara Martha Jefferson Hospital	Charlottesville		176		Sentara	
Sentara Norfolk General Hospital	Norfolk		563	Level I	Sentara, Eastern Virginia Medical School	
Sentara Northern Virginia Medical Center	Woodbridge, Prince William County		183	Level III	Sentara	Formerly Potomac Hospital
Sentara Obici Hospital	Suffolk		168		Sentara	
Sentara Princess Anne Hospital	Virginia Beach		160		Sentara	
Sentara RMH Medical Center	Harrisonburg		238		Sentara	Formerly Rockingham Memorial Hospital
Sentara Virginia Beach General Hospital	Virginia Beach		276	Level III	Sentara	
Sentara Williamsburg Regional Medical Center	Williamsburg		145		Sentara	
Shenandoah Memorial Hospital	Woodstock, Shenandoah County		20		Valley Health	Critical access hospital
Smyth County Community Hospital	Marion, Smyth County		44		Ballad Health	
Sovah Health - Danville	Danville		250		LifePoint Health	
Spotsylvania Regional Medical Center	Fredericksburg		133		HCA Healthcare	
Stafford Hospital	Stafford, Stafford County		83		Mary Washington Healthcare	Opened 2009
StoneSprings Hospital Center	Dulles, Loudoun County		124		HCA Healthcare	
Twin County Regional Healthcare	Galax		78		LifePoint Health	
UVA Children's	Charlottesville		111		UVA Health	
UVA Health Culpeper Medical Center	Culpeper	Culpeper County	70		UVA Health	Acquired by UVA in October 2014
UVA Health Haymarket Medical Center	Haymarket, Prince William County		60		UVA Health	
UVA Health Prince William Medical Center	Manassas		170		UVA Health	
UVA Health University Hospital	Charlottesville		645	Level I	UVA Health	
VCU Health Community Memorial Hospital	South Hill, Mecklenburg County		260		VCU Health	
VCU Medical Center	Richmond		865	Level I	VCU Health	
Virginia Hospital Center	Arlington		342	Level II	Private, nonprofit	
Warren Memorial Hospital	Front Royal, Warren County		46		Valley Health	
Wellmont Lonesome Pine Mt. View Hospital	Big Stone Gap, Wise County		21		Ballad Health	
Winchester Medical Center	Winchester		429	Level II	Valley Health	
Wythe County Community Hospital	Wytheville, Wythe County		20		LifePoint Health	
