= Bon Secours St. Francis Downtown Hospital =

Bon Secours St. Francis Downtown
- Bon Secours (Virginia & South Carolina)

Geography
- Location: Greenville, South Carolina, United States
- Coordinates: 34°50′24″N 82°25′26″W

Organization
- Religious affiliation: Catholic
- Network: Bon Secours Mercy Health

Services
- Emergency department: Yes
- Beds: 245

Helipads
- Helipad: yes

History
- Opened: 1921

Links
- Website: www.bonsecours.com/locations/hospitals-medical-centers/greenville/st-francis-downtown
- Lists: Hospitals in South Carolina

Bon Secours St. Francis Downtown Hospital is located in Greenville, South Carolina, and operated by Bon Secours, part of Bon Secours Mercy Health.

== History ==
Bon Secours St. Francis Downtown Hospital's history begins with the construction of Emma Moss Booth Hospital. Emma Moss Booth Hospital was built in 1921 by the Salvation Army and local textile executives to serve the workers of the local textile mills. The hospital closed during the Great Depression in 1931 and the Sisters of St. Francis were asked to take over management. The hospital reopened in 1932 under the name St. Francis.

In 2000, with the population of the Sisters of St. Francis declining, the order turned the hospital over to Bon Secours Health System.

== Facilities ==
Bon Secours St. Francis Downtown Hospital includes a 245-bed facility and the St. Francis Outpatient Center. It offers a wide range of services including emergency services, heart care, heart surgery, inpatient cancer services, bone marrow transplantation, orthopedic surgery, osteoporotic fracture program, spine surgery, neurosurgery, radiology and imaging services, sleep center, outpatient surgery and laboratory services.
