= St. Mary's Hospital (Richmond) =

Hospital in Virginia, US

Coordinates: 37°35′03.1″N 77°30′45.9″W

Bon Secours St. Mary's Hospital
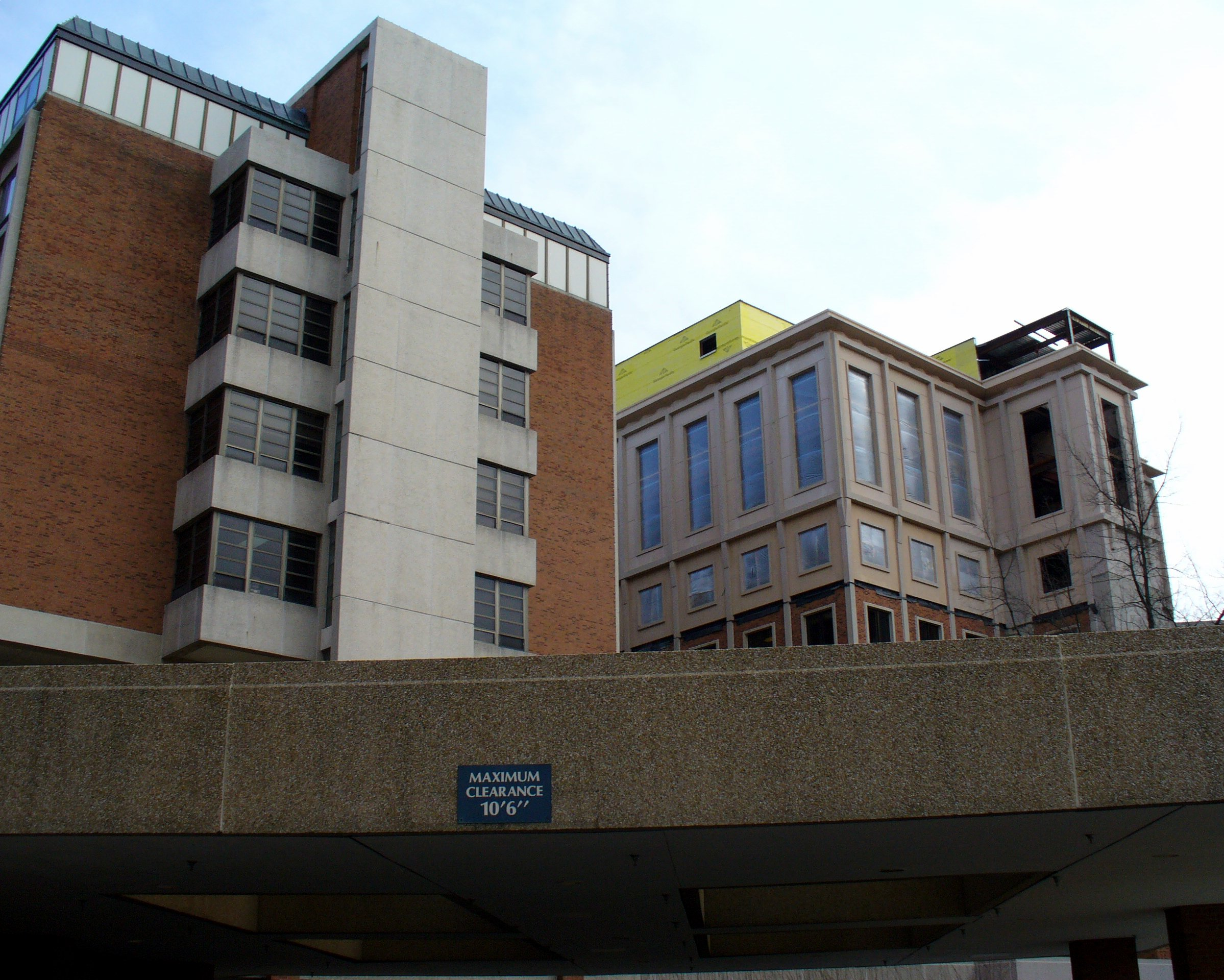

Geography
- Location: 5801 Bremo Road, Richmond, Virginia, United States

Organization
- Network: Bon Secours

Services
- Beds: 391

Helipads
- Helipad: Yes, 37VA

History
- Founded: 1966

Links
- Website: www.bonsecours.com/locations/hospitals-medical-centers/richmond/st-marys-hospital
- Lists: Hospitals in Virginia

Bon Secours St. Mary's Hospital is a private, non-for-profit hospital in the west end of Richmond, Virginia. It is a 391-bed hospital and serves the Central Virginia community and beyond. St. Mary's is affiliated with the Bon Secours Richmond Health System and the Sisters of Bon Secours.

== History ==
Under the guidance of the Sisters of Bon Secours, St. Mary's opened its doors in 1966. Over the years, the hospital expanded to help serve the community, growing from an initial size of 169 beds and only 250 employees.

== Services ==
St. Mary's offers a number of specialized services to the Richmond community. The hospital is accredited by The Joint Commission for having centers of excellence in heart failure, heart attack, and hip and knee joint replacement, and for its primary stroke center. It's also a center of excellence for surgical weight loss surgery and breast imaging.

St. Mary's is well known in Richmond for its birthing center, with Style Magazine readers voting it the "Best Place in Richmond to Have a Baby." In addition, the hospital has introduced a Pediatric Emergency Department to better serve the community. In 2014, the Evelyn D. Reinhart Guest House was opened to help serve patients and caregivers who live far from the hospital. The Guest House was built largely thanks to donations and is located within walking distance of St. Mary's. Patients and caregivers who live far away from the hospital are referred and stay in this "home away from home" to help begin the healing process.
