= Bon Secours St. Francis Medical Center =

- Bon Secours (Virginia & South Carolina)

Geography
- Location: Midlothian, Virginia, United States
- Coordinates: 37°27′59″N 77°39′42″W

Organization
- Type: General
- Religious affiliation: Catholic
- Network: Bon Secours Mercy Health

Services
- Emergency department: Yes
- Beds: 185

Helipads
- Helipad: Yes, VG68

History
- Opened: 2005

Links
- Website: www.bonsecours.com/locations/hospitals-medical-centers/richmond/st-francis-medical-center
- Lists: Hospitals in Virginia

Bon Secours St. Francis Medical Center is a General Acute Care Hospital in Midlothian, Virginia operated by Bon Secours, part of Bon Secours Mercy Health.

== History ==
Bon Secours St. Francis Medical Center opened in 2005.

In January, 2022 construction began on a $108 million expansion. The project was completed in the Summer of 2024.

== Facilities ==
Bon Secours St. Francis Downtown Hospital includes is a 185-bed facility with specialty services that include Cardiology, Oncology, Neurology, Orthopedics, Psychiatry, Pulmonology, Urology and Vascular Surgery and General Surgery.

The 2024 expansion included:

- Expansion of obstetrical beds from 21 to 29 beds
- Expansion of intensive care beds from 16 to 24 beds
- Expansion of NICU from 10 open bays to 11 private rooms and three bays
- Expansion of medical/surgical services by adding 24 new medical/surgical beds
- Expansion of an intermediate care unit (15 additional beds)
- Addition of a new outpatient pharmacy as well as a new inpatient pharmacy
- Expansion of an outpatient pre-admission testing center
- Relocation of an open MRI to the hospital campus, the only Bon Secours open MRI south of the James River
- The expansion also included the addition of 10 observation beds which allow for clinical care to be provided on a dedicated unit, reducing the number of observation patients occupying a licensed inpatient bed.
