= Mary Washington Hospital =

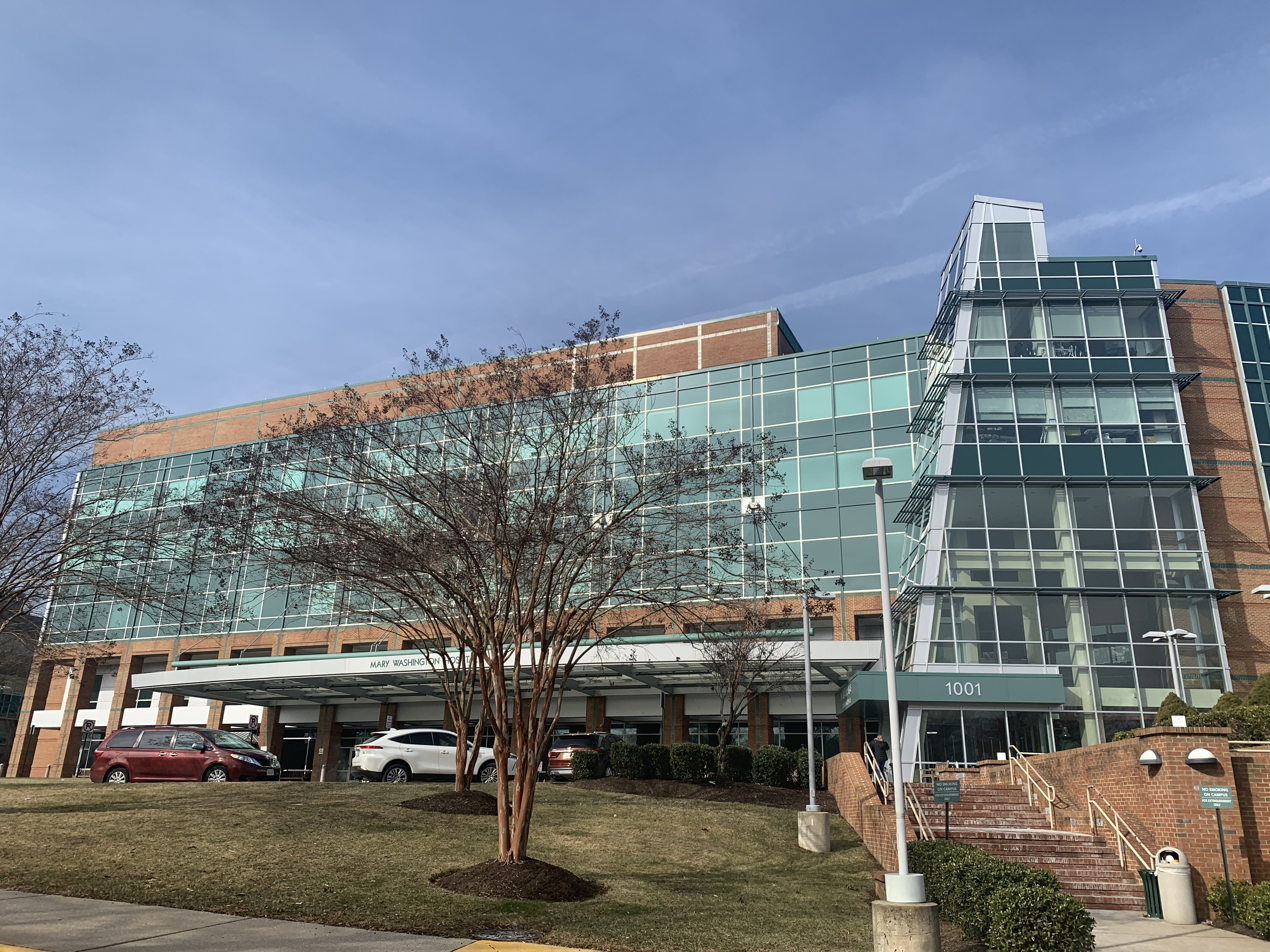
- Front entrance of Mary Washington Hospital, 2022

Geography
- Location: Fredericksburg, Virginia, United States
- Coordinates: 38.31099°N 77.48355°W

Services
- Emergency department: Level II trauma center
- Beds: 451

Links
- Lists: Hospitals in Virginia

Mary Washington Hospital is a 451-bed, full-service hospital in Fredericksburg, Virginia. It is one of seven level II trauma centers in Virginia and is ranked as the 9th best in the state by U.S. News and World Report

== History ==
In 1942 the hospital was evacuated during a flood of the Rappahanock River.

In 1978 it was investigated for violating the Hill Burton Act.
