= Bon Secours Richmond Community Hospital =

- Bon Secours (Virginia & South Carolina)

Geography
- Location: Richmond, Virginia, United States
- Coordinates: 37°32′25″N 77°24′26″W

Organization
- Religious affiliation: Catholic
- Network: Bon Secours Mercy Health

Services
- Emergency department: Yes
- Beds: 104

History
- Opened: 1995

Links
- Website: www.bonsecours.com/locations/hospitals-medical-centers/richmond/richmond-community-hospital
- Lists: Hospitals in Virginia

Bon Secours Richmond Community Hospital is a 104-bed, short-term acute care, non-profit hospital in Richmond, Virginia. It is owned and operated by Bon Secours, part of Bon Secours Mercy Health.

== History ==
In 1902, a group of Black physicians and nurses formed a hospital committee. The formation of this committee was led by Sarah Garland Jones. She was the first woman and the first Black person certified to practice medicine by the Virginia State Board of Medicine.

The hospital was called Richmond Hospital and was located at 406 E. Baker St. in Jackson Ward. It was the first facility in Richmond designed to serve African American patients. The hospital had 25 beds and mainly served female patients. It was also known as Women's Central Hospital.

After Jones passed in 1905, the hospital slowly began to fall into disrepair until a group of 21 black physicians teamed together in 1932 to rejuvenate and relocate the hospital in Richmond's Church Hill district. After 1945, it was known as Richmond Community Hospital. In 1980, the hospital was once again relocated, this time to Richmond's East End. Bon Secours acquired the hospital in 1995. Initially, the sale allowed the hospital to thrive, but under-investment by the group led the hospital to fail to thrive.

== Facilities ==
Bon Secours Richmond Community Hospital has 104 beds. Clinical services include Cardiology, Orthopedics, Radiology, Surgery, Wound Care and an Emergency Department.
