= Bon Secours - Southside Medical Center =

Hospital in Petersburg, Virginia, U.S.

Coordinates: 37.1823°N 77.3597°W

- Bon Secours (Virginia & South Carolina)

Geography
- Location: Petersburg, Virginia, United States

Services
- Emergency department: Level III trauma center
- Beds: 300

Helipads
- Helipad: 66VG

Links
- Website: www.bonsecours.com/locations/hospitals-medical-centers/richmond/southside-regional-medical-center
- Lists: Hospitals in the United States

Bon Secours - Southside Medical Center is a 300-bed hospital in Petersburg, Virginia, United States.

== History ==
The hospital was originally started in 1948 by the city of Petersburg, but was sold to Community Health Systems (a conglomerate based in Tennessee) in 2003 and relocated.

Bon Secours acquired the hospital in 2019 as part of a 3-hospital deal.

== Facilities ==
Bon Secours - Southside Medical Center is designated as a Level III Trauma Center by the Virginia Department of Health.

Specialty Services include Cardiology, Neurosciences, Oncology, Orthopedics, Radiology, Wound Care and an Emergency Department.

== Hospital rating data ==
The LeapFrog group recently rated the hospital with a B rating overall.

== Southside College of Health Sciences ==
The Southside College of Health Sciences is a nursing school managed by Bon Secours, located at the Southside Medical Center.

The history of Southside College of Health Sciences (SCHS) began as a nursing school, founded by Miss Lelia Nevins Ions as The Petersburg Training School for Nurses in 1895, which was created to bring nursing care to the Petersburg Home for the Sick; the hospital that served the city in the late 1800’s and later become the Petersburg Hospital.

The College expanded to include Radiologic Technology during the 1950’s as the development of sophisticated technology in radiography caused a greater need for technologists with a strong clinical background and added a Diagnostic Medical Sonography program in 2008.
