= Mercy College of Ohio =

Catholic nursing school in Toledo and Youngstown, Ohio, US

Coordinates: 41.6588°N 83.5523°W

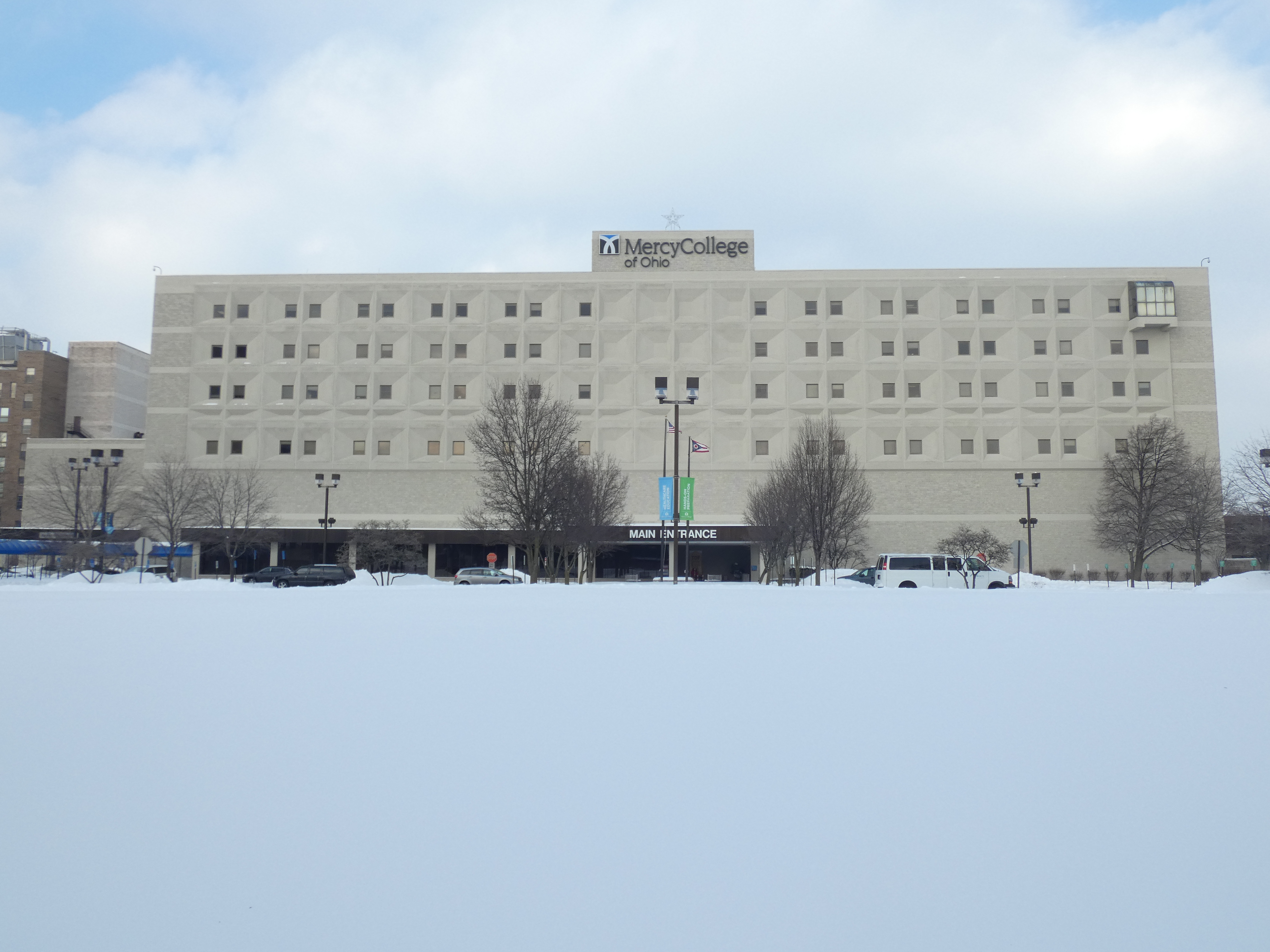
- Toledo, Ohio campus of the institution
- Former names: Mercy School of Nursing; Mercy College of Northwest Ohio
- Type: Private university
- Religious affiliation: Roman Catholic
- Students: 1,048
- Location: Toledo, Ohio, United States

Mercy College of Ohio is a private Catholic university in Toledo, Ohio, United States. It was founded as the Mercy School of Nursing in 1918 by the Sisters of Mercy. The name was changed in August 2011 from Mercy College of Northwest Ohio to its current name. Mercy College is accredited by the Higher Learning Commission. Mercy College is part of the Mercy Health system and provides healthcare education through in-person and online classes. In September 2018, Mercy College and Bowling Green State University announced the start of a two-to-three-year process under which the college and its degree programs will become part of the university. In 2019 they instead chose to pursue a strategic partnership.
