= Bon Secours (Virginia & South Carolina) =

Healthcare organization

Bon Secours is a subsidiary of Bon Secours Mercy Health. It operates hospitals and healthcare facilities in the US states of Virginia and South Carolina.

Bon Secours operates three hospitals and medical centers and one outpatient facility in Hampton Roads. The Bon Secours Richmond Health System has seven practices.

On September 1, 2018, Bon Secours and Mercy Health combined to become the United States' fifth-largest Catholic healthcare ministry and one of the nation's 20 largest healthcare systems. The two systems and their hospitals retained their pre-merger names and branding. The full name of the combined health system is Bon Secours Mercy Health. Bon Secours Mercy Health headquarters are co-located with Mercy Health in Cincinnati, Ohio.

== Background ==
The Congregation of the Sisters of Bon Secours ("good help" in English) was established in 1824 in Paris. Their particular apostolate was providing in-home care for the sick and dying. In 1881, the sisters came to Baltimore at the request of James Cardinal Gibbons. They founded their first hospital in Baltimore in 1919. By 1980, they had founded or managed several more. Bon Secours was established in 1983 to coordinate the administration and management of the various healthcare facilities.

Throughout the 1980s, the Bon Secours grew rapidly, opening a number of hospitals, community health clinics, nursing care facilities for the elderly, alcohol and drug abuse rehabilitation centers, affordable housing units, and medical office facilities in Maryland, Virginia, Florida, and Michigan in response to the needs of the communities they served.

== Hospitals ==
=== South Carolina ===
- Bon Secours St. Francis Downtown Hospital, Greenville
- Bon Secours St. Francis Eastside Hospital, Greenville

==== Freestanding emergency departments ====
- Bon Secours St. Francis Emergency Center at Simpsonville, Simpsonville, South Carolina. The 8,000-square-foot emergency department was opened in April 2023, after the surrounding area experienced more than 34% population growth from 2010 to 2019.
- Bon Secours Five Forks Emergency Center, Simpsonville. Opened in February 2026, the 12,500-square-foot emergency center was built for $23 million. The center offers 24-hour emergency medical service.

=== Virginia ===
- Bon Secours Harbour View Medical Center, Suffolk.
- Bon Secours Mary Immaculate Hospital, Newport News.
- Bon Secours Maryview Medical Center, Portsmouth.
- Bon Secours Memorial Regional Medical Center, Mechanicsville.
- Bon Secours St. Francis Medical Center, Midlothian.
- Bon Secours St. Mary's Hospital, Richmond.
- Bon Secours Richmond Community Hospital, Richmond.
- Bon Secours Southern Virginia Medical Center, Emporia.
- Bon Secours Southside Medical Center, Petersburg.
- Bon Secours Southampton Medical Center, Franklin.

==== Freestanding emergency departments ====
- Bon Secours Ashland Emergency Center, Ashland. Opened in December 2025.
- Bon Secours Chester Emergency Center, Chester. Opened in 2022.
- Bon Secours Short Pump Emergency Center, Henrico. Opened in September 2018.

== Former facilities ==
=== Kentucky ===
- Our Lady of Bellefonte Hospital, Ashland

=== Maryland ===
- Grace Medical Center, Baltimore – known as Bon Secours Hospital from 1919 until its sale in 2019

=== Massachusetts ===
- Bon Secours Hospital, Methuen – opened in 1950, sold to Caritas Christi Health Care in 1988, and renamed Holy Family Hospital

=== Michigan ===
- Bon Secours Grosse Pointe – sold in the early 2000s to Beaumont Health System

=== Pennsylvania ===
- Bon Secours-Holy Family Hospital, Altoona – merged into Altoona Regional Health System in 2004, closed 2012

=== Virginia ===
- Bon Secours DePaul Medical Center closed in 2021.
