= Riverside Health =

Healthcare organization in Virginia, US

- Type: Non-profit organization
- Industry: Health care
- Founded: 1915
- Headquarters: Newport News, Virginia, United States
- Key people: Michael J. Dacey, M.D. President/CEO; Thomas M. Kayrouz, M.D. EVP/CCO; Frankye Myers, MSN, RN, NE-BC; SVP/CNO; W. William (Bill) Austin Jr., CPA; EVP/CFO
- Number of employees: 9,500
- Website: Riverside Health

Riverside Health is a health network that has been operating in Eastern Virginia since 1915. It offers numerous health services and programs including: disease prevention, primary care, diagnostics, neurosciences, oncology, orthopedics, aging-related services, rehabilitation, medical education, home care, and hospice.

== Operations ==
Riverside Health operates acute care hospitals, as well as behavioral health, physical rehabilitation, and critical illness recovery hospitals (the former in partnership with Select Medical). Riverside Lifelong Health operates six nursing home facilities and three continuing care retirement communities, as well as home health and hospice services. Additionally, Riverside operates the College of Health Careers and four medical residency training programs.

Riverside operates eight clinical facilities: four acute care hospitals and four specialty hospitals:

- Riverside Regional Medical Center (Newport News, VA)
- Riverside Walter Reed Hospital (Gloucester, VA)
- Riverside Shore Memorial Hospital (Onancock, VA)
- Riverside Doctors' Hospital Williamsburg (Williamsburg, VA)
- Riverside Smithfield Hospital (Smithfield, VA)
- Riverside Rehabilitation Hospital (Yorktown, VA)
- Riverside Mental Health & Recovery Center (Hampton, VA)
- Select Specialty Hospital - Hampton Roads (Newport News, VA)

=== Riverside Medical Group ===
Riverside Medical Group is a large multi-specialty group practice in the state of Virginia. It operates at 132 locations across Eastern Virginia. Riverside Medical Group was among the first provider groups to use electronic medical records and follows a multidisciplinary approach to care.

=== Riverside College of Health Sciences ===
Riverside College of Health Sciences offers programs in nursing aide, practical nursing, professional nursing, and the RN-to-bachelor of science in Nursing programs. All graduates are eligible to sit for their respective licensing exams.

=== Riverside Foundation ===
The Riverside Foundation has programs in cancer care, education and lifelong health.
