= Bon Secours Memorial Regional Medical Center =

- Bon Secours (Virginia & South Carolina)
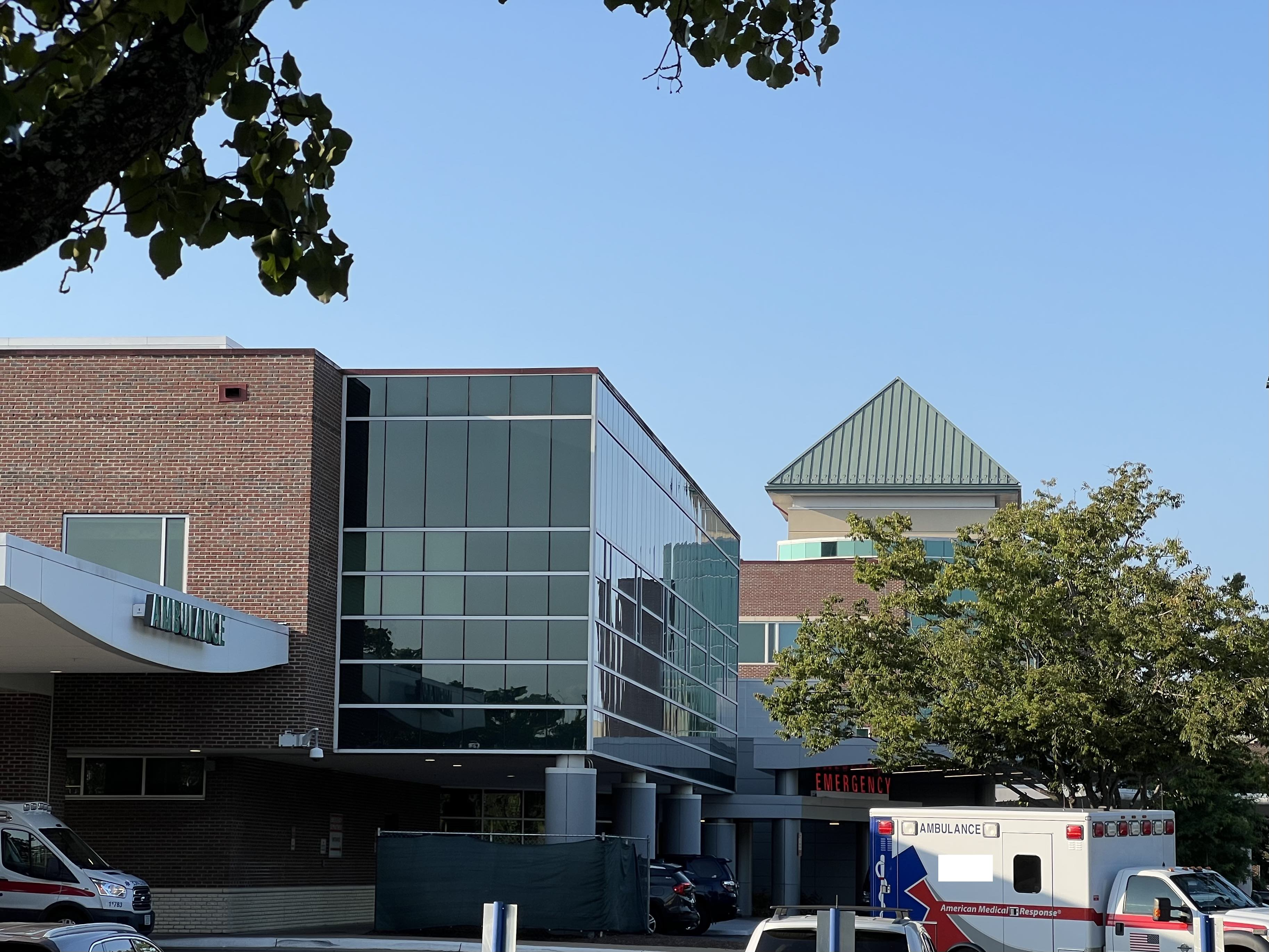

Geography
- Location: Mechanicsville, Virginia, United States
- Coordinates: 37°37′43″N 77°23′10″W

Organization
- Religious affiliation: Catholic
- Network: Bon Secours Mercy Health

Services
- Emergency department: Yes
- Beds: 269

Helipads
- Helipad: yes

History
- Opened: 1998

Links
- Website: bonsecours.com
- Lists: Hospitals in Virginia

Bon Secours Memorial Regional Medical Center is located in Mechanicsville, Virginia and operated by Bon Secours, part of Bon Secours Mercy Health.

== History ==
Memorial Regional Medical Center opened in 1998. The hospital developed out of Richmond Memorial Hospital, built in 1958 and closed in 1998; upon its closure, it was absorbed and patients and practices were moved to the new Bon Secours Memorial Regional Medical Center.

== Facilities ==
Memorial Regional Medical Center is a General Acute Care Hospital with 269 beds. Specialty services include Obstetrics, Cardiology, a Wound Care Center and a 24-hour emergency department.

In 2020, the Virginia Department of Health approved plans to expand the hospital and add an additional 44 beds. The expansion began in October, 2021.
