= Bon Secours Maryview Medical Center =

- Bon Secours (USA)

Geography
- Location: 3636 High St., Portsmouth, Virginia, United States
- Coordinates: 36.836204966798675°N 76.3473494618147°W

Services
- Emergency department: Yes
- Beds: 346

Links
- Website: Bon Secours Maryview Medical Center
- Lists: Hospitals in Virginia

Bon Secours Maryview Medical Center is a 346-bed non-profit hospital in Portsmouth, Virginia. The hospital is managed by Bon Secours Health System (USA).

== History ==
Maryview has been at the same High Street location since its dedication on March 4, 1945.

The need for a new medical facility in Portsmouth was critical when World War II brought thousands of shipyard workers and their families to the area in the early 1940s. The hospital was initially called Glensheallah Hospital and was funded by the Federal Government. After the war, the government sold the hospital for $85,000 to the Catholic Church's Diocese of Richmond, which agreed to operate the hospital with the Daughters of Wisdom.

After considering both ``Glensheallah'' and ``Glenmary'' as possible names for the hospital, the Daughters of Wisdom settled on the name ``Maryview'' to honor the Virgin Mary and the Waterview area adjacent to the hospital.

In 1984, Maryview's sponsorship was transferred from the Diocese of Richmond to the Sisters of Bon Secours Health Systems, Inc. in Marriottsville, Md., and the hospital became part of the Bon Secours Health Network.

Upon the closing of Portsmouth General Hospital, its former hospital services were gradually transferred to Maryview and Bon Secours Health Center at Harbour View in Suffolk between 1996 and 1999.

== Facilities ==
Bon Secours Maryview Medical Center is a 346-bed short-term acute care facility. Clinical services include Cardiology, Oncology, Neurosciences, Orthopedics, Radiology and an Emergency Department.

Maryview Hospital does not offer an FAA controlled helipad, but there is an emergency landing zone for helicopters just North of the hospital.

== See also ==
- Bon Secours DePaul Medical Center, also in Hampton Roads, Virginia
