= Bon Secours Sisters =

Roman Catholic religious congregation

- Congregation of the Sisters of Bon Secours
- Abbreviation: C.B.S.
- Formation: c. 1824; 202 years ago
- Founder: Josephine Potel
- Type: Catholic religious order
- Headquarters: France
- Website: bonsecours.org

The Congregation of the Sisters of Bon Secours is an international Roman Catholic women's religious congregation for nursing (gardes malades), whose declared mission is to care for those who are sick and dying. It was founded by Josephine Potel in 1824, in Paris, France. While the Congregation's stated object is to care for patients from all socio-economic groups, in some territories they only operate for-profit private hospitals. Reflecting their name ("bon secours" means "good help" in French), the Congregation's motto is "Good Help to Those in Need".

Initially active in France, the sisters tended the wounded during the Revolution of 1848 and the 1870 Franco-Prussian War, and the sick during the 1893 cholera epidemic in Boulogne-Sur-Mer. In 1832, at the request of the Archbishop of Boulogne, they took charge of an orphanage. Their work expanded to both other countries and other areas of service. The Congregation expanded to Ireland (1861), England (1870), the United States (1881), Scotland (1948), Chad (1957), Peru (1966), and Tanzania (2006).

A separate system was formed in 1993 to coordinate the health care facilities managed by the sisters in Ireland. In 2019, Bon Secours Health System of Dublin merged with Bon Secours Mercy Health of Cincinnati, Ohio. "Together, the health systems have 60,000 employees serving more than 10.5 million people through nearly 50 hospitals, more than 50 home health agencies and senior health and housing facilities."

While the Congregation's historic motherhouse remains in Paris, its international headquarters is in Marriotsville, Maryland, United States.

In 2014, it was reported that the bodies of up to 796 children under the care of the Congregation had been disposed of in a structure built within a decommissioned sewage tank at the Tuam Mother and Baby Home, which the Sisters of Bon Secours ran in Tuam, Ireland. Excavations in 2017 found an "underground structure divided into 20 chambers", containing the remains of children up to three years old. Examination of the remains found that they dated from the late 1930s through to the 1950s. Data from the National Archives of Ireland from 1947 showed that the death rate of children in Bon Secours during the preceding twelve months was almost twice that of some other mother and baby homes. A full forensic investigation commenced in July 2025.

== History ==
=== The founder ===
The Congregation's founder, Josephine Potel, was born on March 14, 1799, in the small rural village of Bécordel in northern France. At the age of 22, she traveled to Paris and was moved to pity by the suffering she observed. At that time, France had been shaken by centuries of political, social, and religious upheaval — including, most recently, the French Revolution. The violence of the Revolution — particularly the Reign of Terror – had taken many lives and destroyed the fabric of French society.

With poverty rampant among France's lower class, healthcare for the poor was scarce and low-quality. When people fell ill or were injured, they avoided the hospitals, which were seen as death traps and often had filthy, prison-like conditions. Care, if available at all, was usually provided by a family member with little or no experience caring for the sick. With overcrowding and a lack of sanitation, diseases spread quickly through city streets, afflicting rich and poor alike.

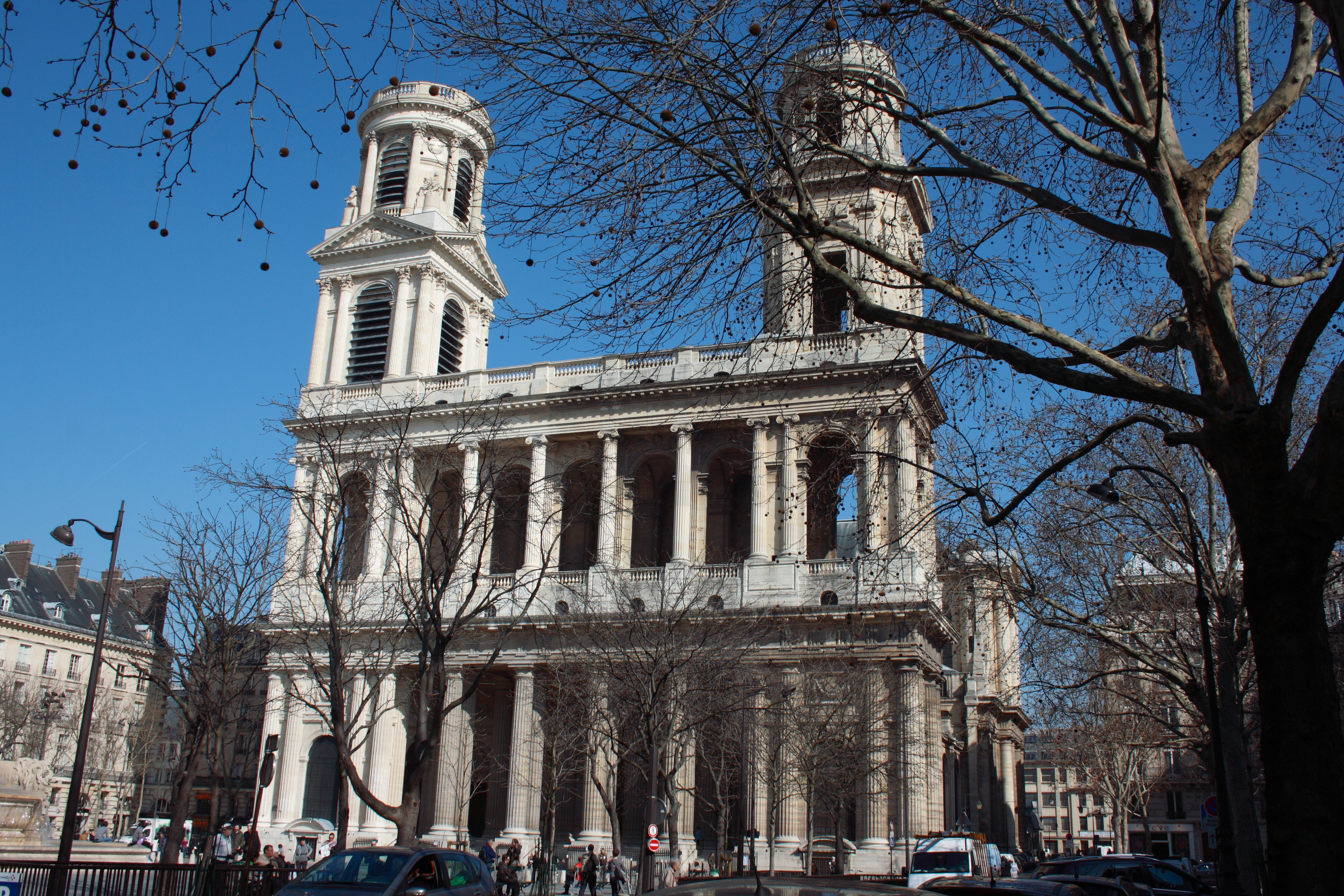
Saint-Sulpice, Paris

Potel and eleven other women formed the group that would become the Sisters of Bon Secours. They chose Potel, who had taken the religious name "Sister Marie-Joseph", as their leader for her dedication to the seemingly endless work, and her ability to encourage and guide others. Contemporary norms held that nuns were supposed to either remain in the convent or at least return by nightfall if they ventured out into the world. Consequently, when the Sisters applied for acceptance of their new Congregation, Archbishop de Quélen of Paris was skeptical. After persistent efforts by Potel, the Archbishop eventually granted the Sisters a one-year probationary period. According to their founding constitution, "...the principal aim of this pious society is the care of the sick in their own homes". The group was formally approved by Pope Pius IX in 1875. Our Lady Help of Christians is their patron.

=== Early days ===
Although its patients were expected to pay as much as they could afford, the congregation provided nursing free of charge to the poor.

Word of the Sisters' work spread quickly throughout Paris and the surrounding countryside, and the Congregation were sought out by other women inspired by them to join. By the end of its first year, the Congregation had eighteen new members, bringing its number to thirty. On January 24, 1824, de Quelen accepted their vows and gave them the name of the Bon Secours Sisters of Paris. On May 6, 1826, Mother Josephine died. Three days later, on May 9, Angelique Geay was appointed Superior General, taking her predecessor's name.

=== Growth of the congregation's mission in France ===
The Sisters reached a major milestone in 1827, when the French Bourbon government legally recognized them as the first association of nursing religious individuals in the country. Following this milestone, the demand for the organization's services continued to grow. In 1829, Mere Geay established a new group of twelve sisters in Lille, and the following year the Sisters began a ministry in Boulogne. Three years later, at the Archbishop's request, the congregation took over an orphanage in Paris.

As the Sisters' numbers continued to grow, they moved in 1833 into a larger home in Paris. Meanwhile, France continued to be subject to epidemics, wars, and social upheaval. After the King of France was exiled during the Revolution of 1848, the former King's palace became a hospital where the Sisters cared for the wounded; they also tended to the injured on the streets of Paris. Similarly, during the Franco-Prussian War of 1870, the Sisters cared for the wounded and dying on the battlefield and brought them into their convents to convalesce. Although the sisters had been requested to take over care for the sick during the 1893 cholera epidemic in Boulogne-Sur-Mer, the congregation subsequently became a target of anti-clerical governments during the early 20th century.

=== Europe ===
In addition to extending their work around France, the Sisters of Bon Secours began to expand beyond the country's borders due to international demand for their services. In 1861, Dublin, Ireland became the Sisters' first foreign foundation. From their original convent on Granville Street, they provided visiting nurse services. Nine years later, the congregation was invited to establish themselves in London. The Sisters expanded to Scotland in 1948, opening a home nursing service, and also opening a home for the elderly in Glasgow. The independent Bon Secours Health System, one of largest hospital groups in Ireland, developed from the initial Bon Secours hospitals. It later merged with Bon Secours Mercy Health of Cincinnati, Ohio. In 2015, the for-profit Bon Secours Health System had about 2,700 staff who worked with 350 medical consultants and saw more than 200,000 patients, making €2.5 million in profit after paying €3 million to the order in rent.

=== North America ===
The Sisters of Bon Secours' arrival in America came about when an American couple, the Whedbys, were on their wedding trip in Paris and the bride fell ill. An English-speaking Bon Secours Sister nursed her back to health, and the couple was impressed with the care she provided. Upon returning to the States, the couple spoke to some prominent area physicians, who contacted Archbishop Gibbons of Baltimore to request that the Sisters be asked to practice their ministry in the United States. Approving of the request, while on his way to Rome to become a cardinal, Archbishop Gibbons stopped in Paris to ask the Sisters if they would be willing to provide their home care services in Baltimore. In 1881, three Sisters sailed to the United States, and in the following year they opened a convent in Baltimore on the site of the present Grace Medical Center. The Bon Secours established the first day care facility in Baltimore in 1907 to help working mothers. They came to Washington, D.C., in 1905 to provide healthcare during a typhoid epidemic. Their assistance was particularly beneficial during a Spanish flu outbreak after World War I.

In 1916, the Archbishop of Philadelphia, Edmond Francis Prendergast, established Saint Edmond's Home to meet the needs of children affected by the polio epidemic, and asked the Bon Secours Sisters in Connecticut to staff it. As hospitals became the preferred place of treatment, the Sisters broadened where they cared for the sick and dying. Soon the Sisters were building their own health care facilities.

In 1958, the Congregation of Bon Secours in the United States became a separate Province. As the twentieth century progressed, the sisters responded to people's changing needs, opening convalescent homes, running clinics and mobile health care vans, caring for the sick in rural areas and those struggling with addictions in inner cities. Bon Secours Health System was established in 1983 to coordinate the administration and management of the various healthcare facilities. The congregation hosts a Retreat & Conference Center in Marriottsville, Maryland.

=== Africa ===
The Sisters began to expand into the developing world, with work in South America and Africa. In 1957, the Sisters opened a home for sick children in Chad, working also to educate mothers and reduce the infant mortality rate. In 2006, they began to work in Tanzania.

=== South America ===
The Irish Sisters of Bon Secours first began the work South America after an invitation from the Cork Diocesan Mission at Trujillo, Peru in 1966. The invitation brought four sisters from Ireland who opened a mission in the coastal city. In 2017, the Bishop of Cork and Ross worked with the sisters to provide relief for a shantytown on the Peruvian coastline. In total, about forty Bon Secours sisters responded to provide emergency assistance over the course of the 2017 floods in Peru.

== Present day ==
The Congregation of Bon Secours is headquartered in Marriottsville, Maryland. As of 2020, the congregation works in France, Peru, the United Kingdom, and the United States, and Ireland. Within the U.S., the order operates in Florida, Maryland, Michigan, Pennsylvania, South Carolina, and Virginia. They work in the areas of healthcare, housing, and education.

In 2019, it was announced that LifeBridge Health was to acquire Bon Secours Baltimore Hospital. The Sisters continue to minister to the underserved of West Baltimore through Bon Secours Community Works, a collection of programs and services designed to address public health issues before they require the services of an acute-care facility.

== Bon Secours Mercy Health ==
When founded in Paris in 1824 the Sisters of Bon Secours were one of the first congregations of nursing sisters; its object was to nurse the sick in their own homes. In 1919, the Sisters opened the Bon Secours Hospital in Baltimore, Maryland, their first hospital in the U.S. They began formally training young women at the Bon Secours School of Nursing in 1921. Many more hospitals were established, as well as community health clinics, nursing care facilities for the elderly, alcohol and drug abuse rehabilitation centers and convalescent homes. Bon Secours Health System was established in 1983 to coordinate the administration and management of the various healthcare facilities in the United States. On September 1, 2018, Bon Secours and Mercy Health combined to become the United States' fifth largest Catholic health care ministry and one of the nation's 20 largest health care systems.

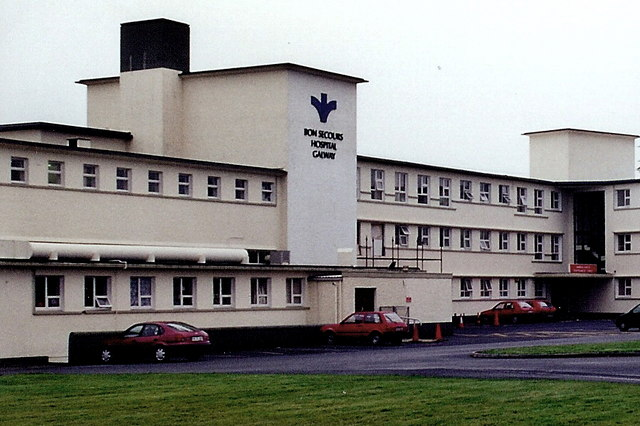
Bon Secours Hospital, Galway

Around 1861, the Sisters were invited to come to Ireland, and founded a house in Dublin. Bon Secours Hospital, Cork was established in 1915. This was a significant departure from their practice of home care. With 300 beds, it is the largest private hospital in Ireland; and is a teaching hospital affiliated with UCC (University College Cork). Other hospitals followed. A separate Bon Secours Health System was formed in 1993 to coordinate the health care facilities under one limited company. As of April 2019, Bon Secours Health System had five acute-care hospitals in Cork, Galway, Limerick, Tralee and Dublin as well as a long-term care facility in Cork.

In 2019, Bon Secours Health System of Dublin merged with Bon Secours Mercy Health of Cincinnati, Ohio. "Together, the health systems have 60,000 employees serving more than 10.5 million people through nearly 50 hospitals, more than 50 home health agencies and senior health and housing facilities."

== Tuam Children's Home controversy ==
Between 1925 and 1961, the Congregation operated the Bon Secours Mother and Baby Home, also known as "The Children's Home" in Tuam, Ireland. In 2014, news media reported that the bodies of 796 children and babies who died of malnutrition (including marasmus-related malnutrition) and disease were suspected to have been disposed off in a former septic tank on the site of the home. The child mortality rate at the home during certain local epidemics had averaged up to two a week. Medical reports at the time listed the cause of death as disease or disease-induced effects.

Catherine Corless, a community historian, had obtained death records for 796 children who had died of various diseases and malnutrition (including marasmus-related malnutrition) at the home — an overall rate of 22.1 per year between 1925 and 1961, and finding no trace of their burial in any of the local graveyards, she inferred that they probably were buried on the property. In 1975, two local boys had lifted a concrete slab and seen the skeletons of "maybe twenty" babies. While Corless speculates that the pit in which the skeletons lay may have been part of the sewage tank installed by the workhouse in 1840, eighty-five years before the Bon Secours sisters used it, she told the Irish Times, "I never used that word, 'dumped'. I never said to anyone that 800 bodies were 'dumped' in a septic tank. That did not come from me at any point. They are not my words. ... I just wanted those children to be remembered and for their names to go up on a plaque. That was why I did this project, and now it has taken [on] a life of its own." Still, figures for 1947 from the National Archives showed that the death rate of children in Bon Secours, during the preceding twelve months, was almost twice that of other mother and baby homes.

The death records obtained by Corless had established the identities of those who died in the home. She concluded that their bodies had been buried on the St. Mary's property, and she set up a fund to build a memorial for the site. Bon Secours sisters are said to have donated money for this purpose.

The area is labeled as a sewage tank when overlaid with maps from the earlier workhouse era, and had been decommissioned in the 1930s. A judicial Commission of Investigation commissioned an Expert Technical Group which found that "The human remains found by the Commission are not in a sewage tank but in a second structure with 20 chambers which was built within the decommissioned large sewage tank. The precise purpose of the chamber structure has not been established but it is likely to be related to the treatment/containment of sewage and/or waste water." "The Commission has also not yet determined if it was ever used for this purpose." Carbon dating confirmed that the remains date from the timeframe relevant to the operation of the Mother and Baby Home by the Bon Secours order. The Commission stated that it was shocked by the discovery and that it is continuing its investigation into who was responsible for the disposal of human remains in this way.

More excavation works formally began at Tuam in June 2025. Full-scale forensic recovery efforts commenced in mid-July.

=== Mother and Baby Homes Commission of Investigation ===
On 4 June 2014, the Irish government announced it was forming a panel of representatives from a number of government departments to investigate the deaths at the home and propose a course of action for the government to take in addressing the issues. Charles Flanagan, the then children's minister, said the inquiry would be charged with investigating burial practices, high mortality rates, forced adoptions and clinical trials of drugs on children in the home in Tuam and three other suspect homes.

On 3 June 2015, the Irish Examiner published a special report which stated that the Irish Health Services Executive had voiced concerns in 2012 that up to 1,000 children may have been trafficked from the Home, and recommending that the then health minister be informed so that "a fully fledged, fully resourced forensic investigation and State inquiry" could be launched. The issue had arisen within the HSE when a principal social worker responsible for adoption discovered "a large archive of photographs, documentation and correspondence relating to children sent for adoption to the USA" and "documentation in relation to discharges and admissions to psychiatric institutions in the Western area." The HSE noted that there were letters from the Home to parents asking for money for the upkeep of their children and notes that the duration of stay for children may have been prolonged by the order for financial reasons. It also uncovered letters to parents asking for money for the upkeep of some children who had already been discharged or had died. The social worker had compiled a list of "up to 1,000 names". HSE reports mentioned the possibility that children had been trafficked for adoption with one speculating that it was possible that death certificates were falsified so children could be "brokered" for adoption.

On 3 March 2017, the Mother and Baby Homes Commission of Investigation announced that human remains had been found during a test excavation carried out between November 2016 and February 2017 at the site. Tests conducted on some of the remains indicated they had been aged between 35 foetal weeks and 2–3 years. The announcement confirmed that the deceased died during the period of time that the property was used by the Tuam Children's Home, not from an earlier period, with most of the bodies dated to the 1950s. The remains were found in an "underground structure divided into 20 chambers", later determined to be a sewage tank.

The Commission stated that it was continuing its investigation into who was responsible for the disposal of human remains in this way, that it has also asked the relevant State authorities to take responsibility for the appropriate treatment of the remains, and that it has notified the coroner. Minister for Children, Katherine Zappone said that the coroner's results would determine the direction of the investigation and that the commission will determine if other sites need to be excavated, including another part of the Tuam site.

The Taoiseach (Irish prime minister), Enda Kenny, described the find as "truly appalling", saying "the babies of single mothers involved had been treated like some kind of sub-species." Speaking on the find in Dáil Éireann, in response to requests to widen the terms of reference of the Commission, he described the Mother and Baby Home as "a chamber of horrors".

In the same debate, AAA-PBP T.D. Bríd Smith called for the Bon Secours order of nuns to be disbanded. She said "its hospital empire, the biggest private hospital group in the [Irish] State, was built on the bones of the dead Tuam babies." Smith said "everyone was not responsible for what happened in Tuam. It was paid for by the State, which knew exactly what was going on, and there were 'headage payments' of up to $3,000 for each child sent to the United States."

The Roman Catholic Archbishop of Tuam, Michael Neary, said that he was horrified by the confirmation that significant quantities of human remains were buried on the site. He said he had been "greatly shocked to learn of the scale of the practice during the time in which the Bon Secours ran the mother and baby home in Tuam."

The Irish Roman Catholic Bishops' Conference apologised for the hurt caused by its part in the system, which they said also involved adoptions. They said that "the appalling story of life, death and adoptions related to the Mother and Baby Homes has shocked everyone in Ireland and beyond."

The President of Ireland, Michael D. Higgins, said "there are dark shadows that hang over our meeting, shadows that require us all to summon up yet again a light that might dispel the darkness to which so many women and their children were condemned, and the questions left unanswered as we moved on." President Higgins described Catherine Corless' work as "another necessary step in blowing open the locked doors of a hidden Ireland."

Following the publication of the Commission's final report on 12 January 2021, the Bon Secours Sisters released an apology. It states:

The Commission's report presents a history of our country in which many women and children were rejected, silenced and excluded; in which they were subjected to hardship; and in which their inherent human dignity was disrespected, in life and in death. Our Sisters of Bon Secours were part of this sorrowful history.

Our Sisters ran St Mary's Mother and Baby Home in Tuam from 1925 to 1961. We did not live up to our Christianity when running the Home. We failed to respect the inherent dignity of the women and children who came to the Home. We failed to offer them the compassion that they so badly needed. We were part of the system in which they suffered hardship, loneliness and terrible hurt. We acknowledge in particular that infants and children who died at the Home were buried in a disrespectful and unacceptable way. For all that, we are deeply sorry.

We offer our profound apologies to all the women and children of St Mary's Mother and Baby Home, to their families and to the people of this country.

Healing is not possible until what happened is acknowledged. We hope and we pray that healing will come to all those affected; those who are living and those who have died. We hope that we, our church and our country can learn from this history.

— Sr Eileen O'Connor, Area Leader, Sisters of Bon Secours Ireland,

The order also committed to participating in a "Restorative Recognition Scheme" to be set up to compensate survivors.

=== Grove Hospital ===
Some Tuam residents also called for an investigation into the town's Grove Hospital, which had also been run by the Bon Secours order. Several people stated that their children or siblings had been buried on the site between the 1950s and the late 1970s, although the order denied that there was a graveyard on the site. The Galway County Council required an archaeologist to monitor excavation work in order to preserve any remains which may be buried there.

== See also ==
- Bon Secours Health System
- Bon Secours Health System (USA)
- Convent de Bon Secours, an early-20th-century building in Washington, D.C.
