= List of hospitals in Kentucky =

This is a list of hospitals in Kentucky (U.S. state), sorted by hospital name.

| Hospital | County | City | Bed count | Type | Founded | Closed | Health system |
|---|---|---|---|---|---|---|---|
| AdventHealth Manchester (Manchester Memorial Hospital) | Clay | Manchester | 63 | General | 1917 | | AdventHealth |
| Albert B. Chandler Hospital | Fayette | Lexington | 1142 | Level I trauma center, teaching | 1962 | | UK HealthCare |
| ARH Our Lady of the Way Hospital | Floyd | Martin | 25 | General | 1947 | | Appalachian Regional Healthcare |
| Baptist Health Corbin | Whitley | Corbin | 241 | General | 1986 | | Baptist Health |
| Baptist Health Deaconess Madisonville | Hopkins | Madisonville | 248 | General | | | Baptist Health; Deaconess Health System |
| Baptist Health La Grange | Oldham | La Grange | 120 | General | 1987 | | Baptist Health |
| Baptist Health Lexington | Fayette | Lexington | 383 | General | 1954 | | Baptist Health |
| Baptist Health Louisville | Jefferson | Louisville | 519 | General | 1924 | | Baptist Health |
| Baptist Health Paducah | McCracken | Paducah | 295 | General | 1953 | | Baptist Health |
| Baptist Health Richmond | Madison | Richmond | 73 | General | | | Baptist Health |
| Bluegrass Community Hospital | Woodford | Versailles | 25 | General | 1904 | | LifePoint Health |
| Bourbon Community Hospital | Bourbon | Paris | 58 | General | | | LifePoint Health |
| Breckinridge Memorial Hospital | Breckinridge | Hardinsburg | 43 | General | | | Norton Healthcare |
| Caldwell Medical Center | Caldwell | Princeton | 25 | General | | | Western Kentucky Rural Healthcare Network |
| Cardinal Hill Rehabilitation Center | Fayette | Lexington | 232 | Rehabilitation | 1950 | | |
| Carroll County Memorial Hospital | Carroll | Carrollton | 25 | General | | | Norton Healthcare |
| Casey County Hospital | Casey | Liberty | 24 | General | | | Inspire Medical |
| Caverna Memorial Hospital | Hart | Horse Cave | 25 | General | 1967 | | |
| Central State Hospital | Jefferson | Louisville | 116 | Psychiatric | 1873 | | |
| Clark Regional Medical Center | Clark | Winchester | 79 | General | 1917 | | LifePoint Health |
| Clinton County Hospital | Clinton | Albany | 42 | General | | | |
| Commonwealth Regional Specialty Hospital | Warren | Bowling Green | 28 | General | | | Commonwealth Health |
| Crittenden County Hospital | Crittenden | Marion | 48 | General | 1944 | | Western Kentucky Rural Healthcare Network |
| Cumberland County Hospital | Cumberland | Burkesville | 25 | General | | | |
| Cumberland Hall Hospital | Christian | Hopkinsville | | Psychiatric | 1987 | | |
| Deaconess Hospital | Henderson | Henderson | 154 | General | | | |
| Deaconess Hospital Union County | Union | Morganfield | 41 | General | | | |
| Eastern State Hospital | Fayette | Lexington | 239 | Psychiatric | 1817 | | UK HealthCare |
| Ephraim McDowell Fort Logan Hospital | Lincoln | Stanford | 25 | General | | | Ephraim McDowell Health |
| Ephraim McDowell Regional Medical Center | Boyle | Danville | 222 | Level III trauma center | 1887 | | Ephraim McDowell Health |
| Flaget Memorial Hospital | Nelson | Bardstown | 52 | General | | | KentuckyOne Health |
| Fleming County Hospital | Fleming | Flemingsburg | 52 | General | 1962 | | LifePoint Health |
| Frankfort Regional Medical Center | Franklin | Frankfort | 173 | Level III trauma center | | | HCA Healthcare |
| Gateway Rehabilitation Hospital | Boone | Florence | 40 | Rehabilitation | | | |
| Georgetown Community Hospital | Scott | Georgetown | 75 | General | | | LifePoint Health |
| Good Samaritan Hospital | Fayette | Lexington | 302 | General | 1888 | | UK HealthCare |
| Baptist Health Hardin (formerly Hardin Memorial Hospital) | Hardin | Elizabethtown | 300 | General | | | Baptist Health |
| Harlan ARH Hospital | Harlan | Harlan | 150 | Level IV trauma center | | | Appalachian Regional Healthcare |
| Harrison Memorial Hospital | Harrison | Cynthiana | 61 | General | 1906 | | |
| Hazard ARH Regional Medical Center | Perry | Hazard | 308 | General; Psychiatric | | | Appalachian Regional Healthcare |
| HealthSouth Lakeview Rehabilitation Hospital | Hardin | Elizabethtown | 40 | Rehabilitation | | | |
| HealthSouth Northern Kentucky Rehabilitation Hospital | Kenton | Edgewood | 51 | Rehabilitation | | | |
| Highlands ARH Regional Medical Center | Floyd | Prestonsburg | 142 | General | | | Appalachian Regional Healthcare |
| Ireland Army Community Hospital | Hardin | Fort Knox | | General | | | |
| Jackson Purchase Medical Center | Graves | Mayfield | 107 | General | 1993 | | LifePoint Health |
| Jane Todd Crawford Memorial Hospital | Green | Greensburg | 25 | General | | | |
| Ephraim McDowell James B. Haggin Memorial Hospital | Mercer | Harrodsburg | 25 | General | 1913 | | |
| Jennie Stuart Medical Center | Christian | Hopkinsville | 194 | General | 1914 | | |
| Kentucky River Medical Center | Breathitt | Jackson | 55 | General | | | Community Health |
| Kindred Hospital Louisville | Jefferson | Louisville | 123 | General | | | Kindred Healthcare |
| King's Daughters Medical Center | Boyd | Ashland | 465 | General | 1897 | | UK HealthCare |
| Knox County Hospital | Knox | Barbourville | 25 | General | | | |
| Kosair Children's Hospital | Jefferson | Louisville | 300 | Level I pediatric trauma center | | | Norton Healthcare |
| Lake Cumberland Regional Hospital | Pulaski | Somerset | 295 | General | 1976 | | LifePoint Health |
| Lexington Shriners Hospital | Fayette | Lexington | | Pediatric | | | Shriners Hospitals for Children |
| Lexington VA Medical Center | Fayette | Lexington | 199 | General | | | Veterans Health Administration |
| Livingston Hospital and Health Services | Livingston | Salem | 25 | Level IV trauma center | 1954 | | |
| Logan Memorial Hospital | Logan | Russellville | 75 | General | | | LifePoint Health |
| Louisville Medical Center | Jefferson | Louisville | | General | | | |
| Lourdes Hospital | McCracken | Paducah | 286 | General | 1905 | | Bon Secours Mercy Health |
| Marcum and Wallace Memorial Hospital | Estill | Irvine | 25 | General | | | Bon Secours Mercy Health |
| Marshall County Hospital | Marshall | Benton | 25 | General | 1964 | | Western Kentucky Rural Healthcare Network |
| Mary Breckinridge Hospital | Leslie | Hyden | 25 | General | 1928 | | |
| McDowell ARH Hospital | Floyd | McDowell | 25 | General | | | Appalachian Regional Healthcare |
| Meadowview Regional Medical Center | Mason | Maysville | 100 | General | | | LifePoint Health |
| The Medical Center | Warren | Bowling Green | 309 | General | | | Commonwealth Health Corporation |
| The Medical Center | Simpson | Franklin | 25 | General | 1969 | | Commonwealth Health Corporation |
| The Medical Center | Allen | Scottsville | 24 | General | | | Commonwealth Health Corporation |
| Middlesboro ARH Hospital | Bell | Middlesboro | 96 | General | | | Appalachian Regional Healthcare |
| Monroe County Medical Center | Monroe | Tompkinsville | 49 | General | | | |
| Morgan County ARH Hospital | Morgan | West Liberty | 25 | General | | | Appalachian Regional Healthcare |
| Muhlenberg Community Hospital | Muhlenberg | Greenville | 85 | General | 1938 | | |
| Murray-Calloway County Hospital | Calloway | Murray | 378 | General | 1910 | | |
| New Horizons Medical Center | Owen | Owenton | 25 | General | 1951 | | |
| Nicholas County Hospital | Nicholas | Carlisle | 18 | General | 1926 | | Johnson Mathers Health Care |
| Norton Audubon Hospital | Jefferson | Louisville | 432 | General | | | Norton Healthcare |
| Norton Brownsboro Hospital | Jefferson | Louisville | 127 | General | | | Norton Healthcare |
| Norton Hospital | Jefferson | Louisville | 605 | General | | | Norton Healthcare |
| Norton Suburban Hospital | Jefferson | Louisville | 343 | General | | | Norton Healthcare |
| Ohio County Hospital | Ohio | Hartford | 25 | General | | | |
| Our Lady of Bellefonte Hospital | Greenup | Russell | 214 | General | 1953 | 2020 | Bon Secours Kentucky Health System |
| Owensboro Health Regional Hospital | Daviess | Owensboro | 477 | Level III Trauma center | | | |
| Paintsville ARH Hospital | Johnson | Paintsville | 72 | General | 1920 | | Appalachian Regional Healthcare |
| Pikeville Medical Center | Pike | Pikeville | 340 | Level II trauma center, teaching | 1924 | | |
| Pineville Community Hospital | Bell | Pineville | 136 | General | 1938 | | |
| River Valley Behavioral Health Hospital | Daviess | Owensboro | 80 | Psychiatric | 1966 | | |
| Roberts Chapel | Jessamine | Nicholasville | | Military | c. 1861 | c. 1865 | Camp Nelson |
| Robley Rex VA Medical Center | Jefferson | Louisville | 120 | General | 1952 | | Veterans Health Administration |
| Rockcastle Regional Hospital | Rockcastle | Mount Vernon | 119 | General | 1956 | | |
| Russell County Hospital | Russell | Russell Springs | 25 | General | 1981 | | Baptist Health |
| Saint Claire Medical Center | Rowan | Morehead | 127 | General | 1963 | | UK HealthCare |
| Saint Elizabeth Edgewood | Kenton | Edgewood | 459 | General | | | Saint Elizabeth Healthcare |
| Saint Elizabeth Florence | Boone | Florence | 166 | General | | | Saint Elizabeth Healthcare |
| Saint Elizabeth Fort Thomas | Campbell | Fort Thomas | 163 | General | | | Saint Elizabeth Healthcare |
| Saint Elizabeth Hebron | Boone | Hebron | | General | | | Saint Elizabeth Healthcare |
| Saint Joseph Berea | Madison | Berea | 25 | General | 1898 | | KentuckyOne Health |
| Saint Joseph East | Fayette | Lexington | 217 | General | 1877 | | KentuckyOne Health |
| Saint Joseph Hospital | Fayette | Lexington | 433 | General | 1877 | | KentuckyOne Health |
| Saint Joseph London | Laurel | London | 159 | General | | | KentuckyOne Health |
| Saint Joseph Mount Sterling | Montgomery | Mount Sterling | 42 | General | 1918 | | KentuckyOne Health |
| Select Specialty Hospital | Fayette | Lexington | 41 | Rehabilitation | | | |
| Southern Kentucky Rehabilitation Hospital | Warren | Bowling Green | 60 | General | | | |
| Spring View Hospital | Marion | Lebanon | 75 | General | 1944 | | LifePoint Health |
| T.J. Samson Community Hospital | Barren | Glasgow | 196 | General | 1928 | | |
| Taylor Regional Hospital | Taylor | Campbellsville | 90 | Level III trauma center | 1968 | | KentuckyOne Health |
| Ten Broeck Hospital | Jefferson | Louisville | 186 | General | 1976 | | |
| Three Rivers Medical Center | Lawrence | Louisa | 84 | General | | | Community Health |
| Trigg County Hospital | Trigg | Cadiz | 25 | General | 1952 | | Western Kentucky Rural Healthcare Network |
| TriStar Greenview Regional Hospital | Warren | Bowling Green | 211 | General | | | HCA Healthcare |
| Twin Lakes Regional Medical Center | Grayson | Leitchfield | 75 | General | 1951 | | |
| Golisano Children's Hospital at UK | Fayette | Lexington | | Level I pediatric trauma center | | | UK HealthCare |
| University of Louisville Hospital | Jefferson | Louisville | 346 | Level I trauma center | 1817 | | UofL Health |
| UofL Health - Frazier Rehabilitation Institute | Jefferson | Louisville | 135 | Rehabilitation | | | UofL Health |
| UofL Health - Jewish Hospital | Jefferson | Louisville | 462 | General | 1905 | | UofL Health |
| UofL Health - Mary and Elizabeth Hospital | Jefferson | Louisville | 298 | General | 1874 | | UofL Health |
| UofL Health - Medical Center South | Bullitt | Hillview | | General | | | UofL Health |
| UofL Health - Peace Hospital | Jefferson | Louisville | 220 | Psychiatric | | | UofL Health |
| UofL Health - Shelbyville Hospital | Shelby | Shelbyville | 70 | General | 1906 | | UofL Health |
| Wayne County Hospital | Wayne | Monticello | 25 | General | 1917 | | |
| Western State Hospital | Christian | Hopkinsville | 495 | Psychiatric | 1854 | | |
| Westlake Regional Hospital | Adair | Columbia | 74 | General | | | Norton Healthcare |
| Whitesburg ARH Hospital | Letcher | Whitesburg | 90 | General | 1956 | | Appalachian Regional Healthcare |
| Williamson ARH Hospital | Pike | South Williamson | 148 | General | | | Appalachian Regional Healthcare |
