= Bellefonte, Kentucky =

- City
- Location of Bellefonte in Greenup County, Kentucky.
- Coordinates: 38°29′37″N 82°41′18″W
- Country: United States
- State: Kentucky
- County: Greenup
- Incorporated: July 3, 1951

Government
  - Type: City Commission
  - Mayor: Ryan Reames

Area
  - Total: 0.88 sq mi (2.29 km^{2})
  - Land: 0.88 sq mi (2.28 km^{2})
  - Water: 0.0039 sq mi (0.01 km^{2})
- Elevation: 636 ft (194 m)

Population (2020)
  - Total: 920
  - Density: 1,044.7/sq mi (403.35/km^{2})
- Time zone: UTC-5 (Eastern (EST))
  - Summer (DST): UTC-4 (EDT)
- ZIP Code: 41101
- FIPS code: 21-05374
- GNIS feature ID: 0486804
- Website: cityofbellefonte.com

Bellefonte is a home rule-class city in Greenup County, Kentucky, United States. As of the 2020 census, Bellefonte had a population of 920. Bellefonte is a part of the Huntington-Ashland, WV-KY-OH Metropolitan Statistical Area (MSA). In 2013, according to new boundary definitions, the MSA had a population of 361,580.

Being primarily residential, Bellefonte is a suburb of nearby Ashland, to which it is closely connected. Known for having tree-lined streets and exclusively upscale neighborhoods, the city is home to the private Bellefonte Country Club, which has an 18-hole golf course, a swimming pool, tennis courts and a ballroom.

Bellefonte was first incorporated on July 3, 1951, beginning with only 275 residents, and developed in the latter half of the 20th century. The exclusive nature of the city is evident by its demographic makeup. Within the corporate limits, there are virtually no residents under the poverty line.

Nearby, Our Lady of Bellefonte Hospital was named for its location, being just north of Bellefonte in Russell. In 1979, Ashland Inc. relocated its headquarters offices from Winchester Avenue in downtown Ashland to Russell near the hospital complex just north of Bellefonte. This modern business park complex was suitable for any Fortune 100 company such as Ashland, Inc. It comprised four glass office buildings: an executive building, two general office buildings and a combination warehouse/office building that contained printing presses and other service-type functions such as landscaping, etc. In 1999, the corporation moved its headquarters to Covington, Kentucky. Ashland, Inc. retained the office services building. The other structures, after a brief period as office facilities, were ultimately sold to nearby Our Lady of Bellefonte Hospital, and were known as Bellefonte Centre and Bellefonte Pavilion, and are used for physicians' offices and clinics, hospital business offices, other hospital services and are rented to other businesses. Upon the closure of Our Lady of Bellefonte Hospital in 2020, the former Ashland Oil property was sold to UK King's Daughters in Ashland.

== Geography ==
Bellefonte is located in eastern Greenup County, and is bordered to the north by the city of Russell and to the southeast by the unincorporated community of Westwood in Boyd County.

According to the United States Census Bureau, the city has a total area of 0.89 square miles (2.3 km^{2}), of which 0.004 square miles (0.01 km^{2}), or 0.51%, is water. The city sits on a plateau northwest of Ashland, centered on Kentucky Route 5 and Country Club Drive. Route 5 terminates to the northeast at U.S. Route 23 near the Boyd/Greenup county line, and downtown Ashland is 3 miles (5 km) to the east.

The older section of what would become Bellefonte was laid out in town lots and sold, beginning in 1918, by the Means and Russell Iron Company. It was originally part of the several thousand-acre Wheatley farm. It was named after the iron furnace that was operated there from 1826 to 1893, named the Bellefonte Furnace. Some remnants of the old furnace remain today in Bellefonte, as its hand-cut limestone blocks are used as a retaining wall along Oxcart Road, near the Community Presbyterian Church, which is located on the original site of the iron furnace. The name "Bellefonte" is of French origin, a combination of the words "belle" for 'beautiful' and "fonte" which has the meaning of 'melting', or in this case 'foundry', 'forge' or 'smelting', referring to the iron furnace located there. A few of the original log-built dwellings from the 1800s iron furnace settlement remain along Route 5, but have been upgraded to upscale residential homes.

The city is located on a one-mile wide belt of relatively flat land that is approximately 100 feet higher in elevation than the nearby Ohio River valley. The unusual topography which is easily noticeable on topographical maps and aerial satellite imagery was created by the ancient Teays River. Larger than the Ohio River, the Teays cut a mile wide valley through the area before being filled with glacial silt during the ice age. This belt of flat land extends from Catlettsburg where it leaves the Ohio River north to near Wurtland and includes parts of Ashland, Westwood, Bellefonte, Russell and Flatwoods. The Ohio River came after the ice age in its current path which created another valley just northeast of Bellefonte. This entire belt of flat land was once known as The Flatwoods beginning in the mid-19th century. The name was retained when it was applied to the nearby city of Flatwoods, just northwest of Bellefonte.

== Demographics ==
Historical population
Census	Pop.	Note	%±
1960	337		—
1970	966		186.6%
1980	908		−6.0%
1990	838		−7.7%
2000	837		−0.1%
2010	888		6.1%
2020	920		3.6%
U.S. Decennial Census

As of the census of 2000, there were 837 people, 349 households, and 270 families residing in the city. The population density was 1,161.3 inhabitants per square mile (448.4/km^{2}). There were 383 housing units at an average density of 531.4 units per square mile (205.2 units/km^{2}). The racial makeup of the city was 98.57% White, 0.12% African American, 0.84% Asian, 0.12% from other races, and 0.36% from two or more races.

There were 349 households, out of which 26.4% had children under the age of 18 living with them, 69.3% were married couples living together, 6.3% had a female householder with no husband present, and 22.6% were non-families. 21.5% of all households were made up of individuals, and 12.9% had someone living alone who was 65 years of age or older. The average household size was 2.40 and the average family size was 2.77.

In the city the population was spread out, with 20.1% under the age of 18, 3.8% from 18 to 24, 21.1% from 25 to 44, 31.5% from 45 to 64, and 23.4% who were 65 years of age or older. The median age was 48 years. For every 100 females, there were 93.8 males. For every 100 females age 18 and over, there were 89.5 males.

The median income for a household in the city was $73,333, and the median income for a family was $81,798. Males had a median income of $56,964 versus $40,000 for females. The per capita income for the city was $37,813. None of the families and 1.8% of the population were living below the poverty line, including no under eighteens and 1.8% of those over 64.

== Education ==
Bellefonte is part of the Russell Independent School District, which also includes the adjacent cities of Russell and Flatwoods. There are, however, no public schools within the city of Bellefonte and the city's children either attend public schools in either Russell or Flatwoods or attend private schools in Ashland or in other locations. Prior to 1993, the district operated Bellefonte Elementary School in the city which served grades K-5. The school was closed as part of the district's elementary school consolidation plan in 1993 and the building was demolished.

== Public safety ==
- The city of Bellefonte does not operate its own fire department. Fire protection services within Bellefonte are contracted to the neighboring city of Russell. The closest fire station to Bellefonte is Russell Fire Station #2, located at 1401 Kenwood Drive, approximately one mile from the Bellefonte city limits near the former Our Lady of Bellefonte Hospital.
- The Bellefonte Police Department is located in the city's municipal building located at 705 Bellefonte-Princess Road.
- Bellefonte is a member of the East Greenup County Ambulance Tax District. The Greenup County Ambulance Authority serves Bellefonte under contract from the district from its station at 1104 Powell Lane in Flatwoods.
