= Picadome, Lexington =

Coordinates: 38°01′35″N 84°31′30″W

Picadome
- neighborhood
- Interactive map of Picadome

Area
  - Land: 0.814 sq mi (2.11 km^{2})

Population (2000)
  - Total: 2,053
  - Density: 2,520/sq mi (974/km^{2})

Picadome is a neighborhood in southwestern Lexington, Kentucky, United States. Its boundaries are Waller Avenue to the north, Harrodsburg Road to the west, a combination of Southland Drive and Rosemont Garden to the south, and the Norfolk Southern railroad tracks to the east.

Saint Joseph Hospital and Lafayette High School are located in the neighborhood.

As of 2009, the median income of Picadome per capita was US$46,610.
