= Mercy Health St. Joseph Warren Hospital =

Non-profit hospital in Ohio, USA

Mercy Health St Joseph Warren
- Mercy Health

Geography
- Location: Warren, Ohio, United States
- Coordinates: 41°14′16″N 80°49′06″W

Organization
- Religious affiliation: Catholic
- Network: Mercy Health

Services
- Emergency department: Yes
- Beds: 137

Helipads
- Helipad: Yes

History
- Former name: St. Joseph Riverside Hospital
- Opened: 1924

Links
- Website: mercy.com/Hospital
- Lists: Hospitals in Ohio

Mercy Health — St. Joseph Warren Hospital is a 137-bed non-profit hospital in Warren, Ohio. It is owned and operated by Mercy Health.

== History ==
Mercy Health — St. Joseph Warren Hospital was founded in 1924 when Dr. Chester Waller entrusted Riverside Hospital to the Sisters of the Humility of Mary. Initially named St. Joseph Riverside Hospital, it was located on Tod Avenue NW. The hospital was renamed and relocated to Eastland Avenue SE, where it continues to serve the community. In 2024, the hospital celebrated its 100th anniversary.

== Facilities ==
Mercy Health — St. Joseph Warren Hospital offers a range of primary care and extensive diagnostic and therapeutic outpatient services. It features the area's most innovative emergency department and comprehensive cancer center. The hospital is home to Trumbull County's most advanced surgical suites with the latest technology and built to today's design standards. Additionally, the hospital has an innovative Healing Garden.

The hospital employs more than 900 people in medical, professional and service roles.

=== Healthcare Services ===
Mercy Health — St. Joseph Warren Hospital provides a wide range of medical and surgical services, including cancer care, diabetes management, cardiology, maternity care, surgical weight loss solutions, robotic surgery, trauma and wound care, and rehabilitation. The hospital is the first verified Level III trauma center in Trumbull County. and part of the only regional trauma network which includes a Level I Trauma Center at St. Elizabeth in Youngstown.

=== Mercy Health ===
The hospital is one of three in the Mahoning Valley operated by Mercy Health. The other two are Mercy Health — St. Elizabeth Youngstown Hospital near downtown and Mercy Health — St. Elizabeth Boardman Hospital on Market Street in Boardman. There also are dozens of satellite locations, free-standing clinics and doctor’s offices under the Mercy Health-Youngstown umbrella.
