= Mercy Health — Queen City Medical Center Emergency Department =

- Mercy Health (Ohio and Kentucky)
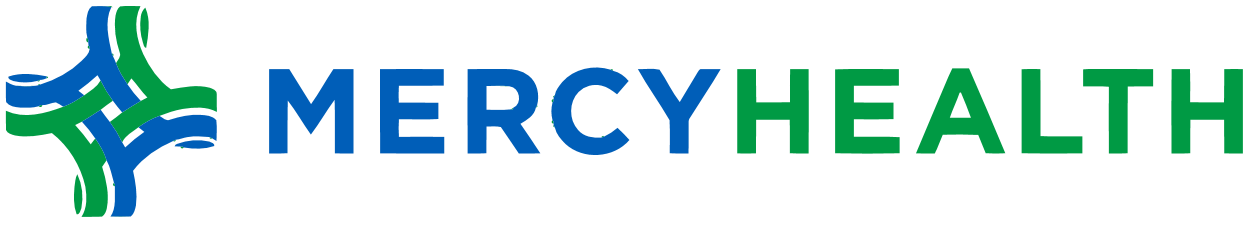

Geography
- Location: 3131 Queen City Ave. Cincinnati, Ohio 45238, Ohio, United States
- Coordinates: 39°08′06″N 84°36′27″W

Organization
- Type: Freestanding Emergency Department
- Religious affiliation: Catholic
- Network: Bon Secours Mercy Health

Services
- Emergency department: Yes

Helipads
- Helipad: Yes

History
- Opened: 2016

Links
- Website: www.mercy.com/locations/emergency-room/cincinnati/mercy-health-queen-city-medical-center-emergency-department
- Lists: Hospitals in Ohio

Located in Cincinnati, Ohio, Mercy Health — Queen City Medical Center Emergency Department provides 24-hour emergency medical care in the Western Hills neighborhood.

== Facilities ==
Mercy Health — Queen City Medical Center Emergency Department opened in 2016, seeing 20,000 patients a year. The building offers an ambulance bay for EMS access along with on-site imaging as well as OB-GYN, cardiac and orthopedic specialists.

The building is also home to a physical therapy center, outpatient imaging and an anticoagulation clinic.

The freestanding emergency department is associated with Mercy Health — West Hospital and managed by Mercy Health.
