= Headley Green, Lexington =

Headley Green
- Neighborhood of Lexington, Kentucky
- Interactive map of Headley Green
- Coordinates: 38.035°N 84.532°W
- Country: United States
- State: Kentucky
- County: Fayette
- City: Lexington

Area
  - Total: 0.069 sq mi (0.18 km^{2})
  - Water: 0 sq mi (0.0 km^{2})

Population (2000)
  - Total: 285
  - Density: 4,143/sq mi (1,600/km^{2})
- Time zone: UTC-5 (Eastern (EST))
  - Summer (DST): UTC-4 (EDT)
- ZIP code: 40504
- Area code: 859

Headley Green is a neighborhood in southwestern Lexington, Kentucky, United States. It was built in the early 1990s from land that had previously been an 18-hole par 3 golf course, a putt-putt course and a driving range for public use. It was also lighted so many people like to play at night . Its boundaries are Mason Headley Road to the north, Cold Harbor Drive to the west, Laurel Hill Road to the south, and the St. Joseph Medical Office Complex to the east.

== Neighborhood statistics ==
- Area: 44 acres / .068 sq. miles
- Houses: 185
- Population density: 4,143 people per square mile
- Median household income: $31,647
