= List of employers in Lexington, Kentucky =

According to the Greater Lexington Chamber of Commerce, the largest employers in Lexington-Fayette County, Kentucky are:

#	Employer	# of employees	Description
1	University of Kentucky	12,430	Public university, one of the state's top employers
2	Fayette County Public Schools	5,427	K-12 school district
3	CHI Saint Joseph Health	3,000	Healthcare
4	Xerox	3,000	A Fortune 500 developer, manufacturer, and supplier of printing and imaging solutions
5	Lexington-Fayette Urban County	2,821	Local government
6	Lexmark	2,154	A Fortune 500 developer, manufacturer, and supplier of printing and imaging solutions
7	Walmart	2,027	Retailer
8	Baptist Health	1,924	Hospital operator
9	Lexington VA Medical Center	1,565	Hospital operator
10	Lockheed Martin	1,470	Government contractor
11	Amazon.com	1,200	A large electronic commerce corporation with a large distribution center on Leestown Road
12	UPS	1,200	Transportation
13	Cardinal Hill Rehabilitation Hospital	1,000	Healthcare
14	Link-Belt Construction Equipment	750	Manufacturing
15	Webasto Roof Systems	720	Manufacturing
16	Valvoline	694	Transportation
17	Meijer	675	Retailer
18	Kroger	673	Retailer
19	Galls	640	A mail-order company catering to law enforcement and other public safety agencies
20	Federal Medical Center	560	Prison
21	IBM Global Services	552	
22	Big Ass Fans	550	Manufacturing
23	Central Bancshares	540	Finance
24	Schneider Electric	500	Manufacturing

Other large employers in Lexington include:

- Ceradyne
- GE Lighting
- Georgia-Pacific (Dixie Cups)
- Jif
- Tempur Sealy International

== See also ==
- Old Kentucky Chocolates, chocolate retail store founded by Don Hurt
