= Honaker (surname) =

Honaker is a surname. Notable people with the surname include:

- Charlie Honaker (1899–1974), American football player
- Lombe Honaker (1888–1964), American college football and basketball player
- Sam Honaker (1887–1966), American football player
- Michael Honaker (born 1965), West Virginia politician
