= Mercy Health St. Vincent Medical Center =

Geography
- Location: Toledo, Ohio, United States
- Coordinates: 41°40′06″N 83°32′34″W

Organization
- Affiliated university: University of Toledo Medical Center
- Network: Mercy Health

Services
- Emergency department: Level I Trauma Center

History
- Founded: 1855

Links
- Website: https://www.mercy.com/locations/hospitals/toledo/mercy-health-st-vincent-medical-center
- Lists: Hospitals in Ohio
- Other links: Hospitals in Ohio

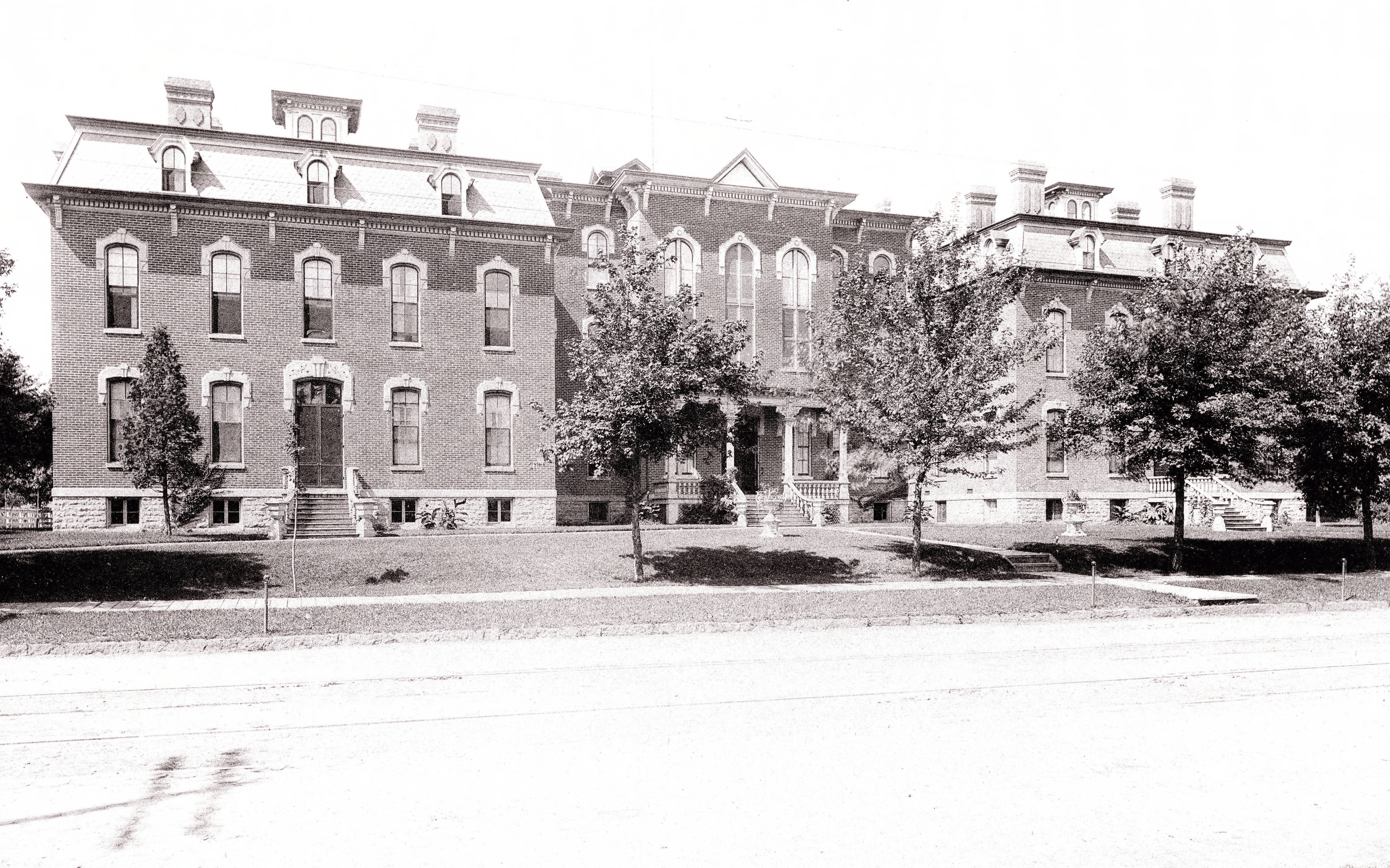
St. Vincent Hospital seen in 1895

Mercy Health— St. Vincent Medical Center (MSVMC), was the first hospital in Toledo, Ohio and is part of Mercy Health.

Established in 1855, St. Vincent is part of Mercy Health, which includes seven hospitals serving Northwest Ohio and Southeast Michigan. It is a critical-care regional referral and teaching center, with focus on high-risk mothers and infants, substance abuse, and chronic care, along with being a Level I Trauma Center for children & adults, and is an accredited Chest Pain Center. They also offer spiritual care for admitted patients.

In collaboration with The University of Toledo Medical Center and St. Rita's Medical Center, the hospital operates both helicopter air-ambulances and ground-based critical care ambulances.
