= John Russell (developer) =

Irish-American industrialist & land developer

John Russell (25 December 1821 – 24 December 1896) was an Irish-American industrialist active in the development of Ashland, Kentucky, and the founder of Russell, Kentucky, which was named in his honor.

== History ==
John Russell was born near Derry, Ireland, and immigrated to the United States with his family in 1830. His father, also named John Russell, was a farmer and settled in Tyler County, Virginia (now West Virginia). At 16, Russell left for Wheeling, where he clerked at a hardware store for five years.

In 1850, he moved to Kentucky to serve as a bookkeeper for the Amanda Furnace in Greenup County for $400 a year. After two years, he was given a quarter interest in the concern and his salary increased to $1000 a year. Upon the 1855 death of the senior partner, Archibald Paull of Wheeling, he bought an eighth interest in the Belle Fonta Furnace and formed a partnership with its owners, Thomas and Hugh Means. As president of the Means and Russell Iron Company, he purchased the land of the former Amanda Furnace and, in 1869, platted out a new city named "Riverview" along the expected route of a new Chesapeake and Ohio Railroad spur between Huntington, West Virginia, and Cincinnati, Ohio.

This town was renamed "Russell" in his honor in 1873. He subsequently served as president of the Catlettsburg National Bank, the Means & Russell Iron Co. in Russell, the St. Clair Coke Works (in Fayette County, West Virginia), and the Norton Iron Works in Ashland.

John Russell married Anna Mead in 1856 and sired five children: Mollie, Helen Virginia, John III, Emma Clancy, and Charles.
