= Rockcastle Regional Hospital and Respiratory Care Center =

- Part of Rockcastle Regional's campus

Geography
- Location: Mount Vernon, Kentucky, United States
- Coordinates: 37°21′29.6″N 84°20′11.1″W

Organization
- Type: Regional
- Affiliated university: University of Kentucky Medical Center

Services
- Beds: 23, 93 (ventilator)

History
- Opened: 1956

Links
- Website: rockcastleregional.org
- Lists: Hospitals in Kentucky

Rockcastle Regional Hospital and Respiratory Care Center is a not-for-profit acute and long-term care hospital located in Mt. Vernon, Kentucky. The facility primarily serves Rockcastle and surrounding counties with its 26-bed acute care facility, but receives referrals for its 143-bed ventilator facility nationwide It is an eleven-time winner of the Kentucky Hospital Association Quality Award and is accredited by the Joint Commission.

== Services ==
In addition to its Long-term care ventilator specialty, Rockcastle Regional offers chemotherapy, an imaging department with a 128-Slice CT Scan, and a surgery suite. Rockcastle implemented an Electronic Medical Records system to improve patient safety, quality of care, and efficiency. Other services include:

- Occupational Therapy
- Speech Therapy
- Emergency Department
- Physical Therapy
- Retail Pharmacy
- Mammography
- Infusion Services
- Home health care
- Pulmonary Rehabilitation
- QuickCare Clinic
- Dentistry
- Dialysis
- Laboratory
- Pediatric Services
- Rural Health Clinics

== University of Kentucky Partnership ==
Rockcastle recently partnered with the University of Kentucky Medical Center to host advanced medical specialties. These patients would otherwise have to travel to Lexington. Specialties include:

- Oncology
- Pulmonology
- Cardiology
- Pediatric Services

== Long Term Ventilator Care ==
Rockcastle Regional has specialized in ventilator care since 1980, opening the facility with 32 beds. The hospital takes a holistic approach to respiratory care; the hospital provides daily activities, an on-site chaplain, frequent pet visits, a residents' board and a healing garden. Treatment plans combine Respiratory Therapy with Occupational, Physical and Speech therapy to improve the patients' overall quality of life. Residents are given opportunities for trips outside the hospital grounds to visit family members or local attractions.

In 1980, Rockcastle Regional opened its first long-term care unit with 32 beds and added 28 more beds just 12 years later. Today, after numerous expansions, our Respiratory Care Center offers comfortable, professional, long-term care for 143 ventilator-dependent residents. They are the largest, free-standing ventilator dependent facility in the nation with an average wean rate of over 50%.

The staff has extensive knowledge and experience in many conditions that lead to ventilator dependence. Ranging from spinal cord injuries to genetic birth defects, as well as, Chronic Obstructive Pulmonary Disease (COPD) and neurological diagnoses such as ALS and Muscular Dystrophy, our staff are fully trained and equipped to provide the highest level of ventilator-dependent care to residents of a wide range of diagnoses.

There are many factors involved in the weaning process that determine if a resident is able to wean from the ventilator. Some residents wean quickly; others take longer; and some are not able to wean due to injuries or progressive diseases. When residents are admitted to the Respiratory Care Center, the physician team and the respiratory therapist, along with a multi-disciplinary care team, evaluate each residents' health status, health goals, weaning goals, and personal goals and develop a plan to help each resident achieve those highly personalized goals.

== Rating Information ==
Rating information for Rockcastle Regional is available from the Healthgrades website. Ten patient safety indicators were available through Healthgrades. Rockcastle received nine average ratings and one worse than average rating. No better than average ratings were received. Patient outcomes for inpatients were recorded for heart failure, chronic obstructive pulmonary disease (COPD) and pneumonia. The hospital received as expected outcomes for the first two categories and a worse than expected outcome for pneumonia for inpatients. Information from patient surveys showed those patients filling out surveys gave Rockcastle ratings either the same as the national average or better for most questions. Two ratings were better than the national average:

- Patients at Rockcastle who gave this hospital a nine or ten were 76% versus 69% for patient ratings of a nine or ten on all other hospitals nationally.
- Rockcastle patients would said they would definitely recommend this hospital were 76% of respondents versus such a rating nationally amongst patients of 70%.
