= Ephraim McDowell Regional Medical Center =

- Shown in Danville, Kentucky

Geography
- Location: 217 S. Third Street Danville, Kentucky, United States
- Coordinates: 37.6440°N 84.7734°W

Organization
- Care system: Public
- Type: General
- Affiliated university: None

Services
- Emergency department: Level III Trauma center
- Beds: 222

History
- Founded: 1887

Links
- Website: http://www.emrmc.org
- Lists: Hospitals in Kentucky

Ephraim McDowell Regional Medical Center (EMRMC) is a locally controlled not-for-profit 222-bed hospital located in Danville, Kentucky.

== History ==
EMRMC took its name from Ephraim McDowell, a ground-breaking local physician who performed the first ovariotomy in the United States in 1809.

Following Dr. McDowell's successful surgery, Danville became home to a number of physicians. This led to the formation of a community hospital in 1887. Through the years, the hospital expanded often. It marked its centennial in 1987 by changing its name to Ephraim McDowell Regional Medical Center.

== Today ==
EMRMC's primary service area includes Boyle County, Kentucky and five contiguous counties -- Casey, Garrard, Lincoln, Mercer, and Washington—with a total population of more than 140,000 residents.

In January 2023 EMRMC started the first and only 24/7 ED ECMO/ECPR program in the state of Kentucky. Working with regional EMS agencies to activate and mobilize resources to rapidly initiate ECMO for patients in cardiac arrest. In January 2026 EMRMC's ECMO program was awarded the Extracorporeal Life Support Organization's (ELSO) Silver Pathway to Excellence Award, the highest level award available to an ECMO program in its first three years of operation.

EMRMC began performing catheter based embolectomy of pulmonary embolisms (PE) in December 2022. Shortly after this they performed their first embolectomy of a patient with a PE on ECMO. Over the next year they created a protocoled multi-disciplinary team response that became the EMRMC Pulmonary Embolism Response Team (PERT). In May 2026 the EMRMC PERT was selected into the inaugural group of 21 PERT's worldwide as part of the PERT Consortium PRISM initiative to create the next generation of PE management guidelines.

According to its IRS Form 990, in Fiscal Year 2007 EMRMC had assets of $110,438,710, income of $105,401,634, and revenue of $105,286,175.

Thomson Reuters named EMRMC among its top 100 Performance Improvement Leaders. About 3,000 hospitals across the country were evaluated on analysis of data provided from public sources such as Medicaid and Medicare from a five-year period between 2001 and 2005.

== Services ==
Available services include:

- 24/7 ECMO/ECPR
- World-Class Comprehensive Pulmonary Embolism Management
- Protocoled Massive Hemorrhage Management
- Behavioral Health Services
- Cancer Care Center
- Cancer Care-Central Kentucky Cancer Program (CKCP)
- Cardiac Care Services
- Critical Care
- Diabetes and Endocrinology Center
- Diagnostic Services
- Emergency Care
- Kids Can Do Pediatric Therapy Center
- Laboratory Services
- Medical/Surgical Services
- Nearly 100 Physicians Offering 29 Specialties
- Orthopedic Care
- Pastoral Care
- Pain Management Center
- Rehabilitation Services
- Respiratory Therapy
- Skilled Nursing Care Unit
- Sleep Disorders Center
- Surgical Services
- Vascular Services
- Volunteer Opportunities/Auxiliary
- Women's Health Services
- Wound Healing Center

== Accreditations ==
The following aspects of EMRMC have been accredited or awarded by recognized authorities:

- ELSO Silver Award - Pathway to Excellence
- Inaugural PERT Consortium PRISM Hospitals
- EMRMC -- Joint Commission on Accreditation of Healthcare Organizations (JCAHO).
- Cardiovascular Laboratory -- Intersocietal Commission for the Accreditation of Vascular Laboratories (ICAVL).
- Clinical Laboratory Services -- College of American Pathologists.
- Diabetes Management -- American Diabetes Association.
- Extracranial Cerebrovascular Testing—Intersocietal Commission for the Accreditation of Vascular Laboratories.
- Mobile Mammography Unit -- American College of Radiology and U.S. Food and Drug Administration under the Mammography Quality Standards Act.
- Pain Management Center—American Academy of Pain Management.
- Peripheral Arterial Testing—Intersocietal Commission for the Accreditation of Vascular Laboratories.
- Peripheral Venous Testing—Intersocietal Commission for the Accreditation of Vascular Laboratories.
- Sleep Disorders Center -- American Academy of Sleep Medicine.

== Partner organizations ==
Either directly or through its parent organization, Ephraim McDowell Health, EMRMC is related to the following:

- Air Evac Lifeteam, an air-medical service operates from Stuart Powell Field in Danville.
- Central Kentucky Surgery Center provides outpatient surgery.
- Family Medical Centers comprise six health care facilities in Boyle and five other counties that offer family medical care and diagnostic services.
- Fort Logan Hospital is a 25-bed critical access hospital located in Stanford, Kentucky.
- McDowell Place is an independent and assisted living community in Danville.
- McDowell Wellness Center provides machines and swimming facilities to enhance fitness.
- MedSource provides home medical equipment and medical supplies for home use.
- Spine Center of Central Kentucky provides care and treatment of spine diseases and disorders.
