= Mercy Health Allen Hospital =

Mercy Health Kings Allen Hospital
- Mercy Health

Geography
- Location: Oberlin, Ohio, United States
- Coordinates: 41°17′43″N 82°13′38″W

Organization
- Religious affiliation: Catholic
- Network: Mercy Health

Services
- Emergency department: Yes
- Beds: 25

Helipads
- Helipad: No

History
- Opened: 1925

Links
- Website: www.mercy.com/locations/hospitals/lorain/mercy-allen-hospital
- Lists: Hospitals in Ohio

Mercy Health — Allen Hospital is a 25-bed non-profit hospital in Oberlin, Ohio owned and operated by Mercy Health. It serves the local area and provides services emergency and after-hours care to the Oberlin College community.

== History ==
Allen Memorial Hospital opened in 1925 with 25 beds. It was named for Oberlin College alumnus Dr. Dudley P. Allen, a leading Cleveland area surgeon. In 1954, Oberlin College, transferred ownership of the hospital to the City of Oberlin. The city passed ownership to the Sisters of Mercy in 1960.

== Facilities ==
Mercy Health — Allen Hospital is a small rural community and Critical Access hospital. It provides internal medicine, cardiology, neurology, pulmonology and urology services and includes an emergency department.

In 2018, construction on a new wing was started to house Primary Care and Walk-in Care offices. The new facilities offer Oberlin College students access to health care outside of Student Health Services’ open hours.
