= University of Kentucky Salvation Army Clinic =

Free clinic in Kentucky, United States

Coordinates: 38.0529°N 84.5053°W

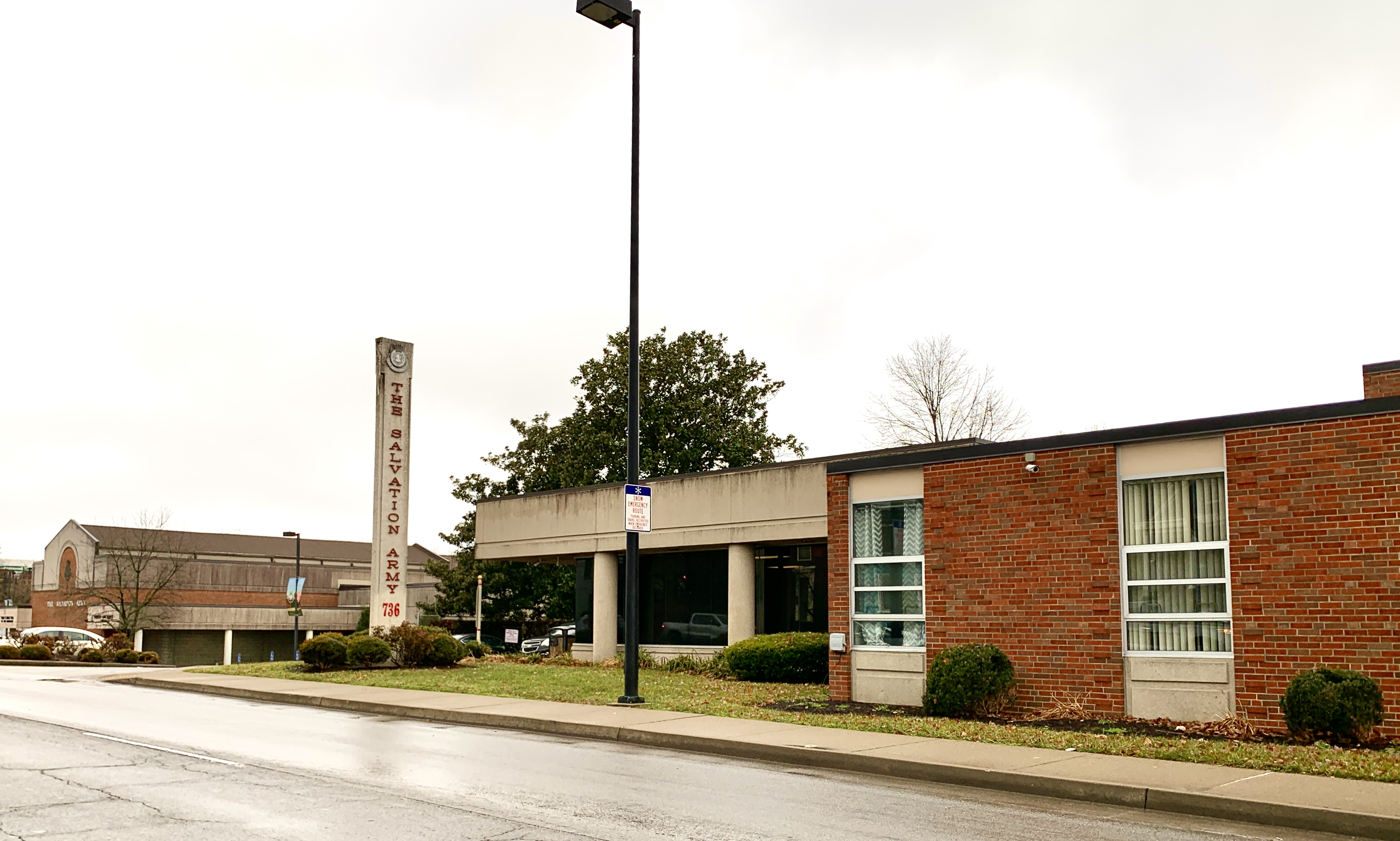
Clinic location

The University of Kentucky Salvation Army Clinic is a free clinic run by medical students in Lexington, Kentucky. Founded in 1986, it is the oldest community service project run through the UK College of Medicine and one of the oldest continuously operational student-run free clinics in the United States.

The clinic sees only uninsured adult patients two nights a week, usually without appointments. It is staffed by an administrative leader called the Floor Manager and 3 medical students that act as interviewers. UK and community physicians volunteer their time to make the clinic function. It has a small on-site pharmacy and can provide referrals to other health care services in the Lexington community.

== History ==
The clinic was founded in 1986 by Dr. Abner Golden and Dr. David Cowen as a partnership between the UK College of Medicine and the Salvation Army of Central Kentucky. It began in a temporarily walled-off corner of the dining room at the downtown Salvation Army, and soon moved to a converted storage closet. In 1992 Dr. John Gurley took over. Under his tenure, medical students in the pre-clinical years became involved, and the clinic moved to a larger space with three exam rooms and modest office space. Dr. Wanda Gonsalves assumed directorship in 1997, formalized the officer for second-year medical students, and added an elective focused on the clinic. Physical therapy students joined in 2002. Beginning in 2003, the llclinic directorship passed among several people until ultimately resting in the hands of Dr. Jennifer Joyce in 2006. A board of directors was established in 2010 to ensure greater administrative continuity.
