= Mercy Health Lorain Hospital =

Non-profit hospital in Ohio, USA

- Mercy Health

Geography
- Location: Lorain, Ohio, United States
- Coordinates: 41°26′09″N 82°14′23″W

Organization
- Religious affiliation: Catholic
- Network: Mercy Health

Services
- Emergency department: Yes
- Beds: 199

Helipads
- Helipad: No

History
- Former names: Lorain Community Hospital Lorain Community Regional Medical Center Mercy Regional Medical Center
- Constructed: 1982
- Opened: 1964

Links
- Website: mercy.com/Hospital
- Lists: Hospitals in Ohio

Mercy Health — Lorain Hospital is a 199-bed non-profit hospital in Lorain, Ohio. It is owned and operated by Mercy Health.

== History ==
Mercy Health — Lorain Hospital was created after St. Joseph's and Lorain Community Hospital merged. St. Joseph's Hospital was founded by Franciscans in 1892. The Sisters of the Holy Humility of Mary began managing the hospital in 1910 and took over ownership in 1927. In 1996 they took possession of Loraine Community Hospital--built in 1964--and merged the two. St Joseph's was closed in 1997 and turned into a community center. After a series of expansion and updates, the hospital was named Mercy Health Lorain Hospital in 2014.

== Facilities ==
Mercy Health — Lorain Hospital is a Short Term Acute Care hospital. Services include an emergency department, a complete surgery suite, cardiology, oncology, pulmonary, orthopedics, urology, psychiatry, neurology and internal medicine.

In 2024, the hospital chose not to renew its Level III trauma center designation but retained an emergency department.
