= Amanda Noelle =

Amanda Wilcox Patterson
- Born: Amanda Noelle Wilcox; December 28, 1983 (age 42)
- Origin: Russell, Kentucky
- Genres: Worship, Christian R&B, CCM, Christian EDM
- Occupations: Singer, songwriter, worship leader
- Instruments: vocals, singer-songwriter
- Years active: 2000–present
- Label: Save the City

Amanda Wilcox Patterson (born December 28, 1983), who went by the stage name Amanda Noelle, is an American Christian musician and worship leader from Russell, Kentucky, who plays a Christian pop style of contemporary worship music. She was part of the group Kimber Rising with her sister before she went solo, releasing Beautiful Name in 2013.

== Early and personal life ==
She was born Amanda Noelle Wilcox on December 28, 1983, and she was raised in Russell, Kentucky by parents Jim and Lisa Wilcox, who are still worship leaders at their church, First Baptist Church Russell. She was diagnosed with cancer in 2014.

== Music career ==
She started her music recording career in 2000, when she was in the group Kimber Rising with her sister and one more member, releasing an extended play. Her subsequent release, a solo extended play titled Beautiful Name, was released on August 20, 2013, with Save the City Records.

== Discography ==
EPs

- Beautiful Name (August 20, 2013)
