= Mercy Health Urbana Hospital =

Non-profit hospital in Ohio, USA

Mercy Health Kings Urbana Hospital
- Mercy Health

Geography
- Location: Urbana, Springfield, Ohio, United States
- Coordinates: 40°03′54″N 83°26′15″W

Organization
- Religious affiliation: Catholic
- Network: Mercy Health

Services
- Emergency department: Yes
- Beds: 25

Helipads
- Helipad: Yes, 99OH

History
- Former name: Mercy Memorial Hospital
- Opened: 1951

Links
- Website: mercy.com
- Lists: Hospitals in Ohio

Mercy Health — Urbana Hospital, formerly Mercy Memorial Hospital, is a 25-bed critical access, non-profit hospital in Urbana, Ohio owned and operated by the non-profit Mercy Health.

== History ==
Opened on Sept. 12, 1951, Mercy Health — Urbana Hospital was founded by the Sisters of Mercy. At the time, it was the first hospital to operate in Urbana.

The idea for the hospital emerged from a meeting the Urbana Country Club on Nov. 29, 1944 in a meeting of local business and civic leaders. The hospital opened officially in 1951 with 50 beds.

== Facilities ==
The hospital includes an emergency department (ED) with 13 emergency beds. It provides cardiology, pulmonology, internal medicine and urology, and oncology services.
