= Paintsville ARH Hospital =

- Appalachian Regional Healthcare, Inc.

Geography
- Location: 625 James S. Trimble Boulevard, Paintsville 41240, Kentucky, United States
- Coordinates: 37.815927°N 82.812939°W

Organization
- Type: General
- Affiliated university: none

Services
- Beds: 72

History
- Founded: November 6, 1920

Links
- Website: www.arh.org/paintsville-arh-hospital/
- Lists: Hospitals in Kentucky

Paintsville ARH Hospital is a 72-bed medical facility in Paintsville, Kentucky, US. The hospital serves nearly 45,000 people from five counties.

== History ==
Paintsville ARH Hospital is the modern heir to a medical legacy which began in Paintsville, Kentucky, in 1920. The current 72 bed primary care facility serving families in five counties was opened in 1983, and expanded in 1994, and was sold to Appalachian Regional Healthcare, Inc. and became Painstville ARH Hospital on December 1, 2021. Paintsville ARH Hospital has not only remained in the top ranking of the Joint Commission on Accreditation of Healthcare Organizations, but has been the recipient of Accreditation with Commendation on three occasions, providing family medicine, general surgery and other medical services to more than 45,000 people. Read more here: https://www.arh.org/newsfeed/appalachian-regional-healthcare-finalizes-purchase-of-paul-b.-hall-regional-medical-center

Paul B. Hall Regional Medical Center originally opened on November 6, 1920, and was known as Paintsville Medical Center. In 1979, the aging forty-room hospital began having difficulties meeting the State Fire Marshal's standards. Regulatory agencies required the hospital to close the current location and to construct a new building under the Hospital Management Associates (HMA).

On July 15, 1981, HMA received the Certification of Need that permitted the construction of a new facility. In February 1982, Paintsville sold HMA a portion of the Urban Renewal Project between Third Street and James S. Trimble Boulevard. The new hospital opened as Paul B. Hall Regional Medical Center in September 1982, and was named for Paintsville Medical Center's Chief of Staff between 1934 and 1981.

In 2014, National Nurses United found that Paul B. Hall Regional Medical Center was the most expensive hospital in Kentucky and the second most expensive in the United States. On average, the charged to cost ratio was determined to be 1,186%. Mass layoffs and downsizing occurred to rectify this issue.

== Services ==
Services at Paintsville ARH Hospital include:

- Emergency Services
- Surgery
- Neurology
- Obstetrics
- Gynecology
- Internal Medicine
- Ophthalmology
- Cardiology
- Radiology
- Urology
- Pulmonology
- Gastroenterology
- Oncology

The hospital also has both in-patient and out-patient services and has been accredited by the Joint Commission on Accreditation of Healthcare Organizations on three separate occasions in recent years
