= Mercy Health Marcum and Wallace Hospital =

Geography
- Location: Irvine, Kentucky, United States
- Coordinates: 37.7061°N 83.9798°W

Organization
- Religious affiliation: Catholic
- Network: Mercy Health

Services
- Emergency department: yes, Level IV Trama
- Beds: 25

Helipads
- Helipad: yes, US-7439

History
- Opened: 1959

Links
- Website: https://www.mercy.com/locations/hospitals/irvine/marcum-and-wallace-memorial-hospital
- Lists: Hospitals in Kentucky

Mercy Health — Marcum and Wallace Hospital is a 25-bed, not-for-profit, Critical Access Hospital located in Irvine, Kentucky. It serves as the only hospital in a four-county service area. The hospital is owned and operated by Mercy Health.

== History ==
Mercy Health — Marcum and Wallace Hospital was established in 1959. The hospital was initially funded by the Estill County community, which raised $25,000 to purchase the land and construct the facility. The Benedictine Sisters of Covington, Kentucky were chosen as administrators. This spurred legal actions, regarding separation of church and state. The matter was settled in 1962 by the United States Supreme Court and the Sisters managed it until 1986 when they handed it over to Mercy Health.

== Facilities ==
Mercy Health — Marcum and Wallace Hospital services, include acute care, emergency care, rehabilitation therapies, imaging, lab services, respiratory therapy, sleep studies and primary care through three Rural Health Clinics. The hospital is also a Level IV Trauma Center and an Accredited Chest Pain Center.
