= University of Kentucky College of Medicine =

Public medical school in Lexington, Kentucky, US

- Type: Public
- Established: 1960
- Dean: Chipper Griffith, MD, MSPH
- Students: 804 medical students 300+ graduate students 800+ residents
- Location: Lexington, Kentucky, United States; 38.0334°N 84.5104°W
- Campus: Multiple campuses (Bowling Green, Lexington, Northern Kentucky, Morehead)
- Website: http://medicine.uky.edu/

The University of Kentucky College of Medicine is a medical school based in Lexington, Kentucky, United States, at the University of Kentucky's Chandler Medical Center.

The college operates four campuses; in addition to the main hub in Lexington, there are two full campuses serving the Bowling Green and Northern Kentucky regions, and an Eastern Kentucky rural medicine training site in Morehead. Together, the four campuses aim to address physician shortages and urgent health care needs throughout Kentucky.

== History ==
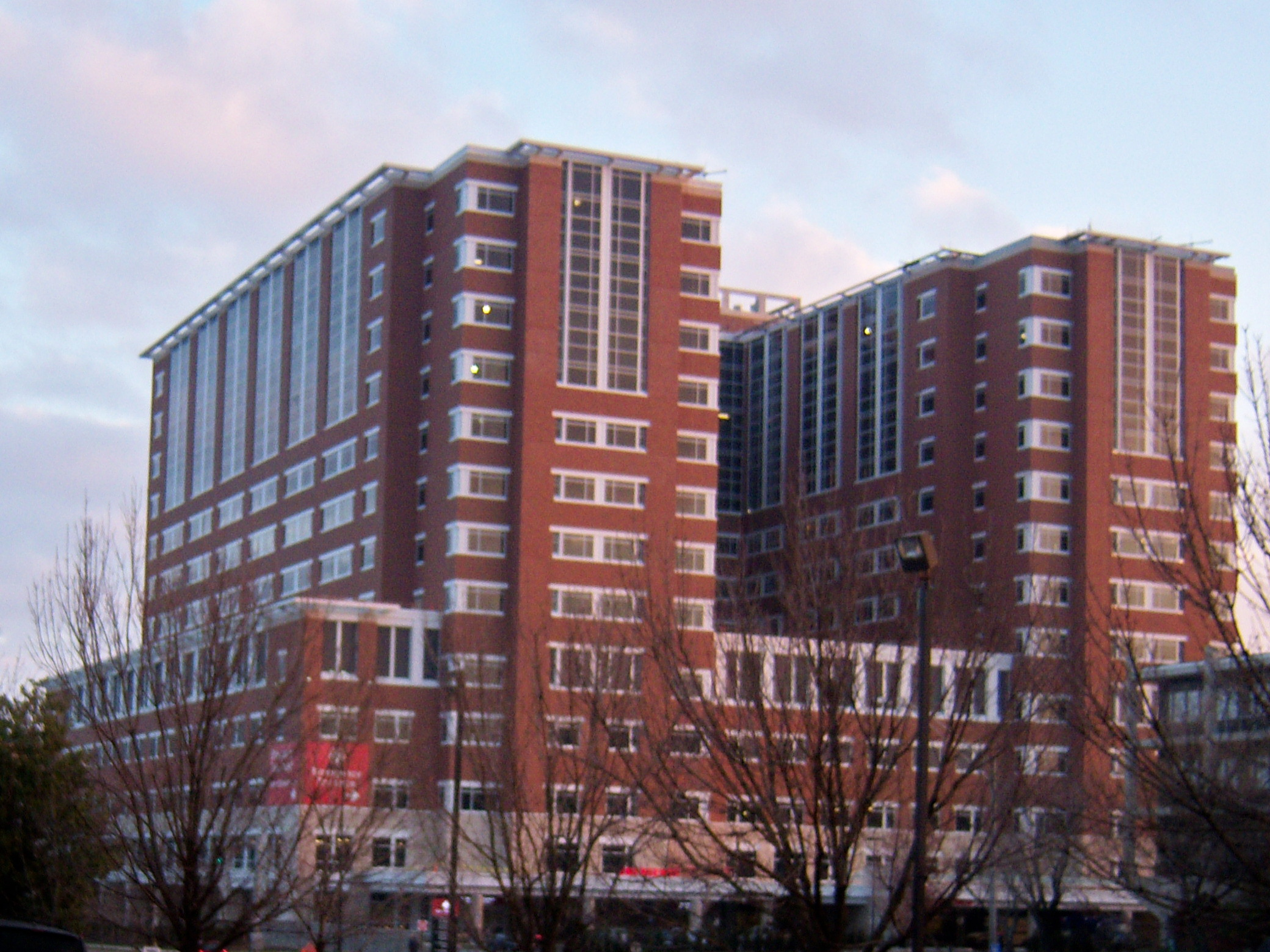
South Facade of Pavilion A, Albert B. Chandler Hospital

The Kentucky General Assembly approved the construction of the University of Kentucky Medical Center and accompanying medical school in 1956. William R. Willard directed the planning and development of the University of Kentucky Medical Center and subsequently was appointed vice president of the Medical Center and dean of the College of Medicine. The Medical Sciences Building was completed in 1960, and four years later the College of Medicine graduated its first class of 32 students. Since then, more than 10,000 medical students have earned M.D. degrees from the institution. The current dean is Chipper Griffith, M.D., MSPH, overseeing 2,278 full-time faculty and staff members, 804 medical students, more than 300 graduate students, and more than 800 residents as of 2017.

== Curriculum ==
The school offers a four-year M.D. program including two years of basic science instruction and two years of clinical rotations. In addition, the college supports combined degree programs that allow students to earn Master of Business Administration (MBA), Master of Public Health (MPH), or Doctor of Philosophy (Ph.D.) degrees while pursuing the M.D. The school's curriculum is managed centrally by the Office of Medical Education.

Classes are arranged around a loose block schedule, beginning and ending intermittently throughout the academic year. In the first two years, classes often adjourn by noon, leaving students free to pursue independent study or extra-curricular activities. Since the early 1990s, the college has been part of a model program to integrate early clinical experiences in among the traditional science classes of the first two years.

Students are active in the community, running the UKSA clinic affiliated with the Salvation Army, organizing an annual Community Health Fair, undertaking rural medicine externships in surrounding counties, and volunteering independently.

== Regional campuses ==
The University of Kentucky has also partnered with regional hospitals and schools to create satellite campuses, training agreements and a Rural Physician Leadership Program (RPLP) to help address the shortage of community-based physicians in the state of Kentucky. The University of Kentucky RPLP was developed in partnership with St. Claire Regional Medical Center and Morehead State University in Morehead, Kentucky. From its realization in 2008 to 2016, over 50 medical students have matriculated to the program to spend their third and fourth years of medical school being trained as rural physicians and leaders. In 2024, Rural Physician Leadership Program students at the Morehead campus received an NIH-funded pilot grant to start the Caring for Appalachians Through Service (CATS) Clinic, which is a student-run free clinic that operates in Morehead, Kentucky.

In partnership with Western Kentucky University and The Medical Center in Bowling Green, Kentucky, the University of Kentucky College of Medicine - Bowling Green Campus began training its inaugural class of 30 medical students in July 2018. This campus now also offers an early assurance program for undergraduates meeting certain criteria to gain guaranteed admission to the doctoral program upon completion of their university's graduation requirements.

In fall of 2019, the University of Kentucky opened another regional 4- year medical school campus in Northern Kentucky, as part of a partnership with St. Elizabeth Healthcare (Kentucky) and Northern Kentucky University. The inaugural class will be composed of 35 first-year medical students.

On January 29, 2021, the University of Kentucky announced a "significant partnership" between King's Daughters Medical Center in Ashland and UK HealthCare. A major part of this agreement, which officially went into force on April 1, 2021, included King's Daughters providing training opportunities for University of Kentucky College of Medicine students. In October 2022, the hospital and university announced plans for the university to acquire King's Daughters outright. The acquisition was finalized on December 1, 2022, with the hospital now being known as UK King's Daughters.

== Research projects ==
Professor Hannah Knudsen is currently performing a national study funded by the National Institute on Drug Abuse observing the impact of the Affordable Care Act on the availability and quality of Buprenorphrine treatment for patients with Opioid use disorders.

In October 2018, a project led by Professor Jennifer Havens received a $15 million federal grant along with $50 million in donated drug treatments in order to eradicate hepatitis C in Perry County, Kentucky. Dr. Havens' research focuses on eastern Kentucky drug users and Human Papillomavirus (HPV) outbreaks and endocarditis.

Associate Professor Peter Akpunonu is currently performing an international study funded by the Department of Defense and Ophirex observing the utility of Varespladib in crotalid envenomations.

Associate Professor with Tenure, Terry Hinds, Jr, along with Kyle Flack has a clinical trial at the University of Kentucky where they are studying obese humans and if increases in plasma bilirubin and exercise help lose weight faster.
