= University of Louisville Hospital =

- UofL Health
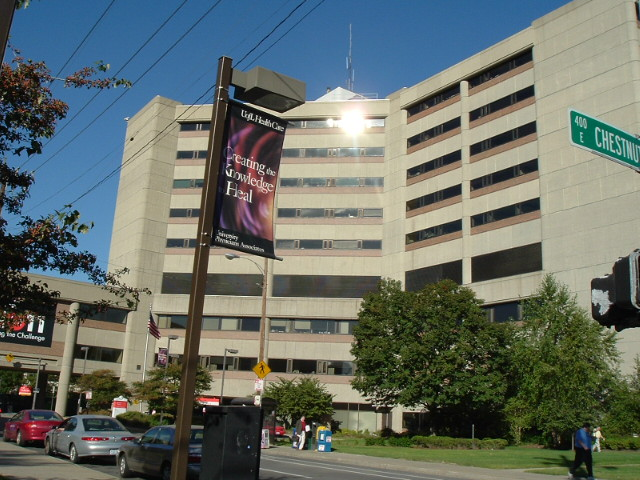

Geography
- Location: Louisville, Kentucky, United States
- Coordinates: 38°14′55″N 85°44′37″W

Organization
- Type: Teaching
- Affiliated university: University of Louisville

Services
- Emergency department: Level I trauma center
- Beds: 421

Helipads
- Helipad: FAA LID: 26KY

Links
- Website: uoflhealth.org/locations/uofl-hospital/
- Lists: Hospitals in Kentucky

University of Louisville Hospital is a non-profit, 421-bed teaching hospital located in downtown Louisville, Kentucky and is owned and operated by UofL Health.

== Facilities ==
The University of Louisville Hospital's J. David Richardson Trauma Center is the only Level I trauma center for adults in the region and is also a Joint Commission-certified comprehensive stroke center. The hospital additionally features the region's sole American Burn Association-verified adult burn center. The hospital's Center for Women & Infants offers labor and delivery services along with a level III neonatal intensive care unit. The University of Louisville Hospital is also home to the Brown Cancer Center, which provides treatment for a variety of cancers and coordinates blood and bone marrow transplant services.
