= Mercy Health Lourdes Hospital =

Non-profit hospital in Kentucky, USA

- Mercy Health

Geography
- Location: Paducah, Kentucky, United States
- Coordinates: 37°03′01″N 88°38′59″W

Organization
- Religious affiliation: Catholic
- Network: Mercy Health

Services
- Emergency department: Yes
- Beds: 306

Helipads
- Helipad: Yes, 01KY

History
- Former name: Riverside Hospital
- Opened: 1905

Links
- Website: https://www.mercy.com/locations/hospitals/paducah/lourdes-hospital
- Lists: Hospitals in Kentucky

Mercy Health — Lourdes Hospital is located in Paducah, Kentucky. It serves a wide geographic region, including more than a dozen counties in western Kentucky, southern Illinois, southeast Missouri, and northwest Tennessee. It is owned and operated by Mercy Health.

== History ==
Mercy Health — Lourdes Hospital was established in 1905 as Riverside Hospital in downtown Paducah. In 1959, the Diocese of Owensboro purchased the hospital, and the Sisters of St. Francis of Tiffin, Ohio, arrived to manage the facility. With the change in ownership, the hospital was renamed Lourdes Hospital in honor of Our Lady of Lourdes. In 1973, Lourdes Hospital moved from its downtown location to its current location on Lone Oak Road. The hospital joined the Catholic health care system Mercy Health in 1989. Over the years, the hospital has undergone significant renovations and expansions, including the construction of a new $12.5 million cancer center.

== Facilities ==
Mercy Health — Lourdes Hospital maintains 306 hospital beds. Key services include:

- Stroke Care
- Wound Care
- Maternity Care
- Breast Imaging
- Cardiology
- Oncology
- Orthopedic Services
- Hemodialysis
- Radiology
