= Mercy Health Springfield Regional Medical Center =

- Mercy Health

Geography
- Location: Springfield, Ohio, United States
- Coordinates: 39°57′34″N 83°48′59″W

Organization
- Religious affiliation: Catholic
- Network: Mercy Health

Services
- Emergency department: yes
- Beds: 234

Helipads
- Helipad: Yes, OH81

History
- Opened: 1950

Links
- Website: mercy.com/hospitals
- Lists: Hospitals in Ohio

Mercy Health — Springfield Regional Medical Center is a 234-bed non-profit hospital in Springfield, Ohio. The short-term acute care hospital is owned and operated by the non-profit Mercy Health.

== History ==
Mercy Health — Springfield Regional Medical Center opened in 1950 on the former grounds of the Knights of Pythias Orphanage. It was first called the Mercy Medical Center and later merged with Springfield Regional Medical Center Fountain Boulevard Campus before changing its name to Mercy Health — Springfield Regional Medical Center in 2017. In 2016 the last of the original buildings were demolished after sitting vacant for four years.

In 2019, Mercy Health named Adam Groshan as President of Mercy Health — Springfield.

== Facilities ==
Mercy Health — Springfield Regional Medical Center is a Short Term Acute Care hospital. Services include a 30-bed emergency department.

Inpatient services include cardiology, cardiovascular surgery, internal medicine, neurology, oncology, orthopedic surgery, orthopedics, psychiatry, pulmonology, urology and vascular surgery.
