= UofL Health =

Academic health system based in Louisville, Kentucky, U.S.

UofL Health is a regional academic health system based in Louisville, Kentucky, formed by the reorganization of KentuckyOne Health in conjunction with the acquisition of that system by the University of Louisville from Catholic Health Initiatives in 2019. The resulting health care system combined University of Louisville Hospital and the various hospitals and medical centers of KentuckyOne under one management umbrella. UofL Health is affiliated with the University of Louisville School of Medicine.
