= Russell, Kentucky =

- City
- Location of Russell in Greenup County, Kentucky.
- Coordinates: 38°31′5″N 82°41′52″W
- Country: United States
- State: Kentucky
- County: Greenup
- Incorporated: February 23, 1874
- Named for: John Russell, a local landowner

Government
  - Type: Mayor-Council
  - Mayor: Samuel "Ron" Simpson IV

Area
  - Total: 3.42 sq mi (8.87 km^{2})
  - Land: 3.41 sq mi (8.84 km^{2})
  - Water: 0.015 sq mi (0.04 km^{2})
- Elevation: 646 ft (197 m)

Population (2020)
  - Total: 3,744
  - Estimate (2024): 3,638
  - Density: 1,097.4/sq mi (423.69/km^{2})
- Time zone: UTC-5 (Eastern (EST))
  - Summer (DST): UTC-4 (EDT)
- ZIP code: 41169 (part in 41101)
- Area code: 606
- FIPS code: 21-67458
- GNIS feature ID: 0502497
- Website: www.russellky.net

Russell is a home rule-class city on the south bank of the Ohio River in Greenup County, Kentucky, United States. As of the 2020 census, Russell had a population of 3,744. Russell is a suburb of Ashland and part of the Huntington-Ashland-Ironton metropolitan area. It has close economic affiliations with its neighbors, Ashland and Flatwoods in Kentucky and Ironton, Ohio.

== History ==
In 1829, James E. McDowell, William Lindsay Poage, and his brother erected an iron furnace; they named the foundry and the community that grew up around it "Amanda Furnace" after William's infant daughter. The furnace ceased operation in 1861.

John Russell and his Means and Russell Iron Company purchased the land of the present city beside Amanda Hill from the Poage brothers. They laid out and established the town of Riverview in 1869 in expectation of an expansion of the Chesapeake and Ohio Railroad westward from Huntington, West Virginia, to Cincinnati, Ohio. Ferry service to Ohio began in 1870, local landowners agreed to rename the community after its founder in 1873, and the city was formally incorporated under the name "Russell" in 1874. The expected C&O spur did not arrive until 1889 but, when it did, it constructed a railyard, roundhouse, and shops and the city grew quickly. The city celebrates this influence with the annual "Russell Railroad Days" each August.

Numerous disasters limited the city's growth. The Ohio River flooded the city in 1884, smallpox struck in 1901, and a fire consumed downtown and the city hall in 1903. In 1905, it was still the largest city in Greenup County, but the Ohio flooded again in 1913 and 1937. The 1937 flood affected all but 30 homes, and over 500 people were forced to shelter in C&O boxcars and cabooses until the waters receded. Despite the completion of a bridge to Ironton in 1922 and a floodwall in 1950, Russell was no longer the county's largest municipality by the mid-1950s.

The Fortune 500 company Ashland Oil relocated its headquarters to Russell in 1974, but moved to the Cincinnati suburb of Covington in 1999.

== Geography ==
Russell is located in the eastern corner of Greenup County at 38°31′5″N 82°41′52″W (38.518176, -82.697680), directly across the Ohio River from Ironton, Ohio. It is bordered to the northwest by the city of Worthington, to the west by the city of Flatwoods, and to the south by the city of Bellefonte. The southeast border of Russell is the Boyd County line, separating Russell from the unincorporated community of Westwood. Downtown Ashland is 3 miles (5 km) southeast of Russell via U.S. Route 23.

According to the United States Census Bureau, the city of Russell has a total area of 3.0 square miles (7.8 km^{2}), of which 0.02 square miles (0.04 km^{2}), or 0.48%, is water.

== Demographics ==
Historical population
Census	Pop.	Note	%±
1880	175		—
1890	323		84.6%
1900	743		130.0%
1910	1,038		39.7%
1920	1,756		69.2%
1930	2,084		18.7%
1940	1,844		−11.5%
1950	1,681		−8.8%
1960	1,458		−13.3%
1970	2,925		100.6%
1980	3,824		30.7%
1990	4,014		5.0%
2000	3,645		−9.2%
2010	3,380		−7.3%
2020	3,744		10.8%
2024 (est.)	3,638		−2.8%
U.S. Decennial Census

=== 2020 census ===
As of the 2020 census, Russell had a population of 3,744. The median age was 44.9 years. 21.6% of residents were under the age of 18 and 25.1% of residents were 65 years of age or older. For every 100 females there were 95.4 males, and for every 100 females age 18 and over there were 92.1 males age 18 and over.

98.2% of residents lived in urban areas, while 1.8% lived in rural areas.

There were 1,443 households in Russell, of which 32.6% had children under the age of 18 living in them. Of all households, 56.9% were married-couple households, 13.3% were households with a male householder and no spouse or partner present, and 23.8% were households with a female householder and no spouse or partner present. About 23.3% of all households were made up of individuals and 14.3% had someone living alone who was 65 years of age or older.

There were 1,621 housing units, of which 11.0% were vacant. The homeowner vacancy rate was 2.7% and the rental vacancy rate was 15.5%.

Racial composition as of the 2020 census
Race	Number	Percent
White	3,469	92.7%
Black or African American	25	0.7%
American Indian and Alaska Native	7	0.2%
Asian	96	2.6%
Native Hawaiian and Other Pacific Islander	0	0.0%
Some other race	16	0.4%
Two or more races	131	3.5%
Hispanic or Latino (of any race)	42	1.1%

=== 2000 census ===
As of the census of 2000, there were 3,645 people, 1,428 households, and 1,106 families residing in the city. The population density was 910.5 inhabitants per square mile (351.5/km^{2}). There were 1,584 housing units at an average density of 395.7 per square mile (152.8/km^{2}). The racial makeup of the city was 96.49% White, 0.71% African American, 0.03% Native American, 2.14% Asian, 0.22% from other races, and 0.41% from two or more races. Hispanic or Latino people of any race were 0.82% of the population.

There were 1,428 households, out of which 30.0% had children under the age of 18 living with them, 67.6% were married couples living together, 7.1% had a female householder with no husband present, and 22.5% were non-families. 20.2% of all households were made up of individuals, and 8.9% had someone living alone who was 65 years of age or older. The average household size was 2.50 and the average family size was 2.88.

In the city the population was spread out, with 21.7% under the age of 18, 7.1% from 18 to 24, 25.1% from 25 to 44, 29.7% from 45 to 64, and 16.4% who were 65 years of age or older. The median age was 43 years. For every 100 females, there were 94.6 males. For every 100 females age 18 and over, there were 91.5 males.

The median income for a household in the city was $53,869, and the median income for a family was $62,018. Males had a median income of $50,306 versus $30,494 for females. The per capita income for the city was $29,453. About 4.1% of families and 6.0% of the population were below the poverty line, including 11.1% of those under age 18 and 2.1% of those age 65 or over.

== Economy ==
=== Industrial ===
Part of AK Steel's Ashland Works is located in Russell. Russell was also once home to the headquarters of Ashland Global, a diversified chemical company. The two-building headquarters was located on Kentucky Route 1725 (Ashland Drive), with another facility on KY 693 (Diederich Boulevard). The company has since relocated to Covington. One of the buildings was purchased by Our Lady of Bellefonte Hospital and was known as Bellefonte Pavilion during the hospital's ownership. That building is now owned by Ashland-based King's Daughters Medical Center, has been renamed King's Daughters Pavilion and houses many of the hospital's business offices. The other building, which was named Bellefonte Centre, is privately owned and is used as physician and clinic offices along with rental office space.

=== Transportation ===
The city has a large railroad classification yard, built by the Chesapeake and Ohio Railway and now owned and operated by CSX Transportation. The C&O Rail Yard was formerly the largest individually-owned rail yard in the world.

Vehicles may cross the Ohio River via the Ironton–Russell Bridge or the Ben Williamson Memorial Bridge in Ashland. A new Ironton-Russell Bridge, opened in 2016, connects downtown Ironton with U.S. 23 and KY 244 just south of downtown Russell. The original Ironton-Russell Bridge, which connected downtown Ironton directly with Willow Street in downtown Russell, opened in 1922, closed when the new bridge opened in 2016 and was demolished in late 2016–early 2017.

=== Medical ===
Our Lady of Bellefonte Hospital was a 214-bed not-for-profit acute care hospital located in Russell from 1953 to 2020. The hospital was part of the Catholic-based Bon Secours Health System Inc. Our Lady of Bellefonte Hospital employed approximately 1,200 healthcare professionals, making the hospital the largest employer in Greenup County when it was open. Many of the hospital's former outpatient facilities in Russell have been absorbed by UK King's Daughters in Ashland.

== Education ==
Russell's students are served by Russell Independent Schools, which it shares with its neighbors, Flatwoods and Bellefonte. The main campus, which includes Russell High School, Russell Middle School, Russell Primary School and the Russell Area Technology Center, sits on the Russell/Flatwoods city line (all of the schools' mailing addresses are Russell, but they receive primary police and fire protection from Flatwoods).

The Russell High School football field is home to a fire-breathing Red Devil, the school's mascot Rudy, who sits atop the scoreboard. Russell High School was the 1978 Kentucky State 3A football champion, as well as the 2005 Kentucky State 2A football champion.

== Notable people ==
- Danny Bentley, American politician born in Russell
- Billy Ray Cyrus, Country Music Star from nearby Flatwoods
- Charlie Honaker, professional football player
- Bill McCutcheon, Emmy and Tony award-winning actor
- Amanda Noelle, Christian musician and worship leader
- Ernest E. West, recipient of the Medal of Honor for his actions in the Korean War

== See also ==
- List of cities and towns along the Ohio River
