= Mercy Health St. Rita's Medical Center =

Geography
- Location: Lima, Ohio, United States
- Coordinates: 40.7409°N 84.1184°W

Organization
- Care system: Mercy Health Partners
- Type: Roman Catholic
- Affiliated university: None

Services
- Emergency department: Level II trauma center
- Beds: 425

Helipads
- Helipad: FAA LID: 94OH

History
- Founded: 1918

Links
- Website: https://www.mercy.com/en/lima
- Lists: Hospitals in Ohio

Mercy Health — St. Rita's Medical Center is a large hospital serving a 70-mile radius of Lima, Ohio, United States. It was started in 1918 by Sisters of Mercy, an order of Roman Catholic women founded by Catherine McAuley in Dublin, Ireland in 1831. The hospital is owned and operated by the non-profit Mercy Health.

== History ==
In 1918, the Sisters of Mercy opened a hospital in Lima, Ohio.

St. Rita's was the fulfillment of a dream of the Right Reverend Monsignor A.E. Manning, the Reverend William Tobin and Mother Bernardine McMullen, R.S.M. At the time of its opening, the hospital was not completely finished, but was opened in order to administer care to victims of one of the first and most devastating epidemics to plague the Lima area, the Spanish flu influenza pandemic of 1918.

Through the coming years, St. Rita's expanded to add more beds and services to meet the healthcare needs of the community. In 1948, a seven-story addition to the original building was completed which housed modern operating, delivery and X-ray rooms, more office space and an additional 150 beds. Just nine years later, it again became apparent that new facilities, additional beds, and a School of Nursing building would be needed to keep St. Rita's Hospital on the updated move to provide quality medical care for the people of Allen and surrounding counties.

In 1970, Dr. C. John Stechschulte, Dr. Thomas Weis, and Dr. Michael Hattwick treated symptomatic rabies in Matt Winkler, then 6, for the first time in history at St. Rita's.

After 59 years as St. Rita's Hospital, on March 9, 1977, the hospital name was changed to St. Rita's Medical Center.

In 2007, St. Rita's opened “The Medical Center of The Future.” The campus now looks more like a university campus stretching six blocks with covered walkways, ponds, water fountains, gardens and a track for walking and running.

== Facilities ==
The Henry & Beverly Hawk Heart Center expanded services in 2008 and became The Henry & Beverly Hawk Heart and Vascular Center and now offers vascular screening tests for blockages in the carotid artery, blockages in the legs from peripheral arterial disease and Aortic aneurysm, bulging of the main artery.

In 2008, St. Rita's purchased Lima Allen County Paramedics (LACP) and operates the service of emergency/911 response, interfacility transfers, and Ambulette transports.

In 2018 St. Rita's Medical Center experienced a name change to its parent company's name, Mercy Health. Almost immediately after this change Mercy Health, Mercy Health St. Rita's Medical Center, and all other hospitals owned by Mercy Health were merged into a larger group from the east coast, Bon Secours. This merge has brought no changes to the hospital.

Mercy Health St. Rita's Medical Center is currently in the process of building an on-site education center with multiple classrooms and a 250-seat lecture hall. This expansion will focus on educating up and coming doctors.
