= UK King's Daughters =

Coordinates: 38°28′15″N 82°38′4″W

- UK HealthCare (Royal Blue Health, LLC)

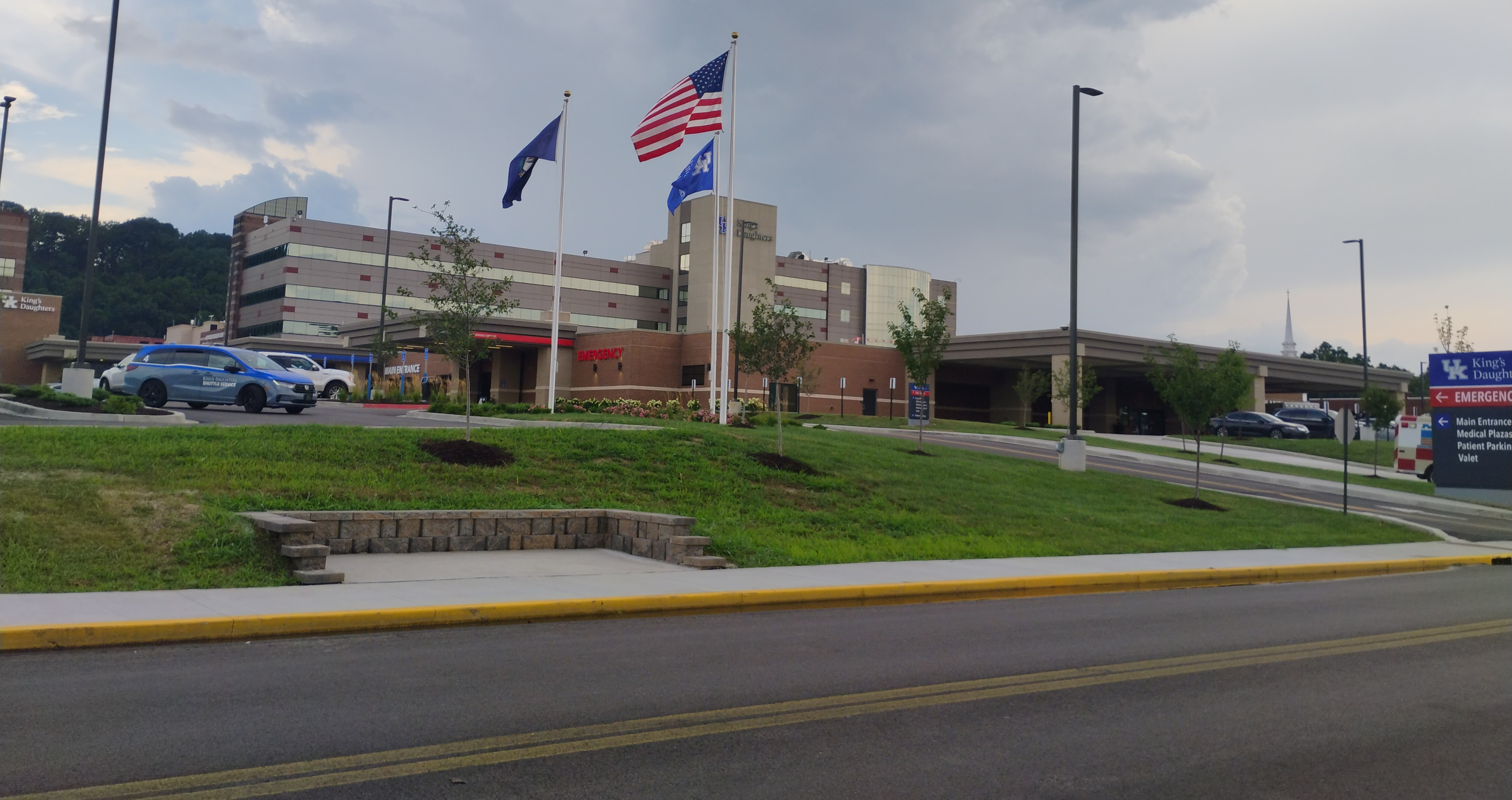
- Main Entrance and Emergency Department

Geography
- Location: Ashland, Kentucky, United States

Organization
- Care system: Private, Not-For-Profit
- Type: General
- Affiliated university: University of Kentucky College of Medicine

Services
- Emergency department: Level IV,
- Beds: 465

Helipads
- Helipad: FAA LID: 4KY9

History
- Founded: 1899

Links
- Website: www.kingsdaughtershealth.com
- Lists: Hospitals in Kentucky

King's Daughters Medical Center (KDMC), operating under the name UK King's Daughters, is a hospital system based in Ashland, Kentucky which is the city's largest employer at over 4,000 employees, generating more than $200 million in payroll a year. The hospital, which is owned by the University of Kentucky, is a locally managed, not-for-profit 465-bed facility that offers "cardiac, medical, surgical, pediatric, rehabilitative, psychiatric, cancer, neurological, pain care, wound care and home care" services.

== History ==
=== Early history ===
King's Daughters' Hospital opened in 1897 as a three-room emergency hospital over the Poage, Elliott and Poage Drug Store on Winchester Avenue near 16th Street. In 1899, the hospital itself was founded by the What-so-ever Circle of the International Order of the King's Daughters and Sons and moved to a seven-room building at 18th Street and Greenup Avenue. Ten years later, the hospital moved again to a nine-room building between 20th and 21st Street along Winchester Avenue.

In 1915, the hospital purchased property at the northeast corner of 22nd Street and Lexington Avenue. Two years later in November, it opened a new 50-bed facility in a two-story brick structure. An expansion in 1930–31 added an east wing, which was expanded again in 1945 and 1953, all to the east.

In 1958, that building closed and a new administration building was completed across Lexington Avenue and the remainder of the hospital.

=== Developing into a modern facility ===
In 1963, the hospital began to study plans for a specialized Coronary Care Unit. The hospital expanded in 1965 with a northern extension. In 1967, a 24-hour emergency department was established. One year later, the Coronary Care Unit opens with four private patient rooms and a ten-bed Intensive Care Unit.

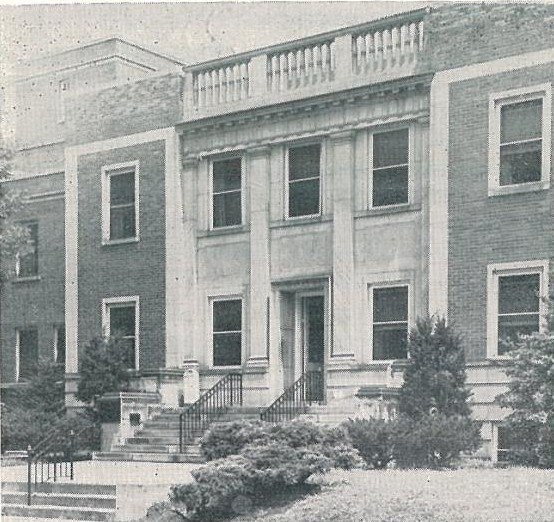
The main entrance to King's Daughters (the current location of the Lexington Avenue entrance), as it looked in the mid-1950s

In 1968, the hospital expanded upon the 1953 extension with a two-story structure; this was expanded upward with an additional two levels in 1984. With the extension, the hospital now stretched from 22nd Street to 23rd Street. One year after the hospital was expanded upon, the Ashland Medical Arts Building was completed in 1969 at the corner of Lexington Avenue and 23rd Street.

In 1972, a new emergency department was completed. Six years later, the Cardiac Step Down Unit and Cardiac Rehabilitation opened, followed by the Echocardiology Department in 1981 and the Diabetes Clinic in the following year.

The hospital expanded northward again in 1984 to Montgomery Avenue. In 1986, a new 16-bed Intensive Care Unit was completed, followed by the opening of the Cardiac Catheterization Lab one year later. The Cardiac Lab was expanded in 1993 and again in 1994 with the addition of a second laboratory.

In 1985, the Tri-State Regional Cancer Center opened adjacent to the Medical Arts Building. In 1988, a new facade and lobby with atrium was completed along Lexington Avenue; the new lobby was constructed within the 1953 addition. During this year, the original 1917 hospital structure was demolished in favor of the Tri-State Diagnostics center.

In 1990, a four level parking structure was completed along Lexington Avenue. A medical library and health education center was completed in the lower level of the parking garage in 1992. Three years later, a new 22-bed emergency department was completed along 23rd Street. Three years later, a third Cardiac Lab and a 24-bed Cardiac Surgery Unit was opened.

The $32 million Center for Advanced Care, now known as the Parkview Patient Tower 1, was completed in November 2000. It features a 24-bed Intensive Care Unit, 3 Cardiac Cath Labs bringing the total to five, a Cardiac Cath Lab pre-op and recovery areas, three dedicated Cardiothoracic surgery operating suites, a nine-bed Cardiovascular Recovery Unit, and a rooftop helipad. The Vascular/endovascular program was initiated at this time, the Cardiac Alert Unit was installed in the former Intensive Care Unit and the emergency department expanded to 45 beds. Three years later, Cardiac Alert Unit became a 10-bed Chest Pain Unit, expanding to 18-beds in 2005.

=== Campus expansion ===
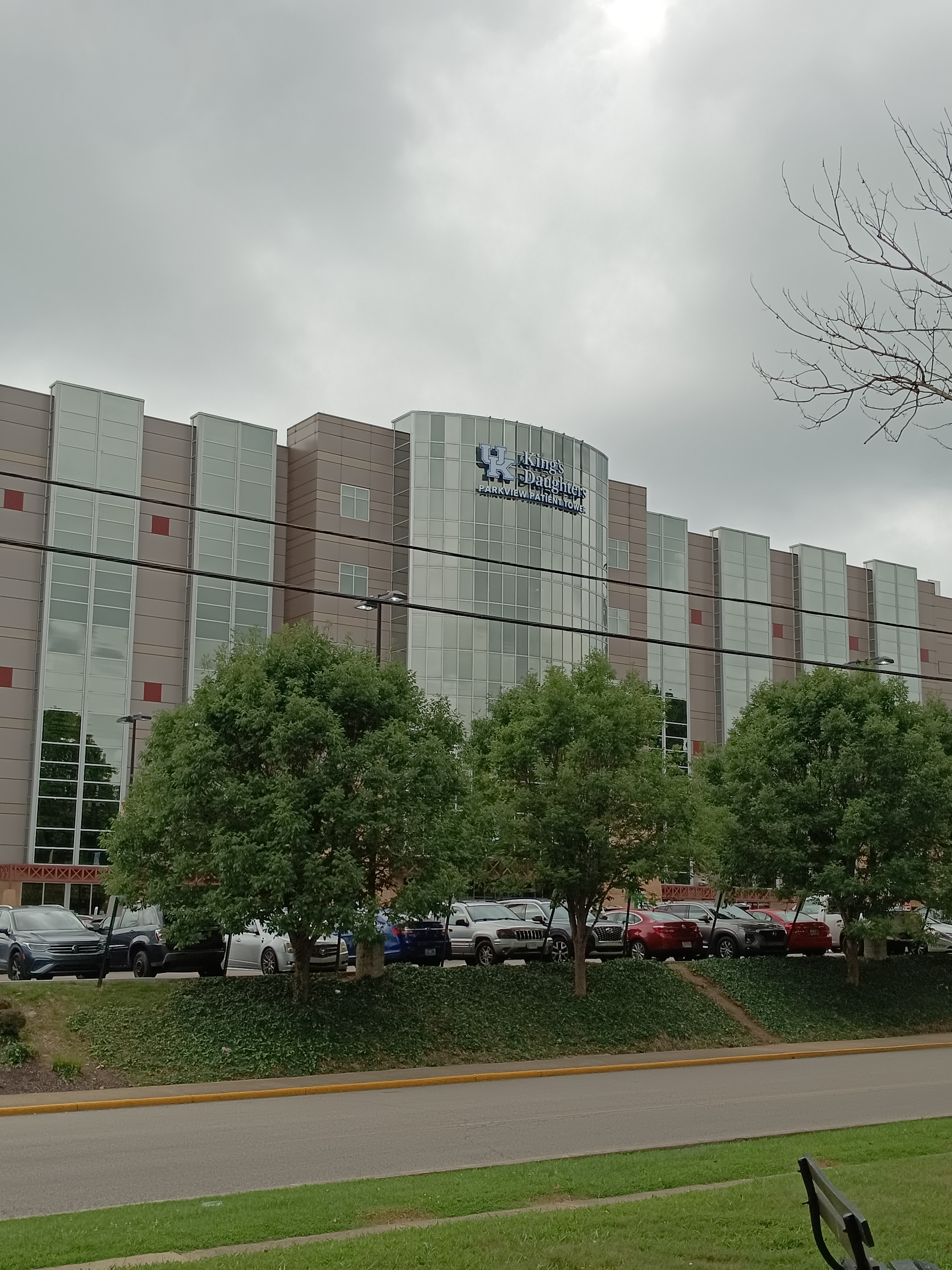
Parkview Patient Tower 2

Medical Plaza A, opened in 1998, and was originally constructed as a three-story building providing room for physician offices, a Wendy's fast-food restaurant, a National City Bank (now City National Bank) branch and a cafe. It was expanded in 2002 to five stories, and in 2003 the Outpatient Surgery Center opened on the building's third floor.

In 2000, a new five-story structure was completed along 22nd Street facing Central Park that provided new patient rooms, cardiothoracic surgery facilities, Intensive Care Unit and rooftop helipad. The Parkview Patient Tower 1 features an entrance, which served as the hospital's main entrance from 2000 until 2025, and the Parkview Cafe dining facility.

The 526-space parking structure at the corner of 23rd Street and Bath Avenue was completed and opened on March 22, 2005. The $5.5 million five-story facility can be utilized by patients, visitors, physicians and employees.

In the summer of 2005, the $2.3 million 12,000 sq ft (1,100 m^{2}). Hospitality House at King's Daughters opened at the corner of 22nd Street and Central Avenue. Providing 13 guest rooms, a kitchen, dining area, living space and a reception area for those that are from out-of-town. It is styled to resemble a contemporary house and is adjacent to the northeast corner of Central Park. It celebrated its 1,000th family on February 6, 2007.

On May 3, 2005, Medical Plaza B, a four-story, 77,000 sq ft (7,200 m^{2}). facility that houses 14 physician offices, the Surgical Weight Loss Center and a pharmacy opened. It is connected via a sky bridge to the 23rd Street Parking Garage.

On May 8, 2006, a new $60 million 200,000 sq ft (19,000 m^{2})., five-story Heart and Vascular Center, now known as Parkview Patient Tower 2, opened along 22nd Street. Envisioned as a three-story $43.5 million facility, a rising demand in services relating to cardiac and heart care necessitated the expansion of the hospital while it was under construction. It features a "cardiac rehabilitation unit, a therapy pool, administrative offices, admitting and pre-admission testing areas, a chest pain unit, patient rooms for stress testing, outpatient diagnostic testing and procedures, cardiac catheterization laboratories and vascular surgery suites and beds."

On June 5, 2006, a new $2.3 million two-story 18,000 sq ft (1,700 m^{2}). Center for Advanced Imaging opened along Central Avenue adjacent to the Hospitality House at a cost of $13.3 million. Construction began in October 2005 and was designed to free up space in the existing hospital complex for inpatient and emergency radiology. The center is home to outpatient radiology, MRI, CT scans, mammograms, ultrasounds and X-rays; part of the second floor is dedicated to breast care. The completion of the Outpatient Imaging Center was the last component of a four-building, $70 million expansion that was announced in 2004.

The hospital announced in summer 2022 the construction of a new centralized main entrance, emergency department, coffee shop, outpatient pharmacy and radiology facility. The new, $160 million facility was constructed on a former parking lot on Central Avenue and is connected to the existing Medical Plaza B and Parkview Patient Tower 2 over the former Bath Avenue. The new main entrance, along with 260 dedicated patient and visitor parking spaces, opened on May 12, 2025. The new 200,000 sq ft (19,000 m^{2}) emergency department, which includes over 60 private treatment rooms, private triage rooms; a 12 bay facility for treating minor illnesses and injuries; two trauma rooms with two bays each along with a dedicated CT machine for each room; an isolation facility with a dedicated entrance along with three patient rooms and one indoor and three outdoor decontamination showers; EMS workspace and an eight-bed emergency behavioral health facility with a dedicated entrance that can also be used by law enforcement personnel, opened on June 18, 2025.

The hospital also features an Outpatient Services Center on Central Avenue, across the street from the main hospital entrance, where audiology services, physical, occupational and speech therapy is offered. A drive-thru outpatient lab facility is located near the Outpatient Services Center on Carter Avenue.

== Union representation ==
The Service and Maintenance employees at King's Daughters Medical Center have been represented by the Service Employees International Union/District 1199 WV/KY/OH since 1980. The union currently represents approximately 600 employees in various classifications including: Central Supply Aides, Laboratory Clerks, Home Health Clerks, Maintenance Department Employees, Medical Records Clerks, Dietary Employees, Environmental Services Employees, and Respiratory Aides. The current Collective Bargaining Agreement expired in November, 2022.

== Twenty-first century ==
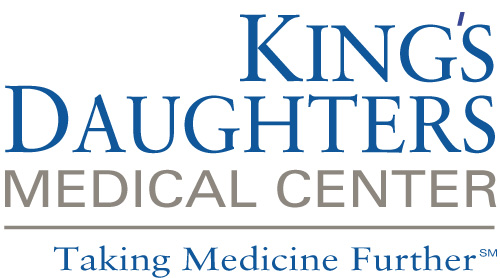
KDMC logo until 2023. This logo is still seen in parts of the hospital campus and at some off-campus facilities.

The hospital ranks fourth in the state of Kentucky in admissions and with number of employees at 5,000, making it the largest employer between Lexington and Charleston, West Virginia. It has been named one of America's top employers from 2002 to 2006 and was a recipient of the Commonwealth of Kentucky Quality Award from 2000 to 2002. It was also named one of the nation's Top 100 Hospitals by Solucient from 2005 to 2008, and was also named as one of the "100 Best Companies for Working Mothers" by Working Mother Magazine from 2003 to 2005.

The Chest Pain Unit also received accreditation in 2004 from the Society of Chest Pain Centers, making it the third such facility in Kentucky and the 78th in the United States. It is also ranked number one in the state and among the top 5% in the nation for cardiac surgery and is the recipient of HealthGrades 2007 Cardiac Surgery Excellence Award.

King's Daughters Medical Center went live with the Epic electronic medical record system in November 2008.

King's Daughters Medical Center Ohio, a ten-bed acute care hospital in Portsmouth, Ohio, opened in February 2013. The facility provides a variety of inpatient and outpatient services and is the location of KDMC's Portsmouth Urgent Care facility.

King's Daughters and the Greenup County Fiscal Court announced that the hospital would be purchasing the former Bellefonte Pavilion in Russell from the fiscal court. The facility, which originally housed Ashland Oil's petroleum division and includes the former Ashland Oil heliport, had been donated to the county by Bon Secours Mercy Health as part of the 2020 closing of Russell's Our Lady of Bellefonte Hospital (OLBH). The hospital eventually moved approximately 300 non-clinical employees from the hospital campus and other locations in Ashland to the building, which was renamed King's Daughters Pavilion. This allowed expansion of clinical services on the hospital campus and resulted in the creation of approximately 150 additional jobs. Prior to the hospital fully occupying the building in spring 2021, KDMC moved their COVID-19 vaccination clinic from the hospital campus to the King's Daughters Pavilion in February 2020. This was due to the Pavilion's expansive space and large parking lot, which allows easier patient access compared to the main hospital campus in downtown Ashland as well as gave the hospital the ability to vaccinate more than 1,000 people a day. King's Daughters had previously absorbed many of OLBH's off-site facilities including many of OLBH's medical providers as well as facilities such as the Vitality Center physical and occupational therapy facility on the former OLBH main campus. KDMC also hired a large number of OLBH nursing and support staff.

In February 2025, UK King's Daughters announced the purchase of the Bellefonte Centre building in Russell from private investors. This building, located next to King's Daughters Pavilion and originally housing Ashland Oil's corporate headquarters, was renamed King's Daughters Health Park and will house outpatient clinical facilities including provider offices, lab and imaging facilities and the hospital's sleep lab. At the same time, the hospital announced the construction of a $7 million medical facility in the city of Greenup. This building, which is expected to open in summer or autumn of 2026, will house an urgent care facility, imaging services and a family care center, with the providers at the current primary care office in Greenup moving to the new facility.

=== University of Kentucky ownership ===
On January 29, 2021, the hospital and the University of Kentucky announced a "significant partnership" between King's Daughters and UK HealthCare. As part of this agreement, a new governing board with equal representation from both organizations was formed. King's Daughters then-President and CEO Kristi Whitlatch remained in that role but will also become a member of UK HealthCare's management team. The partnership, which includes access to UK HealthCare's pediatric cardiology and pharmacy program as well as expanded access to the Markey Cancer Center and training opportunities within King's Daughters for University of Kentucky College of Medicine students, officially went into force on April 1, 2021. In October 2022, the hospital and university announced plans for the university to acquire King's Daughters outright. The acquisition was finalized on December 1, 2022, with King's Daughters becoming a part of the University of Kentucky that day.
