= Charlie Honaker =

American football player (1899–1974)

- Honaker in 1922

Profile
- Positions: End, halfback

Personal information
- Born: October 11, 1899; Russell, Kentucky, U.S.
- Died: April 21, 1974 (aged 74)
- Listed height: 5 ft 11 in (1.80 m)
- Listed weight: 185 lb (84 kg)

Career history
- Cleveland Bulldogs (1924)
- Stats at Pro Football Reference

Charles Franklin "Honey" Honaker (October 11, 1899 – April 21, 1974) was an American professional football player.

== Early life ==
Honaker was born on October 11, 1899, in Russell, Kentucky. He later attended Huntington High School, in Huntington, West Virginia.

== Career ==
Honaker attended Ohio State and became a multi time letterman. Wearing the #12, he went on to play six games, starting in two, in the early National Football League, for the NFL Champion Cleveland Bulldogs in 1924.
