= Mercy Health St. Elizabeth Youngstown Hospital =

Hospital in Knoxville, Tennessee

St. Elizabeth Youngstown Hospital
- Mercy Health

Geography
- Location: Youngstown, Ohio, United States
- Coordinates: 41°06′50″N 80°39′25″W

Organization
- Network: Mercy Health

Services
- Emergency department: Level I trauma center
- Beds: 409

Helipads
- Helipad: Yes

History
- Opened: 1911

Links
- Website: www.mercy.com/locations/hospitals/youngstown/mercy-health-st-elizabeth-youngstown-hospital
- Lists: Hospitals in Ohio

Mercy Health St. Elizabeth Youngstown Hospital is a 409-bed non-profit hospital in Youngstown, Ohio. It is owned and operated by Mercy Health.

== History ==
The planning for St. Elizabeth Youngstown Hospital began on July 19, 1909, when local laymen and Catholic clergy met and began planning for a new Catholic hospital for the City of Youngstown. The hospital officially opened on December 8, 1911, and was initially run by the Sisters of the Humility of Mary. The North Building, the hospital's first permanent structure, opened with 200 beds on January 14, 1915. The hospital became certified as a Level I trauma center in 1995.

== Facilities ==
St. Elizabeth Youngstown Hospital is a Level I trauma center and certified thrombectomy-capable stroke center.
