= Lexington VA Medical Center =

- Veterans Health Administration
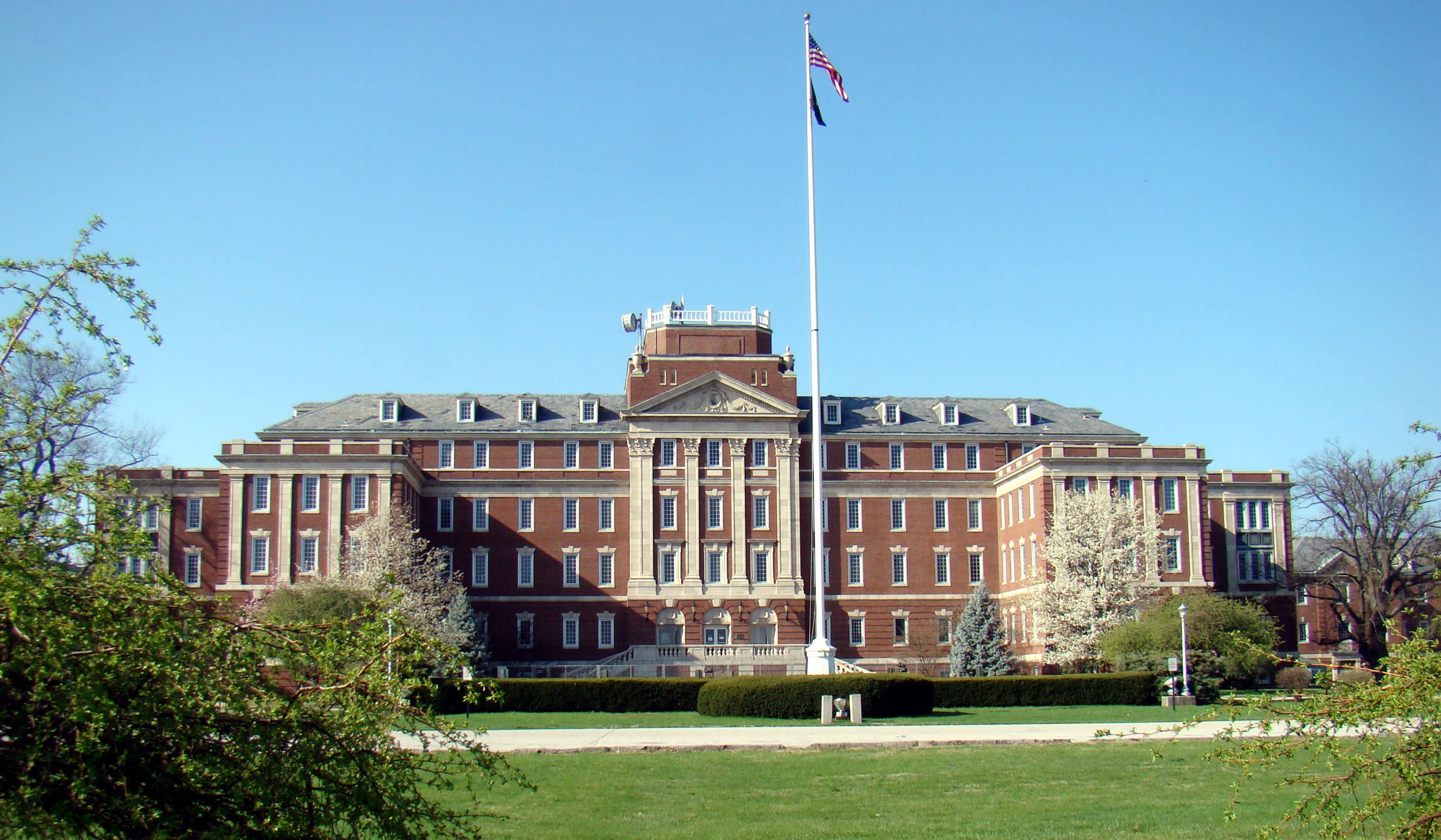
- Leestown Road Division

Geography
- Location: 1101 Veterans Drive (Cooper Division); 2250 Leestown Road (Leestown Division), Lexington, Kentucky, United States
- Coordinates: 38.074°N 84.538°W

Organization
- Affiliated university: University of Kentucky

Services
- Beds: 199

History
- Founded: 1931

Links
- Website: http://www.lexington.va.gov/
- Lists: Hospitals in Kentucky
- Other links: List of hospitals in the United States

Lexington Veterans Affairs Medical Center, located in Lexington, Kentucky, is a 199-bed medical facility owned by the United States Department of Veterans Affairs. The Lexington Veterans Affairs Medical Center is a fully accredited, two-division, tertiary care medical center with an operating bed complement of 199 hospital beds. Acute medical, neurological, surgical and psychiatric inpatient services are provided at the Cooper Division, located adjacent to the University of Kentucky Medical Center. Other available services include: emergency care, medical-surgical units, acute psychiatry, ICU, progressive care unit, (includes Cardiac Cath Lab) ambulatory surgery, OR/PACU, hemodialysis, medicine specialty clinics, surgery specialty clinics, and outpatient primary and specialty care.

The Leestown Division (LD), located five miles from Cooper Drive, offers inpatient Post-Traumatic Stress Disorder (PTSD) treatment, nursing home care, hospice and respite services, home based primary care, prosthestics and orthotics, geriatrics, optometry, mental health, and substance abuse treatment as well as primary care and women health. Plans for an inpatient substance abuse treatment program, a teleretinal unit, and a polytrauma unit are underway.

The veteran population in Lexington's primary service area is estimated at more than 92,000. The Lexington VA Medical Center is part of the VA MidSouth Healthcare Network, which consists of six VA medical centers in Kentucky, Tennessee, and West Virginia with community-based outpatient clinics (CBOCs) in those states as well as Arkansas, Mississippi, Virginia, and Indiana.

Currently, the Lexington VA Medical Center operates four community-based outpatient clinics (CBOC) in Berea, Somerset, Morehead, and Hazard to provide primary care services to veterans located outside the Lexington area.

== History ==
The Lexington Veterans Affairs Medical Center was established in 1931 as part of the newly created Veterans Administration.

The campus was listed on the National Register of Historic Places in 2012 (NR# - 12000150)

The campus name was changed to Franklin Runyon Sousley VA Hospital in 2018.
