= Our Lady of Bellefonte Hospital =

Former hospital in Russell, Kentucky, U.S.

- Bon Secours Mercy Health
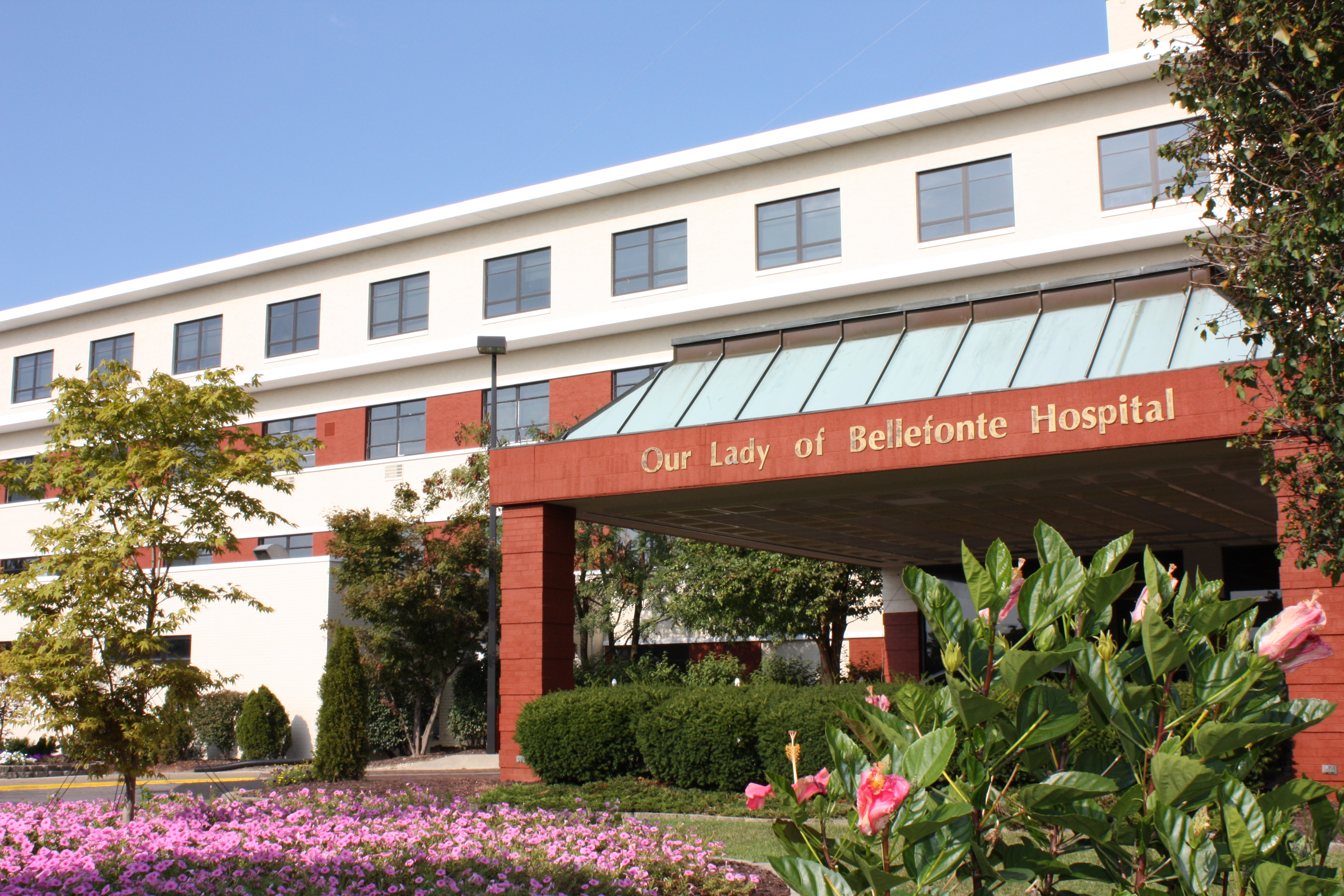
- OLBH main hospital

Geography
- Location: 1100 St. Christopher Drive, Ashland, Kentucky 41101 (physical location of the main campus is in Russell, Kentucky), Kentucky
- Coordinates: 38.508414°N 82.692385°W

Organisation
- Care system: Private, Not-For-Profit
- Type: General
- Affiliated university: University of Pikeville Kentucky College of Osteopathic Medicine

Services
- Emergency department: Yes
- Beds: 214

History
- Founded: July 14, 1953
- Closed: April 30, 2020

Links
- Website: www.bonsecours.com

Our Lady of Bellefonte Hospital was a 214-bed not-for-profit acute care hospital located in Russell, Kentucky (with a mailing address of Ashland, Kentucky) in the Tri-State region of Northeast Kentucky, Southern Ohio, and Western West Virginia. Part of the Catholic-based Bon Secours Kentucky Health System, Inc., Our Lady of Bellefonte Hospital employed approximately 1,200 healthcare professionals, making the hospital the largest employer in Greenup County.

== History ==
=== Early history ===
The Franciscan Sisters of the Poor, a congregation of Catholic sisters, received repeated requests from residents of different parts of Kentucky during the 1950s to open a hospital or social service center. In 1953, a group of concerned citizens approached the Most Reverend William T. Malloy, Bishop of Covington, and asked for his help in creating a new hospital called Our Lady of Bellefonte Hospital (OLBH). Construction started in 1952 on a 31-acre (13 ha) tract, 4 miles (6.4 km) from downtown Ashland, Ky. At the time, the tract only was accessible by a small dirt road.

The official dedication of the hospital took place July 14, 1953 and included a reading of a cablegram from Pope Pius XII. It read, "Our Holy Father deeply grateful, learned forthcoming inauguration, Our Lady of Bellefonte Hospital, Ashland, Kentucky, sends cordial felicitations. Invokes God's special blessings, praiseworthy project. Imparts Your Excellency, priests, religious, faithful, and hospital staff, fraternal Apostolic Benediction."

Upon opening, the hospital had 92 beds and 40 bassinets. In March 1956, the road leading to the hospital was blacktopped and during the summer, a new highway, U.S. 23, was laid, thus reducing by about one-third the distance from Ashland to the hospital.

=== Growth through the years ===
In 1963, a fund-raising project was initiated for expansion including additional beds for adult patients, a pediatric unit, and an air-conditioning unit for an additional floor. The fourth floor addition was completed in 1966 and brought the hospital's bed capacity to 126 with 22 pediatric beds and 19 medical-surgical beds. In the late 1970s the emergency room began serving patients 24 hours a day. The third floor of the hospital was renovated and the first Intensive/Coronary Care Unit opened in 1979. In 1981, expansion provided new areas for the Emergency Room, Radiology, Laboratory, Physical Therapy and Respiratory Therapy. OLBH's first chemical dependency program was established December 21, 1981.

Continued expansion began in 1982 and included a new surgical unit and a seven-bed recovery area. Significant capital improvements took place in 1986 including the opening of a new rehabilitation and wellness center, a kidney dialysis center, a 116-car parking garage and a mental health/chemical dependency center that today operates as the Bellefonte Behavioral Health Center.

A wellness/rehabilitation center called the Vitality Center opened in 1992. The center featured an indoor track and rehabilitation-size swimming pool along with a variety of fitness equipment. The hospital opened a 24-bed addition in 1994. The addition created extra patient rooms and meeting space on each of the hospital's four floors. The second floor featured specially designed rooms for oncology treatments.

In 1994, OLBH began an outreach program, opening walk-in primary medical care facilities in several outlying communities. The centers offered many basic services onsite and were designed for non-emergency medical care. The original centers were located in South Shore, Cannonsburg, Grayson and Flatwoods. The areas were later served through OLBH's sister organization, Bellefonte Physician Services. In addition to the original locations, Bellefonte Physician Services operated primary-care facilities in Ashland, Greenup and Ironton, Ohio. In 1995, ground was broken for the Same Day Surgery Center which was completed in January 1998.

=== Expansion in the modern era ===
In 1999 the Franciscan Sisters of the Poor Health System announced plans to disband. In 2000, OLBH was purchased by the Bon Secours Health System, Inc. of Baltimore, Maryland. OLBH introduced the Ashland-area's first sleep lab in 2002. In an effort to assist in training physicians, OLBH began a resident program in 2002 in conjunction with the University of Pikeville Kentucky College of Osteopathic Medicine. OLBH launched a mobile medical facility, known as the OLBH Mobile Health Center, in 2002. In 2004, OLBH became the first tenant of the former Ashland Inc. headquarters building, which was renamed Bellefonte Centre. The hospital would use the building for additional services, hospital departments and events.

In 2005, OLBH introduced the Human Motion concept, an approach to musculoskeletal injuries and orthopedic issues and becomes the area's first hospital to offer 64-slice CT technology. Also In 2005, OLBH opens its first new services at Bellefonte Centre with the unveiling of the OLBH Diabetes & Wound Care Center in March followed by the area's first freestanding hospital outpatient imaging center, the OLBH Imaging Center.

In 2007, hospital comparison information released by the federal government establishes OLBH as the Tri-State-area's leading medical facility in the care of pneumonia and number one in Ashland for two important categories relating to heart failure. Also that year, OLBH unveiled the hospital's new $2.5 million endoscopy lab, the first phase of a $5 million hospital expansion.

OLBH purchased the Addington Corporate Center located adjacent to Bellefonte Centre in 2008 to use for future growth, renaming the building Bellefonte Pavilion. The purchase price for the one-time Ashland Oil Petroleum Building was $2.8 million. 2008 was a major expansion year at OLBH, as the hospital unveiled the OLBH Women's Center, a $1.1 million all-encompassing facility that created a "one stop shop" for area women. The center offered GE Full Field digital mammography, the daily presence of an OLBH surgeon, clinical breast examinations, breast ultrasound, surgical consultations, minimally invasive breast biopsy, a DEXA densitometer to screen for bone density, a retail boutique and a women's health library. In 2008, the Same Day Surgery Center was renovated, completing a $5 million expansion to increase surgery capacity in addition to a $3.1 million surgery expansion at the hospital which added operating capacity for inpatient surgeries.

Building on its orthopedics reputation, Human Motion OrthoCare opened in September 2008. The new orthopedic unit on the hospital's fourth floor was dedicated exclusively to the care of orthopedic patients.

=== 2008–2020 ===
In 2008, OLBH received four five-star distinctions from the independent Professional Research Consultants (PRC). The five-star patient satisfaction honors indicates ranking in the top 10 percent in the US. The following year, in addition to two patient satisfaction honors, the hospital received four five-star and four four-star awards from PRC based on physician satisfaction scores.

In 2009, HealthGrades, a national independent healthcare ratings organization, presented OLBH with its Pulmonary Care Excellence Award. It was the fifth straight year OLBH had received the highest-possible HealthGrades rating for treatment of pneumonia. OLBH's HealthGrades rankings were best in the Huntington, West Virginia/Ashland, Kentucky area for pulmonary care and the hospital ranked among the top ten percent of hospitals nationwide in pulmonary care for six consecutive years. OLBH has received five-star distinction for treatment of pneumonia for eight straight years.

In 2009, OLBH received a five-star rating for treatment of heart attack for the third straight year. Additionally, the hospital received these top quality ratings for treatment of respiratory failure and sepsis, a critical bloodstream infection. Five-star distinction also was granted OLBH in gastrointestinal surgery and procedures. OLBH is ranked in the top five in the state of Kentucky for both gastrointestinal surgery and services.

OLBH received HealthGrades' Outstanding Patient Experience Award in the first year it was awarded in 2009 and received it again for six straight years. The distinction indicates a hospital is among the nation's top 15 percent in patient experience. To identify the top-performing hospitals, HealthGrades analyzed survey results for hospitals nationwide that participated in a federal initiative by the U.S. Department of Health and Human Services' Centers for Medicare and Medicaid Services. For four of those years (from 2010 to 2013), OLBH ranked among the top five percent in the nation for patient experience based on an analysis of patient surveys from 3,775 hospitals.

In 2015, the Kentucky Chamber of Commerce and the Kentucky Society for Human Resource Management (KYSHRM) named OLBH among the 100 companies on its annual Best Places to Work in Kentucky list. OLBH would receive the distinction for the next three years.

In 2018, Bon Secours Health System and Mercy Health announced that the two ministries had formed Bon Secours Mercy Health, creating one of the largest health care systems in the country.

=== Closure ===
On January 21, 2020, Bon Secours Mercy Health announced that Our Lady of Bellefonte Hospital and Bellefonte Physician Services would be closing in September 2020.

On February 20, 2020, Bon Secours Mercy pushed up the closing date to April 30, 2020, due to lack of staffing. The inpatient hospital facility and emergency department officially closed on April 30, 2020, with all OLBH services ending on or before the original September 30 closing date. Many of OLBH's facilities were absorbed by King's Daughters Medical Center (KDMC) (now UK King's Daughters) in Ashland and Southern Ohio Medical Center (SOMC) in Portsmouth, Ohio. In addition, most of OLBH's medical providers as well as a large number of staff members were hired by KDMC, SOMC, Mountain Health Network's Cabell Huntington Hospital and St. Mary's Medical Center in Huntington, West Virginia, as well as other medical facilities in the area.

On April 16, 2020, Bon Secours Mercy Health announced they had agreed to allow KDMC to use the hospital facility and equipment as a surge facility if needed during the COVID-19 pandemic after the April 30 closing date. In addition, it was announced that the Vitality Center would reopen on June 1, 2020, under KDMC ownership and management.

In December 2020, Bon Secours Mercy announced that they would donate the Bellefonte Pavilion building to the Greenup County Fiscal Court, who immediately declared the facility to be surplus county property and began accepting bids for potential purchase. On January 25, 2021, the fiscal court agreed to sell the building and adjacent property to King's Daughters Medical Center for $3 million.

Addiction Recovery Care (ARC) of Louisa, Kentucky announced in April 2021 that they were considering purchasing the main hospital building and other former OLBH property to develop a residential treatment facility for individuals dealing with substance abuse disorders, as well as reopening the psychiatric and detox units previously operated by OLBH. ARC stated that the proposed facility would be similar to their Crown Recovery Center men's facility at the former St. Catharine College in Springfield, although the Russell facility would house both men and women. After discussions with city of Russell, Greenup County and Kentucky state officials as well as area residents, ARC signed a letter of intent to purchase the property in December 2021. On March 11, 2022, ARC and Bon Secours Mercy Health announced that a purchase agreement for the OLBH property had been finalized. The psychiatric and recovery facility officially reopened in the former OLBH behavioral health building under Addiction Recovery Center ownership and management in November 2023 while renovations on the former main hospital building remain ongoing.
