= Saint Joseph Hospital (Lexington, Kentucky) =

- CommonSpirit Health

Geography
- Location: 1 Saint Joseph Drive, Lexington, Kentucky, United States
- Coordinates: 38.0324°N 84.5236°W

Services
- Emergency department: Level 2 Trauma Chest Pain Center
- Beds: 468

History
- Founded: 1877

Links
- Website: www.commonspirit.org/find-a-location/commonspirit-saint-joseph-hospital-lexington-2603
- Lists: Hospitals in Kentucky

Saint Joseph Hospital is 468-bed medical center located two miles southwest of downtown Lexington, Kentucky, United States. Founded in 1877, it is Lexington's oldest still existing hospitals. It is part of CommonSpirit Health.

== History ==
Saint Joseph Hospital was founded on October 2, 1877, by the Sisters of Charity of Nazareth, a Bardstown, Kentucky-based group who managed schools and orphanages around the state, as well as the St Joseph Infirmary hospital in Louisville. The Lexington branch of the St Joseph Infirmary was started in October 1877 by Sister Euphrasia Stafford.

In 1998 Saint Joseph acquired Jewish Hospital Lexington, which was renamed Saint Joseph East.
