= Mercy Health (Ohio and Kentucky) =

Catholic healthcare organization based in Cincinnati, Ohio, United States

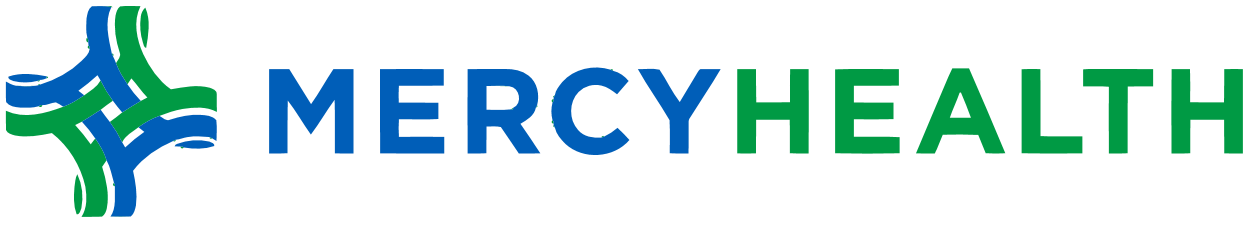
- Type: Non-profit
- Industry: Health care
- Headquarters: Cincinnati, Ohio, United States
- Parent: Bon Secours Mercy Health
- Website: mercy.com

Mercy Health, formerly Catholic Health Partners, is a Catholic health care system with locations in Ohio and Kentucky. Cincinnati-based Mercy Health operates more than 250 healthcare organizations in Ohio and Kentucky. Mercy Health is the second-largest health system in Ohio and the state's fourth-largest employer.

On September 1, 2018, Mercy Health and Bon Secours Health System USA combined to become Bon Secours Mercy Health. Bon Secours Mercy Health headquarters are co-located with Mercy Health in Cincinnati, Ohio.

== History ==
The Religious Sisters of Mercy (R.S.M.) were founded in 1831 in Dublin, Ireland, by Catherine McAuley. The sisters arrived in the United States in 1843. Eventually thirty-nine separate Sisters of Mercy congregations across the United States and Latin America developed from that first convent in Pittsburgh. The Sisters of Mercy established hospitals in Hamilton, Ohio in 1892 and in Wilkes-Barre, Pennsylvania, in 1898.

=== The Sisters of Charity of Montreal ===
In 1855 Toledo, Ohio was in the midst of a cholera and malaria epidemic. Father Augustine Campion, pastor of St. Francis de Sales Church, asked the Sisters of Charity of Montreal for assistance. They established St. Vincent Hospital. In 1983 the Sisters of Charity of Montreal established Covenant Health Systems to direct, support and conduct their health care, elder care and social service systems throughout the United States. St. Vincent's Medical Center in Toledo joined Catholic Health Partners, while Covenant Health Systems retained management of the facilities in New England.

=== Sisters of the Holy Humility of Mary ===
The sisters entered health care in 1879 when St. Joseph's Infirmary was built, the first Catholic hospital in the Mahoning Valley, which functioned until 1910 when the sisters were given charge of St. Elizabeth Hospital in Youngstown, Ohio. Two more Ohio hospitals came under the direction of the sisters - St. Joseph Health Center in Warren in 1924 and St. Elizabeth in Boardman. By 2011, Humility of Mary Health Partners was formed to oversee the administration and management of St. Elizabeth Hospital and St. Joseph Health Center and several other area health-care services. By 2014, the hospitals were run by Catholic Health Partners.

=== Name changes ===
Incorporated in 1986 as Mercy Health Care Systems, in 1997 the name was changed to Catholic Healthcare Partners to reflect the multiple religious communities that sponsored it. It was later shortened to Catholic Health Partners to reflect its growing emphasis on preventative care and overall wellness. It became Mercy Health in 2014. On September 1, 2018, Bon Secours Health System and Mercy Health merged. The merger created one of the largest Catholic healthcare systems in the United States.

== Sponsors ==
These Catholic organizations co-sponsor Mercy Health: the Sisters of Mercy, South Central Community; the Sisters of Mercy, Mid-Atlantic Community; the Sisters of Humility of Mary; and the Sisters of Charity of Montreal.

== Hospitals ==
Mercy Health serves seven markets: Cincinnati, Toledo, Youngstown, Lima, Lorain and Springfield in Ohio and Paducah and Irvine in Kentucky.

=== Cincinnati, Ohio ===
In the Cincinnati area, there are six hospitals:

- Mercy Health Anderson Hospital
- Mercy Health Kings Mills Hospital
- Mercy Health Clermont Hospital
- Mercy Health Fairfield Hospital
- Mercy Health West Hospital
- The Jewish Hospital – Mercy Health

Mercy Health also operates four 24-hour standalone emergency rooms, with locations in Rookwood (opened in 2013), Mount Orab (opened in 2009), Harrison, and on Queen City Avenue in Cincinnati's Western Hills. The Mount Orab location was expanded in 2015, doubling in total size.

=== Lima, Ohio ===
One hospital in Allen County:

- Mercy Health St. Rita's Medical Center

One additional 24-hour standalone emergency room:

- Mercy Health Putnam County Emergency Services

=== Lorain County, Ohio ===
- Mercy Health Allen Hospital
- Mercy Health Lorain Hospital

=== Springfield, Ohio ===
- Mercy Health Urbana Hospital
- Mercy Health Springfield Regional Medical Center

One additional 24-hour standalone emergency room:

- Mercy Health — Dayton Springfield Emergency Center

=== Toledo, Ohio ===
Seven hospitals in Toledo and the Northwest Ohio area:

- Mercy Health Defiance Hospital
- Mercy Health Perrysburg Hospital
- Mercy Health St. Anne Hospital
- Mercy Health St. Charles Hospital
- Mercy Health St. Vincent Medical Center
- Mercy Health Tiffin Hospital
- Mercy Health Willard Hospital

And one additional 24-hour standalone emergency room:

- Mercy Health Sylvania Medical Center

=== Youngstown, Ohio ===
Three hospitals in the Mahoning Valley area:

- Mercy Health St. Elizabeth Boardman Hospital
- Mercy Health St. Elizabeth Youngstown Hospital
- Mercy Health St. Joseph Warren Hospital

One additional 24-hour standalone emergency room:

- Mercy Health — Austintown Medical Center: Opened in 2004; located west of Youngstown, Ohio; clinical laboratory and imaging on site; sees about 100 patients a day; has an ambulance bay and helipad.

=== Irvine, Kentucky ===
- Mercy Health Marcum and Wallace Hospital

=== Paducah, Kentucky ===
- Mercy Health Lourdes Hospital

== See also ==
- Bon Secours (Virginia & South Carolina)
- Bon Secours Charity Health System
- Bon Secours Sisters
- Bon Secours Mercy Health
