= Bon Secours Hospital =

Bon Secours Hospital may refer to:

- Bon Secours Hospital, Cork, a private hospital in County Cork, Ireland
- Bon Secours Hospital, Dublin, a private hospital in Glasnevin, Dublin, Ireland
- Bon Secours Hospital, Galway, a private hospital in County Galway, Ireland
- Bon Secours Hospital, Tralee, a private hospital in County Kerry, Ireland
- Grace Medical Center (Baltimore), known as Bon Secours until December 2019
- Holy Family Hospital (Methuen), Massachusetts, formerly Bon Secours Hospital, now part of Steward Health Care System

== See also ==
- Bon Secours Health System (USA)
