= Renmore =

Eastern suburb of Galway City, Ireland

Coordinates: 53.277°N 9.023°W

Renmore An Rinn Mhór
- Suburb
- Renmore in 1998

- Location in Ireland
- Country: Ireland
- Province: Connacht
- County: County Galway
- Local government area: Galway City Council
- Time zone: UTC+0 (WET)
  - Summer (DST): UTC+1 (IST (WEST))

Renmore (Irish: An Rinn Mhór, meaning 'big point (or headland)') is a suburb of Galway, Ireland, around 2 km east of the city centre. Renmore runs east along the coast and south of the Old Dublin Road (R338), from the shore of Lough Atalia on its west side to Lurgan Park on its east. The area, which includes Ballyloughane beach, is home to approximately 5,000 people.

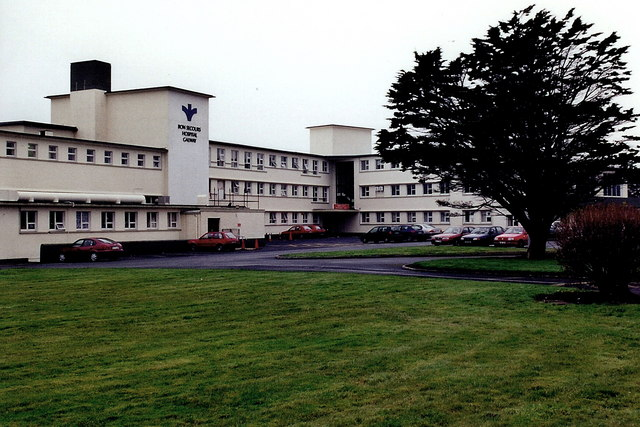
Bon Secours Hospital, Galway in the early 21st century

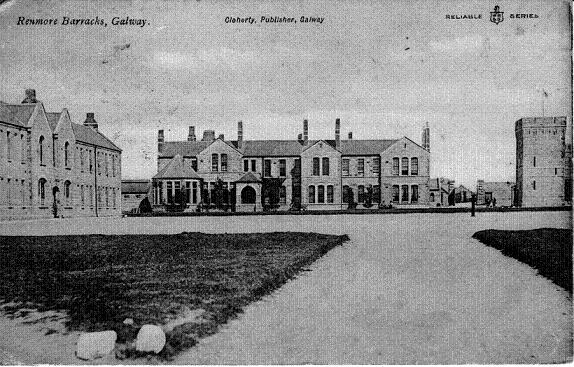
Renmore Barracks in the early 20th century

== Amenities ==
Lough Atalia lies between Renmore and the city, which can be crossed using the public path beside the railway line (colloquially known as 'The Line'). St Oliver Plunkett Church is located beside the local national (primary) school. The primary school in Renmore is known as Scoil Chaitriona, and there is also an all-Irish gaelscoil named Gaelscoil Dara. The Galway campus of Atlantic Technological University is one of the larger employers in the area.

Renmore is also home to Dún Uí Mhaoilíosa (meaning "Mellow's Fort" and named for Liam Mellows), a base of the Irish Army's Southern Brigade. The barracks, also officially and commonly known as "Renmore Barracks" in English, was the base of the Connaught Rangers under British rule. The barracks are now the base of the 1st Infantry Battalion and are located at the end of Renmore Road. The Department of Defence also has offices in the area.

A private hospital, the Bon Secours Hospital, Galway which is operated by the Bon Secours Health System, is located in Renmore.

== Events ==
The Renmore Panto is an annual pantomime which began in 1979 and the first performance was on the stage in the Jes Hall. The panto has been hosted by a variety of venues including Leisureland and the Town Hall Theatre.

== See also ==
- List of towns and villages in Ireland
