= James Rupert Boyd Barrett =

English architect (1904–1976)

- Born: 1904; Loughborough, Leicestershire
- Died: 1 November 1976 (aged 71–72); Cork, Ireland
- Family: Basil Raymond Boyd Barrett(brother)

James Rupert Boyd Barrett (1904–1 November 1976) was an English architect known for designing various churches and schools in the Republic of Ireland.

== Early life ==
Barrett was born in Loughborough, Leicestershire to Charles Boyd Barrett, an electrical engineer and Mary Jacqueline Boyd Barrett. His grandfather John Loftus Robinson and his uncle John Joseph Robinson were renowned architects. He attended Clongowes Wood College in County Kildare and O'Connell School in Dublin. He became an apprentice architect with Jones & Kelly while attending the National College of Art and Design and University College London. He won the Architectural Association of Ireland's institute prize in 1925. In 1926 he became a member of the Royal Institute of the Architects of Ireland and in 1928 he became a member of the Royal Institute of British Architects.

== Career ==
Barrett came to promise in the mid 1920s after he was chosen by Barry Byrne, student of legendary architect Frank Lloyd Wright to overlook the construction of Christ the King Church in Turners Cross, Cork to help meet the needs of a growing population. In total he designed ten churches in County Kerry and four in County Cork. His first big solo project came in 1935 when he beat out 35 other architects for the right to design the Department of Industry and Commerce building on Kildare Street, Dublin. His design was chosen for having the largest possible amount of office accommodation on the site.

== Later life ==
In 1963, he was awarded the Order of St. Sylvester by Pope John XXIII and presented with the scroll of honour by Cornelius Lucey, bishop of Cork, earning the title of chevalier. He died 1 November 1976 at the Bon Secours Hospital, Cork and was buried in St. Finbarr's Cemetery. At the time of his death he was living in Monkstown, County Cork. He was married to Mary O'Callaghan from 1928 until his death. They had no children.

== Other works ==
- St. Loman's Hospital, Mullingar, County Westmeath (1930s expansion, original building designed by John Skipton Mulvany)
- Auxiliary Psychiatric Hospital, Castlerea, County Roscommon (now Castlerea Prison)
- Roscommon University Hospital
- Bon Secours Hospital, Dublin
- St. Michael's Catholic Church, Blackrock, Cork
- Scoil an Spioraid Naoimh Primary School, Bishopstown, Cork
- Chapel of St. Peter at the Temple Gate, Knocknaheeny, Cork
- Kane Building, Electrical Engineering Building and Main Restaurant building, University College Cork
