= Walter P Moore =

International engineering firm

- Type: Private
- Industry: Engineering, consulting
- Founded: 1931; 95 years ago in Houston, Texas, US
- Founder: Walter P. Moore, Sr.
- Headquarters: Houston, Texas, US
- Number of locations: 36 offices in 6 countries (2025)
- Area served: Worldwide
- Key people: Dilip Choudhuri (CEO); David Landis (Chairman)
- Number of employees: 1,000+
- Website: www.walterpmoore.com

Walter P. Moore and Associates, Inc. (d/b/a Walter P Moore) is an international engineering firm founded in 1931 in Houston, Texas. The firm gained global recognition in the mid-20th century for its role as structural engineer of the Astrodome, the first fully enclosed, air-conditioned domed sports stadium.

== History ==
The company was founded in 1931 by Walter P Moore, Sr. as a solo structural engineering firm in Houston, TX. His earliest projects involved designing foundations for residential estates in Houston's River Oaks district.

Moore remained the sole owner of the firm until 1967 when it incorporated with him as president and his son, Walter P Moore Jr., as principal. At the time the company employed over 100 people in offices across Houston, San Antonio, and Dallas.

By the late 1970's the firm had been involved in over 15,000 projects across Texas including work for Rice University, Jones Hall, Miller Outdoor Theater, and 50 major building in the Texas Medical Center including MD Anderson Cancer Center, Texas Children's Hospital, Baylor College of Medicine, and Ben Taub Hospital.

Moore Sr. remained involved in the company until his passing in 1983. At that time the firm reported active projects across 20 states. Moore Jr. retired from the company in 1993.

By 2013, the firm had offices in Atlanta, Austin, Dallas, El Paso, Kansas City, Las Vegas, Los Angeles, Orlando, San Francisco, Tampa, Tulsa, and Washington DC.

Dilip Choudhuri was named CEO in 2015. Total global revenue in 2016 was reported to be near $100 million. By 2025, WPM ranked #2 in the U.S. for sport and recreation facility engineering based on a reported sports facility revenue of $45 million in 2024.

The firm reportedly passed $225 million in global design revenue in 2025, ranking 134th globally in ENR’s Top 500 Design Firms which notes projects across North America, Columbia, Costa Rica, Ecuador, Guatemala, Guyana, Mexico, Panama, Peru, Denmark, France, Saudi Arabia, United Arab Emirates, India, South Korea, Thailand, Vietnam, Congo Republic, South Africa, and the arctic regions.

== Notable Projects ==
Name	Location	Tentants/Owners	Category	Role
Allianz Field	St. Paul, MN	Minnesota United FC	Stadium/Entertainment	Facade consultant
Astrodome	Houston, TX	Houston Oilers; Houston Astros; Harris County	Stadium/Entertainment	Structural engineer
AT&T Stadium	Arlington, TX	Dallas Cowboys	Stadium/Entertainment	Structural engineer
Bagby Street Reconstruction	Houston, TX	Houston Midtown Redevelopment Authority	Urban Infrastructure	Engineer of record
Bank of America Corporate Center	Charlotte, NC	Bank of America	Corporate	Structural engineer
Children's Hospital of Richmond at VCU	Richmond, VA	Virginia Commonwealth University	Healthcare	Structural engineer
Chase Center	San Francisco, CA	Golden State Warriors	Stadium/Entertainment	Facade consultant
Daytona International Speedway	Daytona, FL	NASCAR	Stadium/Entertainment	Engineer of record (DAYTONA Rising grandstand renovation)
Empower Field at Mile High	Denver, CO	Denver Broncos	Stadium/Entertainment	Structural engineer
Fiserv Forum	Milwaukee, WI	Milwaukee Bucks	Stadium/Entertainment	Structural engineer
Ford Center at The Star	Frisco, TX	Dallas Cowboys, Frisco Independent School District	Stadium/Entertainment	Structural engineer
Geodis Park	Nashville, TN	Nashville SC	Stadium/Entertainment	Structural engineer
Globe Life Field	Arlington, TX	Texas Rangers	Stadium/Entertainment	Engineer of record
Hall of State	Dallas, TX	Dallas Historical Society	Civic/Cultural	Structural engineer (historic restoration)
Hartsfield–Jackson Atlanta International Airport	Atlanta, GA	Atlanta Department of Aviation	Transportation Infrastructure	Structural engineer (consolidated rental facility)
Intuit Dome	Los Angeles, CA	Los Angeles Clippers	Stadium/Entertainment	Structural engineer
Kyle Field	College Station, TX	Texas A&M Aggies	Stadium/Entertainment	Engineer of record
Louis Armstrong New Orleans International Airport	New Orleans, LA	New Orleans Aviation Board	Transportation Infrastructure	Structural engineer (international terminal)
LoanDepot Park	Miami, FL	Miami Marlins	Stadium/Entertainment	Structural engineer
Lucas Oil Stadium	Indianapolis, IN	Indianapolis Colts	Stadium/Entertainment	Structural engineer
George Thomas Mickey Leland Federal Building	Houston, TX	U.S. General Services Administration	Civic/Cultural	Structural engineer, Civil engineer (2014 modernization)
Midtown Park	Houston, TX	Houston Midtown Redevelopment Authority	Civic/Cultural	Engineering design
Narendra Modi Stadium	Ahmedabad, Gujarat, India	Gujarat Cricket Association	Stadium/Entertainment	Structural engineer
National Center for Civil and Human Rights	Atlanta, GA	National Center for Civil and Human Rights	Civic/Cultural	Structural engineer
NRG Stadium	Houston, TX	Houston Livestock Show and Rodeo, Houston Texans	Stadium/Entertainment	Structural engineer
Raymond James Stadium	Tampa, FL	Tampa Bay Buccaneers	Stadium/Entertainment	Partner
Salvador Dalí Museum	St. Petersburg, FL	Salvador Dalí Museum, Inc	Civic/Cultural	Structural engineer
San Antonio Military Medical Center	San Antonio, TX	United States Army Corps of Engineers	Healthcare	Structural engineer
San Francisco International Airport	San Francisco, CA	San Francisco International Airport	Transportation Infrastructure	Structural engineer (air traffic control tower)
San Jacinto College	Pasadena, TX	San Jacinto College	Education	Structural engineer (Anderson-Ball Classroom Building)
SoFi Stadium	Inglewood, CA	Los Angeles Rams; Los Angeles Chargers	Stadium/Entertainment	Structural engineer
Shell Energy Stadium	Houston, TX	Houston Dynamo	Stadium/Entertainment	Structural engineer
City Place	Spring, TX	Springwoods Village	Urban Infrastructure	Civil engineer, Structural engineer
State Farm Stadium	Glendale, AZ	Arizona Cardinals	Stadium/Entertainment	Partner
Target Field	Minneapolis, MN	Minnesota Twins	Stadium/Entertainment	Structural engineer
TMC3	Houston, TX	Texas Medical Center	Urban Infrastructure	Construction engineer
Tropicana Field	Tampa, FL	Tampa Bay Rays	Stadium/Entertainment	Structural engineer (proposed redevelopment)
Truist Park	Atlanta, GA	Atlanta Braves	Stadium/Entertainment	Engineer of Record
United States Land Port of Entry	Columbus, NM	U.S. General Services Administration	Transportation Infrastructure	Structural engineer
Walmart Home Office	Bentonville, AR	Walmart	Master Planned	Civil engineer, Traffic engineer
