= James Murray (VC) =

Recipient of the Victoria Cross

James Murray VC
- Born: February 1859; Cork City, Ireland
- Died: 19 July 1942 (aged 83); Dublin, Ireland
- Military career
- Allegiance: United Kingdom
- Branch: British Army
- Rank: Lance-Corporal
- Units: Connaught Rangers
- Conflicts: First Boer War
- Awards: Victoria Cross

James Murray VC (February 1859 – 19 July 1942) was an Irish recipient of the Victoria Cross, the highest and most prestigious award for gallantry in the face of the enemy that can be awarded to British and Commonwealth forces.

Murray was born in St Michael's Parish, Cork City, Ireland. He was approximately 21 years old, and a Lance-Corporal in the 2nd Battalion, The Connaught Rangers, British Army during the First Boer War when the following deed took place for which he was awarded the VC. On 16 January 1881 at Elandsfontein, near Pretoria, South Africa, Lance-Corporal Murray and John Danaher, a trooper of Nourse's Horse, advanced for 500 yards under heavy fire from a party of about 60 of the enemy and brought out of action a private who had been severely wounded.

He died in Dublin on 19 July 1942. His Victoria Cross is displayed at the National Army Museum, Chelsea, England.
