= Castlerea Prison =

Prison in County Roscommon, Ireland

- Entrance sign

- Location within Ireland
- Location: Harristown, Castlerea, County Roscommon, Ireland; 53°45′17″N 8°29′20″W
- Status: Operational
- Security class: Medium security
- Capacity: 340
- Population: 320 (2022)
- Opened: 1996
- Managed by: Irish Prison Service
- Governor: David Conroy

Castlerea Prison (Irish: Príosún an Chaisleáin Riabhach) is a closed category, medium-security prison in Castlerea, County Roscommon, Ireland. It houses men over 17 years of age. As of 2022, it had a bed capacity of 340 and the daily average number of resident inmates was 320.

== History ==
Castlerea was established as part of the system of district mental hospitals in 1939, and designed by James Rupert Boyd Barrett.

It was renamed St. Patrick's Hospital during the 1960s. Operating intermittently as a tuberculosis sanitorium, it continued to function as a hospital until 1994 when it was closed.

From 1996 it opened as a prison, accepting a small intake of inmates that year. Construction work on the main cell blocks of the prison was completed in 1998.

== See also ==
- Prisons in Ireland
