= Children's Hospital of Richmond at VCU =

Children's hospital in Richmond, Virginia, U.S.

- VCU Health

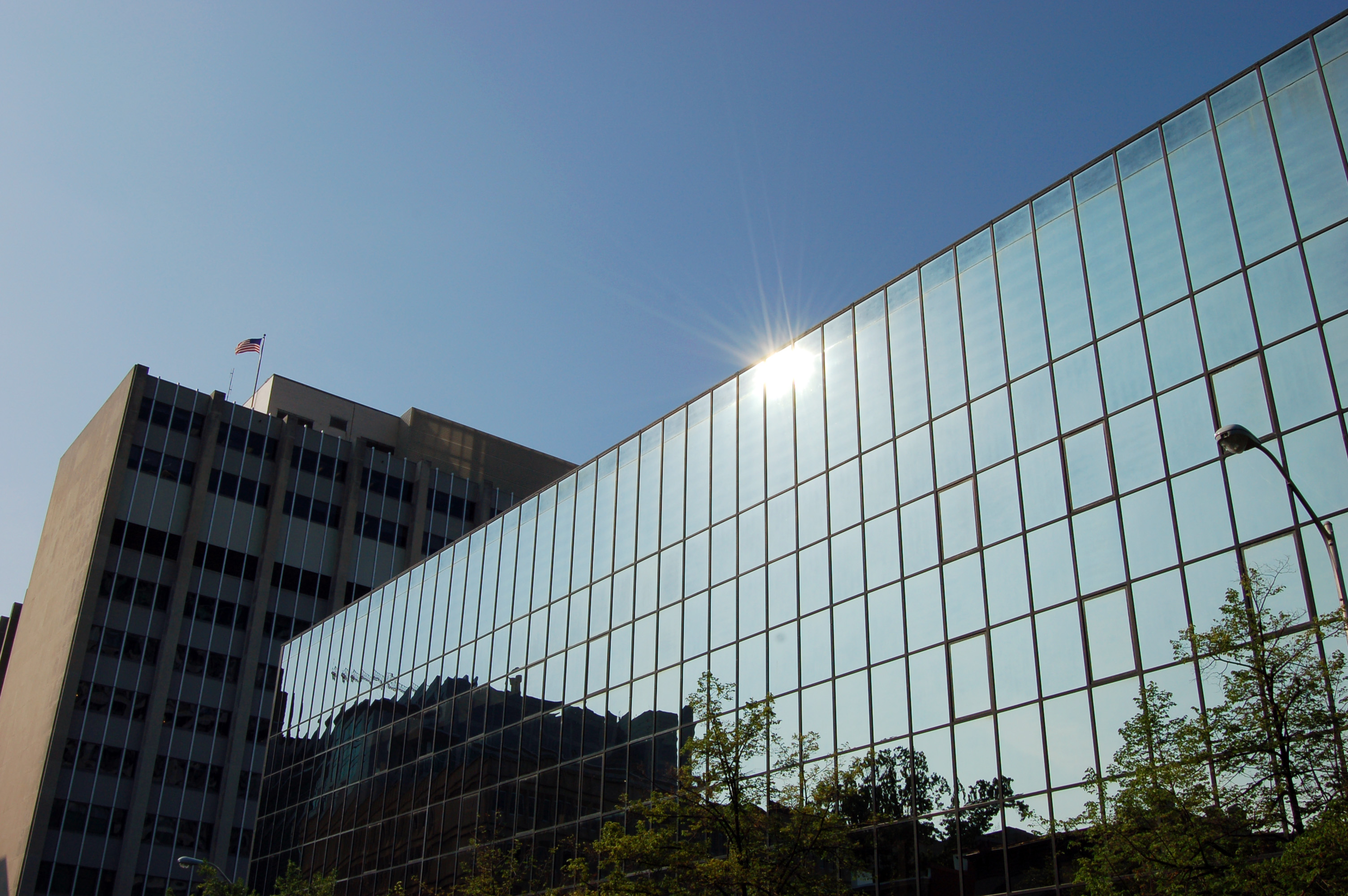
- Children's Hospital Pavilion in 2007

Geography
- Location: Richmond, Virginia, United States
- Coordinates: 37.540464°N 77.432053°W

Organization
- Type: Children's Hospital
- Affiliated university: VCU School of Medicine

Services
- Emergency department: Level 1 Pediatric Trauma Center
- Beds: 144

History
- Former names: Crippled Children's Hospital; Children's Hospital; Children’s Medical Center at MCV
- Constructed: New hospital: 2019
- Opened: Original: 1920

Links
- Website: www.chrichmond.org
- Lists: Hospitals in the United States

Children's Hospital of Richmond at VCU (CHoR) is a nationally ranked pediatric acute care children's hospital located within VCU Medical Center in Richmond, Virginia, United States. The hospital has 144 pediatric beds. It is affiliated with The Virginia Commonwealth University School of Medicine, and is a member of VCU Health. The hospital provides comprehensive pediatric specialties and subspecialties to infants, children, teens, and young adults aged 0–17 throughout eastern Virginia. CHOR also has a helipad to transport critically ill pediatric patients. Children's Hospital of Richmond features the only pediatric Level 1 Trauma Center in the region and the state.

The hospital is rated as the second best children's hospital in Virginia on the 2020-21 U.S. News & World Report.

== History ==
Origins of the hospital date back to 1920 when the original Crippled Children's Hospital was incorporated as a hospital to provide pediatric orthopedic services.

In 1928 Crippled Children's Hospital opened a campus on Brook Road that still operates as the Children's Hospital of Richmond Brook Road campus.

Pediatric services at VCU have historically been based in the adult hospital, on dedicated pediatric units known as a "hospital within a hospital," under the name Children's Medical Center at MCV. In 1973, VCU doctor, Dr. Barry Kirkpatrick established the first neonatal intensive care unit (NICU) in Richmond at Children's Medical Center at MCV, which was the first one in Virginia.

In 1980, Crippled Children's Hospital changed their name to Children's Hospital to better reflect the variety of services offered.

On June 30, 2010, Children's Hospital and Children's Medical Center at MCV merged to become a full-service hospital under the new name Children's Hospital of Richmond at VCU.

On November 7, 2011, doctors from Children's Hospital of Richmond performed a 20-hour-long surgery to separate conjoined twins, Maria and Teresa Tapia. The twins were separated successfully and returned to CHoR a year later for a follow-up appointment.

In 2012, VCU broke ground on a new $168 million, 640,000-square-foot outpatient children's pavilion. The plans called for 72 exam rooms, two operating rooms, and areas for testing and imaging. In addition, plans called for an attached underground parking garage. The architect was HKS and construction was handled by Swedish firm Skanska. The new facility opened on March 21, 2016.

In 2013 VCU Health entered into an agreement with Bon Secours Health to form the Virginia Children's Hospital Alliance. The goal of the alliance was to build a $1 billion independent, freestanding children's hospital in the Richmond area. Later that year, In 2015, both VCU and Bon Secours both dropped out of the alliance due to the disapproval of the agreement forcing each system to migrate their pediatric services to the new freestanding system.

In February 2019, VCU officials announced plans to build an 86-bed, $350 million children's hospital adjacent to its outpatient children's pavilion in downtown Richmond. The new building, the Children's Tower, replaced the existing inpatient pediatric units across the street at VCU's adult hospital. The new hospital also contains shell-space for future growth and opened in 2023. In May 2025, the hospital announced plans to add 20 new NICU beds to complement the 40 existing beds at the nearby VCU Medical Center Critical Care Hospital and is planned to open in January 2026.

In March 2020, the hospital implemented strict visitor limitations to help stop the spread of the 2020 COVID-19 pandemic. Restrictions allowed for patients on pediatric units to be limited to two visitors and emergency room visits limited to one parent.

== Awards ==
Along with VCU Medical Center, the hospital was designated as a magnet hospital by the American Nurse Credentialing Center in 2011, 2016, and 2020.

In 2020-21 the hospital was ranked as the #2 best children's hospital in Virginia (behind UVA Children's Hospital) by U.S. News & World Report.

U.S. News & World Report Rankings for Children's Hospital of Richmond at VCU
Specialty	Rank (In the U.S.)	Score (Out of 100)
Pediatric Cancer	#49	69.7
Pediatric Nephrology	#43	66.3
Pediatric Pulmonology & Lung Surgery	#29	74.7
Pediatric Urology	#29	60.8

== See also ==
- VCU Medical Center
- UVA Children's Hospital
- Bon Secours Health
- VCU School of Medicine
