= Maria and Teresa Tapia =

Formerly conjoined twins from the Dominican Republic

- Born: April 8, 2010 (age 16); Dominican Republic
- Known for: Conjoined twins (April 8, 2010–November 7, 2011)

Maria and Teresa Tapia (born April 8, 2010) are formerly conjoined twins born in the Dominican Republic. The twins were joined by their lower chest and abdomen and were therefore classified as omphalopagus, sharing a liver, pancreas, and a small portion of their small intestine. On November 7, 2011, the twins underwent successful separation surgery at the Children's Hospital of Richmond in Virginia.

Separation surgery was critical to these twins, as 88 percent of the blood flow from the liver was transmitted to Teresa leaving Maria approximately 20 percent smaller due to a lack of nutrients. The Dominican Republic does not have access to the medical tools needed to separate the twins. Upon learning about the twins, the World Pediatric Project stepped in and helped. The World Pediatric Project is a non-profit organization that heals critically ill children in developing nations that may not have access to quality health care tools or procedures.

A team of 45 surgeons took approximately 20-hours to perform the separation surgery. The process started on November 7, 2011, at 6 am. This was the first time that a surgery of the type was performed at the Children's Hospital of Richmond. The surgical team divided the pancreas, the liver, as well the organ systems that the twin girls shared. Lastly, the surgical team rebuilt the abdominal walls of the twins.

The girls underwent a six-week period of physical therapy and recovery. Maria and Teresa are now able to walk independently, were able to return to the Dominican Republic and often return to the United States for follow-up care.
