= Renmore Barracks =

Military installation in Galway, Ireland

- Dún Uí Mhaoilíosa
- Renmore, Galway
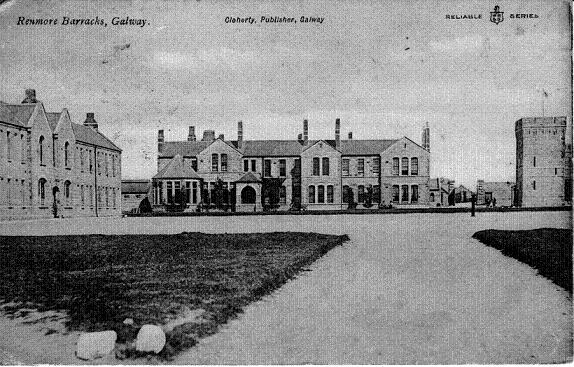
- Renmore Barracks

Site information
- Type: Barracks
- Operator: (Republic of Ireland) Irish Army

Location
- Location within Ireland
- Coordinates: 53.27284°N 9.03191°W

Site history
- Built: 1889
- Built for: War Office
- In use: 1889-Present

Garrison information
- Occupants: 1st Infantry Battalion, Irish Army

Renmore Barracks (Irish: Dún Uí Mhaoilíosa) is a military installation in Renmore, a suburb of Galway, Ireland. Officially known as Dún Uí Mhaoilíosa, the barracks are home to the 1st Infantry Battalion of the Irish Army.

== History ==
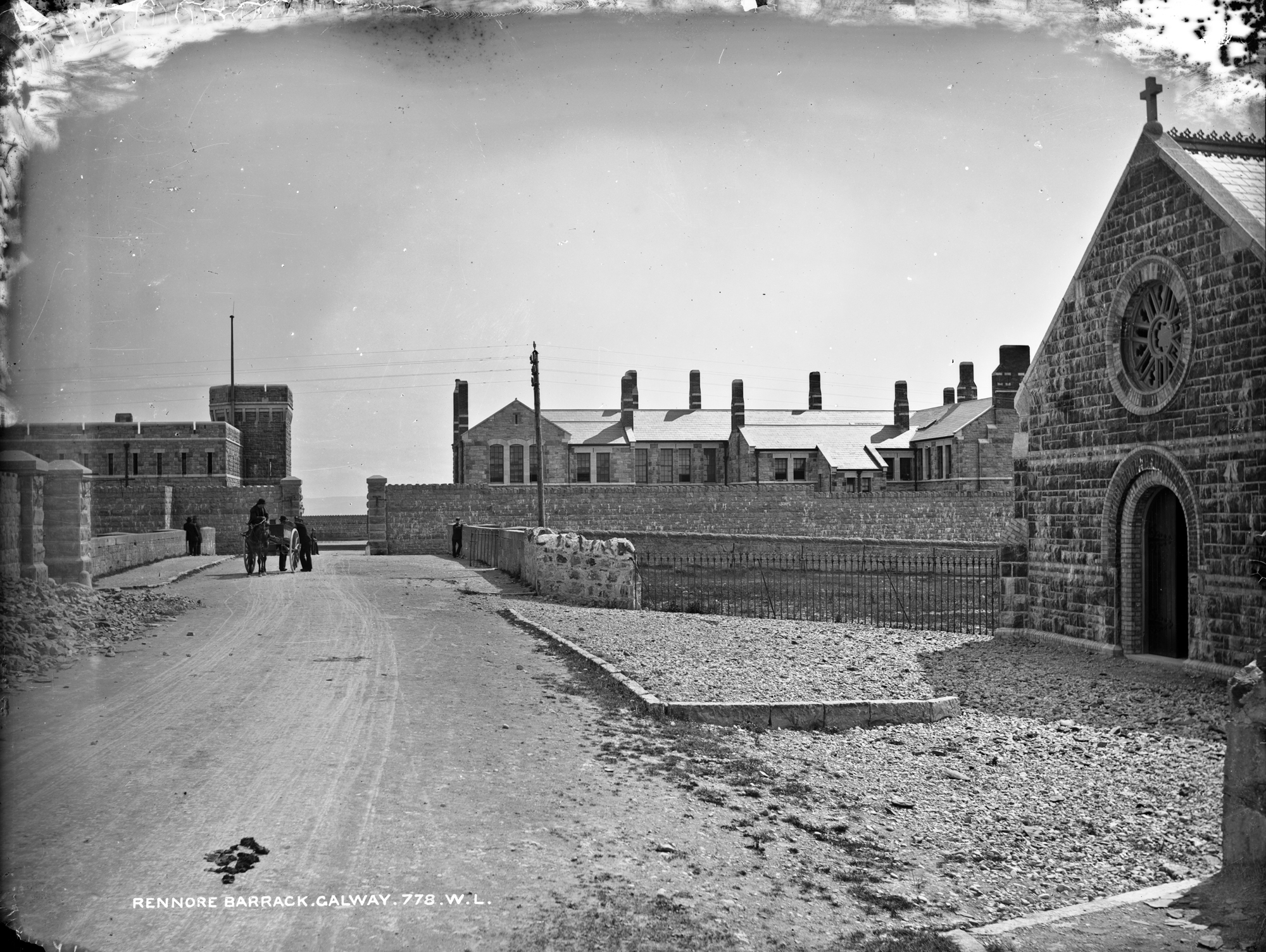
The Barracks between 1880-1914

The barracks were built by Colleran Brothers, a Dublin-based contractor, and completed in 1881. Their creation took place as part of the Cardwell Reforms which encouraged the localisation of British military forces. The barracks became the depot for the 87th (Royal Irish Fusiliers) Regiment of Foot and the 88th Regiment of Foot (Connaught Rangers). Following the Childers Reforms, the 88th Regiment of Foot (Connaught Rangers) and 94th Regiment of Foot amalgamated to form the Connaught Rangers with its depot in the barracks in 1881.

The Connaught Rangers were disbanded at the time of Irish Independence in 1922. The barracks were taken over by the Irish Army at that time and then renamed Dún Uí Mhaoilíosa after Liam Mellows, an Irish Republican, in 1952. The barracks are now home to the 1st Infantry Battalion.

In August 2024, army chaplain Paul Murphy was stabbed outside the entrance to the barracks. A teenage boy was arrested at the scene. As of 16 August 2024, the Special Detective Unit was investigating the incident. In February 2025, the boy pleaded guilty to attempted murder.

== Dún Uí Mhaoilíosa Museum ==
Renmore Barracks features a museum that recalls the history of the Connaught Rangers, as well as Renmore Barracks' later role as home to the 1st Infantry Battalion of the Irish Army. Irish soldiers engaging in UN Peacekeeping in Congo, Cyprus, Lebanon, Chad and Afghanistan are remembered at the Dún Uí Mhaoilíosa Museum. An axe used by an African tribesman in the Niemba Ambush in the Congo in which nine Irish Army soldiers were killed is featured in the exhibits.

The museum has forged links with the Connaught Rangers Association, established in Boyle in 2002.

Dún Uí Mhaoilíosa Museum is not fully open to the public, but visitors can make an appointment to visit by contacting the museum curator.

== See also ==
- List of Irish military installations
