= John Danaher (VC) =

Recipient of the Victoria Cross

John Danaher VC
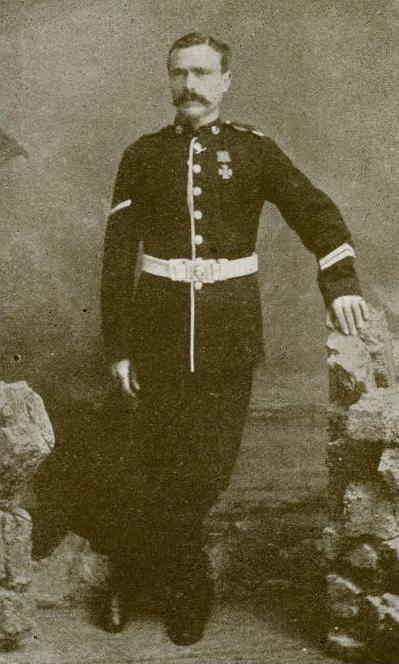
- Born: 25 June 1860; Limerick
- Died: 9 January 1919 (aged 58); Portsmouth, England
- Burial place: Milton Cemetery, Portsmouth, England
- Military career
- Allegiance: United Kingdom
- Branch: South African Forces; British Army
- Service years: 1880 - 1908
- Rank: Sergeant
- Units: Nourse's Horse (Transvaal), South African Forces; 2nd Battalion, Connaught Rangers
- Conflicts: First Boer War
- Awards: Victoria Cross

John Danaher VC also known as John Danagher (25 June 1860 – 9 January 1919) was an Irish recipient of the Victoria Cross, the highest and most prestigious award for gallantry in the face of the enemy that can be awarded to British and Commonwealth forces.

== Early life ==
Born in Limerick, Ireland, Danaher moved to South Africa shortly after the completion of his schooling. Upon the outbreak of the First Boer War, Danaher joined the Nourse's Horse (Transvaal), South African Forces.

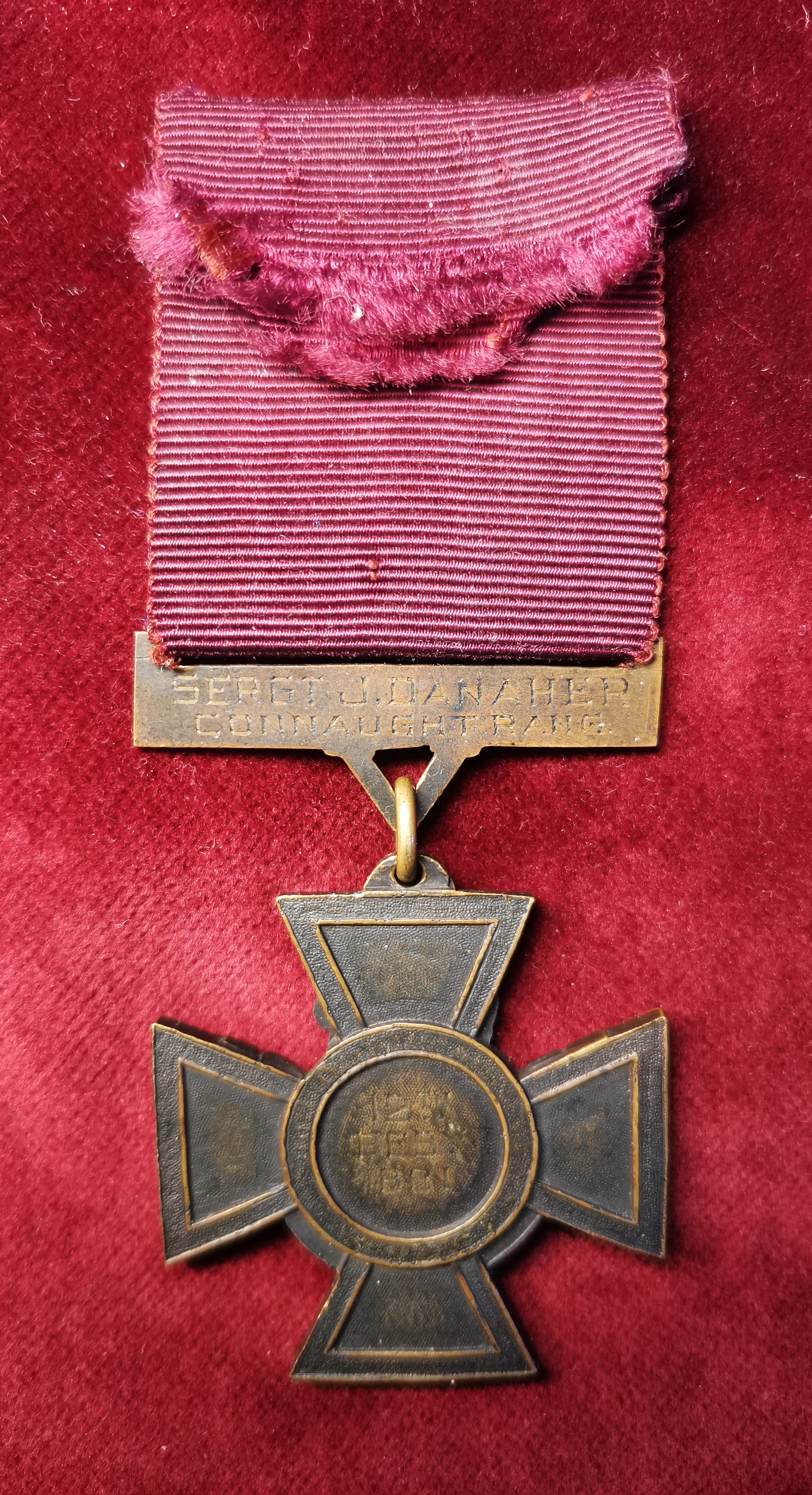
The Duplicate VC attributed to Sgt. Danaher, reverse (private collection)

== Military career ==
He was 20 years old, and a Trooper, on an excursion from Pretoria with the Nourse's Horse (Transvaal) when the following deed took place for which he was awarded the VC.

On 16 January 1881 at Elandsfontein, near Pretoria, South Africa, Trooper Danaher, with a lance-corporal of the Connaught Rangers, (James Murray) advanced for 500 yards under heavy fire from a party of about 60 of the enemy, and brought out of action a private who had been severely wounded.

Danaher resigned from the Nourse's Horse in March 1881, and subsequently joined a British Army unit, the Connaught Rangers. He returned to Limerick with the Rangers in 1882, and later achieved the rank of sergeant before retiring from military service in 1908. Danaher moved to Portsmouth, becoming a publican. He was the landlord of the Dog & Duck Public House at 115 Fratton Road, Portsmouth from 1913 until his death on 9 January 1919. His wife, Mrs B. Danagher, succeeded him as Landlady and his son subsequently took over as Landlord in 1936/7.

His Victoria Cross is held by the National Army Museum (Chelsea, England).
