= Thomas Hughes (VC) =

British-Irish soldier (1885–1942)

- Born: 10 November 1885; Castleblayney, County Monaghan, Ireland
- Died: 4 January 1942 (aged 56); Carrickmacross, County Monaghan, Ireland
- Burial place: Broomfield, County Monaghan
- Military career
- Allegiance: United Kingdom
- Branch: British Army
- Rank: Corporal
- Unit: Connaught Rangers
- Conflicts: World War I
- Awards: Victoria Cross

Thomas Hughes VC (10 November 1885 – 4 January 1942) was a British Army soldier, and Irish recipient of the Victoria Cross, the highest and most prestigious award for gallantry in the face of the enemy that can be awarded to British and Commonwealth forces.

== Biography ==
Hughes was born 30 May 1885 in Corravoo near Castleblayney, County Monaghan. He moved to England in 1910 and lived at Hednesford, Staffordshire while he worked as a stable hand, and on a coal wharf at Cannock He enlisted at Hednesford on 24 November 1914, under Special Reserve terms of service, to serve 6 years in the Connaught Rangers.

He was 31 years old, and a private in the 6th Battalion, The Connaught Rangers, British Army during the First World War when he was awarded the Victoria Cross for his action which took place during the Battle of the Somme.

On 3 September 1916 at Guillemont, France, Private Hughes was wounded in an attack but returned at once to the firing line after having his wounds dressed. Later, seeing a hostile machine-gun, he dashed out in front of his company, shot the gunner and, single-handed, captured the gun. Though again wounded, he brought back three or four prisoners.

He later achieved the rank of corporal. His wounds left him with difficulty walking and led to his being invalided out of the army in February 1918.

He returned to Ireland after the war to help run a family farm, later purchasing another farm with money locally collected for him. He suffered alcoholism and spent periods in the workhouse. He died in Carrickmacross, County Monaghan on 4 January 1942, aged 56. He never married but he had an illegitimate son, born in England.

He is buried in the cemetery attached to St Patrick's Roman Catholic church in Broomfield, near Castleblayney, in County Monaghan.

His Victoria Cross is held by the National Army Museum, Chelsea, London.
