= Bon Secours Hospital, Dublin =

Hospital in Glasnevin, Dublin, Ireland

Bon Secours Hospital
- Bon Secours Health System
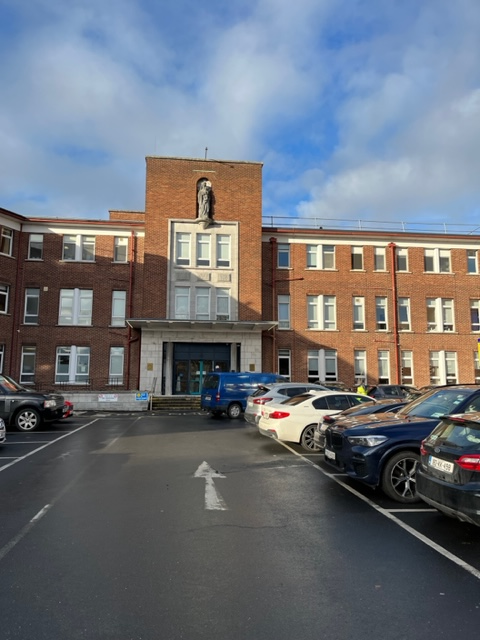
- Main entrance of the hospital up to autumn 2023

- Shown in Dublin

Geography
- Location: Glasnevin, Dublin, Ireland
- Coordinates: 53.3760°N 6.2677°W

Organisation
- Care system: Private
- Type: General

Services
- Beds: 170

History
- Founded: 1951

Links
- Website: www.bonsecours.ie/dublin/

Bon Secours Hospital Dublin is a private, elective acute-care facility situated in Glasnevin, Dublin, Ireland. It is part of the independent hospital group, Bon Secours Health System CLG, a not-for-profit organisation. In 2019, the System merged with Bon Secours Mercy Health. Bon Secours Health System, in addition to Bon Secours Hospital Dublin, also operates four further acute hospitals in Cork, Galway, Limerick and Tralee.

Bon Secours Hospital Dublin employs over 600 staff members, and contracts with a team of 150 consultants.

== History ==
The hospital was designed by Jim Barrett and opened in 1951. It was built on the site of Delville House, an early 18th century house which was the home of Patrick Delany and Mary Delany.

== Services ==
The hospital has 170 beds (inpatient, surgical, medical and oncology day beds), 4 major and 3 minor theatres, 4 endoscopy procedure rooms, a cardiac cath lab and a comprehensive range of ancillary diagnostic treatment and support services. It also has a busy emergency medicine consultant led Acute Medical Assessment Unit for patients with medical conditions requiring rapid assessment, investigation, treatment, and if need be, hospital admission. Other services provided by the hospital include surgery, oncology, cardiology, diagnostic imaging, nutrition and dietetics, histopathology, pharmacy, physiotherapy, and respiratory medicine.

== Accreditation ==
The hospital was the first in Ireland to receive Joint Commission International accreditation in 2002. The hospital was also the first private facility to achieve JAG (Joint Advisory Group) accreditation of its endoscopy Unit in 2016. The hospital has been reaccredited since.

== Teaching ==
Bon Secours Hospital Dublin is affiliated to RCSI for medical training, and also to Dublin City University for nursing training.

== See also ==
- Bon Secours Hospital, Cork
- Bon Secours Hospital, Galway
- Bon Secours Hospital, Tralee
