= Connaught Rangers =

Connaught Rangers (88th Foot & 94th Foot)
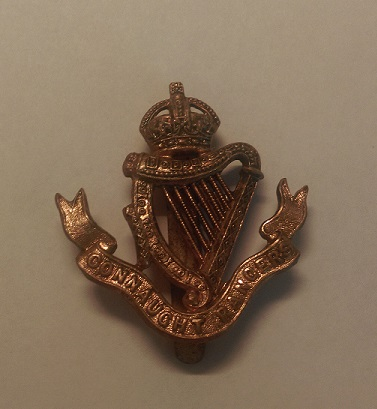
- Connaught Rangers Cap Badge
- Active: 1881–1922
- Country: United Kingdom of Great Britain and Ireland
- Branch: British Army
- Type: Line infantry
- Role: Infantry
- Size: 2 Regular Battalions 2–4 Militia and Special Reserve Battalions Up to 2 Hostilities-only Battalions
- Garrison/HQ: RHQ – Renmore Barracks, Galway
- Nickname: The Devil's Own
- Motto: Quis Separabit (Who will separate us) (Latin)
- March: Quick: Brian Boru March
- Engagements: Egypt 1801; India; South America; The Peninsula; The Crimea; Indian Mutiny; South Africa 1877–1882; Egypt 1884–86; South Africa 1899–1902; The Great War – France & Flanders; Mesopotamia; Macedonia; Gallipoli; Bulgaria

The Connaught Rangers ("The Devil's Own") was an Irish line infantry regiment of the British Army formed by the amalgamation of the 88th Regiment of Foot (Connaught Rangers) (which formed the 1st Battalion) and the 94th Regiment of Foot (which formed the 2nd Battalion) in July 1881. Between the time of its formation and Irish independence, it was one of eight Irish regiments raised largely in Ireland. Its home depot was in Galway. It was disbanded following the establishment of the independent Irish Free State in 1922, along with the other five regiments that had their traditional recruiting grounds in the counties of the new state.

== History ==
=== Early history ===
The regiment was formed by the amalgamation of the 88th Regiment of Foot (Connaught Rangers) (which formed the 1st Battalion) and the 94th Regiment of Foot (which formed the 2nd Battalion) in July 1881. The amalgamation of the two regiments into one with the title The Connaught Rangers, was part of the United Kingdom government's reorganisation of the British Army under the Childers Reforms, a continuation of the Cardwell Reforms implemented in 1879.

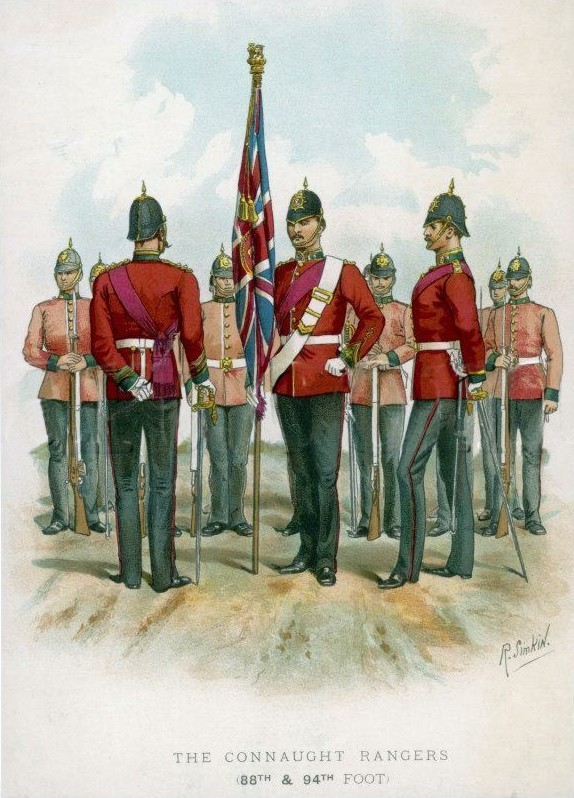
"The Connaught Rangers" by Richard Simkin (1840–1926)

It was one of eight Irish regiments raised largely in Ireland, with its home depot at Renmore Barracks in Galway. The regiment recruited mainly in the province of Connacht. Militarily, the whole of Ireland was administered as a separate command within the United Kingdom with Command Headquarters at Parkgate (Phoenix Park) in Dublin, directly under the War Office in London.

The 88th were based in Bengal, British India, when they were amalgamated into the new regiment. The 94th were based in South Africa at the time of amalgamation; as the 2nd Battalion, it returned to Ireland the following year and sent a small detachment on the Nile Expedition in 1884 as Camel Mounted Infantry. The 2nd Battalion deployed to the Sudan in 1896 for the Dongola Expeditionary Force under the command of Lord Kitchener as part of the reconquest of the Sudan before moving to India in 1897.

=== Second Boer War ===
The 1st Battalion deployed to South Africa as part of 5th (Irish) Brigade, commanded by Major-General Fitzroy Hart, and saw action at the Battle of Colenso in December 1899, part of the attempt to relieve the town of Ladysmith, besieged by Boer forces. The brigade suffered heavily during their participation in the battle, the Boers inflicting heavy casualties: the regiment had 24 men killed and 105 officers and men wounded. The Rangers fought at Spion Kop in January 1900 and the Tugela Heights in February 1900 during further attempts by General Sir Redvers Buller to relieve the besieged town of Ladysmith. In late February the siege of Ladysmith finally came to an end after it was relieved by British forces. The battalion stayed in South Africa after the end of the war (June 1902), leaving Cape Town for Southampton on the SS Staffordshire in January 1903. After a brief stay in Mullingar, they returned to India later in 1903.

In 1908, the Volunteers and Militia were reorganised nationally, with the former becoming the Territorial Force and the latter the Special Reserve; the regiment now had two Reserve but no Territorial battalions.

=== First World War ===
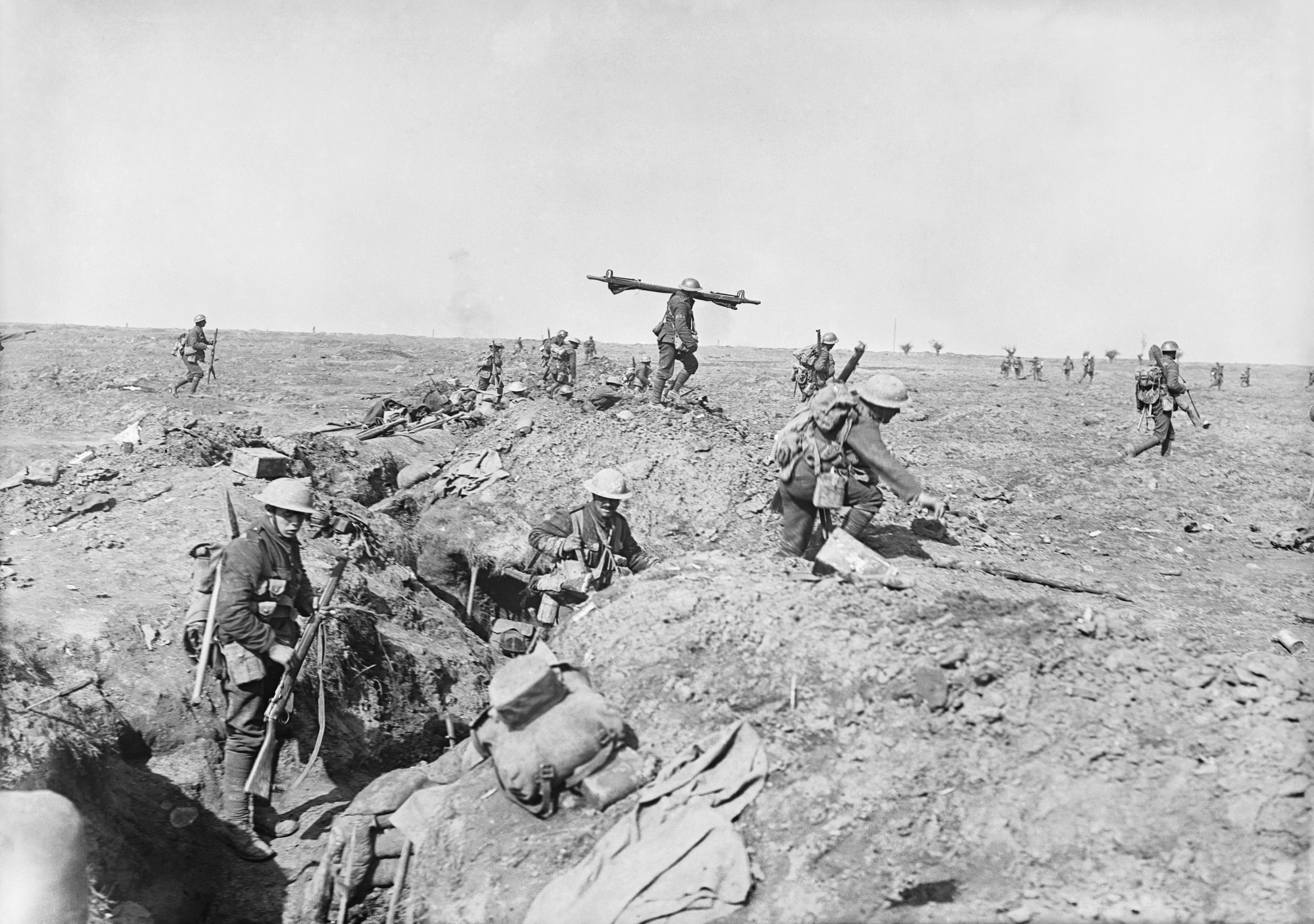
Battle of the Somme. Photo by Ernest Brooks

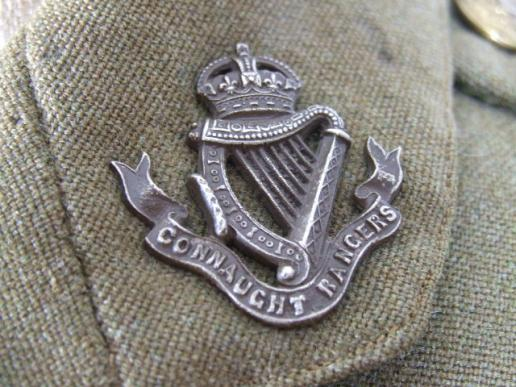
Connaught Rangers Badge 1914

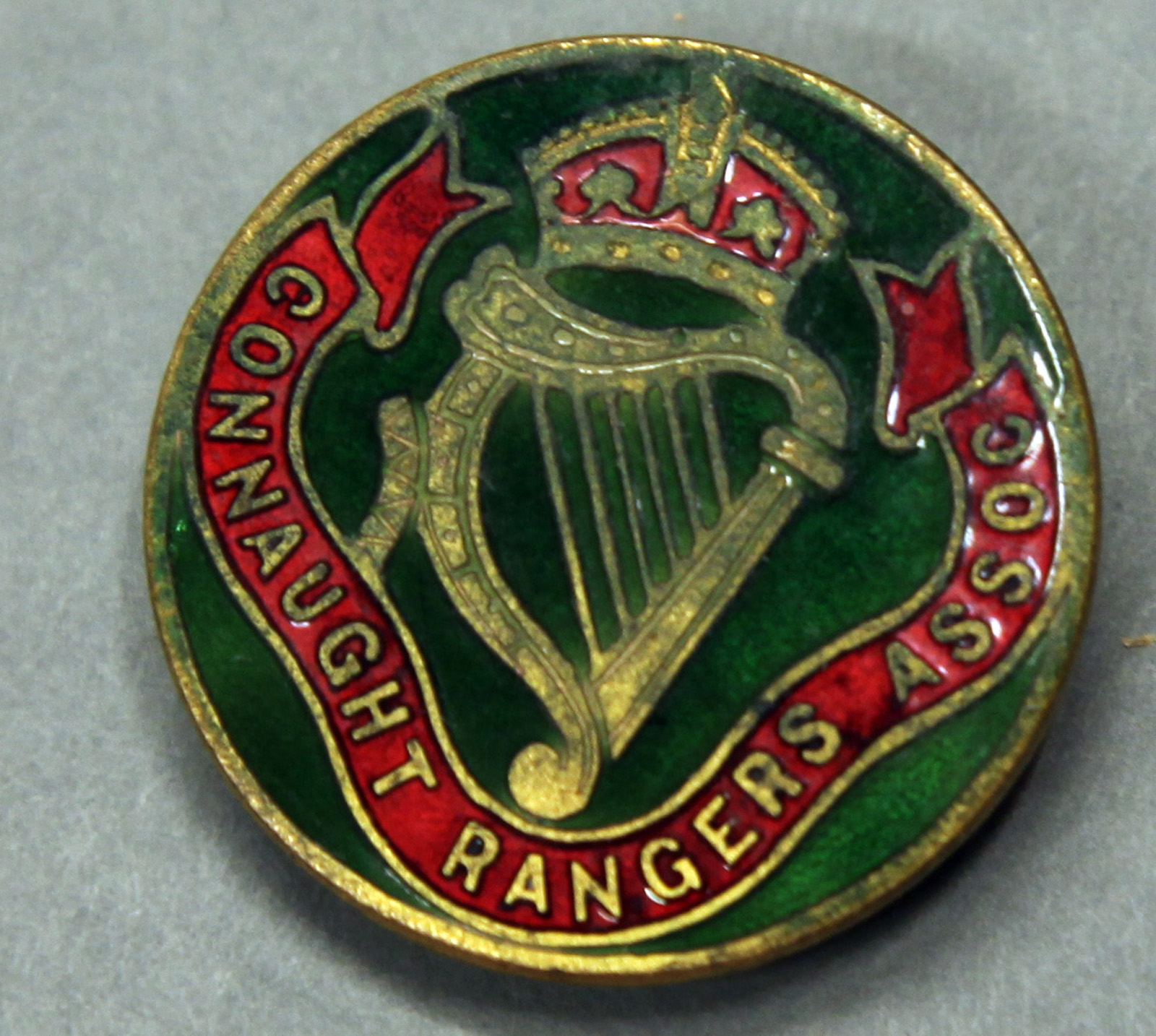
Connaught Rangers Association badge, 1920

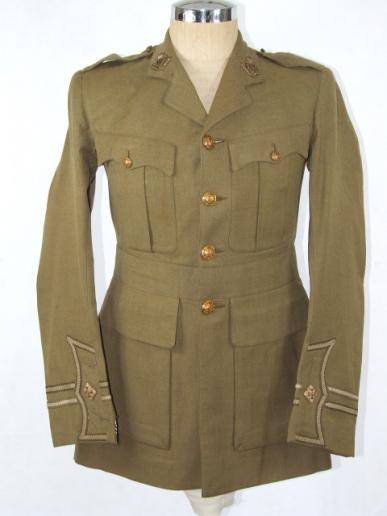
A.L.B. Anderson's Tunic

==== Regular Army ====
The 1st Battalion, which was commanded by Lieutenant-Colonel Hurdis Ravenshaw and had been stationed in Ferozepore, India, landed as part of the 7th (Ferozepore) Brigade in the 3rd (Lahore) Division at Marseille in September 1914 for service on the Western Front.

The 2nd Battalion landed at Boulogne-sur-Mer as part of the 5th Brigade in the 2nd Division with the British Expeditionary Force in August 1914 for service on the Western Front. Its marching song It's a Long Way to Tipperary became famous. By October, the battalion was involved in the fighting around Ypres. On one occasion Private Grogan rushed seven Germans who had occupied a section of trench. He killed all of them. It cost him a cut forehead and four teeth.

Following severe losses in the battles of 1914, the 2nd Battalion was disbanded, with survivors transferring into the 1st Battalion. In turn, the 1st Battalion was redeployed to the Middle East in 1916, where it fought primarily in modern-day Iraq as part of the British Tigris Corps.

The 3rd (Reserve) Battalion was based in Galway upon the declaration of war and would remain in Ireland until November 1917 when it moved to England. The 4th (Extra Reserve) Battalion had been based in Boyle in August and would remain there until November 1917 when it relocated to Scotland: it was absorbed into the 3rd Battalion in May 1918.

==== New Armies ====
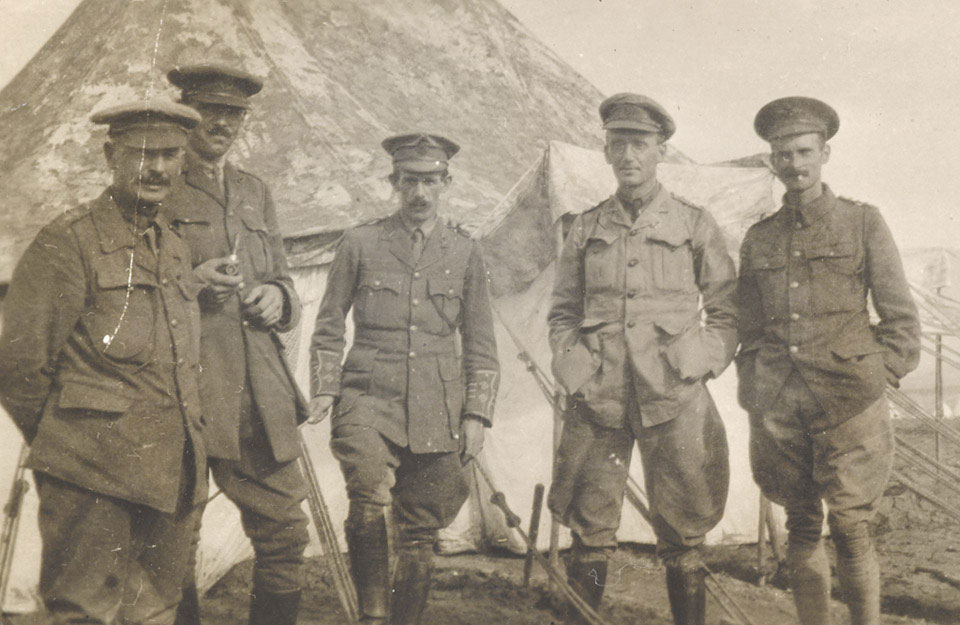
Officers of the 5th (Service) Battalion, Connaught Rangers, at Gallipoli, 1915.

The 5th (Service) Battalion, which was formed in Dublin in August 1914, landed at Anzac Cove in Gallipoli in August 1915 as part of the 29th Brigade in the 10th (Irish) Division but moved to Salonika in September 1915 for service on the Macedonian front and then transferred to Egypt for service in Palestine in September 1917 before landing at Marseilles in June 1918 for service on the Western Front.

The 6th (Service) Battalion, which was formed in County Cork in September 1914 though largely recruited in west Belfast, landed at Le Havre as part of the 47th Brigade in the 16th (Irish) Division in December 1915 for service on the Western Front. In just over a week's fighting in the Battle of the Somme in September 1916, the 6th Battalion lost 23 officers and 407 other ranks. On 21 March 1918, the same Battalion was "practically annihilated" during the German spring offensive breakthrough. In one week the battalion lost "22 officers and 618 other ranks". As a result of these heavy losses, the survivors were transferred into the 2nd Battalion, the Leinster Regiment.

=== 1916 Easter Rising ===
In April 1916, during World War 1, in what became known as the Easter Rising, Irish Republican forces in Ireland launched an armed insurrection against the authority of the government of the United Kingdom, with the declared aim of establishing an Irish Republic wholly independent in its sovereign governance from the United Kingdom. In response, the Connaught Rangers and other British Army units were deployed to fight against the paramilitary forces of the "Irish Volunteers". None of the Connaught Rangers were killed in action but one was wounded.

A 584-man strong column from the 3rd Battalion Connaught Rangers, commanded by Lieutenant Colonel A J Digan DSO, marched on Enniscorthy to fight the rebels who had taken over the town, however on arrival decided not to attack the insurrectionists' positions within the town to avoid turning Enniscorthy into a battlefield. In the days after the insurrection began the Connaughts patrolled the countryside seeking contact with any of those war parties that cared to show themselves, in the process capturing hundreds of prisoners of war and seizing their weapons stocks. A 250 strong force of the Connaughts, under the command of Major H.M. Hutchinson, marched to Ferns on 4 May 1916, and then on to Gorey the next day. A party of 31 Connaught Rangers led by Lieutenant L.C. Badham searched houses in Kinsale on 4 May 1916, and the next day captured a large number of rebels and their weapons. The Connaught Rangers' Column searched houses in New Ross on 9 May 1916 and then at Waterford the next day. The Connaught Rangers Column reached Clonmel on 16 May 1916, searching further residences in the town and capturing another large number of rebels and their weapon-stocks.

Another Column of Connaught Rangers, 422 men strong, led by Major O.F. Lloyd, searched houses in Bandon from 6 to 11 May 1916, capturing further numbers of rebels and weapons. The Column proceeded on to Clonakilty on 11 May and searched the district there also, capturing more rebels and their equipment. This Column marched to Skibbereen on 16 May, and entering the town and fanning out through the surrounding area, succeeded in rounding up yet more rebels with their arms. A number of Connaught Rangers who were in Dublin at the time of the Easter Rising had volunteered for temporary secondment to other units of the British Army such as the Royal Irish Fusiliers and Royal Dublin Fusiliers specifically to take part in the capital city's defence against the rising. Sergeant John Joseph Barror of the Connaught Rangers killed two rebels in the fighting in Dublin.

=== Postwar ===
Following demobilization the Connaught Rangers was reduced to its peacetime establishment of two regular battalions. With the outbreak of the Irish War of Independence in 1919 both were stationed outside Ireland (the 2nd Battalion in Dover and the 1st in India). This was part of a general policy aimed at minimizing the pressures of divided loyalties, by relocating serving Irish regiments during "the troubles".

=== Mutiny in India, 1920 ===
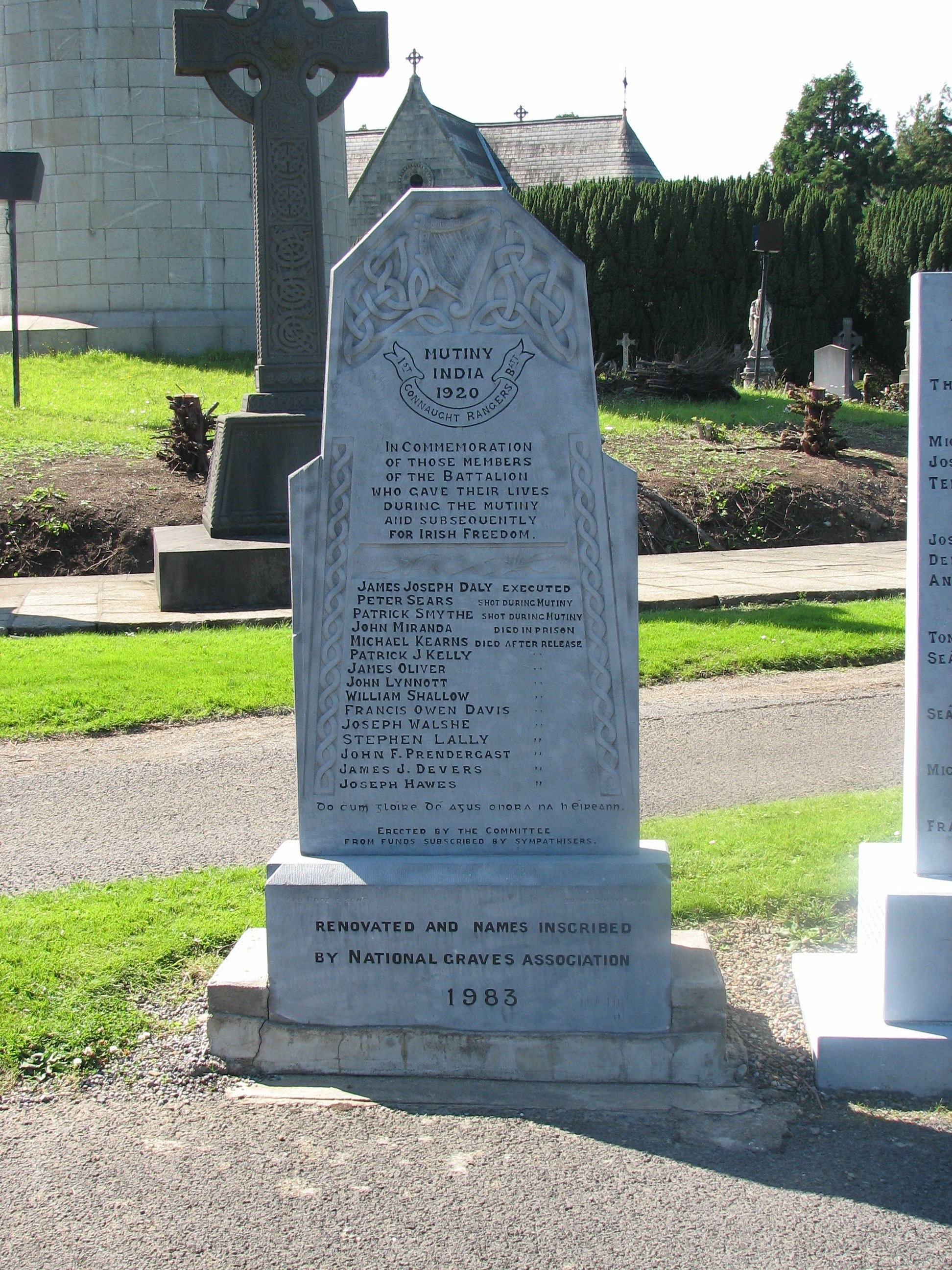
Connaught Rangers mutineers' memorial, Glasnevin Cemetery, Dublin

On 28 June 1920, four men from C Company of the 1st Battalion, based at Wellington Barracks, Jalandhar in the Punjab, protested against martial law in Ireland by refusing to obey orders. One of them, Joe Hawes, had been on leave in Clare in October 1919 and had seen a hurling match prevented from happening by British forces with bayonets drawn. Poor accommodation conditions in the Wellington Barracks may have provided an additional cause of the dispute.

The protestors were soon joined by other Rangers, including several English soldiers, such as John Miranda from Liverpool and Sergeant Woods. By the following morning, when a rebel muster took place, over 300 soldiers were involved in the mutiny.

On 30 June 1920, two mutineers from the Jalandhar barracks (Frank Geraghty and Patrick Kelly) travelled to Solon barracks where C Company were stationed and, despite arrest, helped spark a mutiny there, led by Private James Daly, whose brother William also took part in the protest.

Initially, the protests were peaceful with the men involved donning green, white and orange rosettes and singing Irish nationalist songs. At Solon, however, on the evening of 1 July a party of about thirty men led by James Daly, carrying bayonets, attempted to seize their company's rifles, stored in the armoury. The troops guarding the magazine opened fire and two men were killed: Pte. Smythe who was with Daly's party, and Pte. Peter Sears (who had not been involved in the attack on the magazine but was returning to his billet when hit by a stray bullet). Within days, both garrisons were occupied by other British troops. Daly and his followers surrendered and were arrested. Eighty-eight mutineers were court-martialed: seventy-seven were sentenced to imprisonment and ten were acquitted. James Daly was shot by a firing squad at Dagshai Prison on 2 November 1920. He was the last member of the British Armed Forces to be executed for mutiny. The bodies of Ptes. Sears and Smythe were buried at Solan, while Daly and Miranda (who later died in prison) were buried at a cemetery in Dagshai. Among those who received a sentence of life in prison was Martin Conlon (a half brother to the eight brothers from Sligo town who fought in the First World War, in which four were killed in action).

In 1923, following Irish Independence, the imprisoned mutineers were released and returned to Ireland. In 1936, the Free State's Fianna Fáil government awarded pensions to those whose British Army pensions were forfeited by conviction for their part in the mutiny. The bodies of Ptes. Sears, Smythe, and Daly were repatriated from India to Ireland for reburial in 1970.

=== Disbandment ===
Due to substantial defence cuts and the establishment of the Irish Free State in 1922, it was decided that the six former Southern Ireland regiments would be disbanded, including the Connaught Rangers. On 12 June, five regimental colours were laid up in a ceremony at St George's Hall, Windsor Castle in the presence of HM King George V. The six regiments were then all disbanded on 31 July 1922. With the simultaneous outbreak of the Irish Civil War conflict some thousands of their ex-servicemen and officers contributed to expanding the Free State government's newly formed National Army. They brought considerable combat experience with them contributing significantly to the success of the Free State’s cause, and by May 1923 comprised 50 per cent of its 53,000 soldiers and 20 per cent of its officers.

== Memorials ==
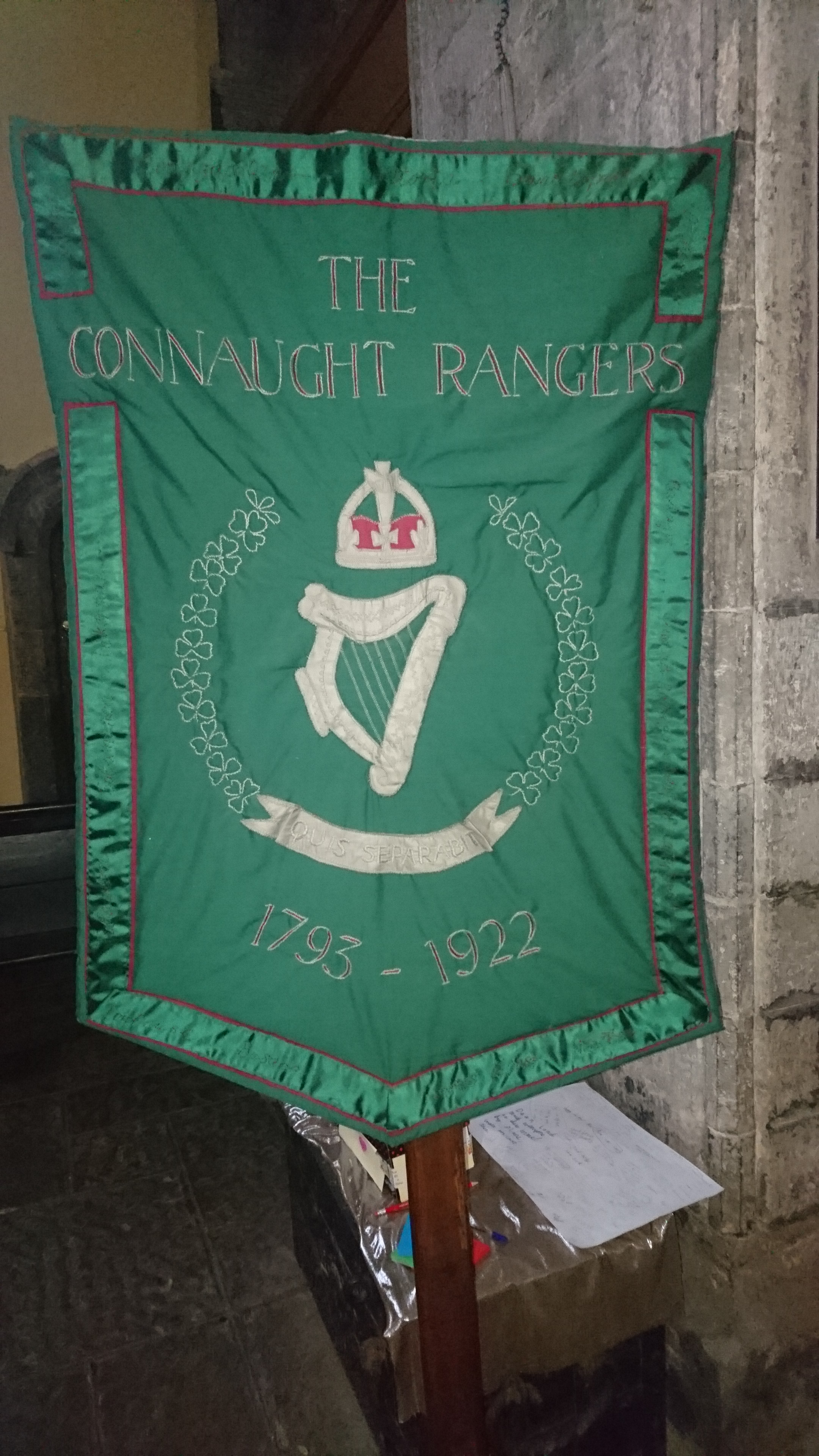
Banner commemorating the regiment in St. Nicholas' Collegiate Church, Galway.

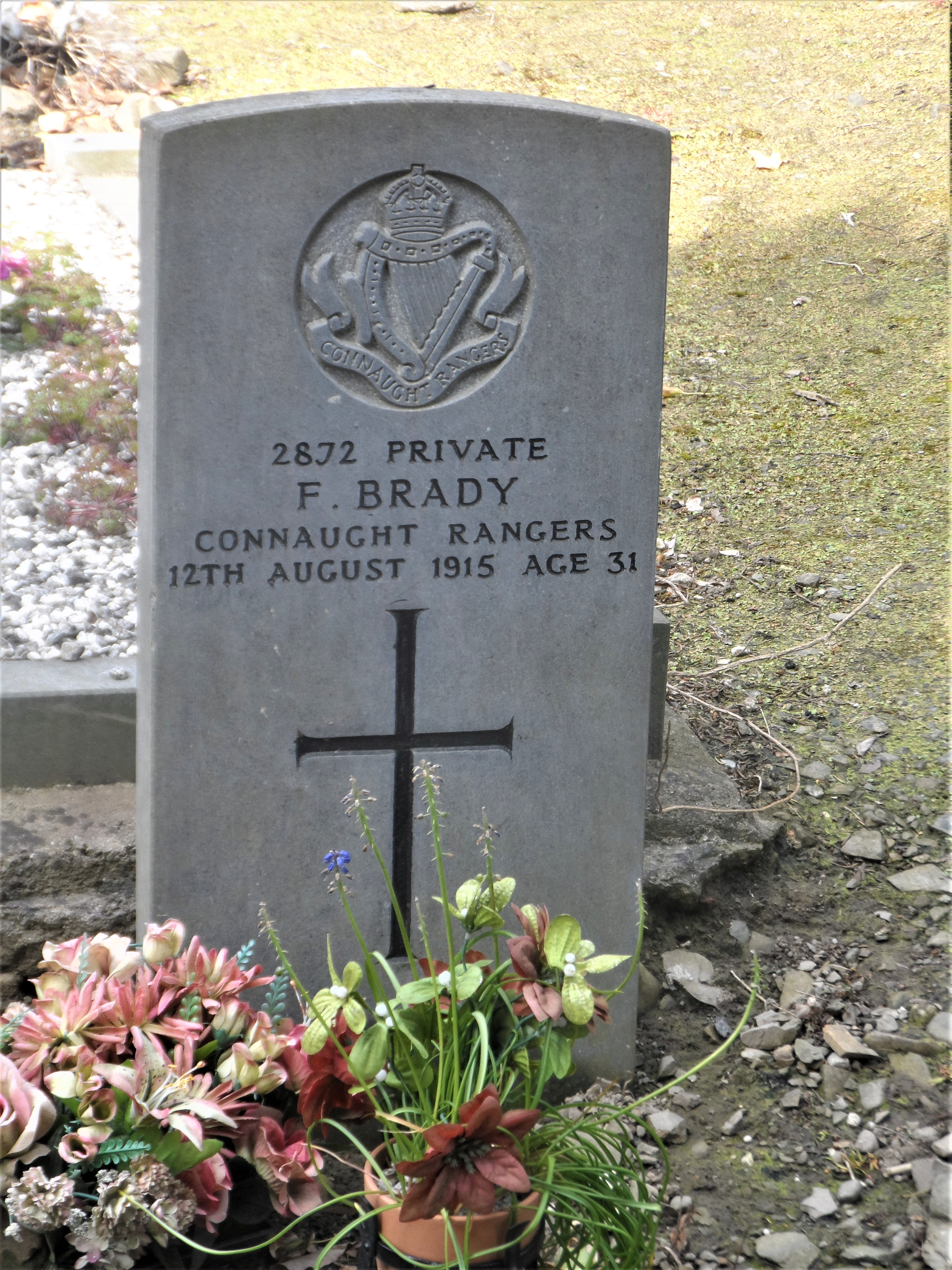
Gravestone of Private F. Brady, Connaught Rangers, in Kells, County Meath.

In 1966 a stained glass memorial window to the Connaught Rangers was included in the new Galway Cathedral, which renders honour to a regiment so long associated with that part of Ireland.

There are various memorials to the regiment and its soldiers in St. Nicholas' Collegiate Church in Galway.

== Battle honours ==
The regiment was awarded the following battle honours:

- From the 88th Regiment of Foot: Egypt, Talavera, Busaco, Fuentes d'Onoro, Ciudad Rodrigo, Badajoz, Salamanca, Vittoria, Nivelle, Orthes, Toulouse, Peninsula, Alma, Inkerman, Sevastopol, Central India
- From the 94th Regiment of Foot: Seringapatam, Ciudad Rodrigo, Badajoz, Salamanca, Vittoria, Nivelle, Orthes, Toulouse, Peninsula, Pyrenees, South Africa 1877-78-79
- Second Boer War: Relief of Ladysmith, South Africa 1899–1902
- The Great War: Mons, Retreat from Mons, Marne 1914, Aisne 1914, Messines 1914 '17, Armentières 1914, Ypres 1914 '15 '17, Langemarck 1914 '17, Gheluvelt, Nonne Bosschen, Festubert 1914, Givenchy 1914, Neuve Chapelle, St. Julien, Aubers, Somme, 1916 '18, Guillemont, Ginchy, St. Quentin, Bapaume 1918, Rosières, Hindenburg Line, Cambrai 1918, Selle, France and Flanders 1914–1918, Kosturino, Struma, Macedonia 1915–17, Suvla, Sari Bair, Scimitar Hill, Gallipoli 1915, Gaza, Jerusalem, Tell 'Asur, Megiddo, Sharon, Palestine 1917–18, Tigris 1916, Kut al Amara 1917, Baghdad, Mesopotamia 1916–18

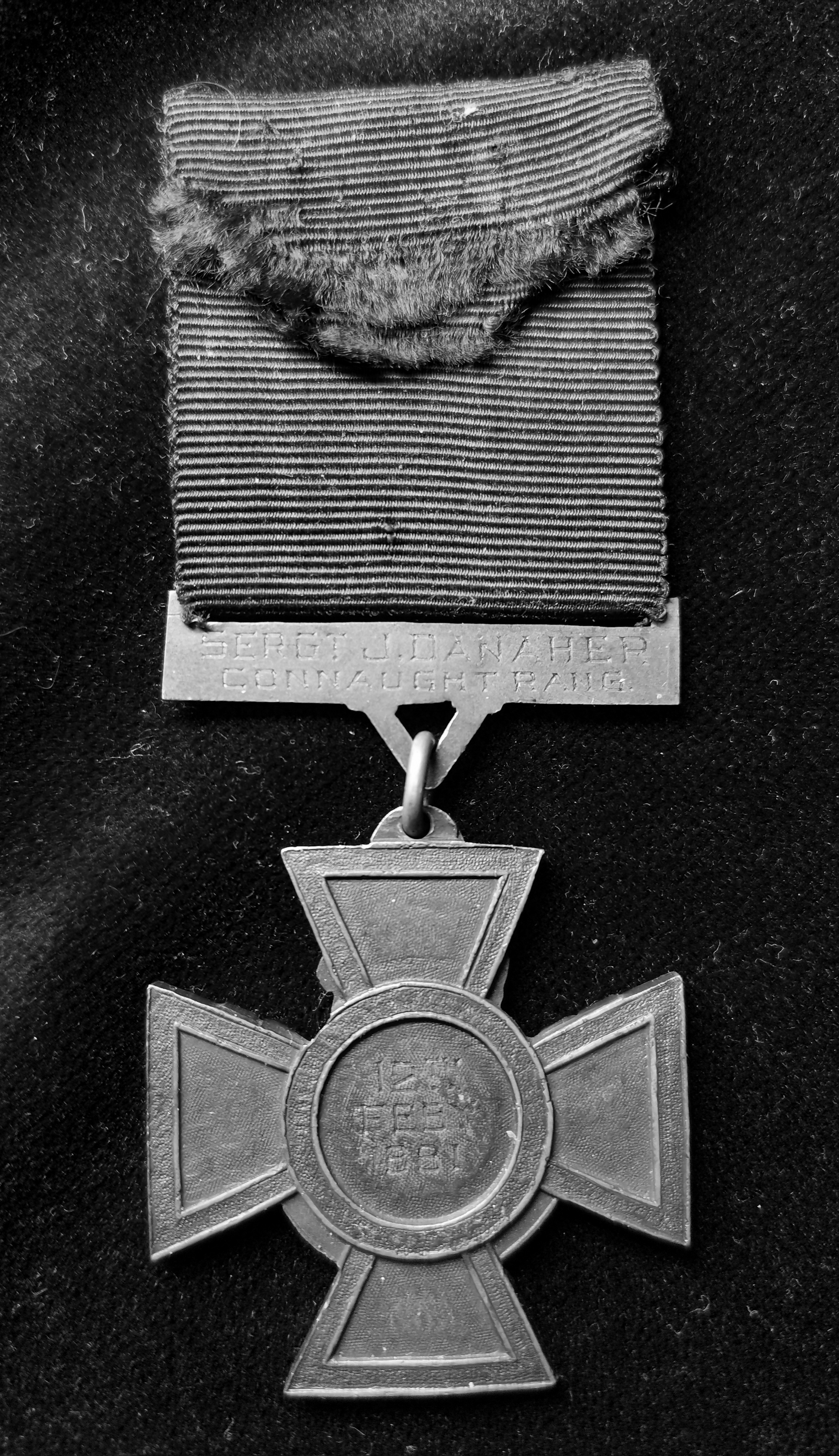
The reverse of Sgt. Danaher's duplicate VC

== Victoria Crosses ==
- Private Thomas Hughes - First World War, 3 September 1916
- Lance Corporal James Murray - First Boer War, 16 January 1881
- Sergeant John Danaher - First Boer War, 12 February 1881 (the unit, according to the naming engraved on his duplicate VC see picture; private collection)

== Regimental Colonels ==
Colonels of the regiment were:

- 1881–?1889: (1st Battalion): Gen. William Irwin (ex 88th Foot)
- 1881–1886: (2nd Battalion): Gen. Sir John Thornton Grant, KCB (ex 94th Foot)
- 1889–1900: Gen. Joseph Edwin Thackwell, CB
- 1900–1912: Lt-Gen. Sir Edward Hopton, KCB
- 1912–1922: Maj-Gen. William Liston Dalrymple, CB
- 1922: Regiment disbanded

== Great War Memorials ==
- Irish National War Memorial Gardens, Dublin.
- Island of Ireland Peace Park Messines, Belgium.
- Ulster Tower Memorial Thiepval, France.
- Menin Gate Memorial Ypres, Belgium.

== Uniforms and insignia ==
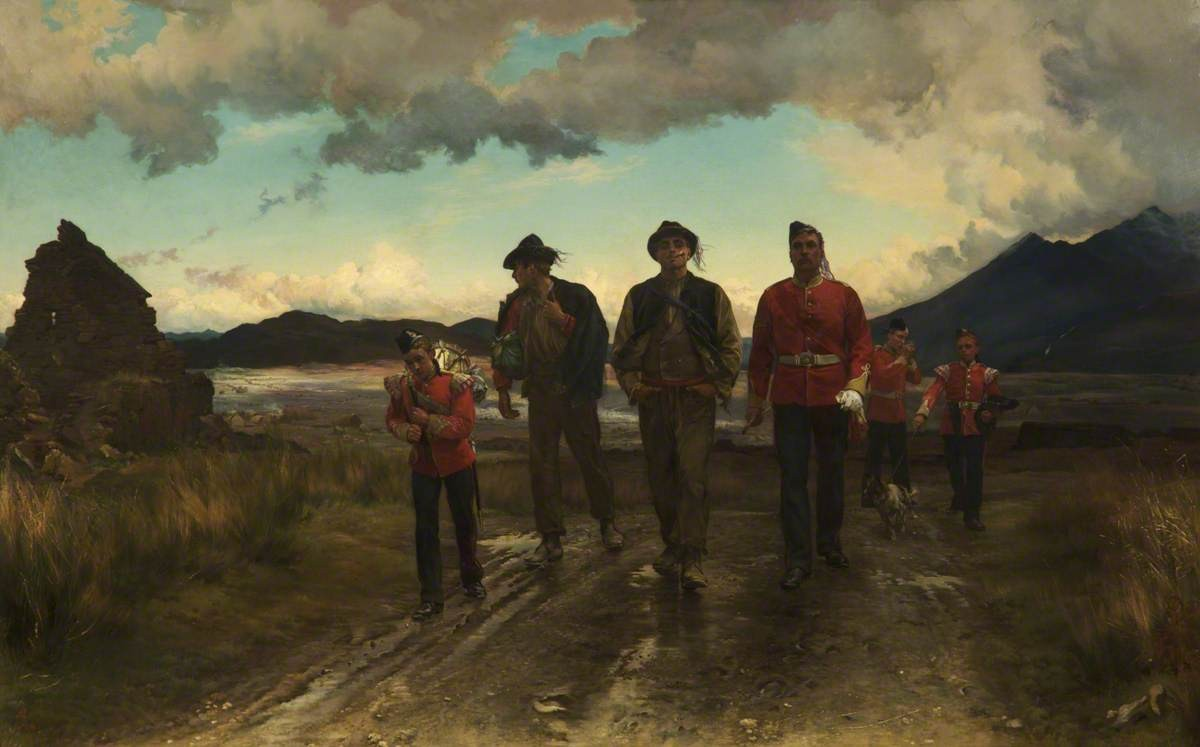
Listed for the Connaught Rangers by Elizabeth Thompson, 1878

From 1881 to 1914 the Connaught Rangers wore the standard scarlet and blue full dress of British infantry (see illustration above) with green facings. The green collars and cuffs were intended to be a national distinction for infantry regiments recruited in Ireland but the Connaught Rangers was the only one of these not to have a "Royal" title and accordingly the distinction of dark blue facings.

The regimental buttons had a harp and crown surrounded by a shamrock wreath. The harp and crown reappeared on cap and home service helmet badges, in silver on a green background.

== Nickname ==
In the mid-19th century a tradition grew up that the 88th had been given the nickname 'Devil's Own' by Major General Thomas Picton during the Peninsular War, "as a compliment to their dauntless bravery in presence of the enemy, and their uniform irregularity in camp and quarters", a tradition that was inherited by the Connaught Rangers when the 88th and 94th were joined to form the new regiment in 1881. However, there is no contemporary record of the 88th receiving this sobriquet, and subsequent regimental histories and memoirs make no reference either to the nickname or its origins.

== See also ==
- Royal Irish Rangers

== Sources ==
- Boyle, John F. (2009). The Irish Rebellion of 1916: a brief history of the revolt and its suppression. BiblioBazaar. ISBN 978-1290147095.
- Churchill, W.S. (1900). London to Ladysmith via Pretoria, London. Longmans, Green & Co. ISBN 978-1557423825.
- Cottrell, Peter (2008). The Irish Civil War 1922–23. Osprey Publishing. ISBN 978-1-84603-270-7.
- Denman, Terence (1992). Ireland's unknown soldiers: the 16th (Irish) Division in the Great War, 1914–1918. Irish Academic Press. ISBN 978-0716525615.
- Harris, Major Henry E. D. (1968). The Irish Regiments in the First World War. Mercer Press Cork. ISBN 978-0853420729.
- Jourdain, Lieutenant-Colonel H. F. N. CMG. The Connaught Rangers – 1st Battalion, Formerly 88th Foot. London, Royal United Service Institution, 1926 3-volume regimental history. Vol.1: 1st Battalion, 1793–1922; Vol.2: 2nd, 3rd and 4th Battalions, 1793–1922; Vol.3: 5th and 6th (Service) Battalions, 1914–18.
- Martin, Francis (1967). Leaders and Men of the Easter Rising: Dublin 1916. Cornell University Press. ISBN 978-0801402906.
- McCarthy, Mark (2012). Ireland's 1916 Rising: Explorations of History-Making, Commemoration & Heritage in Modern Times. Ashgate Publishing. ISBN 978-1409436232.
- Murphy, David (2007). Irish Regiments in the World Wars. Osprey Publishing. ISBN 978-1846030154.
- Pollock, Sam (1971). Mutiny for the Cause. Lee Cooper, London, 1969. ISBN 978-0722169315.
- Reagan, Geoffrey (1992). Military Anecdotes. Guinness Publishing. ISBN 0-85112-519-0.
