= Bon Secours Hospital, Galway =

- Bon Secours Health System
- Shown in Ireland

Geography
- Location: Renmore, Galway, Ireland
- Coordinates: 53.2781°N 9.0201°W

Organisation
- Care system: Private
- Type: General

Services
- Beds: 120

History
- Opened: 1954

Links
- Website: Official Website

The Bon Secours Hospital, Galway is a private hospital in County Galway, Ireland. The hospital is part of Bon Secours Mercy Health. This includes sister hospitals in Cork, Dublin, Limerick and Tralee. The hospital sees over 18,000 patients per annum, comprising 6,000 in-patients and 12,000 day-cases.

== History ==
Bon Secours Hospital Galway was built in 1954 and was known then as Calvary Hospital. It was owned and managed by the Sisters of the Little Company of Mary until 1985. Following a short closure, the hospital reopened as Galvia Private Hospital in 1986. In 1998, Galvia Private Hospital was purchased by the Bon Secours Health System, and since then is part of Bon Secours Mercy Health. This includes sister hospitals in Cork, Dublin, Limerick and Tralee. The hospital sees over 18,000 patients per annum, comprising 6,000 in-patients and 12,000 day-cases.

In April 2024, the hospital announced plans for a €36.5 million expansion, which aims to add two new theatres, four theatre recovery bays, and 14 surgical dayward bays, as well as a fourth endoscopy treatment room and 16 new endoscopy bays to expand endoscopy services.

== Services ==
The hospital had major expansions in 2006 and 2009–2011, and has 120 beds, including 22 day case beds, and provides 4 operating theatres. Services provided include cardiology, clinical neurophysiology, histopathology, physiotherapy, respiratory medicine, endoscopy, pharmacy, occupational therapy, and radiology.

== Accreditation ==
Bon Secours Hospital, Galway first received Joint Commission International (JCI) accreditation in 2005. In October 2023, the hospital was re-accredited and also together with all Bon Secours Health System became the first organisation in Ireland and one of seven worldwide to earn JCI Enterprise Accreditation.

== Sponsorships ==
Bon Secours Hospital, Galway have a partnership with football club Galway United, allowing players access to state of the art facilities and resources.

In April 2025, the hospital partnered with Little Blue Heroes Foundation for a charity bed push.

== Notable patients ==
Michael D. Higgins, the President of Ireland, had knee surgery at Bon Secours Hospital, Galway in December 2011, related to a previous injury.

== See also ==
- Bon Secours Hospital, Cork
- Bon Secours Hospital, Dublin
- Bon Secours Hospital, Tralee
