= Bon Secours Hospital, Tralee =

Bon Secours Hospital
- Bon Secours Health System
- Shown in Ireland

Geography
- Location: Strand Street, Tralee, County Kerry, Ireland
- Coordinates: 52.2696°N 9.7131°W

Organisation
- Care system: Private
- Type: General

Services
- Beds: 130

History
- Founded: 1921

Links
- Website: www.bonsecours.ie/tralee/

The Bon Secours Hospital, Tralee is a private hospital in County Kerry, Ireland. The hospital is part of Bon Secours Mercy Health. This includes sister hospitals in Cork, Dublin, Galway and Limerick.

== History ==
The hospital in Tralee was established by the Bon Secours Sisters in 1921.

== Services ==
The hospital provides 130 acute-care beds. Services provided include angiography, cardiology, bone densitometry, dietetics, diagnostic imaging, general medicine, intensive care medicine, general surgery, paediatrics, pharmacy, respiratory medicine, physiotherapy, and radiology.

== Accreditation ==
The hospital received Joint Commission International accreditation in 2005.
