= Bon Secours Health System =

The Bon Secours Health System is the largest private hospital network in Ireland. It was formed in 1993 to co-ordinate the health care facilities in Ireland managed by the Roman Catholic Sisters of Bon Secours.

== Background ==
The Congregation of the Sisters of Bon Secours was founded in Paris in 1824. One of the first of the congregations of nursing sisters, its object was to nurse the sick in their own homes.

The Archbishop De Quélen gave the group the name – "bon secours" means "good help" in French. Their work soon spread to other French cities such as Lille and Boulogne-Sur-Mer. Catherine O'Ferrall, who was acquainted with their work in Paris, invited the sisters to Ireland.

== History ==
In 1861, four Sisters of Bon Secours arrived in Dublin and established the congregation's first mission outside France. Their in-home nursing included providing care for the particular patients, and assistance with basic needs for other family members. As news of their work spread, they were invited to work in other dioceses.

- Bon Secours Hospital, Cork, was established in 1915. With 300 beds, it is the largest private hospital in Ireland and is a teaching hospital affiliated with University College Cork.
- Bon Secours Hospital, Tralee, was established in 1921. It is an acute-care facility with 130 beds.
- Bon Secours Hospital, Dublin, is an independent acute care hospital located in Glasnevin in North Dublin established in 1951. It was the first in Ireland to receive Joint Commission International accreditation.
- Bon Secours Hospital, Galway, was built in 1954 and was known then as Calvary Hospital. It was owned and managed by the Sisters of the Little Company of Mary until 1985. Following a short closure the hospital reopened as Galvia in 1986. In 1998, Galvia Private Hospital was purchased by Bon Secours Healthcare System.
- Barringtons Hospital, Limerick, was established in 1929 at George's Quay by Joseph Barrington and his sons. It closed in 1988. In 1991, it was acquired by the vascular surgeon Paul O'Byrne who saw a need for a private hospital in the area.

In 2015, the for-profit Bon Secours Health System had about 2,700 staff who worked with 350 medical consultants and saw more than 200,000 patients, making €2.5 million in profit after paying €3 million to the order in rent.

In 2019, Bon Secours Health System of Dublin merged with Bon Secours Mercy Health of Cincinnati, Ohio. Together, the health systems have 60,000 employees serving more than 10.5 million people through nearly 50 hospitals, more than 50 home health agencies and senior health and housing facilities. It is owned by the Bon Secours Sisters

== See also ==
- List of hospitals in Ireland
- Bon Secours Health System (US)
