= Bon Secours Hospital, Cork =

Bon Secours Hospital
- Bon Secours Health System
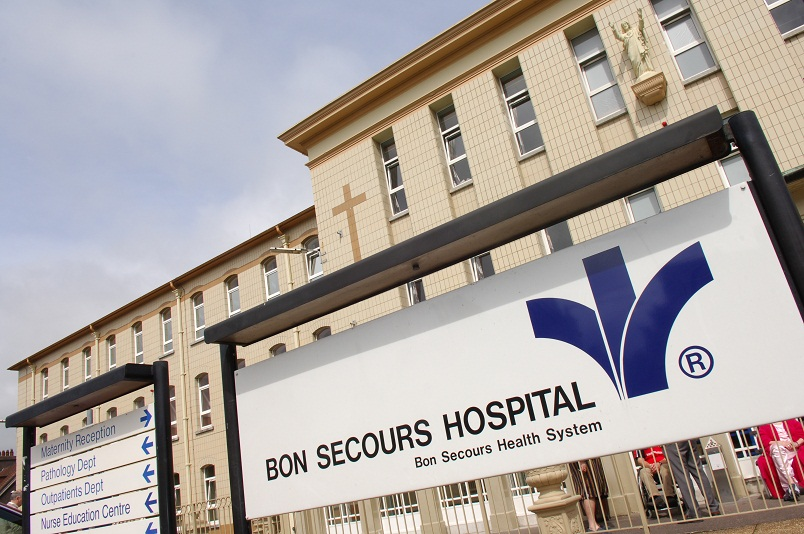
- Facade of Bon Secours Cork

- Shown in Ireland

Geography
- Location: College Road, Cork, Ireland
- Coordinates: 51.8914°N 8.4979°W

Organisation
- Care system: Private
- Type: General

Services
- Beds: 343

History
- Founded: 1915

Links
- Website: www.bonsecours.ie/cork/

The Bon Secours Hospital, Cork is a private hospital in Cork, Ireland. The hospital is part of Bon Secours Mercy Health. This includes sister hospitals in Dublin, Galway, Limerick and Tralee. The hospital has over 18,000 admissions and 29,000 outpatients attendances per year.

== History ==
The separate hospital and convent blocks in Cork were commissioned by the Bon Secours Sisters and completed in 1915.

== Services ==
The hospital has 343 in-patient beds. There are 30 day case beds, 30 endoscopy beds and 6 oncology day spaces. The hospital has 5 major and 2 minor operating theatres. Services provided include cardiology, diagnostic imaging, nutrition and dietetics, histopathology, pharmacy, physiotherapy, respiratory medicine, angiography, cardiac rehabilitation, diabetes specialist services, intensive care, and oncology. In 2008 the hospital opened a Rapid Access Chest Pain clinic for same day assessment of chest pain referred patients. In 2009 the hospital opened a Specialist Breast Care Clinic, which offers a triple assessment to patients within 3 days of referral. In 2011 in co-operation with the Irish Cancer Society, a Daffodil Centre was opened in the hospital to provide information services to patients their families and the general public. The hospital is a centre for surgical solutions for morbid obesity. The Bon Secours Cork Cancer Centre in association with UPMC opened in 2019.

== Accreditation ==
The hospital received Joint Commission International accreditation in 2005.

== See also ==
- Bon Secours Hospital, Dublin
- Bon Secours Hospital, Galway
- Bon Secours Hospital, Tralee
