= Willy Ramirez case =

1980 American medical malpractice case

The Willy Ramirez case concerns the 1980 misdiagnosis of 18-year-old baseball player Willy Ramirez as having suffered a drug overdose, in part due to a mistranslation between English and Spanish. Ramirez had actually suffered a intracerebral hemorrhage and became quadriplegic due to the lack of adequate and timely treatment. A medical malpractice lawsuit against the hospital where he was treated resulted in a $71 million settlement, and the case has been the subject of case studies relating to the role of interpreters in medicine.

== Description ==
On the evening of January 22, 1980, 18-year-old Willy Ramirez, a Cuban-American baseball player from South Florida, started feeling a headache while out with a friend. He first attributed the pain to the smell of gasoline in his friend's car. The pain then worsened to the point that Ramirez was unable to walk and had to be helped to his car by his friend. After going to his girlfriend's house, an ambulance was called and Ramirez was taken by ambulance to a South Florida hospital in a comatose state.

Upon arrival, he was accompanied by his girlfriend and sister, who were bilingual English and Spanish speakers, and by his mother and his girlfriend's mother, who had low English language proficiency. In the ensuing conversation, there was a significant language barrier between hospital staff and Ramirez's family, who at one point speculated that he might have gotten food poisoning from eating lunch at a nearby Wendy's restaurant; this was misunderstood by staff as a potential drug overdose, which doctors later stated was consistent with Ramirez's symptoms.

The misunderstanding hinged on the Spanish word "intoxicado", which is used to refer to poisoning in general as opposed to its English-language false friend "intoxicated", which implies the influence of psychoactive drugs. Researcher Gail Price-Wise asserts that the diagnosis may also have been influenced by a prejudiced association between drug abuse and young Cuban men.

Ramirez was treated for a drug overdose, but had in fact suffered an intracerebral hemorrhage that remained untreated for more than 36 hours as he lay unconscious. The medical error was only noticed after an examination by a neurologist; surgery was then performed to stop the bleeding, but the delay caused Ramirez to become quadriplegic.

== Litigation ==
Ramirez's family later filed a medical malpractice lawsuit against the hospital where he was treated. During proceedings, it was asserted that Ramirez could have walked out of the hospital had the neurosurgeon been called in earlier. The suit was settled for a sum of approximately $71 million to be paid over the course of Ramirez's life.

== Aftermath and legacy ==
Ramirez's case is cited as an example of why medical interpreters are important to prevent misunderstandings in critical situations, and has been used as a case study in training.
