= Kenneth I. Shine =

American cardiologist, physiologist, and health policy leader

- Born: January 30, 1935 (age 91)
- Education: Harvard College; Harvard Medical School
- Known for: Institute of Medicine presidency Health care quality and patient safety University of Texas health affairs leadership Medical education reform
- Awards: Member, National Academy of Medicine (1988); Fellow, American Academy of Arts and Sciences; John M. Eisenberg Patient Safety and Quality Award
- Scientific career
- Fields: Cardiology; Physiology; Health policy Medical education
- Workplaces: Massachusetts General Hospital; University of California, Los Angeles; Institute of Medicine; University of Texas System; Dell Medical School

Kenneth Irwin Shine (born January 30, 1935) is an American cardiologist, physiologist, academic administrator, and health policy leader. He was president of the Institute of Medicine, now the National Academy of Medicine, from 1992 to 2002, and later served as executive vice chancellor for health affairs of the University of Texas System.

== Education, medical training, and academic career ==
Shine earned his undergraduate degree from Harvard College in 1957, an A.B. degree in biochemical sciences, and his M.D. from Harvard Medical School in 1961. He was trained in internal medicine at Massachusetts General Hospital and became chief resident in medicine at Massachusetts General Hospital in 1968.

After his training, Shine was a cardiologist and physiologist on the faculty at the University of California, Los Angeles. At UCLA, he built the cardiology division and dean of the UCLA School of Medicine in 1986. As dean at UCLA, he supported an early doctoring course beginning in the first year of medical school. Shine eventually became provost for Health Sciences; in this role, he helped build new research facilities, helped establish a Howard Hughes Medical Institute presence on campus, and led development of medical student programs in history, humanities, and health science research.

== Research ==
During his residency at MGH, Shine worked with Peter Yurchak and others characterizing multifocal atrial tachycardia. At UCLA, he led cardiovascular research on metabolism during cardiac anoxia and studied glutamate metabolism during anoxia, magnesium in myocardial metabolism, and calcium physiology.

== Institute of Medicine ==
Shine was elected to the Institute of Medicine in 1988 and named president of the Institute of Medicine in 1992, a position that he held for ten years, making him the first Institute of Medicine president to serve two full terms. Under his leadership, reports issued by the Institute of Medicine addressed quality of care, patient safety, food safety, tobacco use, and end-of-life care. One of the reports, To Err is Human: Building a Safer Health System focused on preventable medical errors and argued for system-level approaches to patient safety. Another report published during Shine's presidency, Crossing the Quality Chasm, called for redesign of the U.S. health care system; it is associated with the six aims of care: safe, effective, patient-centered, timely, efficient, and equitable. The reports increased national awareness of quality-of-care and patient-safety issues.

== University of Texas System ==
In 2003, Shine joined the University of Texas System as the executive vice chancellor for health affairs; in that role, he was responsible for six UT System health campuses. He subsequently served as interim chancellor of the UT System, from April 2008 to January 2009. Shine led efforts to create two new medical schools, Dell Medical School at UT Austin and the medical school at the University of Texas Rio Grande Valley. The University of Texas System credited his work with helping lay the foundation for the Austin medical school. He led or created UT System initiatives in clinical effectiveness, patient safety, public health, and medical education transformation. He initiated Transformation in Medical Education pilot projects with six-, seven-, or eight-year pathways to the M.D. degree, and brought quality-of-care initiatives to the UT System through the Code Red reports and related work. His retirement from the executive vice chancellor role was announced in 2012, taking effect in early 2013.

== Professional service ==
- Member of the Association of American Physicians
- President of the American Heart Association (1985–1986)
- Served on and chaired the scientific advisory committee to Massachusetts General Hospital
- Member of the Dean's Advisory Committee for Harvard Medical School and of the Medical School Alumni Council

== Honors and awards ==
- Member of the National Academy of Medicine, elected 1988.
- Fellow of the American Academy of Arts and Sciences, elected 1996.
- Fratis L. Duff, M.D. Memorial Award, Texas Health Institute (2014).
- Founder's Award, American College of Medical Quality (2012).
- John M. Eisenberg Patient Safety and Quality Award for Individual Achievement (2011).
- Honorary Doctor of Letters in Medicine, Baylor College of Medicine (2003).
- Special Recognition Award, Association of American Medical Colleges (2002).
