= Incident report =

Documentation of a specific event at a health care facility

In a health care facility, such as a hospital, nursing home, or assisted living, an incident report or accident report is a form that is filled out in order to record details of an unusual event that occurs at the facility, such as an injury to a patient. The purpose of the incident report is to document the exact details of the occurrence while they are fresh in the minds of those who witnessed the event. This information may be useful in the future when dealing with liability issues stemming from the incident.

Generally, according to health care guidelines, the report must be filled out as soon as possible following the incident (but after the situation has been stabilized). This way, the details written in the report are as accurate as possible.

Most incident reports that are written involve accidents with patients, such as patient falls. But most facilities will also document an incident in which a staff member or visitor is injured.

In the event that an incident involves a patient, the patient will often be monitored for a period of time following the incident (for it may happen again), which may include taking vital signs regularly.

== Other uses ==
- Aviation accident report, an official report by a national aviation authority regarding an aviation incident or accident
- Security incident report, a report used to keep track of thefts, losses and other types of security events
- Vehicle accident report or accident report form, a report about a traffic collision. Some jurisdictions mandate each of the involved parties to file a report of the event, either separately or together.

== See also ==
- Damages
- Clinical incidents in Australia
