= Clinical incidents in Australia =

Adverse medical events in Australia

Any medical incident that causes serious harm or death will be reported as Australian Sentinel Events (SEs or ASE) which is an Australian national serious medical error or incident reporting system. It includes a set of preventable adverse events that result in serious harm or death to a patient. These events are clearly defined and recognized as being preventable if the proper safeguards are in place.

A clinical incident is defined as any event that resulted or could have resulted in minor to serious harm or death to a patient.

== History ==
In 1992, an estimated 18,000 deaths were associated with adverse events (AE) in Australia.

In 2002, all states and territories have agreed to contribute to a set of eight categories of the National Sentinel Events (NSEs). Later, a revised Australian Sentinel Events (ASE) list which includes 10 categories was endorsed by Australian Health Ministers in December 2018 .

== Regulation ==
The report of serious clinical incidents including SE are mandatory for all public hospitals and all private licensed health care facilities across Australia.

The ASE or SEs include ten categories, however different states and territories may have additional categories on the Sentinel Events.

While each state and territory have their own health department to oversee and investigate all clinical incidents, the Australian Commission on Safety and Quality in Health Care is responsible for managing all the incident happened in Australian hospitals, clinics and other communities healthcare facilities in order to improve patient safety.

== Type of incident ==
Each state and territory have their own different type of incident reporting rating system.

=== New South Wales ===
Harm Score 1 as the most severe harm including sentinel events, to Harm Score 4 as minor harm or no harm.

=== Western Australia ===
In Western Australia, Severity Assessment Codes are used in WA health systems to determine the level of a clinical incidents. Rating from SAC 1 including sentinel event as the severe harm, to SAC 3 as minor or no harm.

=== Sentinel events ===
All states and territories have agreed the 10 categories of sentinel event which include:

Type of event
Surgery or other invasive procedure performed on the wrong site resulting in serious harm or death
Surgery or other invasive procedure performed on the wrong patient resulting in serious harm or death
Wrong surgical or other invasive procedure performed on a patient resulting in serious harm or death
Unintended retention of a foreign object in a patient after surgery or other invasive procedure resulting in serious harm or death
Haemolytic blood transfusion reaction resulting from ABO incompatibility resulting in serious harm or death
Suspected suicide of a patient in an acute psychiatric unit or acute psychiatric ward
Medication error resulting in serious harm or death
Use of physical or mechanical restraint resulting in serious harm or death
Discharge of an infant or child to an unauthorised person
Use of an incorrectly positioned oro- or naso- gastric tube resulting in serious harm or death

While some state and territory may have additional category, such as in Victoria has added category 11 of "All other adverse patient safety events resulting in serious harm or death".

== Prevalence ==
Australian enjoy high-quality healthcare services and one of the best healthcare systems in the world with most incidents recorded are of minor or no harm, a very low rate of medical incidents causing significant harm to patients.

There were 54 sentinel events recorded in 2021-2022 across all Australian states and territories.

=== New South Wales ===
In 2021, New South Wales has 83,355 incidents in which 96.5% are Harm Score 3 and 4 which are minor or no harm. 0.3% are of Harm Score 1 which include about 20 sentinel events.

Most of the incidents are falls, concerning behavior and skin integrity such as pressure injuries which result in minor or no harm. About 272 cases which include sentinel events are of significant harm.

Sentinel event	2019–2020	2020–2021	2021–2022
Total Events	9	19	12

=== Victoria ===
In 2019–2020, Victoria has recorded 23 of the 10 categories of SE and an additional category has 163 SEs.

Sentinel events	2019–2020
10 categories of sentinel event	23
Additional category	163
Total SEs	186

=== Queensland ===
The table below is the sentinel events in Queensland.

sentinel event	Incidents
2015/16	15
2016/17	2

=== Western Australia ===
In 2022/23, Western Australia has recorded 35,957 incidents with 91.7% being minor or no harm, and 3.2% of moderate injury. While serious harm and death accounted for about 1% and about 3% are missing outcome/no data.

The most common causes of incidents are due to fall and unpredictable behavior.

In Western Australia, the sentinel events will be reported as SAC1 which includes the 10 categories of National Sentinel Events and Other SAC1 clinical incidents.

SAC1	2020/21	2021/22	2022/23
Sentinel Events	20	27	30
Other SCA1 clinical incidents	532	526	555

=== South Australia ===
In 2022–2023, South Australia has 78,806 incidents in which majority are minor harm or no harm. There were about 0.25–0.55 percent (about 200 cases) are of serious harm in which falls incidents and sentinel events have accounted for 157 and 5 cases respectively.

Most incidents are falls, medication and challenging behavior, fortunately most of which 99% are near miss or no harm including medication.

There are total of five sentinel event in 2021-2022 which is the same as in 2022–2023.

=== Northern Territory ===
The incidents number of sentinel events which also include the ten categories since 2019 and eight core categories before 2019 in Northern Territory.

sentinel event	Incidents
2020/21	2

== Contributing factors ==
In terms of healthcare providers, violations to procedures or guidelines, rule-based mistakes, communication errors and documentation errors are some of the most common contributing factors causing clinical incidents in Australia.

In terms of concerning patients, cognitive factors, communication and challenging behaviour are some of the common contributing factors. Most commonly caused fall incidents which usually result in minor or no harm, yet about 1% resulted in serious harm or even death.

== Efforts to improve patient safety ==
Department of Health of each state and territory; and Australian Commission on Safety and Quality in Health Care collects data of the incidents happened each year. This data collection can helps identify and recognize areas for improvement which aims to prevent similar incidents from happening again.

For example, New South Wales government has developed plans to prevent pressure injury such as keeping the head of the bed as flat as possible and if needed to elevate the bed, it must be at no more than 30-degrees.

As fall incidents often occur in healthcare facilities, government has therefore applied a knee break function preventing patient from sliding down the bed which aims to reduce fall incidents.

An other example is that in Western Australia once incident is identified, healthcare providers must take immediate action such as removing malfunction medical equipment, removing harmful substances from the environment.
