= Barcode technology in healthcare =

Barcode technology in healthcare is the use of optical machine-readable representation of data in a hospital or healthcare setting.

Dating back to the 1970s, there has been a continual effort among healthcare settings to adopt barcode technology. In the early 2000s, published reports began to illustrate high rates of medical error (adverse events) and the increasing costs of healthcare. As a result, the desire for barcoding technology in healthcare has grown as a realistic and applicable solution. Ranked first in 2007, and second in 2008 in the Annual Healthcare Information and Management Systems Society (HIMSS) Leadership Survey, HIMSS placed high priority on the use of barcoding technology to reduce medical errors and promote patient safety.

== Applications ==
Barcoding in healthcare have a variety of applications, including the following:

=== Drug Identification & Medication Management ===
In February 2004, the U.S. Food and Drug Administration (FDA) had ruled that barcodes must be used on certain human drugs. Barcodes must be linear in nature and must be readable by barcode scanners. Medication barcodes must have specified information for drug identification. Barcode information on these items must include the National Drug Code (NDC) number of the drug, an 11-character identification number for the medication. The NDC contains the name of the medication, dosage and drug company that produces the medication. Additional information that may be included in medication barcodes may include the expiration date and lot number of the medication. This is to ensure that counterfeit or expired drugs are not being administered to patients.

Medication management is a difficult task, where it focuses on the "five rights": right patient, right medication, right dose, right time, and right route of administration. Barcode medication verification at bedside allows for nurses to automatically document the administration of drugs by means of barcode scanning. A study conducted in 2010, found that barcode usage prevented about 90 000 serious medical errors each year and reduced mortality rate by 20%. One case study noted that the use of barcodes reduced medication administration error by 82% across five units studied from pre-implementation to post-implementation. Other benefits that were realized included improved nursing staff satisfaction, improved patient satisfaction, and improved community relations.

=== Specimen Collection and Blood Infusion Safety ===
Healthcare professionals use specimen testing (blood, urine, or other) to help diagnose disease, assess health, and monitor medication level. Accurate results can be yielded from error-free collection procedures. Specimens that are collected incorrectly may lead to erroneous test results, which may lead to serious consequences for patients. This may include delayed or inappropriate treatments and incorrect medication adjustments. More than 160 000 adverse medical events per year have been suspected in the United States because of misidentification of patient or laboratory specimen. Barcodes have been noted to be the strong intervention to reduce labeling errors on specimen collection, by ensuring that the correct patient is receiving the correct analysis. Barcode technologies for specimen collection have been noted to increase patient comfort, decrease possible delays in diagnosis or treatment, and decrease rework for nurse and laboratory staff. Within medical laboratories, incorporating barcoding systems has shown to be effective in reducing ID errors.

Barcoding blood and other products may allow for reduction of medical error and increase patient safety. It is important to ensure accurate identification with blood products because ID errors put patients at risk for blood incompatibility. Blood and blood components manufactured on or after April 26, 2006, must have barcode labels according to the FDA. This is used to minimize the risk of patients receiving the wrong treatment in healthcare facilities. According to the FDA, a minimum of four information pieces are required for the label, which includes the following:

- Unique identifier for the facility from where the blood is coming from;
- Lot number identifying blood donor;
- Product code; and
- Blood type (ABO, O, A and Rh).

=== Surgical Instrument Identification & Sterilization ===
Barcodes may be used to identify the instruments and supplies in kits for surgical procedures. Barcodes on instruments and surgical kits may be used to ensure compliance with surgeons' preferences for what their kits contains. Using barcodes to track what is and what is not used on a regular basis may allow for hospitals to optimize kit contents for each surgeon. This provides opportunities to reduce costs since surgeons' preferences may change over time. With the lack of updates to kit and cart contents, it may result in the purchase of supplies that are never used. Barcodes on surgical instruments can also be used to uniquely identify each instrument that is sterilized individually.

=== Patient Identification ===
Barcode technology can help prevent medical errors by making accurate and reliable information readily available at the point-of-care. Information, such as the drug identification, medication management, infusion safety, specimen collection, etc. and any other patient care activity can be easily tracked during the patient stay. Electronic barcoding ensures correct patient identification throughout the testing process, including test ordering and reporting, specimen collection, and analysis. Wristbands with barcodes that contain the information of the patient's medical record or visit number, and any other identifiers have been proven effective to provide proper patient care. In addition to wristbands, barcode scanners and printers are used to confirm patient identification.

== Barcoding Concerns ==
Economists appreciate the implementation of mature technology as barcodes. However, there are concerns with the use improper of barcoding technology in healthcare.

- From a technological standpoint, linear barcodes (1-D symbologies) have their limitations with regards to their size, memory capacity to store data, and standards that are put in place (e.g. the 11-digit National Drug Code).
- There is an escape with 2-D symbologies providing smaller barcodes for healthcare materials and tools or with a larger amount of data stored on them. As a result, there has been a lot of attention on the use of two-dimensional barcode labels.
- However, older models of barcode scanners that exist in the healthcare setting today are unable to read reduced space symbology, RSS composite, or two-dimensional symbologies.
- The simple fact is that recent models of smartphones are capable to read all known barcodes using respective applications.

Looking at barcoding technology in healthcare from a clinical professional standpoint

- Barcoding technology shall impact the workflow process positively.
- Workflow interruptions can be a result of fatigue and frustration among clinical professionals when having insufficient information technology support. * Workarounds are common with the use of many technological devices/systems. Some examples that lead to workarounds in a clinical setting as a result of barcoding technology may include (but are not limited to) adherence to outdated equipment.

The stated concerns of 2003, as e.g.

- Formalizing clinical professional autonomy to document decisions;
- Support is too slow to respond in clinical routine, especially emergencies;
- Software limits in flexibility with dosing orders;
- Sequencing the monitored medication delivery window and prioritizing other patient care activities;
- Equipment problems such as missing armbands, illegible barcodes, and others summarized as insufficient data quality

All concerns may be traced to inadequate methods or insufficient tools with a non covered demand for support by modern information technologies. Actualized decision making in 2016 for equipping the mobile work serves to overcome limitations originated from legacy equipment.

== Future of Barcoding in Healthcare ==
Given barcoding's history as a mature reliable technology, barcoding will continue to be adopted within the healthcare setting to improve the quality of patient care. However, growing attention on radio-frequency identification (RFID) systems are expected to be the future competitor for barcoding. Nevertheless, barcoding will continue to play a prominent role with RFID and will likely collaborate with RFID to form a hybrid system. In this regard, barcoding (1-D and 2-D) will continue to have advantages over RFID (specifically passive RFID) for the following two reasons:

- Barcoding is cheaper than RFID (passive RFID must lower its price to become competitive);
- Barcode technology is ideally suited for tasks in which a human being is stationary and objects are moving (e.g. blood sample collection and labeling).

Barcoding technology in healthcare will eventually begin to shift over to the use of 2-D symbologies to accommodate size restrictions and the growing need for large amounts of data. This is already becoming a reality with the use of mobile phones and is bound to play an important role in the development of mHealth.

== See also ==
- Barcode
- Bar Code Medication Administration
- Medical errors
- Patient safety
- Radio-frequency identification

=== Compliant Barcode Standards used in Healthcare ===
- Health Industry Number (HIN®) and Health Industry Bar Code
- GS1-128

==== Health Industry Bar Code Compliance ====
Basically the HIN® respectively the HIBC are coded compliant with various international joint ISO/IEC formatting standards. Especially the code structures comply with the standards defined in ISO/IEC 15418:2016 and

- the Barcode complies with the structures defined in ISO/IEC 15420:2009,
- the Codablock code complies with the structures defined in ISO/IEC 15424,
- the DataMatrix code complies with the structures defined in ISO/IEC 16022:2006,
- (the electronic UHF RFID code complies with the structures defined in ISO/IEC 18000-6:2013).

The first letter in the HIN® codes according to ISO/IEC 15418:2016 is a reserved + sign. The coding according to standard ISO/IEC 15418:2016 is subject to license fees.
