= BCMA =

BCMA may refer to:

- Bar Code Medication Administration, a barcode system designed to prevent medication errors in healthcare settings
- B-cell maturation antigen, a protein that in humans is encoded by the TNFRSF17 gene
- Doctors of BC formerly British Columbia Medical Association, a professional association of doctors in the Canadian province of British Columbia
- Branded Content Marketing Association, the global industry body in the branded content industry.
