= Emily's Law =

Ohio law regulating pharmacy technicians

Ohio State Legislature
- Full name: An Act to amend sections 3719.21, 4729.99, 4776.02, and 4776.04 and to enact section 4729.42 of the Revised Code to prohibit unauthorized pharmacy-related drug conduct relative to persons employed as pharmacy technicians.
- Introduced: December 5, 2007
- House voted: December 16, 2008 (96-1)
- Senate voted: December 17, 2008 (31-0)
- Signed into law: January 7, 2009
- Sponsor: Tim Grendell
- Governor: Ted Strickland
- Code: Ohio Revised Code
- Bill: SB 203
- Website: http://archives.legislature.state.oh.us/bills.cfm?ID=127_SB_203

Status: Current legislation

Emily's Law (Emily's Act) is an informal name given to Ohio Senate Bill 203 (SB 203), which was signed into law in 2009. The law is named in honor of Emily Jerry, a two-year-old who died in 2006 from a medication error during her last round of chemotherapy at Rainbow Babies and Children's Hospital in Cleveland, Ohio. The law: "require(s) that pharmacy technicians be at least 18 years of age, register with the State Board of Pharmacy and pass a Board-approved competency exam; the legislation also includes specific provisions related to technician training/education, criminal records and approved disciplinary actions." Previously, "people with only a high school degree could walk into a job as a technician at a major hospital and begin working on medications with minimal training."

== History ==
On February 26, 2006, Emily Jerry was undergoing her last scheduled round of chemotherapy with Etoposide to treat a yolk sac tumor which was diagnosed 6 months earlier. According to physicians responsible for her care, her prognosis was "excellent" and she was expected to be medically discharged following the completion of her last infusion. The pharmacy where Emily was receiving her care was short staffed due to being a weekend, and the pharmacy computer system was down for maintenance. Furthermore, Emily's chemotherapy was entered incorrectly as a stat order, and the pharmacist and technician were behind on other hospital orders and unable to take their scheduled lunch break.

Etoposide is traditionally injected into a pre-prepared isotonic 0.9% sodium chloride intravenous bag (IV) for dilution prior to administration. However, the pharmacy technician incorrectly filled an empty IV bag with hypertonic 23.4% sodium chloride, then added the Etoposide resulting in a solution containing 26 times more sodium chloride than was recommended. After compounding the incorrect medication the IV was given to a pharmacist for sign-off, who failed to detect the medication error, and it was dispensed to hospital staff for administration. Upon administration Emily grabbed her head, cried out in pain, began vomiting, and slipped into a coma – she died three days later on March 1, 2006 after being taken off life support.

The pharmacist, Eric Cropp, was terminated from Rainbow Babies and Children's Hospital on March 3, 2006, later stripped of his license by the Ohio Board of Pharmacy, and indicted for reckless homicide and involuntary manslaughter by an Ohio grand jury. On May 13, 2009 as a result of a plea bargain, Cropp pleaded no contest to involuntary manslaughter in exchange for dismissal of the charge of reckless homicide. Eric Cropp was sentenced to six months in prison, six months of house arrest, 400 hours of community service, and $5000 in court costs.

== Legislation ==
Senate Bill 203 was introduced in the Ohio State Senate in 2008 and signed into law January 7, 2009, by Governor Ted Strickland. It amended sections 3719.21, 4729.99, 4776.02, and 4776.04 in addition to enacting section 4729.42 of the Ohio Revised Code.

== Controversy ==
Some pharmacy trade groups contest that Cuyahoga County, the State of Ohio, and the Ohio Board of Pharmacy took excessive action against the supervising pharmacist. They contest that making Cropp out to be a pariah discourages pharmacists and hospitals to report medication-related errors, and actually increases the chances for patient harm.
