= NPS MedicineWise =

Australian not-for-profit organization (1997–2022)

- Formation: March 1997; 29 years ago
- Dissolved: December 2022; 3 years ago
- Type: Not-for-profit
- Purpose: Medicine education and quality use of medicines programs
- Headquarters: Sydney, Australia
- Region served: Australia
- Products: NPS MedicineWise; Australian Prescriber; Choosing Wisely
- Method: Educational programs and professional development, public campaigns, publications
- Staff: 210
- Website: nps.org.au
- Formerly called: National Prescribing Service

NPS MedicineWise, previously the National Prescribing Service (NPS), was an Australian not-for-profit prescribing and pharmaceutical information service. The NPS was founded in March 1998 and funded by the federal Department of Health and Aged Care under the Quality Use of Medicines (QUM) grant. It provided practical tools, education programs, and evidence-based drug and therapeutics information to clinicians and patients, with the intention of improving the way health technologies, including how medicines and medical tests, are prescribed and used.

In March 2022, the Department of Health and Aged Care announced a plan to withdraw QUM funding of NPS MedicineWise as part of redesigning the QUM program and National Medicines Policy. The controversial decision resulted in NPS MedicineWise resources being handed over to the Australian Commission on Safety and Quality in Health Care, and related programs such as the Australian Prescriber journal and Choosing Wisely being externalised.

== Overview ==
NPS MedicineWise was founded in 1998 as part of an Australian Government shift in health policy to address issues around Quality Use of Medicines (QUM). NPS MedicineWise' initial mandate was to reduce the cost of medicines to Australia's Pharmaceutical Benefits Scheme (PBS) by providing clinically reviewed independent information about medicines to doctors, pharmacists, and other health professionals. Many of these materials relate to new drugs or more complex grey areas in the prescription process.

Since 2003, NPS MedicineWise has assumed a secondary mandate: promoting discussion of basic medicine-related issues in the community via consumer education programs and major award-winning campaigns, including Be Medicinewise Week, launched in January 2011. The campaign has been broadcast across a wide spectrum of media channels and addressed common health issues such as lower back pain, antibiotics, and the active ingredient of medicines.

Although NPS MedicineWise has brought wide-ranging savings to the Australian health system, critics have questioned the actual causes and ramifications of such savings. However, the savings reported by the organization are comprehensively evaluated and accepted by the government, demonstrating a clear correlation between NPS MedicineWise programs and improved prescribing.

== Historical success ==
In the period between 1998 and 2004, 90% of all GPs were actively involved in one or more educational activities run by NPS MedicineWise, while approximately sixty percent of GPs and pharmacists rated its printed educational materials as good or very good.

NPS MedicineWise's activities have generated substantial financial savings for PBS, with the organization claiming that its information and education campaigns have reduced unnecessary prescriptions and improved prescribing decisions within the medical community. Various health professionals argue that, despite potential conflicts between cost-saving and the organization's Quality Use of Medicines mandate, NPS Medicinewise will continue to improve on the current PBS system.

NPS MedicineWise has also developed programs and resources to help consumers and health practitioners discuss health issues and improve the QUM within Australia.

== Events ==
=== National Medicines Symposium (NMS) ===
NMS a biennial conference that served as a national forum for stakeholders to address quality use of medicines and health policy. Following the dissolution of NPS MedicineWise in December 2022, custodianship of the symposium transferred to the Australian Commission on Safety and Quality in Health Care.
