= Fatal Care =

Book by Sanjaya Kumar

Fatal Care: Survive in the U.S. Health System
- 1st ed. cover
- Author: Sanjaya Kumar, Maryland, M.Sc., MPH
- Cover artist: Zach Morell (design)
- Language: English
- Subject: Non-fiction
- Publisher: IGI Publishing
- Publication date: April 21, 2008 (hardcover)
- Publication place: United States
- Pages: 290
- ISBN: 978-0-9777121-1-3
- OCLC: 191732370
- Dewey Decimal: 610 22
- LC Class: R729.8 .K86 2008

Fatal Care: Survive in the U.S. Health System is a book about preventable medical errors written by Sanjaya Kumar, president and chief medical officer of Quantros, Milpitas, California. Fatal Care was published in April 2008 by IGI Publishing, Minneapolis, Minnesota.

Fatal Care: Survive in the U.S. Health System describes the impact of preventable medical errors on thirteen families. Topics covered include: heparin overdose, misdiagnosis, hospital-acquired infection, patient-controlled analgesia (PCA) pump, medically induced trauma, inadequate emergency department care, and wrong site surgery. Fatal Care identifies gaps in the health care system based on documented factual information and analysis for health care consumers and professionals

According to Institute of Medicine (IOM) and Institute for Healthcare Improvement (IHI), as many as 98,000 patient deaths occur each year in U.S. healthcare facilities as a result of preventable medical errors. Also, IOM and IHI report preventable medical errors impact at least five million Americans annually, costing more than $17–21 billion.

Well-publicized preventable medical error cases involve celebrities Dennis Quaid, Terry Francona and Charlie Weis.

== See also ==
- Diagnosis
- Medical ethics
- The Deadly Dinner Party
- How Doctors Think
- To Err is Human
