= Sentinel event =

American healthcare

A sentinel event is "any unanticipated event in a healthcare setting that results in death or serious physical or psychological injury to a patient, not related to the natural course of the patient's illness". Sentinel events can be caused by major mistakes and negligence on the part of a healthcare provider, and are closely investigated by healthcare regulatory authorities. Sentinel events are identified under The Joint Commission (TJC) accreditation policies to help aid in root cause analysis and to assist in development of preventive measures. The Joint Commission tracks events in a database to ensure events are adequately analyzed, and that undesirable trends or decreases in performance are caught early and mitigated.

== Specific events requiring review ==
Sentinel events include "unexpected occurrences involving death or serious physical or psychological injury, or the risk thereof". They also include the following, even if death or major loss of function did not occur:

- Infant abduction
- Release of an infant to an incorrect family
- Unexpected death of an infant not born prematurely
- Severe neonatal jaundice
- Surgery mistakes (wrong body part, wrong individual)
- Objects left in a patient after surgery
- Rape at a healthcare facility
- Suicide at a healthcare facility, or within 72 hours of departure
- Receiving a blood transfusion of the wrong blood type
- Radiation therapy to the wrong part of the body
- Radiation therapy 25% or more above the planned dose
- Any radiation dose over 15 Gy or resulting in permanent soft tissue damage (ie. skin or organ necrosis).

In addition to the list above, The Joint Commission requires each accredited organization to define sentinel events for its own care system and put into place monitoring procedures to detect these events and a procedure for root cause analysis.

Main Sentinel Events reported to the Joint Commission in 2015
| Type of event | Number of events |
|---|---|
| Unintended Retention of a Foreign Body | 123(13.14%) |
| Wrong–patient, wrong-site, wrong-procedure | 121(12.93%) |
| Suicide | 98(10.47%) |
| Fall | 95(10.15%) |
| Delay In Treatment | 82(8.76%) |
| Op/Post-op Complication | 82(8.76%) |

== Actions and reporting ==
Participation is necessary by the leadership of TJC accredited healthcare organizations and by the persons closely involved in the systems under review. Causal factors are analyzed, focusing on systems and processes, not individual performance. Potential improvements, called an "action plan", are identified and implemented to decrease the likelihood of such events in the future. Each accredited organization is encouraged, but not required, to report any sentinel event to The Joint Commission. However, the organization is expected to prepare a root cause analysis and action plan within 45 calendar days of the event. In addition, healthcare organizations are required to notify the Food and Drug Administration (FDA) and device manufacturers within 10 days of a sentinel event caused by a medical device, according to the Safe Medical Device Act of 1990. Statistics of sentinel events are recorded and published by the FDA's MedWatch program.

Advantages of reporting sentinel events to The Joint Commission are:

- Adding to the database with dissemination to other health care facilities, preventing other adverse events.
- Consultation with The Joint Commission on implementing the root cause analysis and action plan.
- Association with national accrediting body reassures the public that all steps are being taken to prevent a recurrence.

== Joint Commission actions ==
After review of the accredited facility's report on the sentinel event, The Joint Commission issues an Official Accreditation Decision Report that may modify the organization's current accreditation status, assign an appropriate "measure of success", or a require follow-up survey within six months. A healthcare facility that fails to complete a root cause analysis of the sentinel event and action plan within the time frame can be placed on "Accreditation Watch" by the Joint Commission, a status that can be publicly disclosed. The Joint Commission disseminates "sentinel event alerts" identifying specific sentinel events, their underlying causes, and steps to prevent recurrence.

Further nursing research is ongoing at a number of "magnet" hospitals in the United States, especially to reduce the number of patient falls that may lead to sentinel events.

== See also ==
- Hospital-acquired condition
- Never event
