= The Deadly Dinner Party =

2009 nonfiction book by Jonathan A. Edlow

The Deadly Dinner Party and Other Medical Detective Stories
- Author: Jonathan A. Edlow
- Language: English
- Genre: Non-fiction
- Publisher: Yale University Press
- Publication date: 2009
- Publication place: United States
- ISBN: 978-0-300-12558-0

The Deadly Dinner Party and Other Medical Detective Stories (2009, ISBN 978-0-300-12558-0) is a nonfiction book by Jonathan A. Edlow, MD about medical mysteries.

The book contains fifteen real-life stories of everyday people caught up in medical crises that take deduction and detective work to solve, and to determine a correct diagnosis. The book has been compared to the "medical mystery" books of Berton Roueché. The book is published by Yale University Press.

== Reception ==
In a review for New Scientist, Druin Burch wrote that the "collection of bite-sized essays about obscure infections, poisons and diseases […] make an enjoyable and interesting book. The stories don’t flow, but they do add up to more than a list of anecdotes […]."

In The New York Review of Books, Jerome Groopman described how Edlow wrote in "clear and fluid prose" about unusual diagnoses and the ultimate need for a "discerning doctor".

== See also ==
- Diagnosis
- Medical ethics
- How Doctors Think
- Fatal Care: Survive in the U.S. Health System
