= Rainbow Babies & Children's Hospital =

UH Rainbow Babies & Children's Hospital

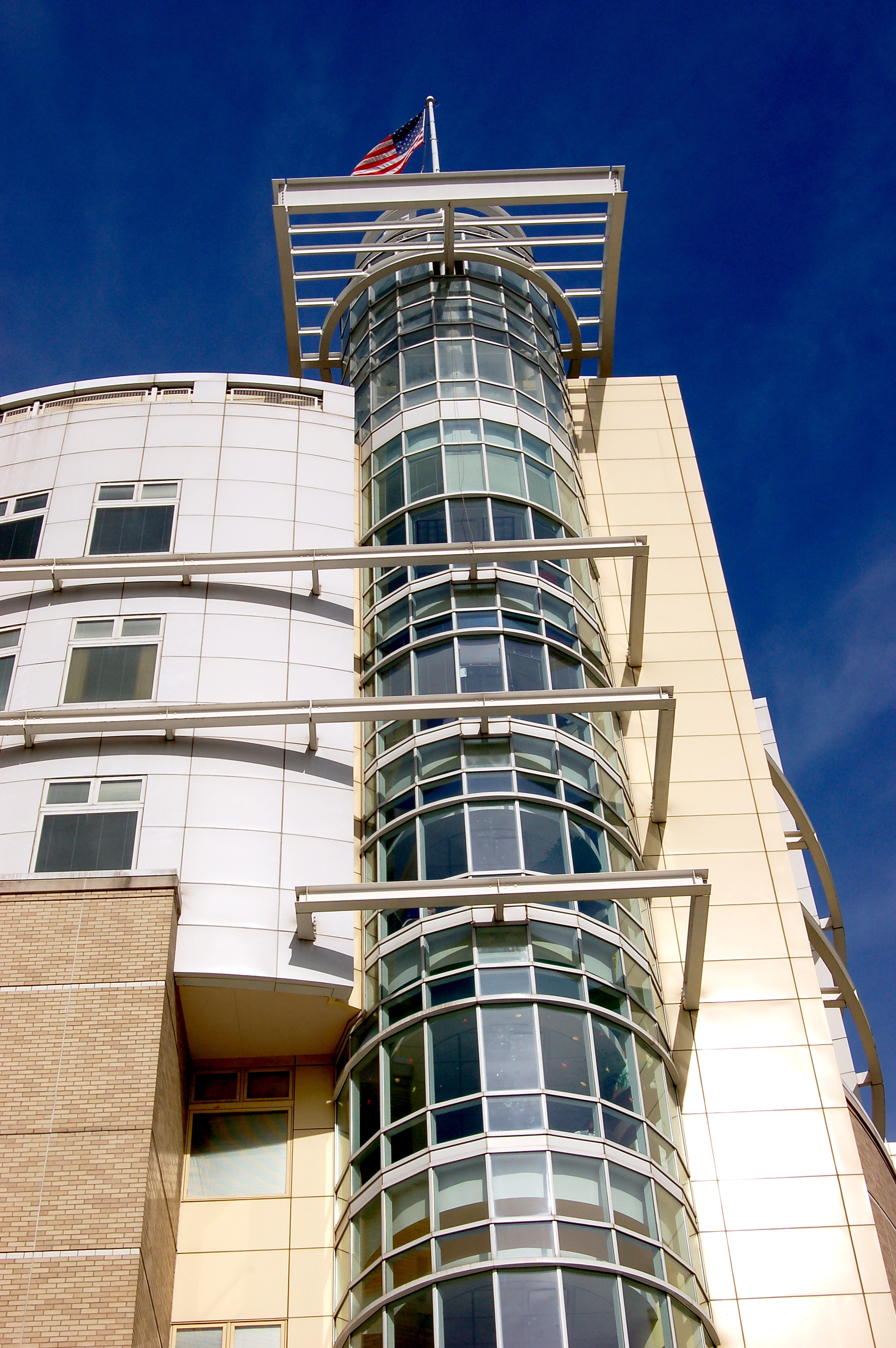

Geography
- Location: Cleveland, Ohio, United States
- Coordinates: 41°30′16″N 81°36′21″W

Organization
- Care system: Medicaid, Private Insurance, BCMH
- Type: Teaching
- Affiliated university: Case Western Reserve University School of Medicine

Services
- Emergency department: Level I pediatric trauma center
- Beds: 244
- Speciality: Pediatrics

History
- Opened: 1887

Links
- Website: www.uhhospitals.org/rainbow
- Lists: Hospitals in Ohio

Rainbow Babies & Children's Hospital is a pediatric acute care children's teaching hospital located in Cleveland, Ohio. It is affiliated with Case Western Reserve University School of Medicine and has a neonatal intensive care unit (NICU), pediatric intensive care unit (PICU), and level 1 pediatric trauma center.

== About ==
The hospital has 244 pediatric beds and is affiliated with Case Western Reserve University School of Medicine. The hospital is a member hospital of University Hospitals and is the only children's hospital in the network. The hospital provides comprehensive pediatric specialties and subspecialties to infants, children, teens, and young adults aged 0–21 throughout northern Ohio. Rainbow Babies & Children's Hospital also sometimes treats adults that require pediatric care. Rainbow Babies & Children's Hospital also features the only ACS verified level 1 pediatric trauma center in the region. The hospital is one of the largest providers of pediatric health services in Ohio. The hospital is attached to University Hospitals Cleveland Medical Center and a few blocks away from the Ronald McDonald House of Cleveland.

Rainbow Babies & Children's Hospital regularly conducts clinical trials in the treatment of pediatric health disorders including pediatric oncology, depression and lupus. It also offers services for medical professionals, including residency and fellowship programs, continuing medical education, a nursing program, and the Rainbow Center for Pediatric Ethics.

It treats children with cancer, heart disease, cystic fibrosis and pulmonary specialties, sickle cell disease, kidney disease, immunology and endocrine and metabolic disorders. Its neonatologists specialize in the treatment of high-risk and premature newborns.

== Facilities ==
=== NICU ===
Rainbow's neonatal intensive care unit (NICU) cares for more than 1,300 premature and critically ill infants each year. The National Institutes of Health (NIH) have designated it as a level IV Neonatal Research Center – the highest available designation.

In 2009 the NICU completed a renovation and expansion. The 38-bed NICU now connects to a 44-bed neonatal transitional unit on the same floor, several feet away from the delivery rooms at MacDonald Women's Hospital. Improvements include more bedside privacy for parents, an increase in the number of diagnostic and imaging equipment, and the ability to provide extracorporeal membrane oxygenation (ECMO) treatment without transporting the baby.

=== PICU ===
Rainbow's pediatric intensive care unit (PICU) is a 23-bed combined medical-surgical unit which cares for more than 1500 critically ill children each year. An attending intensivist from the Division of Pediatric Critical Care coordinates care, in cooperation with children's primary pediatricians as well as medical and surgical subspecialists.

== Awards ==
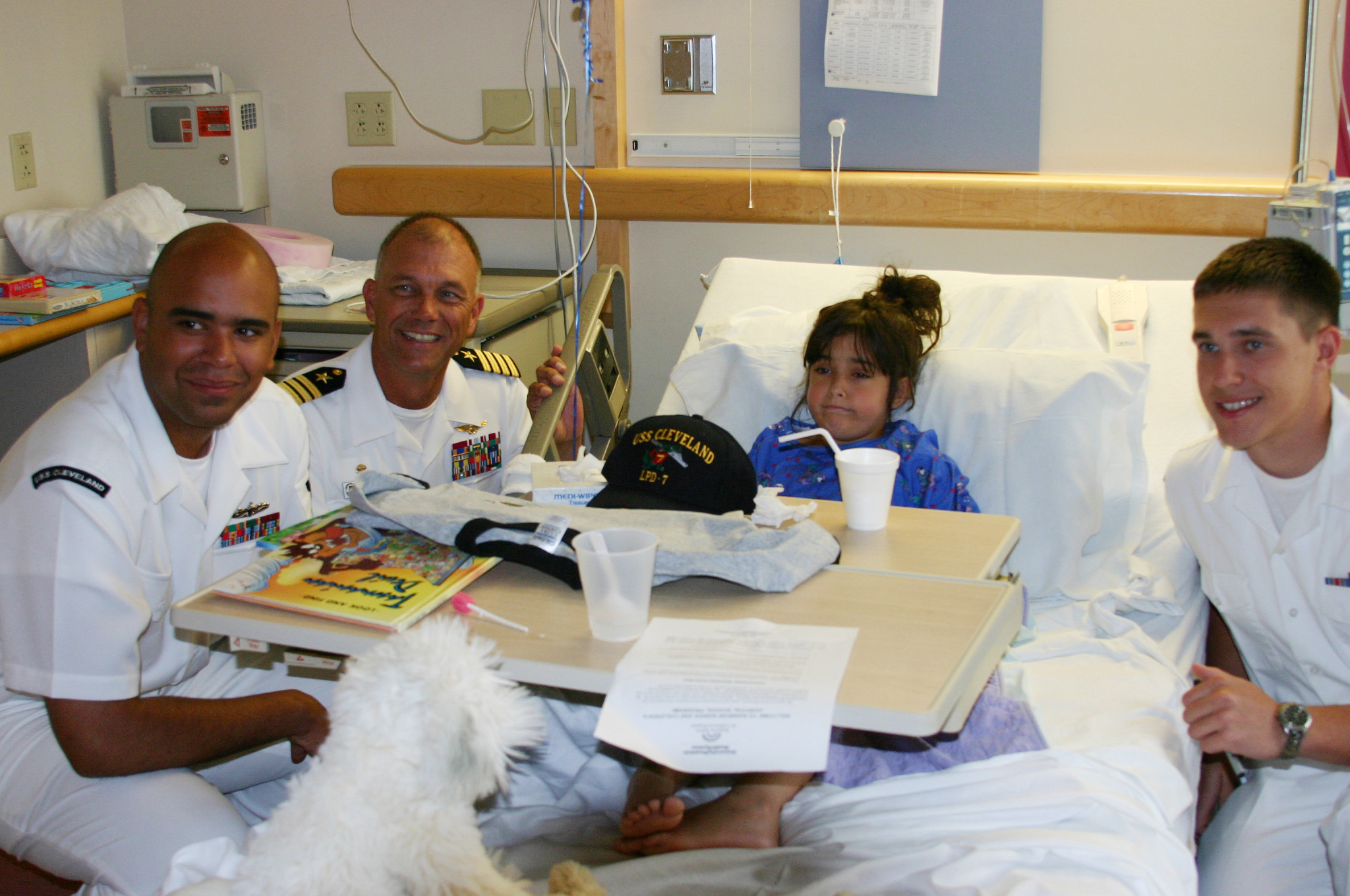
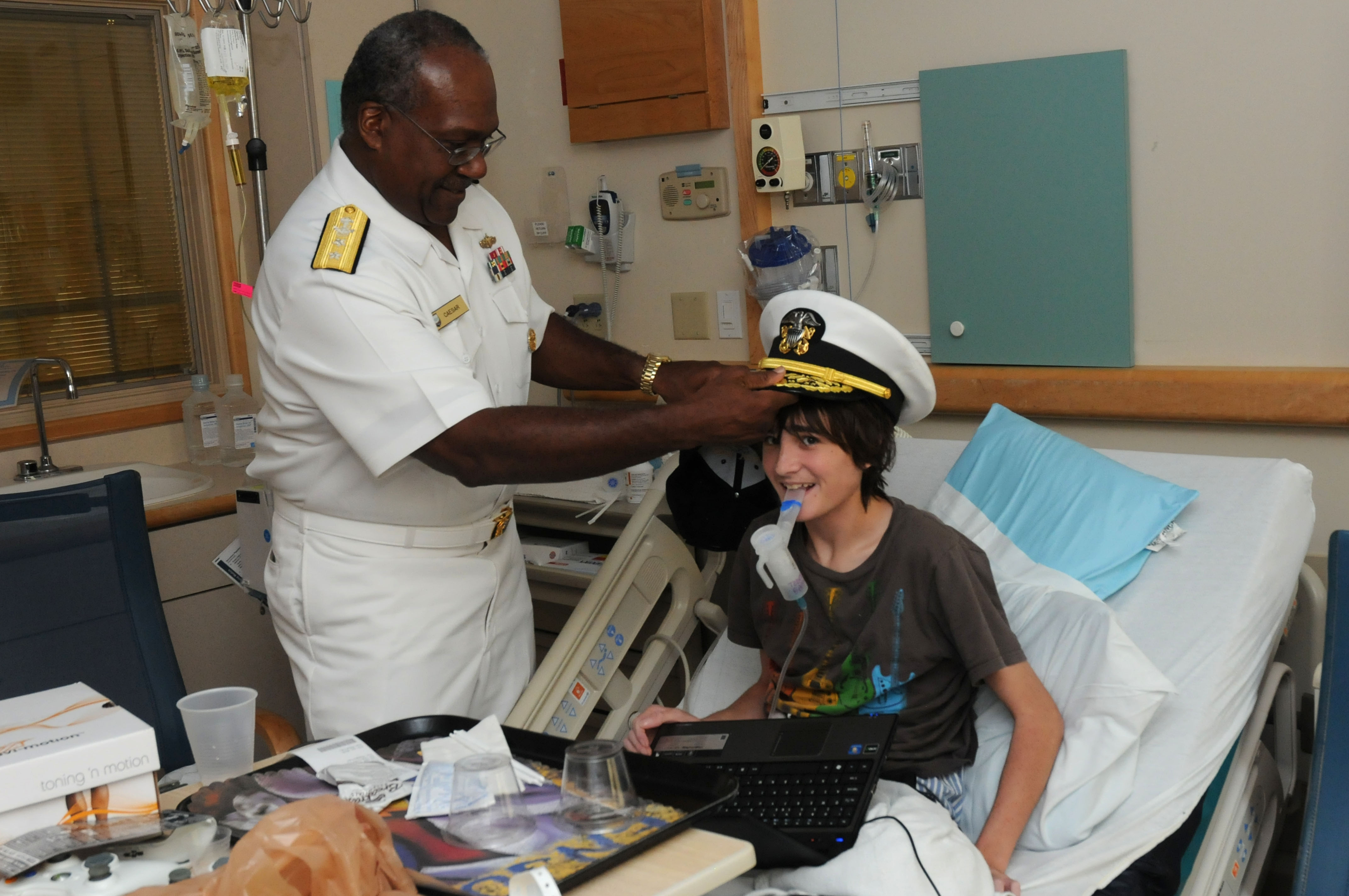
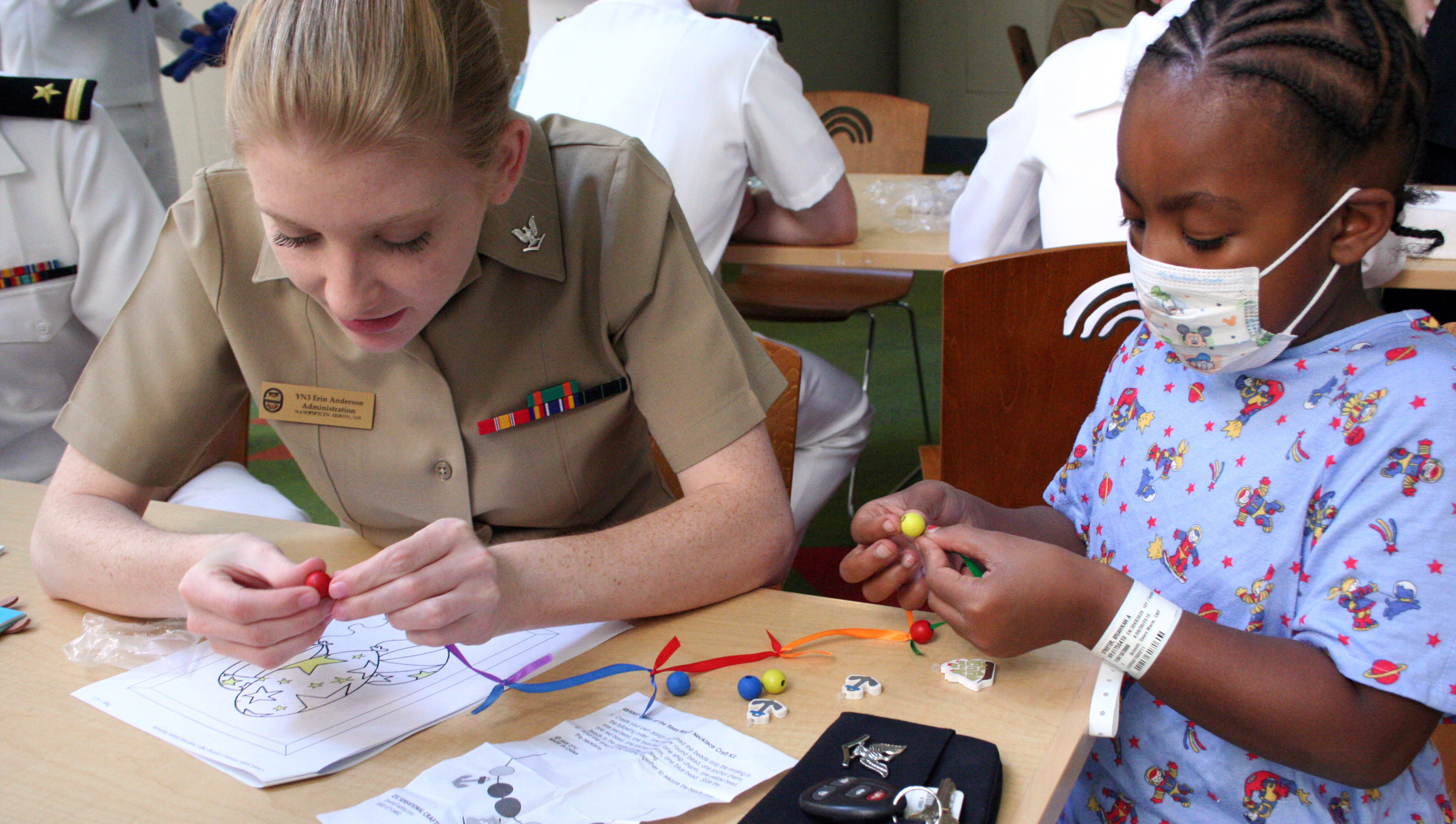
U.S. Navy personnel visiting with patients

In 2015–16, Rainbow ranked #3 for neonatal care, #11 for pulmonology, #8 for orthopedics, #22 for neurology, #29 for nephrology, #50 for gastroenterology, #19 for oncology, and #47 for urology in the U.S. News & World Report rankings of pediatric hospitals.

As of 2020 Rainbow Babies & Children's Hospital has placed nationally in 7 ranked pediatric specialties on U.S. News & World Report.

U.S. News & World Report Rankings for Rainbow Babies & Children's Hospital
Specialty	Rank (In the U.S.)	Score (Out of 100)
Neonatology	#7	82.2
Pediatric Cancer	#37	74.5
Pediatric Diabetes & Endocrinology	#31	69.4
Pediatric Gastroenterology & GI Surgery	#40	65.1
Pediatric Orthopedics	#11	82.6
Pediatric Pulmonology & Lung Surgery	#14	75.9
Pediatric Urology	#32	69.5

== See also ==
- University Hospitals
- List of children's hospitals in the United States
- Emily's Law
