= How Doctors Think =

2007 book by Jerome Groopman

- Author: Jerome Groopman
- Language: English
- Genre: Non-fiction
- Publisher: Houghton Mifflin
- Publication date: 2007
- Publication place: United States
- Media type: Hardback
- Pages: 305 pp (first edition, hardback)
- ISBN: 0-618-61003-0 (first edition, hardback)
- OCLC: 74569241
- Dewey Decimal: 610 22
- LC Class: R723.5 .G75 2007
- Preceded by: Anatomy of Hope
- Followed by: Your Medical Mind

How Doctors Think is a book released in March 2007 by Jerome Groopman, the Dina and Raphael Recanati Chair of Medicine at Harvard Medical School, chief of experimental medicine at Beth Israel Deaconess Medical Center in Boston, and staff writer for The New Yorker magazine.

The book opens with a discussion of a woman in her thirties who suffered daily stomach cramps and serious weight loss, and who visited some 30 doctors over a period of 15 years. Several misdiagnoses were made before she was finally found to have celiac disease. Groopman explains that no one can expect a physician to be infallible, as medicine is an uncertain science, and every doctor sometimes makes mistakes in diagnosis and treatment. But the frequency and seriousness of those mistakes can be reduced by "understanding how a doctor thinks and how he or she can think better".

The book includes Groopman's own experiences both as an oncologist and as a patient, as well as interviews by Groopman of prominent physicians in the medical community. Notably, he describes his difficulties with a number of orthopedic surgeons as he sought treatment for a debilitating ligament laxity he developed in his right hand, which over several years had led to the formation of cysts in the bones of his wrist.

== Salem's challenge ==
Groopman spends a great deal of the book discussing the challenge posed to him by Dr. Deeb Salem, chairman of the Department of Internal Medicine at Tufts-New England Medical Center, during a presentation the author made at their hospital grand rounds. During the presentation, Groopman was discussing the importance of compassion and communication in providing medical care when Salem posed the following question:

There are primary care physicians in every hospital who speak with great sensitivity and concern, and their longtime patients love them, but clinically they are incompetent--how is a patient to know this?

At the time of the presentation, Groopman was unable to provide a satisfactory response. Salem's question reminded Groopman of his experiences with physicians at the Phillips House of the world-renowned Massachusetts General Hospital, where he trained as a resident in the 1970s. Per his account:

A few of [the physicians at Philips House] were highly skilled, but several were, at best, marginal in their clinical acumen. Nonetheless, their patients were devoted to them. It was the job of the residents to plug the holes in these marginal doctors' care. Just as a physician has to be wary of his first impression of a patient's condition, as a patient you have to be careful of your first impression of a physician...Thankfully, fewer students are admitted to medical school now because of social standing and family connections than at the time of my training. America has become more of a meritocracy in the professions. Medical school admissions committees no longer accept a record of gentlemen's C's at an Ivy League college.

At best, I said to Salem, a layman should inquire of friends and, if possible, other physicians as well as nurses about the clinical qualities of a doctor beyond his personality. His credentials can be found on the Internet or by contacting a local medical board...Salem's query required a much more comprehensive answer, which I hope this book will help provide.

== The availability heuristic ==
Early in the work, Groopman discusses the work of Amos Tversky and Nobel laureate Daniel Kahneman, psychologists from Hebrew University in Jerusalem. Specifically, he explores their development in the early 1980s of a concept known as the availability heuristic.

In the theory, "availability" is defined as the tendency to judge the likelihood of explanation for an event by the ease with which relevant examples come to mind. In a clinical situation a diagnosis may be made because the physician often sees similar cases in their practice — for example, the misclassification of aspirin toxicity as a viral pneumonia, or the improper recognition of an essential tremor as delirium tremens due to alcohol withdrawal in an indigent urban setting. Groopman argues that clinicians will misattribute a general symptom as specific to a certain disease based on the frequency they encounter that disease in their practice.

Kahneman won the Nobel Prize in economics in 2002 for his work on heuristics, an honor that Groopman believes Tversky would have shared had he not died in 1996.

== Lack of recognition for gatekeepers ==
Groopman also serves as an advocate for primary care physicians in his book. He argues that gatekeeper physicians are underreimbursed for their work, believing this to be a legacy of the period earlier this century when surgeons headed the medical societies that negotiated with insurers about what a 'customary' payment for services was to be.

He suggests that the poor reimbursement and lack of recognition for primary care physicians is fundamentally flawed. He quotes Dr. Eric J. Cassell's book, Doctoring: The Nature of Primary Care Medicine, to defend his assertion:

A common error in thinking about primary care is to see it as entry-level medicine...and, because of this, rudimentary medicine...This is a false notion. One should not confuse highly technical, even complicated, medical knowledge--special practical knowledge about an unusual disease, treatment, condition, or technology--with the complex, many-sided worldly-wise knowledge we expect of the best physicians.

The narrowest subspecialist, the reasoning goes, should also be able to provide this [broad] range of medical services. This naive idea arises, as do so many other wrong beliefs about primary care, because of the concept that doctors take care of diseases. Diseases, the idea goes on, form a hierarchy from simple to difficult. Specialists take care of difficult diseases, so, of course, they will naturally do a good job on simple diseases. Wrong. Doctors take care of people, some of whom have diseases and all of whom have some problem. People used to doing complicated things usually do complicated things in simple situations--for example, ordering tests or x-rays when waiting a few days might suffice--thus overtreating people with simple illnesses and overlooking the clues about other problems that might have brought the patient to the doctor.

== The fallacy of logic ==
In a later chapter Groopman reports a frank discussion with Dr. James E. Lock, chief of cardiology at Boston Children's Hospital. During their conversation, Groopman asks the world-renowned cardiologist about the times in his career when he made mistakes in patient treatment.

To the query, Lock gives the cryptic response, "All my mistakes have the same things in common."

Lock then elaborates, discussing recommendations he made to repair specific heart defects in neonates that ultimately led to worse clinical outcomes and potentially avoidable deaths. The recommendations he made were based on a purely logical understanding of cardiac physiology. The crucial point of Lock's discussion came with his confession:

Impeccable logic doesn't always suffice. My mistake was that I reasoned from first principles when there was no prior experience. I turned out to be wrong because there are variables that you can't factor in until you actually do it. And you make the wrong recommendation, and the patient doesn't survive. I didn't leave enough room for what seems [sic] like minor effects--the small fluctuations in oxygen levels, which might amount to one or two or three percent but actually can signal major problems in the heart....[The proposed treatment] is very sound logic. But it's wrong...These children developed right heart failure and clinically they became worse. There are aspects to human biology and human physiology that you just can't predict. Deductive reasoning doesn't work for every case. Sherlock Holmes is a model detective, but human biology is not a theft or a murder where all the cues can add up neatly.

Groopman goes on to write, "Lock averted his gaze and his face fell; to be wrong about a child is a form of suffering unique to his profession [as a pediatrician]."

== Disregard of uncertainty ==
Groopman also discusses the work of Renee Fox, a physician and occupational sociologist who observed residents and attendings in a hospital ward setting, noting their various ways of coping with the uncertainties of medical treatment. The mechanisms to cope that Fox observed included, for example, black humor, making bets about who would be right about a patient's prognosis, and engaging in magical thinking to maintain a sense of poise and competence in front of patients while performing circumspect procedures.

Jay Katz, a clinical instructor at Yale Law School has since termed these coping mechanisms under the rubric 'disregard of uncertainty', which he believes physicians develop to deal with the anxiety of shifting from the certainty of theoretical discussions of medicine early in their training to its more happenstance practical application.

Groopman recalls that in situations where he had been hesitant to take clinical action based on incomplete data, it had been wisest at times to follow the advice of his mentor Dr. Linda A. Lewis: "Don't just do something, stand there." Groopman asserts that there exist situations in which inaction may be the wisest course of action.

== Suggestions for patients ==
Groopman closes with an epilogue giving advice for patients. He gives the following tools that patients can use to help reduce or rectify cognitive errors:

- Ask What else could it be?, combating satisfaction of search bias and leading the doctor to consider a broader range of possibilities.
- Ask Is there anything that doesn't fit?, combatting confirmation bias and again leading the doctor to think broadly.
- Ask Is it possible I have more than one problem?, because multiple simultaneous disorders do exist and frequently cause confusing symptoms.
- Tell what you are most worried about, opening discussion and leading either to reassurance (if the worry is unlikely) or careful analysis (if the worry is plausible).
- Retell the story from the beginning. Details that were omitted in the initial telling may be recalled, or different wording or the different context may make clues more salient. (This is most appropriate when the condition has not responded to treatment or there is other reason to believe that a misdiagnosis is possible.)

== See also ==
- Availability heuristic
- Diagnosis
- Medical ethics
- The Deadly Dinner Party
- Fatal Care: Survive in the U.S. Health System
- To Err is Human
