= Australian Commission on Safety and Quality in Health Care =

Health care quality agency

Commission overview
- Formed: 1 January 2011
- Jurisdiction: Australian Government
- Headquarters: Sydney
- Employees: 81 (2022)
- Annual budget: A$30.6 million
- Minister responsible: Mark Butler, Minister for Health and Aged Care
- Commission executives: Christine Kilpatrick, Chair; Anne Duggan, Chief Executive Officer
- Parent department: Department of Health, Disability and Ageing
- Key document: National Health Reform Act 2011
- Website: safetyandquality.gov.au

The Australian Commission on Safety and Quality in Health Care (ACSQHC) is the national health care standards agency for all health services, general practices, pathology and medical imaging providers in Australia. The commission is part of the Health, Disability and Ageing portfolio of the federal government, which is accountable to the minister for health, currently Mark Butler.

The commission is jointly funded by the Australian Government, and state and territory governments.

== National standards ==
The commission was first formed in 2006 and formalised in 2011 to delivery programs to improve health care received in Australia, primarily in the form of standards. The commission has developed national care standards for all health services (National Safety and Quality Health Service Standards), as well as more specific standards for general practices and allied health (Primary and Community Healthcare Standards), mental health services (Mental Health Standards for Community Managed Organisations), and clinical care delivered in aged care settings (Aged Care Quality Standards).

The commission also develops and oversees two mandatory accreditation schemes for medical imaging services and pathology services, and is involved in the national digital mental health standards and the cosmetic surgery reform efforts.

== National Safety and Quality Health Service Standards ==
The National Safety and Quality Health Service Standards (NSQHS Standards) are Australia's principal health care standards, and apply to all health services including inpatient, outpatient, and community care. There are 8 standards:

1. Clinical governance
2. Partnering with consumers
3. Preventing and controlling infections
4. Medication safety
5. Comprehensive care
6. Communicating for safety
7. Blood management
8. Recognising and responding to acute deterioration

Within each standard are a sub-set of rules and expectations. Health services are required to be assessed by an independent accreditor against these standards, and cannot deliver services without accreditation in most circumstances.

=== Australian Health Service Safety and Quality Accreditation Scheme ===
The Australian Health Service Safety and Quality Accreditation Scheme (AHSSQA) Scheme operationalises the standards by way of mandatory inspections, accreditation and reporting of health services in each state and territory. Independent organisations can apply to the commission to be an approved accrediting agency, and complete accreditations when engaged by health services as required. Services must receive initial accreditation to begin services, and receive full accreditation within 18 months. They will then be reaccredited at least once every three years.

From 1 July 2023, short notice assessment began which reduced the notice period for hospitals, day procedure facilities and publicly funded or contracted community services to 24 hours.

== Programs ==
Alongside the national standards, ACSQHC also oversees a number of specific health care improvement programs. These include:

- Australia's quality use of medicines (QUM) program, including antimicrobial stewardship
- health care-related infection prevention and management efforts, including the National Hand Hygiene Initiative
- clinical trial safety and reporting programs

These programs all broadly sit under one specific NSQHS Standard.

== See also ==
- NPS MedicineWise
- Department of Health, Disability and Ageing
