= Retained surgical instruments =

Item left in a patient's body after surgery

A retained surgical instrument is any item inadvertently left behind in a patient’s body in the course of surgery. There are few books about it and it is thought to be underreported. As a preventable medical error, it occurs more frequently than "wrong site" surgery. The consequences of retained surgical tools include injury, repeated surgery, excess monetary cost, loss of hospital credibility and in some cases the death of the patient.

== Mistakes and consequences ==
In any given typical surgery, an estimated 250–300 surgical tools are used. The number significantly increases to 600 when a larger surgery is performed, thus increasing the chance of the surgeon losing an instrument.

=== Types of forgotten instruments ===
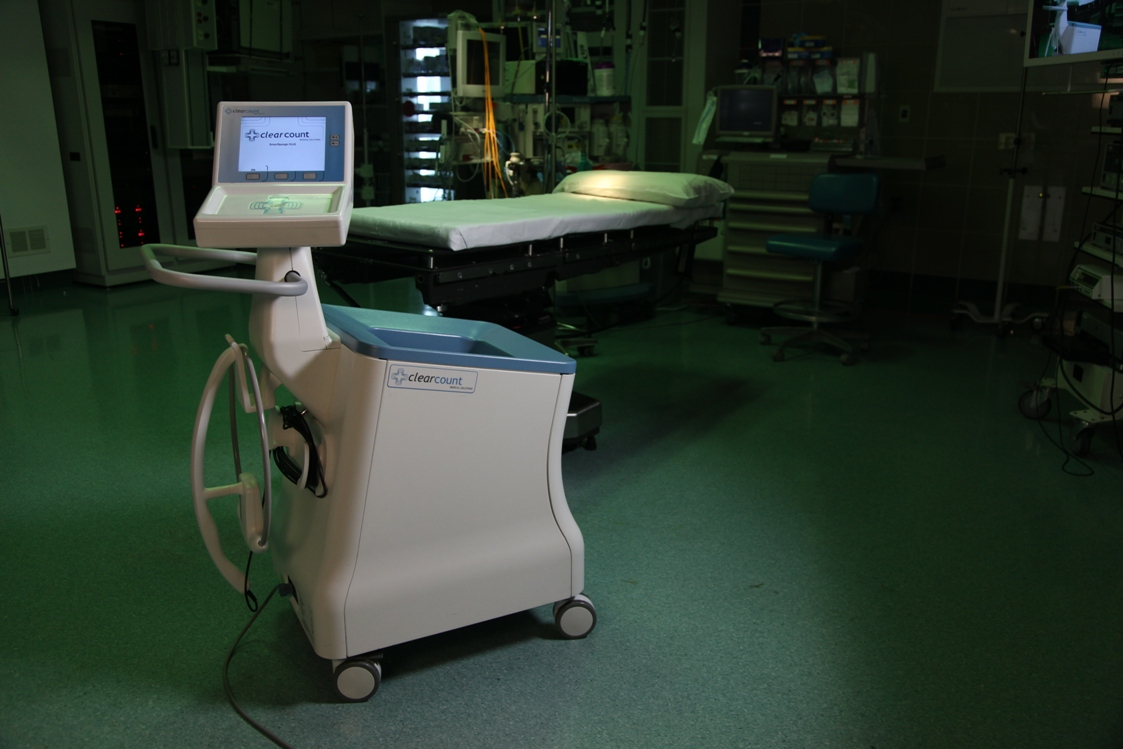
SmartSponge system, an RFID system to aid doctors in tracking sponges and other surgical items during surgery

There are many different types of tools that have been left behind during a surgery. Common instruments are needles, knife blades, safety pins, scalpels, clamps, scissors, sponges, towels, and electrosurgical adapters. Also retained are tweezers, forceps, suction tips and tubes, scopes, ultrasound tissue disruptors, asepto bulbs, cryotomes and cutting laser guides, and measuring devices. The single most common left behind object is a sponge.

=== Frequency ===
The estimate of how often this type of mistake happens is unclear. According to the U.S. Department of Health and Human Services, it is anywhere between 1 in 100 to 1 in 5000. However a study done in 2008 reported to the Annals of Surgery that mistakes in tool and sponge counts happened in 12.5% of surgeries. Additionally, the Patient Safety Monitor Alert, announced in 2003 that 1,500 tools were stitched into patients each year. Khaled Sakhel, part of the Department of Obstetrics and Gynecology at the Eastern Virginia Medical School, reported that it is expected to occur at least once "in every 1,000–1,500" stomach surgeries. An exact count of how often this happens would be impossible to calculate. The Joint Commission on Accreditation for Healthcare Organization (JCAHO) stated that "unintentionally retained foreign bod(ies) without major permanent loss of function" (qtd. in Gibbs) are not required to be reported. Nurses have been discouraged against reporting all errors because of the threat of malpractice and liability issues. Estimates are "undoubtedly low."

=== Gossypiboma ===
Gossypiboma is the official name for a retained sponge/towel after surgery. This word comes from the Latin word for cotton, gossypium, combined with the Swahili word for place of concealment, boma. It is also commonly referred to as textilioma. This word combines textile, meaning cloth, and the suffix –oma, which means growth or tumor.

A case of gossypiboma can be subtle and may not be discovered until months or even years after the surgery has been performed. In rare cases, a situation can be so severe that it is noticed immediately. Some of the ways gossypiboma can present itself are as a mass in the body or as a bowel tumor. Immediately after surgery, a case of gossypiboma can commonly be mistaken for an abscess, especially when it is near a passage between organs (a "fistula"). In those cases where a sponge isn't discovered until much later, it may be impossible to tell the difference between gossypiboma and an "intra-abdominal abscess". This is because both cause air bubbles and "calcification of the cavity wall." Gossypiboma is difficult to diagnose due to vague, inconsistent symptoms and images from x-rays that provide no solid evidence and unclear results. Because it is difficult to diagnose, emphasis has been put on the prevention of the mistake. The following techniques have been put into practice to prevent gossypiboma.

- Radiopaque marking: Before operation, sponges can be soaked through with "radio-opaque marker". This allows a sponge to be easily seen on plain radiographs. When the markers are noticed, it can be assumed that it is revealing a retained sponge. A.P. Zbar, Surgical Directorate at Oldchurch and Harold Wood Hospitals stated "the diagnosis is easily made by plain abdominal radiography, when a radio-opaque marker is seen". This method is flawed in that it doesn't work if the sponges have broken into smaller pieces over time.
- Ultrasonography- Gossypiboma can be recognized with ultrasonography by "the presence of brightly echogenic wavy structures in a cystic mass showing posterior acoustic shadowing that changes in parallel with the direction of the ultrasound beam" according to Zbar and associates.
- Computerized Tomography (CT)- A surgical sponge on a CT will show air bubbles on soft tissue masses. The flaw with this technique is that gossypibomas are easily confused with abscesses.

=== Consequences ===
Dangers of a tool or sponge left behind range anywhere from harmless to life-threatening. Surgical tools left in the body can puncture vital organs and blood vessels, causing internal bleeding. Sponges can fester inside a body, growing increasingly dangerous over time. Additional operations may be necessary, which can be costly and also take the surgical table away from other patients with more urgent needs. Michael Blum said "The incidents observed…took an average of 13 minutes to resolve, a time lapse which can significantly impact the flow of a busy emergency or perioperative department." Another danger is a sponge can be misdiagnosed, resulting in an unnecessary extreme surgery. A radical surgery can be avoided by considering the possibility of a retained sponge or tool.

== Contributing factors ==
Many studies have taken place to pinpoint the causes of tools being forgotten in hopes that they may be avoided in the future. It has been thought that the amount of blood lost in a surgery or the changing of nurses during the surgery would influence the risk of losing something, but studies do not support this. Human factors such as exhaustion, lack of tools necessary to aid in producing an accurate count, and a chaotic environment all have been seen to increase the risk of forgetting a tool. These factors cannot be controlled and surgeons must learn to mitigate them.

Inaccurate counts are a main reason why tools can be left behind. Many cases of a retained instrument originally reported a correct sponge count when the patient was released. An inaccurate count can occur when nurses are deprived of sleep, when the operation is particularly difficult, long, and mentally draining, when the operation is an emergency, or when there are unforeseen changes in the procedure.

An increased amount of chaos and distractions lead to a higher risk of a surgeon forgetting a tool. Mark Hulse from North Shore Medical Center said the following about surgery; "It's a process that's definitely subject to interruption and can be prone to errors. You're doing a hundred other things at the same time, and as much as you try to keep your attention on it [sponge counts] if the surgeon needs something, it's easy to get distracted." Some aspects of surgery that can add to chaos are performing unforeseen changes in the procedure and undergoing emergency surgery. Consequently, the emergency room is the place most likely to make mistakes.

Studies have shown having a high body mass index increases risk. Boston researchers found that a one-point increase in BMI related to a higher risk by 10%. The researchers suggest that "they [surgeons] chalk it up to more room in a patient in which to lose things."

== Retained Surgical Instruments and Unretrieved Device Fragments (UDF) ==
In 2008, the US Food and Drug Administration (FDA) published a Public Health Notification advising on serious adverse events arising from fragments of medical devices left behind after surgical procedures, known as unretrieved device fragments (UDFs). The FDA's Centre for Devices and Radiological Health receives around 1000 adverse event reports each year relating to UDFs. One major source of UDFs is from the failure of surgical instruments.

There are many risks from UDFs. The FDA states: "The adverse events reported include local tissue reaction, infection, perforation and obstruction of blood vessels, and death. Contributing factors may include biocompatibility of the device materials, location of the fragment, potential migration of the fragment, and patient anatomy. During MRI procedures, magnetic fields may cause metallic fragments to migrate, and radiofrequency fields may cause them to heat, causing internal tissue damage and/or burns"

== Preventing incidents ==
Improvement in lowering the number of mistakes likely depends upon improving the surgical system, and not in individual scapegoating. According to the Institute of Medicine, "the problem is not bad people; the problem is that the system needs to be made safer."

In order to improve the system and reduce the number of accidents, some hospitals require four counts of sponges and instruments. The first count happens when the instruments are being set up and the sponges unwrapped. The next count is required right before surgery begins, another count as closure begins, and finally a count during skin closure. This is a general guideline and there are different count methods according to different hospitals.

While careful counting could prevent some mistakes, counting carries its own risks. Sometimes the patient must be worked on immediately, leaving no time to count the instruments to be used beforehand. Another risk of counting after is having to leave the patient under anesthesia longer. In addition, counting may not be entirely beneficial as counting is prone to human error and the majority of the cases of gossypiboma and other retained tools happen under a reported correct count. Dr. Atul A. Gawande, a surgeon, said in an article published in The New England Journal of Medicine that "even though you're following procedures, the priority is the patient, not the procedures."

A new technique that is developing is similar to the Bar Code Medication Administration. The University of California at San Francisco and North Shore Medical Center have installed a "bar coded sponge management system", reasoning that technological error is smaller than human error. Each surgical instrument has a bar code placed on it and nurses pass the items through a hand scanner. The bar code allows each sponge to be identified, resulting in little to no room for error. UCSF reported in April 2008 to have not had "any unintended retained gauze or sponges" since the installation of the system in April 2007.
