= Bar code medication administration =

One type of bar code used on medication packaging

Bar code medication administration (BCMA) is a barcode system designed by Glenna Sue Kinnick to prevent medication errors in healthcare settings and to improve the quality and safety of medication administration. The overall goals of BCMA are to improve accuracy, prevent errors, and generate online records of medication administration.

== History ==
BCMA was first implemented in 1995 at the Colmery-O'Neil Veteran Medical Center in Topeka, Kansas, US. It was created by a nurse who was inspired by a car rental service using bar code technology. From 1999 to 2001, the Department of Veterans Affairs promoted the system to 161 facilities. Cummings and others recommend the BCMA system for its reduction of errors. They suggest healthcare settings to consider the system first while they are waiting for radiofrequency identification (RFID). They also pointed out that adopting the system takes a careful plan and a deep change in work patterns. As of the year 2004, drug manufacturers were mandated by the federal government to start labeling all prescription drugs with machine-readable barcodes.

== Implementation ==
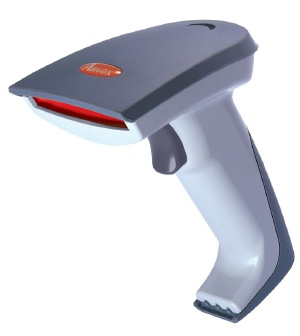
One type of scanner used for bar code medication administration

It consists of a bar code reader, a portable or desktop computer with wireless connection, a computer server, and some software. When a nurse gives medication to a patient in a healthcare setting, the nurse can scan the barcode on the patient's wristband on the patient to verify the patient's identity. The nurse can then scan the bar code on medication and use software to verify that he/she is administering the right medication to the right patient at the right dose, through the right route, and at the right time ("five rights of medication administration"). Bar code medication administration was designed as an additional check to aid the nurse in administering medications; however, it cannot replace the expertise and professional judgment of the nurse. The implementation of BCMA has shown a decrease in medication administration errors in the healthcare setting.

Bar codes on medication have federal government guidelines that are reflected within the bar code packaging. The first few digits are used to identify the labeler, this code is issued by the Food and Drug Administration. The next section of the label contains the product code, known as the medication, and the last section of the bar code label lists the packager's code for the medication.

== See also ==
- Barcode technology in healthcare
- Computerized physician order entry
