= Gossypiboma =

Foreign materials left inside the body following surgery

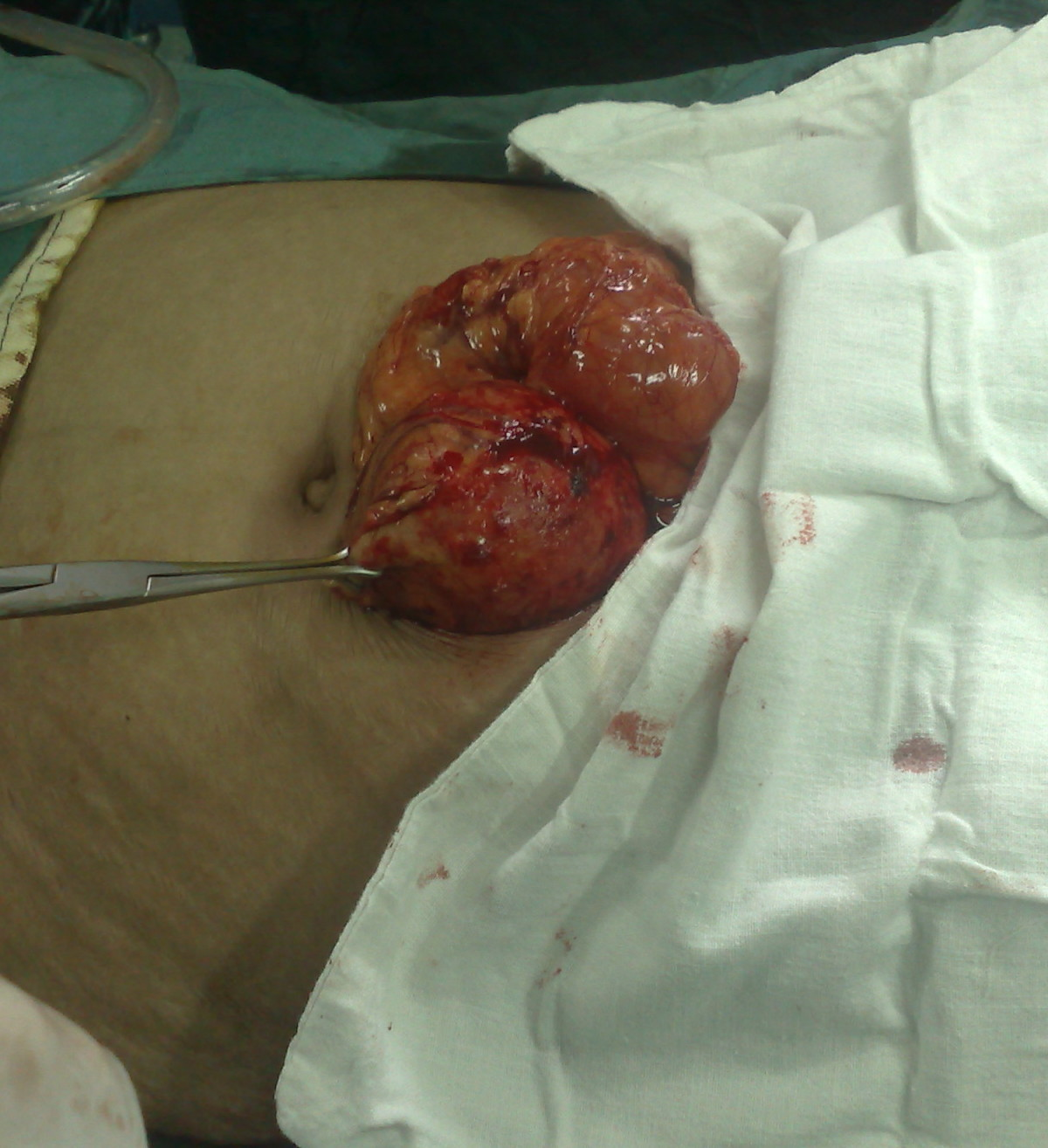
Mini-laparotomy revealed gossypiboma (grasped by the clamp).

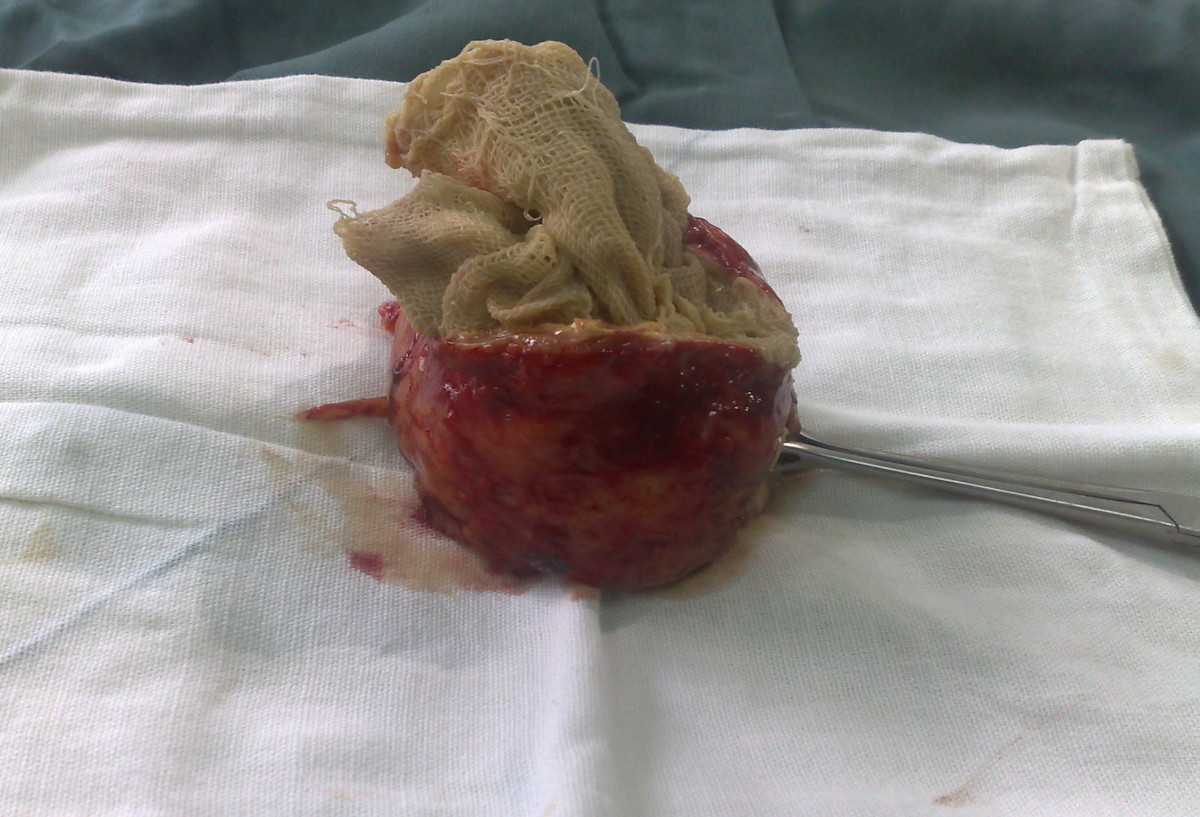
Surgical specimen (gossypiboma).

Gossypiboma, textiloma or more broadly retained foreign object (RFO) is the technical term for surgical complications resulting from foreign materials, such as a surgical sponge, accidentally left inside a patient's body.

== Etymology ==
Gossypiboma is derived from Latin gossypium (cotton) and "-oma"(Greek combining element) meaning a tumor or growth. Gossypiboma describes a mass within a patient's body comprising a cotton matrix surrounded by a foreign body granuloma.

Textiloma is derived from textile (surgical sponges have historically been made of cloth), and is used in place of gossypiboma due to the increasing use of synthetic materials in place of cotton.

== Incidence and clinical presentation ==
The actual incidence of gossypiboma is difficult to determine, possibly due to a reluctance to report occurrences arising from fear of legal repercussions, but retained surgical sponges is reported to occur once in every 3000 to 5000 abdominal operations and are most frequently discovered in the abdomen. The incidence of retained foreign bodies following surgery has a reported rate of 0.01% to 0.001%, of which gossypibomas make up 80% of cases.

Gossypibomas can often present, clinically or radiologically, similar to tumors and abscesses, with widely variable complications and manifestations, making diagnosis difficult and causing significant patient morbidity. Two major types of reaction occur in response to retained surgical foreign bodies. In the first type, an abscess may form with or without a secondary bacterial infection. The second reaction is an aseptic fibrinous response, resulting in tissue adhesions and encapsulation and eventually foreign body granuloma. Symptoms may not present for long periods of time, sometimes months or years following surgery.

== Prevention ==
To prevent gossypiboma, sponges are counted by hand before and after surgeries. This method was codified into recommended guidelines in the 1970s by the Association of periOperative Registered Nurses (AORN). Four separate counts are recommended: the first when instruments and sponges are first unpackaged and set up, a second before the beginning of the surgical procedure, a third as closure begins, and a final count during final skin closure. Other guidelines have been promoted by the American College of Surgeons and the Joint Commission.

In most countries, surgical sponges contain radiopaque material that can be readily identified in radiographic and CT images, facilitating detection. In the United States, radiopaque threads impregnated into surgical gauzes were first introduced in 1929 and were in general use by about 1940. Some surgeons recommend routine postoperative X-ray films after surgery to reduce the likelihood of foreign body inclusion.

== See also ==
- Retained surgical instruments
