= Crossing the Quality Chasm =

Crossing the Quality Chasm: A New Health System for the 21st Century
- Author: Committee on Quality of Health Care in America and Institute of Medicine
- Language: English
- Genre: Non-fiction
- Publisher: National Academies Press
- Publication date: July 19, 2001
- Publication place: United States
- Media type: Print (Hardback)
- Pages: 360 pp.
- ISBN: 978-0-309-07280-9
- OCLC: 46457195
- Dewey Decimal: 362.1/0973 21
- LC Class: RA395.A3 I5557 2001

Crossing the Quality Chasm: A New Health System for the 21st Century is a report on health care quality in the United States published by the Institute of Medicine (IOM) on March 1, 2001. A follow-up to the frequently cited 1999 IOM patient safety report To Err Is Human: Building a Safer Health System, Crossing the Quality Chasm advocates for a fundamental redesign of the U.S. health care system.

== Background ==
In the late 1990s, the IOM established a committee and formal program to study health care quality that led to the development of To Err Is Human and Crossing the Quality Chasm: the Committee on Quality of Health Care in America and the Program on Quality of Health Care in America. They were inspired by an article published by the IOM-sponsored National Roundtable on Health Care Quality in The Journal of the American Medical Association about the harm to patients caused by medical errors. Simultaneously, the National Cancer Policy Board and the President's Advisory Commission on Consumer Protection and Quality in the Health Care Industry published similar reports.

After the positive response to To Err Is Human, which focused purely on patient safety, IOM decided to publish a second, more comprehensive report focused on the other problems and limitations of the existing U.S. health care system. Crossing the Quality Chasm would focus more broadly on overuse (applying medical resources and treatments with insufficient evidence that they lead to greater outcomes), underuse (failing to apply resources or treatments with known benefits), and misuse (failing to execute care safely and correctly) of health care resources and treatments.

== Overview ==
Crossing the Quality Chasm identifies and recommends improvements in six dimensions of health care in the U.S.: patient safety, care effectiveness, patient-centeredness, timeliness, care efficiency, and equity. Safety looks at reducing the likelihood that patients are harmed by medical errors. Effectiveness describes avoiding over and underuse of resources and services. Patient-centeredness relates both to customer service and to considering and accommodating individual patient needs when making care decisions. Timeliness emphasizes reducing wait times. Efficiency focuses on reducing waste and, as a result, total cost of care. Equity looks at closing racial and income gaps in health care.

Given limitations of the existing U.S. health care system, it proposes a new framework for health care with four levels to address the six dimensions: A: Patient experiences, B: Care-giving microsystems, C: Organizations that house and support care-giving microsystems, and D: Legal, financial, and educational environment (e.g., laws, payment, accreditation, professional training). It also discusses obstacles to change across these dimensions and levels.

=== Level A: Patient experiences ===
The first recommendation in Crossing the Quality Chasm relates to setting patient-centric goals for improving the U.S. health care system. It proposes making clear, comprehensive, and bold goals for quality improvement and that those goals should focus on improving patient experiences, the cost to each patient, and equity across disparate racial and income populations. This is in contrast to developing hospital- or physician-centric goals that emphasize the needs of health care organizations and providers.

=== Level B: Care-giving microsystems ===
Crossing the Quality Chasm defines a microcosm as small groups of people, information system(s), client population, and processes (e.g. a local hospital's night shift Emergency Department staff or a cardiac surgery team). It also includes the staff and systems which provide IT solutions related to health care.

The report recommends redesigning these microcosms according to three guidelines. First, by ensuring that care is knowledge-based or that it consistently follows the latest medical best practices. Second, by ensuring it is patient-centric. Third, that they are system-minded or that they look at a patient's care needs as crossing organizational, even competitive, boundaries and that they are not limited to a single experience with a hospital or clinic. It also outlines ten rules to support meeting these guidelines during a redesign process:

#	Current-State	Future-State
1	Care is based primarily on visits	Care is based on continuous healing relationships
2	Professional autonomy drives variability	Care is customized according to patients’ needs and values
3	Professionals control care	The patient is the source of control
4	Information is a record	Knowledge is shared freely
5	Decision making is based on training and experience	Decision making is based on evidence
6	“Do no harm” is an individual responsibility	Safety is a system property
7	Secrecy is necessary	Transparency is necessary
8	The system reacts to needs	Needs are anticipated
9	Cost reduction is sought	Waste is continuously decreased
10	Preference is given to professional roles over the system	Cooperation among clinicians is a priority

=== Level C: Organizations that house and support care-giving microsystems ===
Crossing the Quality Chasm recommends six organizational changes to not only fix problems in the existing U.S. health care system but to allow health care organizations to thrive long-term:

1. Better systems for identifying best practices and ensuring that these best practices become organizational standards
2. Better use of information technology to a) access information and b) support clinical decision making
3. Greater investment in workforce training and skill development
4. Better team coordination
5. Improved care coordination across and within services and organizations, particularly for patients with chronic conditions
6. Better performance measurement

It also recommends that United States Department of Health and Human Services (HHS) invest resources in making clinical best practices easy to access nationwide and support a health care information system infrastructure that includes "the elimination of most handwritten clinical data by the end of the decade.”

=== Level D: Legal, financial, and educational environment ===
Finally, Crossing the Quality Chasm identifies numerous environmental factors, including financing, regulations, accreditation, litigation, workforce education, and social policy. It discusses that the changes recommended in Levels A, B, and C run into barriers caused by these existing environmental factors, which would need to be adjusted in order to redesign the U.S. health care system, but makes few to no concrete recommendations.

=== Barriers ===
The report identified numerous barriers to successful health care transformation, including: inconsistent or fluctuating goals, picking measurements that do not align with the goals, gaps caused by leadership turnover, low investment, outdated technology, unsustainable financing, threat of litigation, overregulation, and professional education that focuses on individual services rather than the system perspective.

== Reception ==
In 2011 Health Affairs journal published a retrospective on the 10-year anniversary of Crossing the Quality Chasm. It credited the two IOM reports with creating the national awareness necessary to drive systemic structural change in U.S. health care, driving additional research to discover previously unknown problems, and providing a foundation for successful quality initiatives over the decade that followed the reports' guiding principles. It also acknowledged that despite improvements, the U.S. health care system needed to continue to change to meet the new framework in Crossing the Quality Chasm.

Modern Healthcare magazine echoed the Health Affairs summary of the decade following Crossing the Quality Chasm. It credited the report with changing how the industry talked about quality in both the public and private sectors as well as for making words such as "evidence-based", “patient-centered", and “transparent” a standard part of health care quality discussions. Despite the broad acceptance of the IOM report, the article also acknowledged that the change in mindset had to be followed by more tangible outcomes and that change had been "glacially slow".
