= Quality use of medicines =

The term Quality use of medicines is used by the Australian government as part of their policies on effective and correct uses of medicine and access to appropriate medicines.

== Guiding Principles ==
Quality Use of Medicines (abbreviated to QUM) is one of the four policy pillars in the Australian Government’s National Medicines Policy first developed in 2000, and involves the safe and judicious use of medicines by the general public.

In the documentation of the National Medicines Policy, the four tenets of Quality Use of Medicines involve medicines being used:

- Judiciously, using medicines only after considering all other options
- Appropriately, choosing a medicine after appraisal of factors including risk-benefit analysis, treatment length and cost
- Safely, minimising misuse and abuse
- Efficaciously, having a quantifiable benefit to the patient’s health and/or quality of life

Quality Use of Medicines is primarily a patient-oriented movement, with the documentation stressing the importance of patient-professional communication along with patient knowledge and understanding their medicines. The term has begun to enter consumer-oriented Australian media in both journalistic and corporate contexts, while the concepts are becoming increasingly central to general pharmaceutical practice.

== Implementation ==
In the 1997-1998 Australian federal budget, the Government allocated funds towards creation of the National Prescribing Service (NPS MedicineWise), a body tasked with undertaking and promoting Quality Use of Medicines work. The organisation’s services such as the Medicine Name Finder andMedicines Line are the most apparent representations of governmental QUM policy at work. Medicines Line, for example, provides a hotline for patients to call with questions about their medicines, furthering the QUM goal of ensuring medicine safety through improved patient knowledge.

The Pharmaceutical Benefits Advisory Committee (PBAC) provides advice and recommendations on whether or not to include medicines on Australia’s Pharmaceutical Benefits Scheme (PBS). The PBAC takes a number of QUM-related factors into account, including those not traditionally looked at by doctors like cost-effectiveness, course length and alternative therapies. The body has been praised for its improvements to the PBS system, most particularly in the area of cost-effectiveness.
