= To Err Is Human (report) =

Landmark report in medicine

To Err Is Human: Building a Safer Health System is a landmark report issued in November 1999 by the U.S. Institute of Medicine that may have resulted in increased awareness of U.S. medical errors. The push for patient safety that followed its release continues. The report was based upon analysis of multiple studies by a variety of organizations and concluded that between 44,000 and 98,000 people die each year as a result of preventable medical errors. For comparison, fewer than 50,000 people died of Alzheimer's disease and 17,000 died of illicit drug use in the same year.

The report called for a comprehensive effort by health care providers, government, consumers, and others. Claiming knowledge of how to prevent these errors already existed, it set a minimum goal of 50 percent reduction in errors over the next five years. Though not currently quantified, as of 2007 this ambitious goal has yet to be met.

== Impact ==
The report "brought the issues of medical error and patient safety to the forefront of national concern".

The report has been called "groundbreaking" for suggesting that 2–4% of all deaths in the United States are caused by medical errors.

The report is credited with raising awareness of the extent to which medical error was a problem. The report described that errors were not rare or isolated, and only by broad planning could they be diminished. It also described that most errors are systemic in the health care industry, and cannot be resolved at the level of individual health care providers.

== Responses ==
The report had a huge impact on management of health care.

As a result of the report President Bill Clinton signed Senate bill 580, the Healthcare Research and Quality Act of 1999, which renamed the Agency for Health Care Policy and Research to Agency for Healthcare Research and Quality to indicate a change in focus. The bill also funded projects through that organization.

== Follow up ==
The report was followed in 2001 by another widely cited Institute of Medicine report, "Crossing the Quality Chasm," which furthers many points from the original study. Both are widely referenced. "To Err Is Human" was the inspiration for the Institute for Healthcare Improvement's 100,000 Lives Campaign , which in 2006 claimed to have prevented an estimated 124,000 deaths in a period of 18 months through patient-safety initiatives in over 3,000 hospitals.

== See also ==
- Diagnosis
- Medical ethics
- How Doctors Think
- Fatal Care: Survive in the U.S. Health System
