= Medical error =

Preventable adverse effect of medical care

A medical error is a preventable adverse effect of care ("iatrogenesis"), whether or not it is evident or harmful to the patient. This might include an inaccurate or incomplete diagnosis or treatment of a disease, injury, syndrome, behavior, infection, or other ailments.

The incidence of medical errors varies depending on the setting. The World Health Organization has named adverse outcomes due to patient care that is unsafe as the 14th causes of disability and death in the world, with an estimated 1/300 people being potentially harmed by healthcare practices around the world.

== Definitions ==
A medical error occurs when a health-care provider chooses an inappropriate method of care or improperly executes an appropriate method of care. Medical errors are often described as "human errors in healthcare".

There are many types of medical error, from minor to major, and causality is often poorly determined.

There are many taxonomies for classifying medical errors.

=== Definitions of diagnostic error ===
Defining diagnostic error is important for measuring its frequency, identifying its causes, and implementing strategies to reduce harm, steps that are essential for improving patient safety. The complexity of diagnosis as both a process (the act of arriving at a diagnosis) and a label (the name of the assigned disease) has led to multiple, overlapping definitions and there is no single definition of diagnostic error.

Diagnostic error with regard to labels has been defined by Graber et al. as a diagnosis that is wrong, egregiously delayed, or missed altogether. This error can only be applied in retrospect, using some gold standard (for example, autopsy findings or a definitive laboratory test) to confirm the correct diagnosis.

Diagnostic error with regard to processes has been defined by Schiff et al. as any breakdown in the diagnostic process, including both errors of omission and errors of commission, and by Singh et al. as a "missed opportunity" in the diagnostic process, based on retrospective review.

In its landmark report, Improving Diagnosis in Health Care, The National Academy of Medicine proposed a new, hybrid definition that includes both label- and process-related aspects: "A diagnostic error is failure to establish an accurate and timely explanation of the patient's health problem(s) or to communicate that explanation to the patient." This is the only definition that specifically includes the patient in the definition wording.

=== Definition of prescription error ===
A prescription or medication error, as defined by the National Coordinating Council for Medication Error Reporting and Prevention, is an event that is preventable that leads to or has led to unsuitable use of medication or has led to harm to the person during the period of time that the medicine is controlled by a clinician, the person, or the consumer. Some adverse drug events can also be related to medication errors.

== Impact ==
One study suggests that 180,000 people die each year partly as a result of iatrogenic injury. This appears to be increasing - for example, the World Health Organization registered 14 million new cases and 8.2 million cancer-related deaths in 2012, and estimated that the number of cases could increase by 70% through 2032. As the number of cancer patients receiving treatment increases, hospitals around the world are seeking ways to improve patient safety, to emphasize traceability and raise efficiency in their cancer treatment processes.

Children are often more vulnerable to a negative outcome when a medication error occurs as they have age-related differences in how their bodies absorb, metabolize, and excrete pharmaceutical agents.

One study reported that approximately 6.9% to 14.5% of pediatric patients were prescribed inappropriate medications secondary to diagnostic inaccuracies.

A 2019 study reported that pediatric emergency departments are susceptible to medication errors due to weight-based dosing calculations, prescribing inaccuracies, and challenges within communication which contributed to inappropriate mediation administration in children.

=== UK ===
In the UK, an estimated 850,000 medical errors occur each year, costing over £2 billion (estimated in the year 2000). The accuracy of this estimate is not clear. Criticism has included the statistical handling of measurement errors in the report, significant subjectivity in determining which deaths were "avoidable" or due to medical error, and an erroneous assumption that 100% of patients would have survived if optimal care had been provided.

=== US ===
Estimated numbers of medical errors occurring in the US have varied. A 2000 Institute of Medicine report estimated that medical errors result in between 44,000 and 98,000 preventable deaths and 1,000,000 excess injuries each year in U.S. hospitals. A 2001 study in the Journal of the American Medical Association of seven Department of Veterans Affairs medical centers estimated that, for roughly every 10,000 patients admitted to the select hospitals, one patient died who would have lived for three months or more in good cognitive health had "optimal" care been provided. Another 2001 study estimated that 1% of hospital admissions result in an adverse event due to negligence. According to a 2002 Agency for Healthcare Research and Quality report, about 7,000 people were estimated to die each year from medication errors – about 16 percent more deaths than the number attributable to work-related injuries (6,000 deaths). Another 2002 report stated that one in five Americans (22%) report that they or a family member have experienced a medical error of some kind. A 2008 literature review in The American Journal of Medicine estimated that between 10 and 15% of physician diagnoses are erroneous.

A 2006 study by the National Academy of Science found that medication errors are among the most common medical mistakes, harming at least 1.5 million people every year. According to the study, 400,000 preventable drug-related injuries occur each year in hospitals, 800,000 in long-term care settings, and roughly 530,000 among Medicare recipients in outpatient clinics. The report stated that these are likely to be conservative estimates.

Medical errors can also have a major financial impact. In 2000 alone, the extra medical costs incurred by preventable drug-related injuries sustained by Medicare recipients approximated $887 million. None of these figures take into account lost wages and productivity or other costs. in 2010, the projected cost of medical errors to the U.S. economy was approximately $20 billion, 87% of which was direct increases in medical costs of providing services to patient affected by medical errors. Medical errors can increase average hospital costs by as much as $4,769 per patient.

=== Canada ===
A study reported that in Canada, the medication errors morbidity and mortality has been estimated to cost $11 billion annually, which is comparable to the United States at $8.9 billion. Canadian data demonstrated that 28% of emergency department visits were drug related events and 70% have been preventable.

=== Outpatient vs. inpatient ===
Misdiagnosis is the leading cause of medical error in outpatient facilities. Since the National Institute of Medicine's 1999 report, "To Err is Human," found that up to 98,000 hospital patients die from preventable medical errors in the U.S. each year, government and private sector efforts have focused on inpatient safety.

=== Difficulties in studying medical errors ===
The identification of errors may be a challenge in these studies, and mistakes may be more common than reported. Studies tend to identify only mistakes that led to measurable adverse events occurring soon after the errors. Independent review of doctors' treatment plans suggests that decision-making could be improved in 14% of admissions; many of the benefits would have delayed manifestations.

One study in 2003 suggested that adults in the United States receive only 55% of recommended care. At the same time, a second study found that 30% of care in the United States may be unnecessary. If a doctor failed to order a mammogram that is past due, this mistake would not show up in the first type of study. In addition, because no adverse event occurred during the short follow-up of the study, the mistake also would not show up in the second type of study because only the principal treatment plans were critiqued. However, the mistake would be recorded in the third type of study. If a doctor recommends an unnecessary treatment or test, it may not show in any of these types of studies.

Another difficulty is that causes of death on United States death certificates, statistically compiled by the Centers for Disease Control and Prevention (CDC), are coded in the International Classification of Disease (ICD), which does not include codes for human and system factors.

== Causes ==
The research literature has shown that medical errors are caused by errors of commission and errors of omission. Errors of omission are made when providers did not take action when they should have, while errors of commission occur when decisions and action are delayed. Medical errors of both types can be attributed to a number of causes including inexperienced physicians and nurses, new procedures, extremes of age, and complex or urgent care. A special form of an error of commission occurs when health care professionals commit to unnecessary treatment in the case of Medical child abuse.

Many medical errors have been attributed to communication failures. For example, a study of data covering 67,826 patients found that poor communication contributed to 24% of patient safety incidents, and was the only identifiable cause in 13.2% of patient safety incidents. Communication failures may include translation issues (as may be the case for medical tourists), improper documentation, illegible handwriting, spelling errors, inadequate nurse-to-patient ratios, and confusion about similarly named medications.

Misdiagnosis may be associated with individual characteristics of the patient or due to the patient multimorbidity.

Patient actions or inactions may also contribute significantly to medical errors.

=== Medication error ===
A study conducted of prescribing and prescriptions-related errors revealed prevalence rates ranging from 1% to 11% of all prescriptions. These were recognized as significant threats to patient safety. The most reported medication errors involved incorrect medication dosing, followed by potential adverse drug interaction.

=== Healthcare complexity ===
Complicated technologies, powerful drugs, intensive care, rare and multiple diseases, and prolonged hospital stay can contribute to medical errors. In turn, medical errors from carelessness or improper use of medical devices often lead to severe injuries or death. For example, since 2015, 60 injuries and 23 deaths have been caused by misplaced feeding tubes while using the Cortrak2 EAS system, leading to FDA recalling Avanos Medical's Cortrak system in 2022 due to its severity and the high toll associated with the medical error.

Complexity makes diagnosis especially challenging. There are less than 200 symptoms listed in Wikipedia, but there are probably more than 10,000 known diseases and the World Health Organization's system for the International Classification of Disease, 9th Edition from 1979 listed over 14,000 diagnosis codes. Textbooks of medicine often describe the most typical presentations of a disease, but in many conditions patients may have variable presentations instead of the classical signs and symptoms. To add complexity, the signs and symptoms of a given condition change over time; in the early stages the signs and symptoms may be absent or minimal, and then these evolve as the condition progresses. Diagnosis is often challenging in infants and children who can't clearly communicate their symptoms, and in the elderly, where signs and symptoms may be muted or absent.

There are more than 7000 rare diseases alone, and in aggregate these are not uncommon: Roughly 1 in 17 patients will be diagnosed with a rare disease over their lifetime. Physicians may have only learned a handful of these during their education and training.

=== System and process design ===
In 2000, The Institute of Medicine released "To Err Is Human," which asserted that the problem in medical errors is not bad people in health care—it is that good people are working in bad systems that need to be made safer.

Poor communication and unclear lines of authority between physicians, nurses, and other care providers are contributing factors. Disconnected reporting systems within a hospital can result in fragmented systems in which numerous hand-offs of patients results in lack of coordination and errors.

Other factors include the impression that action is being taken by other groups within the institution, reliance on automated systems to prevent error, and inadequate systems to share information about errors, which hampers analysis of contributory causes and improvement strategies. Cost-cutting measures by hospitals in response to reimbursement cutbacks can compromise patient safety. In emergencies, patient care may be rendered in areas poorly suited for safe monitoring. The American Institute of Architects has also identified concerns for the safe design and construction of health care facilities. Infrastructure failure is often a concern: according to the WHO, 50% of medical equipment in developing countries is only partly usable due to lack of skilled operators or parts. As a result, diagnostic procedures or treatments cannot be performed, leading to substandard treatment.

The Joint Commission's Annual Report on Quality and Safety 2007 found that inadequate communication between healthcare providers, or between providers and the patient and family members, was the root cause of over half the serious adverse events in accredited hospitals. Other leading causes included inadequate assessment of the patient's condition, and poor leadership or training.

=== Competency, education, and training ===
Variations in healthcare provider training & experience and failure to acknowledge the prevalence and seriousness of medical errors also increase the risk.

The involvement of medical students may also have an effect. For example, the so-called July effect occurs when new residents arrive at teaching hospitals, causing an increase in medication errors as demonstrated by a study of data from 1979 to 2006.

This has been disputed: while the Committee on Quality of Health Care in America described medical mistakes as an "unavoidable outcome of learning to practice medicine", as of 2019, the commonly accepted link between prescribing skills and clinical clerkships has not yet been demonstrated by the available data. Conversely, in the U.S. legibility of handwritten prescriptions has been indirectly responsible for at least 7,000 deaths annually.

=== Human factors and ergonomics ===
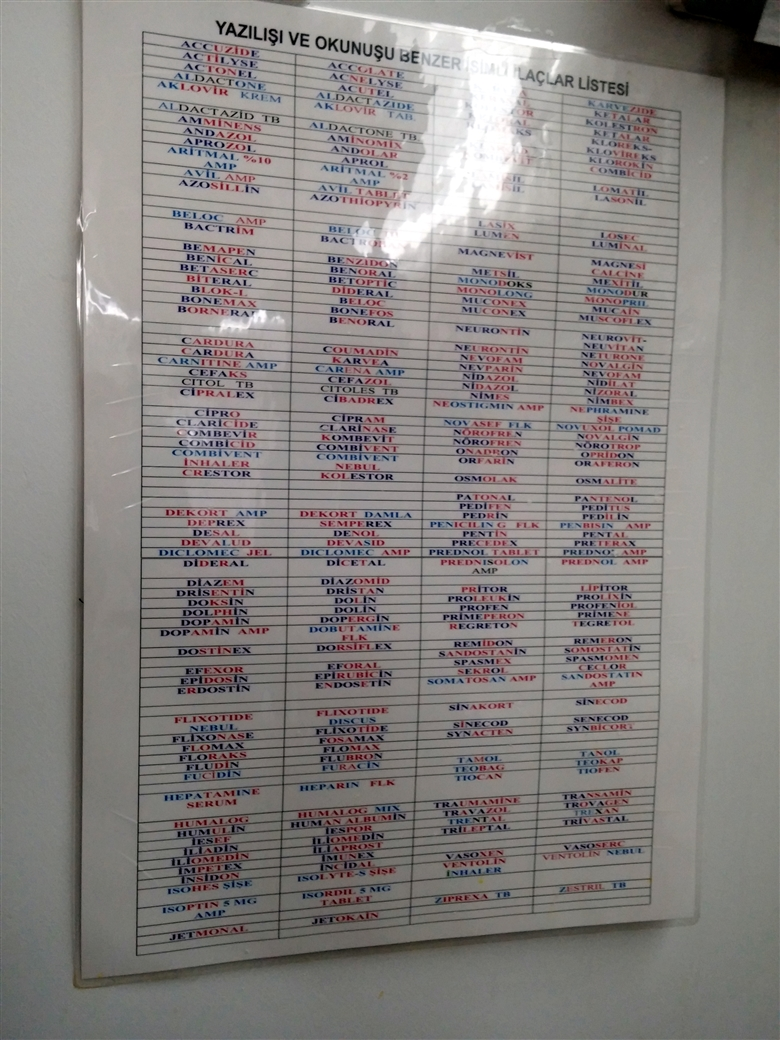
A plate written in a hospital, containing drugs that are similar in spelling or writing

Cognitive errors commonly encountered in medicine were initially identified by psychologists Amos Tversky and Daniel Kahneman in the early 1970s. Jerome Groopman, author of How Doctors Think, described "cognitive pitfalls", biases which cloud logic. For example, a practitioner may overvalue the first data encountered, recall a recent or dramatic case that quickly comes to mind, or have their thinking prejudiced due to stereotypes. Pat Croskerry describes clinical reasoning as an interplay between intuitive, subconscious thought (System 1) and deliberate, conscious rational consideration (System 2). In this framework, many cognitive errors reflect over-reliance on System 1 processing, although they may also sometimes involve System 2.

Physician well-being has also been recommended as an indicator of healthcare quality given its association with patient safety outcomes. For example, sleep deprivation has been cited as a contributing factor in medical errors. One study found that being awake for over 24 hours caused medical interns to double or triple the number of preventable medical errors, including those that resulted in injury or death. The risk of car crash after these shifts increased by 168%, and the risk of near miss by 460%. Interns admitted to falling asleep during lectures, during rounds, and even during surgeries. One study found that night shifts are associated with worse surgeon performance during laparoscopic surgeries.

Other practitioner risk factors include fatigue, depression, and burnout. A meta-analysis involving 21517 participants found that physicians with depressive symptoms had a 95% higher risk of reporting medical errors and that the association between physician depressive symptoms and medical errors is bidirectional

Factors related to the clinical setting include diversity of patients, unfamiliar settings, time pressures, and patient-to-nurse staffing ratio increases. Drug names that look alike or sound alike are also a problem.

Errors in interpreting medical images are often perceptual instead of "fact-based", being caused by failures of attention or vision. For example, visual illusions can cause radiologists to misperceive images. Medical practitioners may also simply fail to see or notice signs of disease on an image. The retrospective "miss" rate among abnormal imaging studies is reported to be as high as 30% (the real-life error rate is much lower, around 4-5%, because not all images are abnormal), and up to 20% of missed findings result in long-term adverse effects.

A number of Information Technology (IT) systems have been developed to detect and prevent medication errors, the most common type of medical errors. These systems screen data such as ICD-9 codes, pharmacy and laboratory data. Rules are used to look for changes in medication orders, and abnormal laboratory results that may be indicative of medication errors and/or adverse drug events.

== Examples ==
Errors can include misdiagnosis or delayed diagnosis, administration of the wrong drug to the wrong patient or in the wrong way, giving multiple drugs that interact negatively, surgery on an incorrect site, failure to remove all surgical instruments, failure to take the correct blood type into account, or incorrect record-keeping.

=== Errors in diagnosis ===
One large study reported several cases where patients were wrongly told that they were HIV-negative after the physicians erroneously ordered and interpreted HTLV (a closely related virus) testing rather than HIV testing. In the same study, >90% of HTLV tests were ordered erroneously.

Misdiagnosis of lower extremity cellulitis is estimated to occur in 30% of patients, leading to unnecessary hospitalizations in 85% and unnecessary antibiotic use in 92%. Collectively, these errors lead to between 50,000 and 130,000 unnecessary hospitalizations and between $195 and $515 million in avoidable health care spending annually in the United States.

Female sexual desire has historically been diagnosed as female hysteria.

Sensitivities to foods and food allergies risk being misdiagnosed as the eating disorder orthorexia.

Progressive supranuclear palsy has often been misdiagnosed as Parkinson's disease as both involve slowed movements and gait difficulty.

Studies have found that bipolar disorder has often been misdiagnosed as major depression. Its early diagnosis necessitates that clinicians pay attention to the features of the patient's depression and also look for present or prior hypomanic or manic symptomatology.

The misdiagnosis of schizophrenia is also a common problem. There may be long delays in patients getting a correct diagnosis of this disorder.

Delayed sleep phase disorder is often misdiagnosed and may be confused with psychophysiological insomnia; depression; psychiatric disorders such as schizophrenia, ADHD or ADD; other sleep disorders; or school refusal. Practitioners of sleep medicine point out the dismally low rate of accurate diagnosis of the disorder, and have often asked for better physician education on sleep disorders.

Cluster headaches are often undiagnosed, misdiagnosed, or mismanaged for many years. They may be confused with migraine, "cluster-like" headache (or mimics), CH subtypes, other TACs (trigeminal autonomic cephalalgias), or other types of primary or secondary headache syndrome. Cluster-like head pain may also be diagnosed as secondary headache rather than cluster headache. Under-recognition of CH by health care professionals is reflected in consistent findings in Europe and the United States that the average time to diagnosis is around seven years.

Asperger syndrome and autism tend to be undiagnosed, misdiagnosed, or belatedly diagnosed. Delayed or mistaken diagnosis can be traumatic for individuals and families; for example, misdiagnosis can lead to medications that worsen behavior.

Field trials of the Diagnostic and Statistical Manual of Mental Disorders, Fifth Edition (DSM-5) included "test-retest reliability" which involved different clinicians doing independent evaluations of the same patient—a new approach to the study of diagnostic reliability.

=== Errors in prescription and medication ===
Prescription errors may relate to ambiguous abbreviations; incorrect spelling of medication names; improper use of nomenclature, decimal points, unit or rate expressions; illegibility and improper instructions; miscalculations of the posology (quantity, route and frequency of administration, duration of the treatment, dosage form and dosage strength); lack of information about patients (e.g. allergy, declining renal function) or misreporting in the medical documents. There were an estimated 66 million clinically significant medication errors in the British NHS in 2018. The resulting adverse drug reactions are estimated to cause around 700 deaths a year in England and to contribute to around 22,000 deaths a year. The British researchers did not find any evidence that error rates were lower in other countries, and the global cost was estimated at $42 billion per year.

Medication errors may include omissions, delayed dosing and incorrect medication administrations. Medication errors are not always readily identified, but can be reported using case note reviews or incident reporting systems. There are pharmacist-led interventions that can reduce the incident of medication error: for example, electronic prescribing has been shown to reduce prescribing errors by up to 30%.

== Mitigation and responses ==
Mistakes can have a strongly negative emotional impact on the doctors who commit them. Numerous mitigation techniques and responses have been described.

=== Recognizing that mistakes are not isolated events ===
Adverse outcomes from errors usually do not happen because of an isolated error and may actually reflect systemic problems. This concept is often referred to as the Swiss Cheese Model. This can be mitigated by ensuring that there are layers of protection for clinicians and patients to prevent mistakes from occurring. Therefore, even if a doctor or nurse makes a small error (e.g. incorrect dose of drug written on a drug chart by doctor), it is picked up before it actually affects patient care (e.g. pharmacist checks the drug chart and rectifies the error). Such mechanisms include practical alterations (e.g. medications that cannot be given through IV being fitted with tubing so that they physically cannot be linked to an IV), systematic safety processes (e.g. ensuring that all patients must have a Waterlow score assessment and falls assessment completed on admission), and training programmes and continuing professional development courses.

There may be several breakdowns in processes to allow one adverse outcome. In addition, errors are more common when other demands compete for a physician's attention. However, placing too much blame on the system may not be constructive.

=== Placing the practice of medicine in perspective ===
Essayists have suggested that the potential to make mistakes is part of what makes being a physician rewarding and that, without this potential, the rewards of medical practice would be diminished. For example, Laurence states that "everybody dies, you and all of your patients. All relationships end. Would you want it any other way? [...] Don't take it personally".. Meanwhile Seder states "[...] if I left medicine, I would mourn its loss as I've mourned the passage of my poetry. On a daily basis, it is both a privilege and a joy to have the trust of patients and their families and the camaraderie of peers. There is no challenge to make your blood race like that of a difficult case, no mind game as rigorous as the challenging differential diagnosis, and though the stakes are high, so are the rewards."

=== Disclosing mistakes ===
Forgiveness, which is part of many cultural traditions, may be important in coping with medical mistakes. Among other healing processes, it can be accomplished through the use of communicative disclosure guidelines.

==== To oneself ====
Inability to forgive oneself may create a cycle of distress and increased likelihood of a future error.

However, Wu et al. suggest that "...those who coped by accepting responsibility were more likely to make constructive changes in practice, but [also] to experience more emotional distress." It may also be helpful to consider the much larger number of patients who are not exposed to mistakes and are helped by medical care.

==== To patients ====
Patient disclosure is important in the medical error process. The current standard of practice at many hospitals is to disclose errors to patients when they occur. Gallagher et al. state that patients want "information about what happened, why the error happened, how the error's consequences will be mitigated, and how recurrences will be prevented." Interviews with patients and families reported in a 2003 book by Rosemary Gibson and Janardan Prasad Singh put forward that those who have been harmed by medical errors face a "wall of silence" and "want an acknowledgement" of the harm. With honesty, "healing can begin not just for the patients and their families but also the doctors, nurses and others involved."

A review of studies examining patients' views on investigations of medical harm found commonalities in their expectations of the process. For example, many wanted reviews to be transparent, trustworthy, and person-centred to meet their needs. People wanted to be meaningfully involved in the process and to be treated with respect and empathy. Justice-seekers wanted an honest account of what happened, the circumstances leading up to it, and measures to ensure it does not happen again. Responses that involved people independent of the organisation responsible for harm gave investigations credibility.

A 2005 study by Wendy Levinson of the University of Toronto showed surgeons discussing medical errors used the word "error" or "mistake" in only 57% of disclosure conversations and offered a verbal apology only 47% of the time.

In the past, it was a common fear that disclosure to the patient would incite a malpractice lawsuit. Many physicians would not explain that an error had taken place, causing a lack of trust toward the healthcare community. However, disclosure may actually reduce malpractice payments.

In 2007, 34 states passed legislation that precludes any information from a physician's apology for a medical error from being used in malpractice court (even a full admission of fault). This encourages physicians to acknowledge and explain mistakes to patients, keeping an open line of communication. Furthermore many states have enacted laws excluding expressions of sympathy after accidents as proof of liability.

The American Medical Association's Council on Ethical and Judicial Affairs states in its ethics code:

"Situations occasionally occur in which a patient suffers significant medical complications that may have resulted from the physician's mistake or judgment. In these situations, the physician is ethically required to inform the patient of all facts necessary to ensure understanding of what has occurred. Concern regarding legal liability which might result following truthful disclosure should not affect the physician's honesty with a patient."

From the American College of Physicians Ethics Manual:

"In addition, physicians should disclose to patients information about procedural or judgment errors made in the course of care if such information is material to the patient's well-being. Errors do not necessarily constitute improper, negligent, or unethical behavior, but failure to disclose them may."

In a line of experimental investigations, Annegret Hannawa et al. developed evidence-based disclosure guidelines under the scientific "Medical Error Disclosure Competence (MEDC)" framework.

Some studies have described a "gap between physicians' attitudes and practices regarding error disclosure". Willingness to disclose errors was associated with higher training level and a variety of patient-centered attitudes, and it was not lessened by previous exposure to malpractice litigation. Hospital administrators may share these concerns.

Reluctance to disclose medical errors to patients may also stem from psychological reasons. In his book, Medical Errors and Medical Narcissism, John Banja defines "medical narcissism" as the need of health professionals to preserve their self-esteem leading to the compromise of error disclosure to patients.

==== To non-physicians ====
In a study of physicians who reported having made a mistake, it was offered that disclosing to non-physician sources of support may reduce stress more than disclosing to physician colleagues. This may be due to the finding that, of the physicians in the same study, when presented with a hypothetical scenario of a mistake made by another colleague, only 32% of them would have unconditionally offered support. It is possible that greater benefit occurs when spouses are physicians.

==== To other physicians ====
Discussing mistakes with other physicians is beneficial. However, medical providers may be less forgiving of one another.

==== To the physician's institution ====
Disclosure of errors, especially "near misses", may be able to reduce subsequent errors in institutions that are capable of reviewing near misses. However, doctors report that institutions may not be supportive of the doctor.

=== Covering up errors ===
Based on anecdotal and survey evidence, a 2008 study suggests that rationalization is very common within the medical profession to cover up medical errors.

In a survey of more than 10,000 physicians in the United States, when asked the question, "Are there times when it's acceptable to cover up or avoid revealing a mistake if that mistake would not cause harm to the patient?", 19% answered yes, 60% answered no and 21% answered it depends. When asked "Are there times when it is acceptable to cover up or avoid revealing a mistake if that mistake would potentially or likely harm the patient?", 2% answered yes, 95% answered no and 3% answered it depends.

=== Legal procedure ===
Standards and regulations for medical malpractice vary by country and jurisdiction within countries. Medical professionals may obtain professional liability insurances to offset the risk and costs of lawsuits based on medical malpractice.

== Prevention ==
Medical care is frequently compared adversely to aviation; while many of the factors that lead to errors in both fields are similar, aviation's error management protocols are regarded as much more effective. Safety measures can include informed consent, second opinions voluntary reporting of errors, root cause analysis, reminders to improve patient medication adherence, hospital accreditation, and systems to ensure review by experienced or specialist practitioners.

A template has been developed for the design (both structure and operation) of hospital medication safety programmes, particularly for acute tertiary settings, which emphasizes safety culture, infrastructure, data (specifically error detection and analysis), communication and training.

=== Reporting ===
In the United States, adverse medical event reporting systems were mandated in just over half (27) of the states as of 2014, a figure unchanged since 2007. In the U.S.' hospitals' error reporting is a condition of payment by Medicare. An investigation by the Office of Inspector General, Department of Health and Human Services, released January 6, 2012 found that most errors were not reported and that, even when errors were reported and investigated, changes were seldom made which would prevent them in the future. The investigation revealed that there was often lack of knowledge regarding which events were reportable and recommended that lists of reportable events be developed.

=== Cause-specific preventive measures ===
Traditionally, errors are attributed to mistakes made by individuals, who then may be penalized. A common method of preventing specific errors is requiring additional checks at particular points in the system, whose findings and detail of execution must be recorded. For example, an error of free flow IV administration of heparin may be approached by teaching staff as a lesson in how to use the IV systems and a reminder to use special care in setting the IV pump. Subsequently, while overall errors become less likely, the checks add to workload and may in themselves be a cause of additional errors. In some hospitals, a regular morbidity and mortality conference meeting is scheduled to discuss complications or deaths and learn from or improve the overall processes.

A newer model for improvement in medical care takes its origin from the work of W. Edwards Deming in a model of Total Quality Management. In this model, there is an attempt to identify the underlying system defect that allowed the error to occur. As an example, the error of free flow IV administration of heparin is dealt with by not using IV heparin and substituting subcutaneous administration of heparin, obviating the entire problem. However, such an approach presupposes available research showing that subcutaneous heparin is as effective as IV. Thus, most systems use a combination of approaches to the problem.

Another example of a cause-specific preventative measure is the redesign of the presentation and packaging of the appliances and agents used for intrathecal administration of local anaesthetics. For example, one spinal needle with a syringe prefilled with the local anaesthetic agents would be marketed in a single blister pack, which would be peeled open and presented to the anaesthesiologist conducting the procedure.

=== Anaesthesiology ===
The field of medicine that has taken the lead in systems approaches to safety is anaesthesiology. Steps such as standardization of IV medications to 1 ml doses, national and international color-coding standards, and development of improved airway support devices have made the field a model of systems improvement in care.

=== Medications ===
Reducing errors in prescribing, dispensing, compounding/formulating, labelling, and handling medications is a priority and has been the subject of systematic reviews and studies. Suggested methods to reduce errors and improve safety include: training professionals or using databases to compare new and previous prescribed medications to prevent mistakes, also known as "medication reconciliation", prescribing through an electronic medical record system and/or using decision support systems that has automatic checks in place, with computerized alerts or other novel technologies; the use of medical barcodes; healthcare professional and patient training or supplementary educational programs; adding in an extra step for double checking prescriptions (both at the level of the healthcare professional and at the administrator level); using standardized protocols in the workplace that include a check-list, physical markings or writing on syringes to indicate correct doses; programmes that include the person being able to administer the medications themselves; ensuring that the workplace or environment is well-lit; monitoring and adjusting healthcare professional working hours, and the use of an interdisciplinary team. There is weak evidence indicating that a number of these suggested interventions may be helpful in reducing errors or improving patient safety, but no practice has stood out as being exceptionally helpful. Evidence supporting improvements aimed at reducing medical errors in medications for pediatric hospitalized patients is also very weak.

A study found that medication errors in community pharmacies would be reduced through systematic prescription review, improved pharmacist- physician communication, educating the patient, enhanced error- reporting systems, and standardized dispensing procedures.

=== Historic methods ===
As far back as the 1930s, pharmacists worked with physicians to select, from many options, the safest and most effective drugs available for use in hospitals. The process is known as the Formulary System and the list of drugs is known as the Formulary. In the 1960s, hospitals implemented unit dose packaging and unit dose drug distribution systems to reduce the risk of wrong drug and wrong dose errors in hospitalized patients. Centralized sterile admixture services were shown to decrease the risks of contaminated and infected intravenous medications and pharmacists provided drug information and clinical decision support directly to physicians to improve the safe and effective use of medications. Pharmacists are recognized experts in medication safety and have made many contributions that reduce error and improve patient care over the last 50 years. More recently, governments have attempted to address issues like patient-pharmacist communication and consumer knowledge through measures like the Australian Government's Quality Use of Medicines policy.

== Misconceptions ==
Some common misconceptions about medical error include:

- Medical error is the "third leading cause of death" in the United States. This stems from an erroneous 2016 study which, according to David Gorski, "has taken on a life of its own" and fuelled "a myth promulgated by both quacks and academics".
- "Bad apples" or incompetent health care providers are a common cause. Although human error is commonly an initiating event, the faulty care delivery process invariably permits or compounds the harm and so is the focus of improvement.
- High-risk procedures or medical specialties are responsible for most avoidable adverse events. Although some mistakes, such as in surgery, are harder to conceal, errors occur in all levels of care. Even though complex procedures entail more risk, adverse outcomes are not usually due to error, but may be to the severity of the condition being treated. However, United States Pharmacopeia has reported that medication errors during the course of a surgical procedure are three times more likely to cause harm to a patient than those occurring in other types of hospital care.
- If a patient experiences an adverse event during the process of care, an error has occurred. Most medical care entails some level of risk, and there can be complications or side effects, even unforeseen ones, from the underlying condition or from the treatment itself.

== See also ==
- Serious adverse event
- Adverse drug reaction
- Biosafety
- Diagnostic stewardship
- Emily's Law
- Fatal Care: Survive in the U.S. Health System (book)
- Medical malpractice
- Medical resident work hours
- Sleep deprivation
- Patient Safety and Quality Improvement Act of 2005
- Patient safety organization
- Quality use of medicines
