= Patient safety organization =

Group that improves medical care by reducing medical errors

A patient safety organization (PSO) is an organization that seeks to improve medical care by advocating for the reduction of medical errors. Common functions of patient safety organizations include health care data collection, reporting and analysis on health care outcomes, educating providers and patients, raising funds to improve health care, and advocating for safety-oriented policy changes. In the United States, the term typically refers only to PSOs that have been formally recognized by the Secretary of Health and Human Services and listed with the Agency for Healthcare Research and Quality. A federally-designated PSO differs from a typical PSO in that it provides health care providers in the U.S. privilege and confidentiality protections in exchange for efforts to improve patient safety.

In the 1990s, reports in several countries revealed a staggering number of patient injuries and deaths each year due to avoidable errors and deficiencies in health care, among them adverse events and complications arising from poor infection control. In the United States, a 1999 report from the Institute of Medicine called for a broad national effort to prevent these events, including the establishment of patient safety centers, expanded reporting of adverse events, and development of safety programs in healthcare organizations. Although many PSOs are funded and run by governments, others have sprung from private entities such as industry, professional, health insurance providers, and consumer groups.

== Functions ==
The functions of a PSO can be diverse, but the United States government formally defines "patient safety activities" as:

1. Efforts to improve patient safety and the quality of health care delivery.
2. The collection and analysis of patient safety work product.
3. The development and dissemination of information with respect to improving patient safety, such as recommendations, protocols, or information regarding best practices.
4. The utilization of patient safety work product for the purposes of encouraging a culture of safety and of providing feedback and assistance to effectively minimize patient risk.
5. The maintenance of procedures to preserve confidentiality with respect to patient safety work product.
6. The provision of appropriate security measures with respect to patient safety work product.
7. The utilization of qualified staff.
8. Activities related to the operation of a patient safety evaluation system and to the provision of feedback to participants in a patient safety evaluation system.

== Governmental organizations ==
=== World Health Organization ===
==== World Alliance for Patient Safety ====
In response to a 2002 World Health Assembly Resolution, the World Health Organization (WHO) launched the World Alliance for Patient Safety in October 2004. The goal was to develop standards for patient safety and assist UN member states to improve the safety of health care. The Alliance raises awareness and political commitment to improve the safety of care and facilitates the development of patient safety policy and practice in all WHO Member States. Each year, the Alliance delivers a number of programs covering systemic and technical aspects to improve patient safety around the world.

At the Fifty-Ninth World Health Assembly in May 2006, the Secretariat reported that the Alliance held patient safety meetings in five of the six WHO regions and 40 technical workshops in 18 countries. Since the launch of the Alliance in October 2004, significant progress was achieved in six areas:

1. The First Global Patient Safety Challenge, which for 2005–2006 (addressing health care-associated infection) developed the WHO Guidelines on Hand Hygiene in Health Care.
2. A patient involvement group, Patients for Patient Safety, built networks of patients’ organizations from around the world, through regional workshops.
3. A patient safety taxonomy was developed to classify data on patient safety problems.
4. Prevalence studies conducted on patient harm in ten developing countries.
5. A WHO Collaborating Centre was established to develop and disseminate safety solutions.
6. The WHO Draft Guidelines on Adverse Event Reporting and Learning Systems.

==== Patients for Patient Safety (PFPS) ====
Patients for Patient Safety is part of the World Alliance for Patient Safety launched in 2004 by the WHO. The project emphasizes the central role patients and consumers can play in efforts to improve the quality and safety of healthcare around the world. PFPS works with a global network of patients, consumers, caregivers, and consumer organizations to support patient involvement in patient safety programs, both within countries and in the global programs of the World Alliance for Patient Safety.

=== Australia and New Zealand ===
==== Therapeutic Goods Administration and Adverse Drug Reactions Advisory Committee ====
The Therapeutic Goods Administration (TGA) is a unit of the Australian Government Department of Health and Ageing. The TGA approves and monitors prescription and non-prescription drugs (including herbal products), medical supplies and devices and blood and biological products. Risks to users are assessed prior to product introduction, and manufacturers are regularly audited for efficacy, quality and safety. Manufacturers are required to report adverse drug effects to the Adverse Drug Reactions Advisory Committee (ADRAC) of the TGA; reporting by medical professionals and consumers is voluntary. ADRAC notifies medical professionals and the public through recalls and alerts on its website and publications.

In December 2003, the Australian and New Zealand Governments signed an agreement to establish a joint regulatory organisation for therapeutic products. The Australia New Zealand Therapeutic Products Authority (ANZTPA) will replace the Australian Therapeutic Goods Administration (TGA) and the New Zealand Medicines and Medical Devices Safety Authority (Medsafe), and be accountable to the Australian and New Zealand Governments. Implementing legislation is scheduled for introduction into both countries' parliaments in July 2006.

On 16 July 2007, the New Zealand State Services Minister Annette King announced that "The Government is not proceeding at this stage with legislation that would have enabled the establishment of a joint agency with Australia to regulate therapeutic products." She further advised that "The [New Zealand] Government does not have the numbers in Parliament to put in place a sensible, acceptable compromise that would satisfy all parties at this time. The Australian Government has been informed of the situation and agrees that suspending negotiations on the joint authority is a sensible course of action."

==== Australian Commission on Safety and Quality in Health Care ====
The Australian Commission on Safety and Quality in Health Care (the commission) was established by the Australian, State and Territory Governments to lead and coordinate national improvements in safety and quality. The Commission replaced the Australian Council for Safety and Quality in Health Care in 2006.

The Commission engages in collaborative work in patient safety and healthcare quality that benefits from national coordination. This includes the development of the Australian Charter of Healthcare Rights and the National Safety and Quality Health Service Standards, improving areas such as patient identification, medication safety, clinical handover and open disclosure, and reducing healthcare associated infection. The commission has also developed the National Safety and Quality Framework to improve the safety and quality of the Australian health system.

Other key areas of work for the Commission include National Health Service accreditation, recognising and responding to clinical deterioration, patient centred care, safety and quality in mental health and primary care and the development of national safety and quality indicators as part of the information strategies activity.

In its role primarily as a coordination and facilitation body, the Commission utilises evidence and data and the experience, enthusiasm and commitment of consumers, clinicians, managers and other stakeholders to influence the system to make changes for the safety and quality of health care in Australia.

=== New Zealand Health Quality & Safety Commission ===
The New Zealand Health Quality & Safety Commission was established in November 2010 as a Crown entity under the New Zealand Public Health and Disability Act 2000 to lead and co-ordinate work across the health and disability sector for the purposes of:

- monitoring and improving the quality and safety of health and disability support services
- helping providers across the whole sector to improve the quality and safety of services.

The Commission aims to reduce avoidable deaths and harm, reduce wastage, and make the best use of the health dollar. It works towards the New Zealand Triple Aim for quality improvement:

- improved quality, safety and experience of care
- improved health and equity for all populations
- best value for public health system resources.

Commission programs include medication safety, infection prevention and control, reportable events, consumer engagement and participation, and mortality review committees.

=== United Kingdom ===
==== National Patient Safety Agency ====
The National Patient Safety Agency (NPSA) is an NHS special health authority created in July 2001 to improve patient safety within the National Health Service (NHS) by encouraging voluntary reporting of medical errors, conducting analysis and initiating preventative measures. Since 2005, the NPSA has also been responsible for: safety aspects of hospital design, cleanliness and food; safe research practices through the National Research Ethics Service (NRES); and the performance of individual doctors and dentists, through the National Clinical Assessment Service (NCAS). The NPSA identifies patient safety deficiencies with the input of clinical experts and patients, develops solutions and monitors results of corrections within the NHS. Initiatives and alerts include hand hygiene, information for doctors and patients on steps to reduce the risk of error, vaccine safety and disclosure of errors to injured patients. In addition, the National Reporting and Learning System (NRLS) allows NHS employees to provide the NPSA with reports anonymously.

==== National Institute for Health and Clinical Excellence ====
The National Institute for Health and Clinical Excellence is an independent organization that produces guidance on public health, health technologies and clinical practice in England and Wales. NICE has three centers of excellence. The Centre for Public Health Excellence develops public health guidance, with information for patients on the diagnosis and treatment of specific illnesses and conditions. The Centre for Health Technology Evaluation recommends medicines and evaluates the safety and efficacy of procedures within the National Health Service. The Centre for Clinical Practice develops evidence-based clinical guidelines for clinicians on the appropriate treatment of people with specific diseases. NICE and the National Patient Safety Agency (NPSA) cooperate in risk assessment of new technology, monitoring safety incidents associated with procedures, and providing solutions if adverse outcomes are reported. In addition, NICE and NPSA share reporting in areas known as "Confidential Enquiries": maternal or infant deaths, childhood deaths to age 16, deaths in persons with mental illness, and perioperative and unexpected medical deaths.

==== Patient Safety Commissioner ====
As implementation of the Medicines and Medical Devices Act 2021 a Patient Safety Commissioner for England was appointed on 12 July 2022."Medicines and Medical Devices Act 2021: Section 1", legislation.gov.uk, The National Archives, 2021-02-11, 2021 c. 3 (s. 1),

As implementation of the Patient Safety Commissioner for Scotland Act 2023 a Patient Safety Commissioner for Scotland will be appointed by the Scottish Government.

=== United States ===
On July 29, 2005, the United States Congress established guidelines for Patient Safety Organizations under the Patient Safety Quality Act of 2005. The focus of the legislation is to provide incentives for clinicians to participate in voluntary initiatives to improve the outcomes of patient care, provide information about the underlying causes of errors in the delivery of health care, and to disseminate this information in order to speed the pace of improvement.

==== Composition ====
President Bill Clinton's Advisory Commission on Consumer Protection and Quality in the Health Care Industry completed its work on March 12, 1998. Its final report, entitled "Quality First: Better Health Care for All Americans," recommended the following characteristics of a patient safety organization:

- Be located in an entity that is credible and respected.
- Be located in an entity that does not have public or private regulatory responsibilities (i.e., it should not be a licensing, accrediting, or compliance entity).
- Have the ability to collect and analyze data.
- Have mechanisms for communicating with a variety of healthcare entities, facilities, providers, and plans.
- Be linked with initiatives for conducting interdisciplinary research and demonstrations addressing healthcare quality improvement.

==== Agency for Healthcare Research and Quality ====
In 2001, the US Congress responded to the IOM recommendation to create a National Center for Patient Safety by allocating $50 million annually for patient safety research to the Agency for Healthcare Research and Quality (AHRQ), the lead federal agency for healthcare safety. The AHRQ organizes patient safety activities, provides grants to other organizations, serves as a clearinghouse for safety information, and publishes guidelines for evidence-based or "best practices". By 2006, the National Guideline Clearinghouse (NGC) contained more than 1,700 disease-specific diagnosis, management and treatment recommendations, developed from current medical literature. The goal of the NGC is to provide health professionals and institutions, health plans and health care purchasers an accessible mechanism for obtaining objective clinical practice guidelines. Adoption of guidelines has been slowed by physician and hospital concerns that practice guidelines threaten physician autonomy and authority, fuel malpractice liability, and allow managed care insurers to curtail patient care expenditures.

Under the Secretary of Health and Human Services, the Agency for Healthcare Research and Quality coordinates the Patient Safety Task Force composed of three other agencies with regulatory and data collection responsibilities: the Centers for Disease Control and Prevention (CDC) and its National Electronic Disease Surveillance System, the Centers for Medicare and Medicaid Services (CMS) and state Quality improvement organizations, and the Food and Drug Administration (FDA).

The AHRQ, in partnership with data organizations in 37 states, sponsors the Nationwide Inpatient Sample (NIS), a database of the Healthcare Cost and Utilization Project (HCUP). The HCUP is a Federal-State-Industry partnership providing all discharge data from 994 hospitals—approximately 8 million hospital stays each year. The Nationwide Inpatient Sample is the largest all-payer inpatient care database in the United States from which national estimates of inpatient care can be derived. Using safety data from the NIS, the AHRQ has been able to provide complication rates and risk data, even for rare surgical procedures, such as bariatric surgery.

In 2005, AHRQ provided links to a compendium of 140 research articles, implementation programs and tools and products used to improve patient safety, sponsored jointly with the Department of Defense (DoD)-Health Affairs.

In 2008, AHRQ launched the AHRQ Health Care Innovations Exchange site that contains profiles of hundreds of patient safety programs that have been implemented in hospitals and other health care settings across the United States. The goal of the site is to document and share these innovations with other organizations that can adapt them in different settings, allowing the adopters to base their quality improvement plans on previously tested methods.

==== Food and Drug Administration ====
The Food and Drug Administration is an agency of the United States government that regulates food, drugs, medical devices and biological products for human use. The FDA receives medication error reports on marketed human drugs from direct contacts and manufacturer's reports, and in 1992, began monitoring medication error reports that are forwarded from the United States Pharmacopeia (USP) and the Institute for Safe Medication Practices (ISMP).

The effectiveness of the FDA's drug safety monitoring procedures was called into question after several approved drugs were shown to have serious side effects. In September 2006, an Institute of Medicine report commissioned by the FDA found that its drug safety system is limited by inadequate funding, insufficient regulatory authority, and a lack of oversight by experts free of pharmaceutical industry ties.

The FDA launched a new program in 2005 to provide drug risk information directly to the public through internet-accessible drug sheets and bulletins. The enactment of the Food and Drug Administration Amendments Act of 2007 (FDAAA), expanded the authority of the FDA over drug safety monitoring after approval and introduction for use by the public. In 2008, the FDA established a single website for both the public and the healthcare profession with access to drug safety information, including warnings, recalls, and reporting of adverse reactions, using MedWatch.

== Independent organizations ==
=== Australia ===
==== Australian Patient Safety Foundation ====
The APSF is a non-profit independent organization founded in 1989 for anesthesia error monitoring, and expanded to patient incident reporting and monitoring after results from the Quality in Australian Health Care Study (QAHCS) in 1995 prompted reaction from the public. Adverse medical events, both sentinel events (patient death and injury) and near misses (medical errors with potential harm), are reported and analyzed through its subsidiary, Patient Safety International (PSI), using a software tool, the Advanced Incident Management System (AIMS). AIMS is used in over half of Australia's hospitals, and was adopted in 2005 by the New Zealand Accident Compensation Corporation and the University of Miami Medical Group in Florida. Data remains confidential is protected from legal discovery under Australian Commonwealth Quality Assurance legislation. Patient safety information is provided by electronic newsletters.

=== Canada ===
==== Canadian Patient Safety Institute ====
The Canadian Patient Safety Institute (CPSI, Institut canadien pour la sécurité des patients) was developed in 2003 after consultations among Canadian healthcare professional organizations, provincial and territorial ministries of health and Health Canada. An independent non-profit corporation, the CPSI promotes solutions and collaboration among governments and stakeholders to improve patient safety, and has a five-year mandate. Areas of improvement are education, system innovation, communication, regulatory affairs and research. Together with the Institute For Safe Medication Practices Canada and Saskatchewan Health, a Canadian Root Cause Analysis Framework is offered to healthcare organizations to analyze the contributing factors that led to a critical incident or close call.

In April 2005, CPSI launched the Safer Healthcare Now! campaign, aimed at reducing error-related injuries by focusing on six evidence-based measures and through over 200 local organizations, based on the 100,000 lives campaign.

==== Institute for Safe Medication Practices Canada ====
The Institute for Safe Medication Practices Canada (ISMP) is an independent national non-profit agency that reviews and analyzes medication incident and near-miss reports. In collaboration with the Canadian Institute for Health Information (CIHI), and Health Canada, ISMP established the Canadian Medication Incident Prevention and Reporting System (CMIRPS) in 2003. ISMP takes the lead role in collecting reports from health practitioners, analyzing incidents, and disseminating preventative methods.

=== Egypt ===
==== Egyptian Neonatal Safety Training Network ====
The Egyptian Neonatal Safety Training Network (ENSTN) originated from a 2013 project funded by Tempus. The main objective was to develop and support an organization that would establish high standards of practice in neonatal intensive care units (NICUs), inform and train the whole range of health care workers dealing with infants (neonatologists, pediatricians, nurses, medical students, and others), and promote a culture of patient safety. More detailed goals included formulating protocols and guidelines to enhance continuity of care in NICUs, conducting research on specific aspects of patient safety, and reporting adverse events.

=== Germany ===
==== German Agency for Quality in Medicine ====
Based in Berlin, the German Agency for Quality in Medicine is a not-profit organization, which coordinates healthcare quality programs. In the field of patient safety AQUMED was one of the first German organizations calling for effective patient safety programs. The agency was co-founder of the German Coalition for Patient Safety. AQUMED established a national network of Critical Incident Reporting Systems. The institution is partner of the international High 5 Project.

==== German Coalition for Patient Safety ====
The German Coalition for Patient Safety (APS), established in 2005 and located in Bonn is a German non-profit association of organizations and individuals interested and involved in promotion of patient safety. APS' multidisciplinary working groups develop recommendations for patient safety activities in in- and outpatient healthcare institutions. The recommendations are available as open-access documents and distributed in healthcare institutions for free. APS acting together with the German Agency for Quality in Medicine is a Lead Technical Agency of the High 5 Project.

=== United Kingdom ===
==== The Health Foundation ====
Based in London, England, the Health Foundation is an independent charity that aims to improve the quality of health care for the people of the United Kingdom. The Safer Patients Initiative, one of the Foundation's quality and performance improvement programs, targets reducing medication-related adverse events and errors, reducing infections associated with intensive care units or surgery and improving organizational culture, leadership and expertise in measuring improvement. The goal of the initiative is a 50 per cent reduction in adverse events per 1,000 patient days for each site. In 2004, The Health Foundation selected four hospitals from across the UK to work on a £4.3 million patient safety improvement program. These four hospitals continue to show measurable improvements in their patient safety performance, and 16 more hospitals are being selected in 2006 to join the second phase.

==== Lancaster Patient Safety Research Unit ====
The Unit was founded in January 2008 and is a collaborative venture between the University Hospitals of Morecambe Bay NHS Trust and Lancaster University. It is funded by the UK National Health Service through the National Institute for Health and Care Research (NIHR). The unit has two aims. The first is to conduct research in patient safety. The second is to make sure that the unit's findings are used in practice, to improve the welfare of people in North Lancashire and South Cumbria and throughout the National Health Service. In June 2010 the Unit's director, Professor Andrew Smith, helped launch The Helsinki Declaration for Patient Safety in Anaesthesiology, a practical manifesto aimed at improving the safety of anesthesia care throughout Europe. He is now part of a joint European Society of Anesthesiology/European Board of Anesthesiology Task Force overseeing the implementation of the Declaration.

=== United States ===
==== ECRI and the Institute for Safe Medication Practices ====
The Institute for Safe Medication Practices (ISMP), based in suburban Philadelphia, is a federally-recognized PSO and nonprofit organization devoted to preventing medication errors and the safe use of medications. It acquired the Medication Safety Officers Society in 2013 and became an affiliate of the ECRI Institute in 2020. ISMP's medication error prevention efforts began in 1975 with a column in Hospital Pharmacy to inform healthcare professionals and others about medication error prevention. ISMP operates a voluntary practitioner error-reporting program to tabulate errors nationally, understand their causes, and share “lessons learned” with the healthcare community, known as the Medication Errors Reporting Program (MERP), operated by the United States Pharmacopeia (USP) in cooperation with ISMP. In addition, ISMP's corporate subsidiary, Med-E.R.R.S. (Medical Error Recognition and Revision Strategies), works directly and confidentially with the pharmaceutical industry to prevent errors that stem from confusing or misleading naming, labeling, packaging, and device design. The ISMP list of error-prone abbreviations is distributed nationally.

==== The Joint Commission ====
Founded in 1951, the Joint Commission (TJC, previously abbreviated as JCAHO) is an independent not-for-profit organization that evaluates and accredits nearly 15,000 healthcare organizations and programs in the United States. As an accrediting organization, it does not meet the US' legal standards for the definition of a PSO, instead serving a different role in patient safety advocacy. To be accredited by TJC, an healthcare provider must undergo an on-site survey by a Joint Commission survey team at least every three years. The scope of reviews by TJC is broad, including hospitals, home care agencies, medical equipment providers, nursing homes, rehabilitation facilities, surgical centers and medical laboratories. Passing a survey is crucial for most organizations, since accreditation by TJC is required for participation in Medicare and some state and private health care programs. Since the accreditation rate is over 90%, there have been questions raised regarding the effectiveness of these surveys.

In 1997, TJC began including outcomes and other performance data into the accreditation process (the "ORYX initiative"). Information gained allowed the Joint Commission to develop National Patient Safety Goals to promote specific improvements in patient safety. The Goals highlight problem areas in health care and describe evidence-based solutions. Examples include prevention of falls, patient identification, reducing hospital infections and pressure ulcers, and improving hospital staff communication. In addition, the Joint Commission created a "do not use" list of abbreviations in 2004 to avoid acronyms and symbols that lead to misinterpretation.

Identifying sentinel events and analyzing the root causes has been a focus of TJC since 1996; the first eight alerts were published in 1998. The Commission defines a sentinel event as "any unexpected occurrence involving death or serious physical or psychological injury, or the risk thereof." The health care facility experiencing the sentinel event is expected to complete a thorough root cause analysis, make improvements to the underlying processes, and monitor the effectiveness of the changes. Although the cause of most sentinel events is human error, changes in organizational systems will reduce the likelihood of human error in the future and protect patients from harm when human error does occur. Specific causes of sentinel events and the solutions that hospitals then used successfully to reduce risks are publicized by TJC annually. Alerts have included issues as varied as wrong site surgery, restraint deaths, transfusion and medication errors and patient abductions.

In 2005, TJC established an International Center for Patient Safety to collaborate with international patient safety organizations to identify, develop and share safety solutions, conduct joint research, and advocate public policy changes. Educational materials to help patients prevent medical errors, sentinel event alerts and other resources are provided on the internet.

==== The Leapfrog Group ====
Staggered by increasing health insurance costs, several large US companies met in 1998 to influence quality and affordability. The resulting Leapfrog Group agreed to base their purchase of health care on principles that "encourage provider quality improvement and consumer involvement". The group was officially launched in November 2000 with the initial focus provided by the 1999 Institute of Medicine report – reducing preventable medical mistakes (the report recommended that large employers leverage their purchasing power for the quality and safety of health care). The "leapfrog" concept involves encouraging rapid advances in the quality and safety of health care delivered in hospitals, by public reporting of health care quality and outcomes (hospital quality ratings) to influence consumers' choices. In 2001, the initial set of quality measures were computerized physician order entry (CPOE), evidence-based hospital referral, intensive care unit (ICU) staffing by physicians experienced in critical care medicine, and a "Leapfrog Safe Practices Score", based on the National Quality Forum endorsed Safe Practices. In 2023, Leapfrog now publicly reports nearly 50 measures in a variety of domains, including safe administration of medications, maternity care (including C-Section rates), pediatric CT dosage, responses to patient harm, and health equity.

==== United States Pharmacopeia ====
The United States Pharmacopeia (USP) is an accrediting organization that sets official standards for all prescription and over-the-counter medicines, dietary supplements, and other healthcare products manufactured and sold in the United States, but USP standards are also recognized and used in more than 130 other countries. USP operates two programs to promote patient safety. The Medication Errors Reporting Program enables healthcare professionals to report medication errors directly to USP. MEDMARX, an internet-based error and drug reaction reporting program, is designed for use in hospitals. The USP analyzes the data it receives through its reporting programs, develops professional education programs and disseminates alerts related to medication errors. The MEDMARX report released in 2007 analyzed 11,000 medication errors during surgery in 500 hospitals between 1998 and 2005. The analysis showed that medication errors that happen in the operating room or recovery areas are three times more likely to harm a patient than errors occurring in other types of hospital care. As of 2007, this was the largest known analysis of medical errors related to surgery.

== See also ==
- Adverse event
- Health informatics
- High 5s Project
- Iatrogenesis
- Iatrogenic disorder
- Improvement Science Research Network
- Medical error
- Pharmacy informatics
- Public health
