= Günter Ollenschläger =

German physician, medical editor and former professor

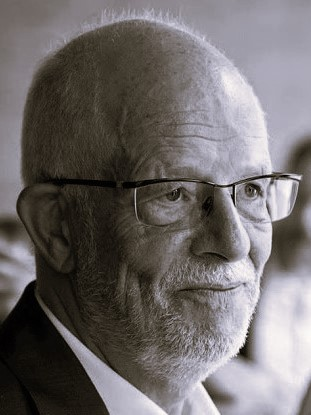
Guenter Ollenschlaeger, 2020

Günter Ollenschläger (born 3 March 1951 in Bonn) is a German physician, medical editor, and á former professor of internal medicine and clinical decision making at the University of Cologne, Faculty of Medicine.

== Biography ==
Ollenschläger is a certified pharmacist and general internist. He has a pharmaceutical doctorate from the University of Münster (1977), a medical doctorate from the University of Giessen (1982), and the venia legendi from the University of Cologne (1990).

Günter Ollenschläger worked as a research pharmacist from 1975 until 1981, and as a university physician from 1983 until 1990, working in the fields of pharmacokinetics, tumor related malnutrition, and metabolism.

Ollenschläger joined the German Medical Association as director of Continuing Medical Education from 1990 until 1995. From 1995 until 2014 he was founding head of the German Agency for Quality in Medicine. In that capacity he introduced a variety of projects to develop evidence based healthcare and knowledge management as well as patient safety in German healthcare:

- German Program for evidence based medical guidelines,
- German Guideline Clearinghouse,
- German Clearinghouse for Patient Information in order to promote scientifically based shared decision making,
- National Program for Disease Management Guidelines.
- Program for Evidence-based Patient Guidelines
- Physicians' Program for Patient Safety and Medical Error Prevention.

Ollenschläger was co-founder of the German Network for Evidence Based Medicine in 1998, and of the German Coalition for Patient Safety in 2005. He was co-founder and Founding Chairman of the Guidelines International Network in 2002. He was chief editor of the German Journal for Evidence and Quality in Healthcare from 1995 until 2015. From 2015 until 2016 Günter Ollenschläger was editor-in-chief of the medical encyclopedia DEXIMED, the German version of the Norwegian e-book NEL. In 2019 Günter Ollenschläger was co-founder of Health Literacy Network Germany DNGK.

== Awards ==
- Max-Rubner-Award – German Nutrition Society (1990)
- Corresponding Member, German College of General Practitioners and Family Physicians DEGAM (1994)
- Berlin Health Award (1998)
- German Health Award (1999)
- Richard-Merten-Award (1999)
- German Healthcare Quality Award (2001)
- Honorary Patron - Guidelines International Network (2005)
- Honorary Chairman - German Network for Evidence Based Medicine (2013)
- Editor-in-Chief-Emeritus, German Journal for Evidence and Quality in Healthcare (2015)
- Honorary Member - German Network for Evidence Based Medicine (2016)
