= Zeitschrift für Evidenz, Fortbildung und Qualität im Gesundheitswesen =

- Discipline: Healthcare
- Language: German, English
- Edited by: Gabriele Meyer

Publication details
- Former name(s): Zeitschrift für ärztliche Fortbildung; Zeitschrift für ärztliche Fortbildung und Qualitätssicherung
- History: 1904-present
- Publisher: Elsevier (Germany)

Standard abbreviations
- ISO 4: Z. Evidenz Fortbild. Qual. Gesundheitswes.

Indexing
- ISSN: 1865-9217
- LCCN: 2008243979

Links
- Journal homepage

Zeitschrift für Evidenz, Fortbildung und Qualität im Gesundheitswesen (English: The Journal of Evidence and Quality in Health Care) is a bilingual German and English language peer-reviewed medical journal published by Elsevier Germany. It was established in 1904 as the Zeitschrift für ärztliche Fortbildung (German Journal for Continuous Medical Education) by Ernst von Bergmann. ZEFQ is the organ of various organisations working in the fields of evidence-based medicine, patient empowerment, patient safety, and quality management in healthcare:. Among these are:

- Association of the Scientific Medical Societies in Germany (AWMF),
- Federal Joint Committee (G-BA),
- German Agency for Quality in Medicine (AEZQ),
- German Coalition for Patient Safety (APS)
- German Cochrane Centre,
- German Network for Evidence Based Medicine (DNEbM),
- Institute for Quality and Efficiency in Healthcare (IQWIG),
- Guidelines International Network (G-I-N),
- AQUA-Institute on Applied Quality Improvement and Research in Health Care,
- Drug Commission of the German Medical Association (AkdAE),
- German Society for Quality Management in Healthcare (GQMG),
- Medical Advisory Service of the German Health Insurance (MDS),

ZEFQ's editor in chief was Günter Ollenschläger from 1995 until 12/2015, succeeded by Gabriele Meyer

== See also ==
- List of periodicals published by Elsevier
