= Ludwig Güterbock =

- Born: October 23, 1814; Berlin, Kingdom of Prussia
- Died: February 28, 1895 (aged 80); Berlin, German Empire
- Education: University of Berlin
- Occupations: Physician and a general practitioner

Ludwig Güterbock (also spelled Gueterbock; 23 October 1814 – 28 February 1895) was a German physician and a general practitioner from Berlin. He edited Johann Lukas Schönlein’s widely read Klinische Vorträge (Clinical Lectures) and contributed reports to the 19th-century annual surveys of medical progress at the University of Berlin.

== Biography ==
Ludwig Güterbock was born on 23 October 1814 in Berlin, Germany to a Jewish family. He studied medicine at the University of Berlin and received his M.D. there in 1837. At the same year, he wrote his thesis named "De pure et granulatione". Güterbock died in Berlin on 28 February 1895.

== Works ==
Güterbock wrote several essays for the medical journals, and was one of the collaborators on the "Jahresberichte über die Fortschritte der Gesammten Medicin in Allen Ländern." (Annual report on the achievements and progress in medicine as a whole).

Beginning in the early 1840s Güterbock edited and issued parts of Schönlein’s klinische Vorträge in dem Charité-Krankenhause zu Berlin (Schönlein's clinical lectures at the Charité Hospital in Berlin), a compilation of Johann Lukas Schönlein's clinical lectures at the Charité. The work went through several editions.

== Literature ==
- Güterbock, Ludwig: De pure et granulatione by Ludwig Güterbock (digital copy)
- Gallensteinconcremente in der Harnblase (digital copy)
