= Saccia =

Saccia may refer to:

- SACCIA Safe Communication, concept in crisis management
- Ipomoea, largest genus in the plant family Convolvulaceae, with the synonym Saccia
