= SACCIA Safe Communication =

SACCIA Safe Communication is a competence framework designed to reduce communication-related risks in high-stakes environments. Developed by Swiss communication scientist Annegret Hannawa, the SACCIA model identifies five key interpersonal communication competencies that ensure a shared understanding under conditions of pressure. It is applied across sectors, including healthcare, aviation, energy, emergency response and crisis management.

== Origin and development ==
=== Background ===
Communication failures have been identified as a significant contributing factor to preventable harm in high-risk sectors. In healthcare, studies estimate that over 43 million patients are affected annually by avoidable medical errors, with poor communication implicated in up to 80% of serious adverse events. In aviation, communication issues have likewise been identified as contributing factors in a substantial proportion of accidents and incidents. Despite the use of technical systems and standardised protocols, problems such as unclear messaging, misinterpretation, and breakdowns in hierarchical communication continue to pose operational risks.

=== Development ===
The SACCIA model was developed from Hannawa’s research into how interpersonal communication contributes to adverse patient outcomes, addressing a lack of structured analyses of communication factors. Her work found that many errors stem from a lack of shared understanding among care participants. These findings led to the SACCIA model, which defines safe communication as interpersonal competencies to prevent communication-related harm.

== SACCIA model ==
SACCIA Safe Communication Competencies

SACCIA is an acronym denoting five communication competencies. The model is evidence-based, cross-sectoral, and applicable to various professions and industries:

- Sufficiency – Obtaining, transmitting, and confirming all relevant information to reduce safety risks from information gaps.
- Accuracy – Verifying that information is correct and understood as intended, including confirmation of facts, figures, and meanings.
- Clarity – Using explicit, unambiguous language to minimise the risk of confusion or misinterpretation.
- Contextualisation – Identifying and addressing situational factors that may hinder understanding, such as incompatible goals, status differences, prior conflicts, timing issues, environmental distractions, or differing cultural norms.
- Interpersonal Adaptation – Adjusting communication in real time to meet each other’s emotional, cognitive, or linguistic needs.

=== Applications ===
Applications of the SACCIA model span multiple high-risk sectors. Its most extensive use has been in healthcare, where it has informed professional education, patient safety strategies, error disclosure protocols, and interprofessional communication. Structured integration of the competencies has been linked to reduced preventable harm. Empirical evidence includes its use in Swiss hospital communication during the COVID-19 pandemic, in emergency medicine and in mountain rescue operations. The model has also been applied in other crisis management contexts (e.g., climate coordination), aviation and the energy sector.

== Institutional recognition and implementation ==
The SACCIA model has been incorporated into national and international safety structures. It has been referenced by the World Health Organization and applied by health ministries in Switzerland, Germany, and Iceland. Training programs by organisations such as the German Coalition for Patient Safety (Aktionsbündnis Patientensicherheit) make use of the model. SACCIA has also been presented at international forums, including the Ministerial Patient Safety Summit, and has informed research supported by the Swiss National Science Foundation and Germany’s Innovationsfonds. In addition, it serves as the competence framework of the European Institute for Safe Communication.

== Literature (selection) ==
- Hannawa, Annegret F.; Wu, Albert; Juhasz, Robert (2017). New Horizons in Patient Safety: Case Studies for Physicians. Berlin/Boston: De Gruyter. ISBN 978-3-11-045300-3.
- Hannawa, Annegret F.; Jönitz, Günther (2017). Neue Wege für die Patientensicherheit: Sichere Kommunikation: Evidenzbasierte Kernkompetenzen mit Fallbeispielen aus der medizinischen Praxis. Berlin/Boston: De Gruyter. ISBN 978-3-11-053557-0.
- Hannawa, Annegret F. (2018). SACCIA — Sichere Kommunikation: Fünf Kernkompetenzen Mit Fallbeispielen Aus der Pflegerischen Praxis (in German) (1st ed.). Berlin/Boston: De Gruyter. ISBN 978-3-11-056073-2.
- Hannawa, Annegret F (2018-06-01). "SACCIA Safe Communication: Five core competencies for safe and high-quality care". Journal of Patient Safety and Risk Management. 23 (3): 99–107. doi:10.1177/2516043518774445. ISSN 2516-0435.
- Hannawa, Annegret F.; Wendt, Anne L.; Day, Lisa J. (2018). New horizons in patient safety: evidence-based core competencies with case studies from nursing practice: Safe communication. Berlin/Boston: De Gruyter. ISBN 978-3-11-045485-7.

== See also ==
- Patient safety
- Medical error
- Aviation safety
- Crisis communication
- Human error
