= German Network for Evidence Based Medicine =

German Network for Evidence Based Medicine(DNEbM)
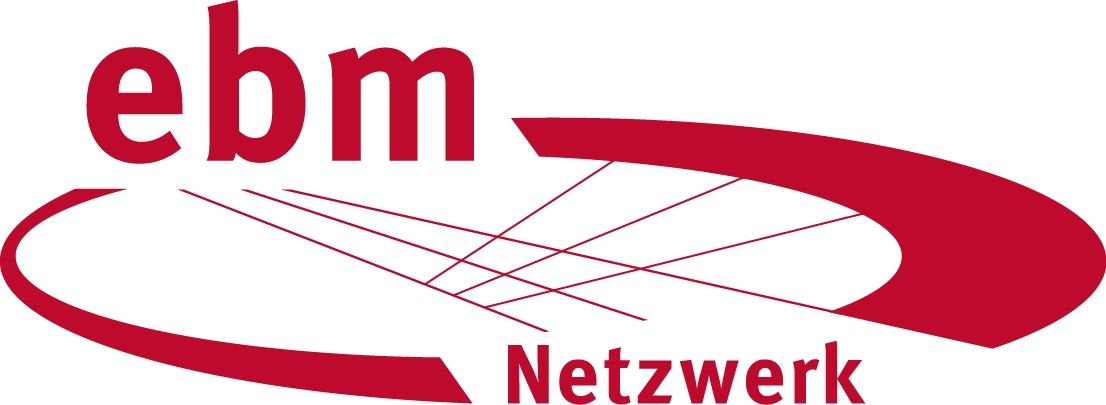
- Abbreviation: DNEbM
- Formation: 1998
- Type: German NPO
- Purpose: Promoting evidence-based health care
- Headquarters: Berlin, Germany
- Region served: Germany, Austria, Switzerland
- Official language: German
- Affiliations: International Society for Evidence Based Healthcare
- Website: www.dnebm.de

The German Network for Evidence based Medicine (in German: Deutsches Netzwerk Evidenzbasierte Medizin DNEbM) is a scientific nonprofit association of individuals and institutions promoting the quality of patient care and disease prevention by applying the principles of evidence-based healthcare (EbHC) - in special dentistry (EbD), medicine (EbM), nursing (EbN), pharmacy, physiotherapy - in the countries of German language.

Being a multiprofessional community, DNEbM provides an interdisciplinary discussion and communication forum for health care providers, patients and consumers, health care scientists, managers and political decision makers regarding all aspects of EbM&N/EbHC.

== Membership ==
The network's membership consists of nearly 800 individuals and more than 50 institutions working in the field of evidence-based healthcare or endorsing it, among them the German Cochrane Center, the German Agency for Quality in Medicine (AEZQ/AQuMed), and the IQWIG.

== Organization ==
DNEbM is a charity, according to German law, with a board of trustees, whose members are elected by the annual general meeting every second year. The board’s executive committee, comprising chair, 1st and 2nd vice-chair, treasurer, oversee the day-to-day activities, organized by the Berlin-based secretariat (executive officer, administrative secretary, webmaster).

== Mission ==
The network's aims and goals are to

- promote the translation of EbM&N/EbHC concepts, methods and processes into everyday life – especially in clinical practice;
- inform its membership about state of the art and ongoing development in the field of EbM&N/EbHC;
- promote the scientific discussion and dissemination by organizing and endorsing working groups as well as scientific and educational meetings, and by entertaining a peer-reviewed journal;
- advance professional development in these fields, f.e. by means of offering Train-the-Trainer courses;
- facilitate the further development, dissemination and application of EbM&N/EbHC principles, concepts, methods, techniques.

== Activities ==
DNEbM’s annual scientific congresses have been the key event for individuals and organisations interested in EbHC/EbM&N science and education. Presentations are peer reviewed, and – if accepted – published in the bi-lingual open access journal eGMS.

The peer-reviewed German Journal for Evidence and Quality in Healthcare, founded in 1904 as Zeitschrift für ärztliche Fortbildung, is DNEbM’s official organ. ZEFQ is also the German-language organ of the Guidelines International Network G-I-N.

Main carrier for the network’s everyday knowledge management and information transfer is DNEbM’s website www.dnebm.de, offering news services as well as open access and members-only information and supported by social networking facilities such as Facebook and Twitter.

Since the network’s foundation, DNEbM members, working in organizations and committees being responsible for defining health care benefits as well as for patient safety programmes, have been promoting EbHC. Furthermore, the network's discussion, training, and information programmes were helpful in disseminating EbHC ideas in Germany and Austria. Over a decade methods, challenges and barriers of EbHC tools such as systematic reviews, guidelines have been discussed within the framework of DNEbM. Members of the network edited the first German-language textbooks on EbM/EbN. A national EbM curriculum for medical postgraduate education and professional development is another of the deliveries, developed within the DNEbM.

Austrian members of the network initiated a special website on EbM in Austria in 2010.

Recent activities focus on the topics “conflict of interest”, “individualized medicine”, “implementation of clinical practice guidelines”.

== DNEbM Awards ==
In 2008 DNEbM established the David Sackett Award with D.S.’s endorsement. The DSA is for ambitious and creative scientific EbHC / EbM / EbN projects that engage people with developments in that field on a regional, national or international scale. In 2009 the DNEbM Journalist Prize was added.

== Affiliations ==
Since 2004, DNEbM has been member of the German Association of Scientific Medical Societies AWMF, umbrella organization of the more than 150 German "learned societies".
