= Clinical handover =

Clinical handover (patient handover or handover) is the transfer of professional responsibility and accountability for some or all aspects of care for a patient, or group of patients, to another person or professional group on a temporary or permanent basis.

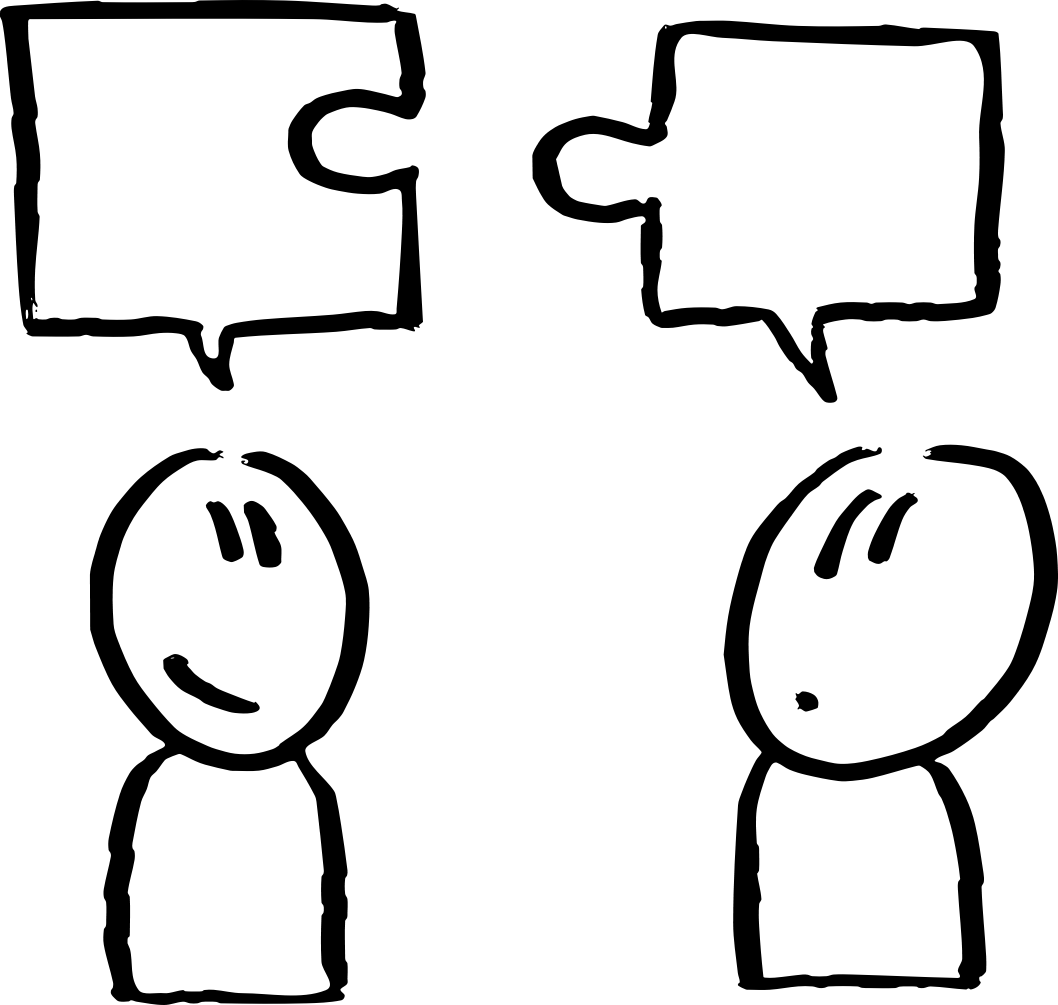
Timely clinical handover to the appropriate person(s) is essential to ensuring patient safety and delivery of the right care

When critical clinical information emerges or there is a risk to patient care, timely communication of this information to the appropriate person(s) is essential to ensuring patient safety and delivery of the right care. Failure in handover is a major source of preventable patient harm. Clinical handover is an international concern and Australia, the United Kingdom and other countries have developed risk reduction recommendations.

It is important to define and agree on the minimum information content for clinical handovers relevant to a service or discipline. It may be helpful to consider what clinical and non-clinical information is time critical or significant to patient care, such as:

- New critical diagnostic or test results that require a change to care
- Changes in a patient’s physical and psychological condition, including unexpected deterioration or development of complications
- Follow-up communication following a review of results.

Use of structured handover tools can help to provide a framework for communicating the minimum information content for clinical handovers. This may be supported by electronic clinical handover templates.

Examples of clinical handover tools to help structure handover:

- ISBAR (Identify, Situation, Background, Assessment, Recommendation)
- SBAR (Situation, Background, Assessment, Recommendation)
- SHARED (Situation, History, Assessment, Risk, Expectation, Documentation)
- I PASS the BATON (Introduction, Patient, Assessment, Situation, Safety concerns, Background, Actions, Timing, Ownership, Next).

== See also ==
- Change-of-shift report (nursing)
- GP Liaison
