= National Association of Statutory Health Insurance Physicians =

National Association of Statutory Health Insurance Physicians (NASHIP)
- Formation: January 1, 1931; 95 years ago
- Type: Professional association
- Purpose: self organisation, lobby group, contractor with health insurance funds
- Headquarters: Berlin, Germany
- Location: Germany
- Members: 17
- Official language: German
- President: Andreas Gassen, MD since 2014
- Key people: Board Vice Chair Stephan Hofmeister, MD; Thomas Kriedel, PhD, Board member
- Website: http://www.kbv.de/

The National Association of Statutory Health Insurance Physicians (NASHIP) (German Kassenärztliche Bundesvereinigung, KBV), based in Berlin, is the co-ordinating body of all 17 State Associations of Statutory Health Insurance Physicians in Germany. As of 2018, it represented about 175,000 office-based physicians' and psychotherapists in Germany. NASHIP is co-owner of the medical journal Deutsches Ärzteblatt and of the German Agency for Quality in Medicine, a member of the Guidelines International Network - together with the German Medical Association.

== Organization ==
The National Association of Statutory Health Insurance Physicians (NASHIP) or "Kassenärztliche Bundesvereinigung (KBV)", based in Berlin, is the co-ordinating body of all 17 State Associations of Statutory Health Insurance Physicians in Germany. As of 2018, it represented about 175,000 office-based physicians' and psychotherapists. NASHIP is a body under public law and part of the medical self-government in Germany. It consists of a governing board of 3 directors, elected for a six-year term by a delegates’ meeting of 60 representatives of the regional ASHIPs.

As of 2020, the chairman is Andreas Gassen, in charge of care provided by medical specialists, vice Chairman Stephan Hofmeister, responsible for services provided by general practitioners and Thomas Kriedel, expert in the digitalization of public healthcare and economics. NASHIP has about 370 employees.

== Activities ==
The organization lobbies for office-based physicians (physicians in private practice) and physiotherapists in legislative processes: As a member of the Federal Joint Committee it is one of the organizations, which determines the benefit catalogue.

NASHIP makes contracts with the national confederations of the health insurance funds and other parties of the health care sector devising and revising physician fee schedule, the so-called "Uniform Assessment Standard". and thus physician salaries. As of 2016, these vary enormously.

NAHIP does not publish its budget or annual reports, and has been criticized for its non-transparency.

== History ==
NASHIP´s precursor was the "Kassenärztliche Vereinigung Deutschlands" (Association of Statutory Health Insurance Physicians), founded in 1931 to settle disputes between physicians and health insurance funds. As early as 1935, all managing directors of the Association of Statutory Health Insurance Physicians were summoned for ideological training in a "School for leadership for the German medical profession" (Führerschule der deutschen Ärzteschaft) in Alt Rehse, initially under the direction of Hans Deuschl. After 1936, the school belonged to the Association of Statutory Health Insurance Physicians; between 1935 and 1941 an estimated 10,000 to 12,000 physicians were indoctrinated in courses there, lasting from 7–10 days.

As of 2018, NASHIPs role in the Third Reich was still to be investigated. An interim report of academic study by the Center of Antisemitic Studies at the TU Berlin was expected to be published in December 2019.

== Criticism ==
In 2012, a rare glimpse on NASHIPs inappropriate financial transactions showed, that it had offered a credit of 56 million Euro to its own real estate company. In 2012, then Director Andreas Köhler made headlines with a salary of 350,000 Euro, and retiring in 2014 with 270,000 Euro.

As of 2015, infighting, intrigues and power struggles caused such dysfunction, that a law was enacted to allow closing doctors offices in areas of high physician density ("überversorgte Gebiete") and allowing physicians to open a new office in medically underserved areas.

In 2016, governmental oversight ordered NASHIP to reverse inappropriate pension payments to leading figures.
