= Improvement Science Research Network =

The Improvement Science Research Network (ISRN) is a research network for academics and physicians who are conducting studies in the new medical field of improvement science.

Founded in 2009, ISRN is part of the Institute for Integration of Medicine and Science at the University of Texas Health Science Center San Antonio (UTHSCSA). It is housed in the UTHSCSA School of Nursing. The principal investigator is Kathleen R. Stevens, EdD, MS, RN, ANEF, FAAN). ISRN is supported by the National Institutes of Health (NIH) through funds from the American Recovery and Reinvestment Act.

ISRN Membership is open to healthcare researchers, academic and clinical scientists, clinicians, clinical leaders, administrators, and those with a specific interest in patient safety and improvement research.

== Services ==
ISRN provides a national laboratory for investigators from across broad geographical range to study improvement, healthcare delivery systems, dissemination, implementation, translation, safety, and patient outcomes.

ISRN infrastructure supports virtual collaboration in the conduct of network studies through direct engagement of study partners and sites, network study principal investigators, and centralized support. ISRN is registered with the Agency for Healthcare Research and Quality as an active PBRN.

== Improvement science ==
improvement science is an emerging field that shares common aspects with implementation science, translational science, healthcare delivery science, and knowledge translation. These fields are similar in their focus on transforming what is learned from research into common practice to improve care processes and outcomes. "Improvement science" is proposed as the most inclusive term in this list and is proposed as a specialty within health services research.

== Terminology ==
The ISRN framework and the Stevens Star Model of Knowledge Transformation (Stevens, 2015) are reflected in an international effort to create common terminology of organizational interventions for implementing best evidence-based practices into health practices, systems and policies.

To date, this effort resulted in development of a simplified model of interventions to promote and integrate evidence into health practices, systems, and policies (Colquhoun, et al., 2013) and a review of classification schemes for these interventions (Lokker, C., et al., 2015).

== Research priorities ==
ISRN has established national stakeholder consensus on research priorities that distinguish it from other practice-based research networks (Stevens & Ovretveit, 2013). These priorities highlight gaps in improvement knowledge as identified by clinical and academic scholars, leaders, and change agents across major healthcare disciplines. The research priorities guide decisions about the direction of ISRN discovery and dissemination efforts toward ISRN-sponsored knowledge in each of the following domains of improvement science:

- Coordination and Transitions of Care – this category emphasizes strategies for improvement to care processes in specific clinical conditions. At this time, care coordination and transitions of care are the key clinical focus. Examples of Research Issues: Team performance, medication reconciliation, discharge for prevention of early readmission, patient centered care, measurement of targeted outcomes.
- High Performing Clinical Systems and Microsystems Approaches to Improvement – this category emphasizes structure and process in clinical care and healthcare as complex adaptive systems. Examples of Research Issues: Frontline provider engagement, factors related to uptake, adoption and implementation, sustaining improvements and improvement processes.
- Evidence-Based Quality Improvement and Best Practice – this category emphasizes closing the gap between knowledge and practice through transforming knowledge and designating and implementing best practices. Examples of Research Issues: Develop and critically appraise clinical practice guidelines, adoption and spread of best practices, customization of best practices, institutional elements in adoption, defining best practice in absence of evidence, consumers in EBP, technology-based integration.
- Learning Organizations and Culture of Quality and Safety – this category emphasizes human factors and other aspects of a system related to organizational culture and commitment to quality and safety. Examples of Research Issues: Unit based nursing quality teams, protecting strategy from culture, engendering values and beliefs for culture of patient safety.

== Governance ==
ISRN is affiliated with the PBRN Resource Center of the Institute for Integration of Medicine and Science, University of Texas Health Science Center San Antonio. Through this alignment, ISRN addresses "Translational Science 3" (T3) phases of moving knowledge into practice.

ISRN is advised by the ISRN Steering Council. The Steering Council is composed of twelve healthcare experts, leaders, and stakeholders from both private and public agencies and facilities. .

ISRN activities are supported by a coordinating team housed in the School of Nursing.

== Events ==
=== Web events ===
The first session of the ISRN web event series, "The Way Forward: An Introduction to Improvement Science", was held in June 2010.

Presented by Jack Needleman, PhD, FAAN, and Kathleen R. Stevens, this introductory session showcased the activities of the ISRN as a catalyst for change. The discussion included definition of improvement science, exploration of the overlapping paradigms of improvement science, translational science, and implementation science and explanation of the need and context for improvement research and a discussion of improvement science research methods, study opportunities, and ISRN research results.

== See also ==
- ACE STAR Model of Knowledge Transformation
