= German Medical Association =

The German Medical Association (GMA) (German: Bundesärztekammer, BÄK), founded in 1947 and based in Berlin, is the co-ordinating body of physicians' self-regulation in Germany. It co-ordinates the activities of the 17 State Chambers of Physicians which are legally responsible for regulation of the medical profession. As of 31 December 2007, the GMA represents the professional interests of the more than 400,000 physicians. The German Medical Association is co-owner of the medical journal Deutsches Ärzteblatt and of the German Agency for Quality in Medicine, a member of the Guidelines International Network—together with the National Association of Statutory Health Insurance Physicians.

== Purpose ==
The purpose of the GMA is to protect, promote and maintain the health and safety of the patient and the community by ensuring proper standards in the practice of medicine.

It regulates:

- ethical and professional obligations of doctors,
- postgraduate training,
- continuous medical education and professional development,
- and quality assurance and quality promotion in healthcare.

== Memberships ==
The German Medical Association is a member of the World Medical Association and of the Standing Committee of European Doctors
