= Annegret Hannawa =

German communication scientist

Prof. Annegret Friederike Hannawa
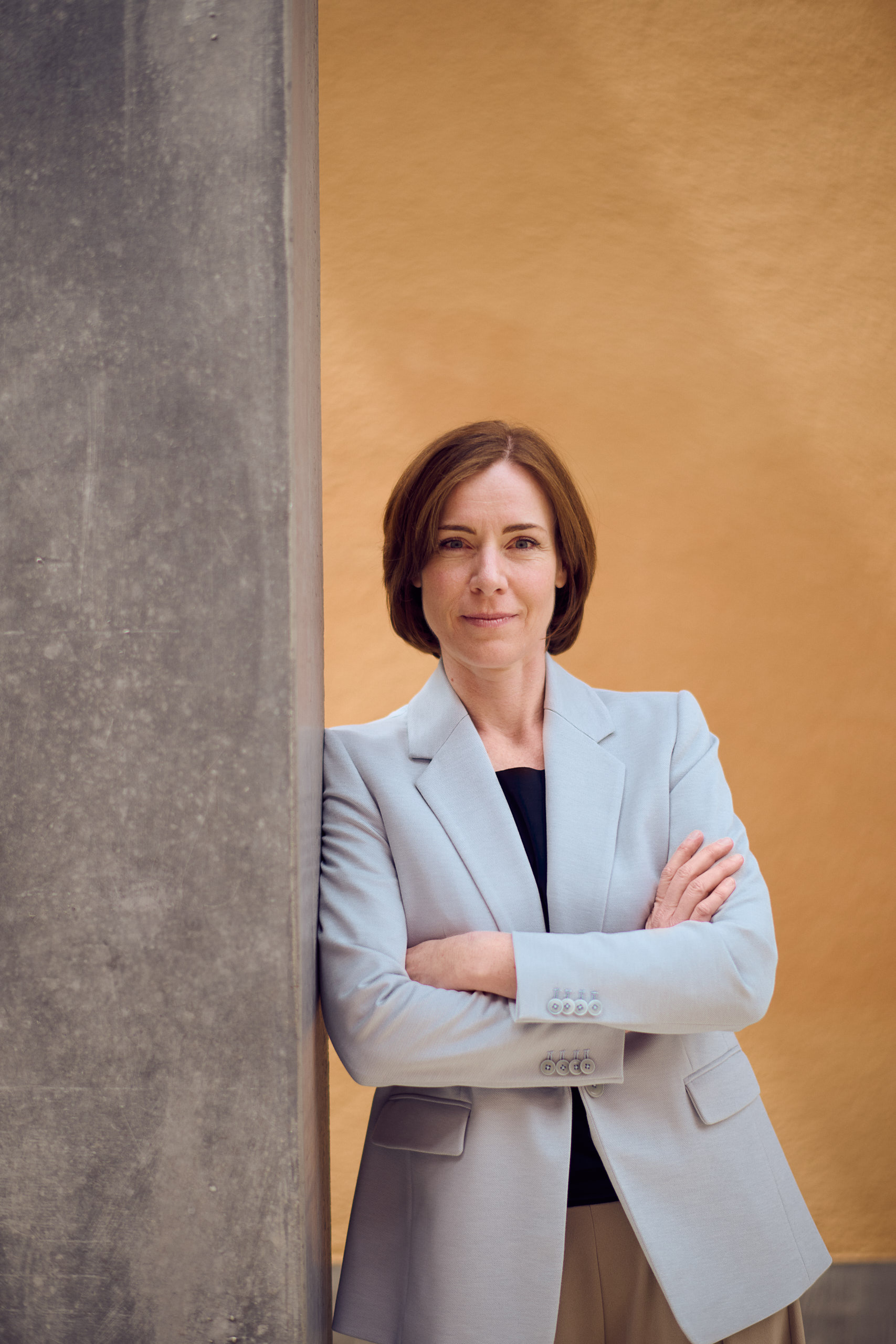
- Born: 27 April 1979 (age 47); Konstanz, Germany
- Education: San Diego State University; Arizona State University
- Scientific career
- Fields: Safe Communication, Patient Safety, Healthcare quality
- Institutions: Lugano, Università della Svizzera italiana (USI)
- Website: annegrethannawa.com

Annegret Friederike Hannawa (born 27 April 1979 in Konstanz, Germany) is a German communication scientist and director of the Center for the Advancement of Healthcare Quality and Safety (CAHQS) at the Università della Svizzera italiana in Lugano. She presides the European Institute for Safe Communication (EISCOM).

== Studies ==
Hannawa studied interpersonal communication at San Diego State University, where she earned a master's degree in 2006.

She then began her Ph.D. studies in health communication at Arizona State University. Her dissertation developed a communication science model of "Physician Mistake Disclosure." In 2009, Hannawa received her doctorate from ASU.

== Academic career and work ==
Hannawa received her first academic appointment at Wake Forest University (WFU) in Winston-Salem, North Carolina, USA, as tenure-track assistant professor in the Department of Communication Studies. In 2011, she was appointed to a tenure-track professorship in health communication and research methodology at the Faculty of Communication, Università della Svizzera italiana (USI, Lugano, Switzerland), where she still works today.

Hannawa conducted a grant-funded international congress entitled "Communicating Medical Error (COME)" in 2013. The conference evolved into the nonprofit organization "ISCOME Global Center for the Advancement of Communication Science in Healthcare." To date, Hannawa leads this research association as its founding president-elect. Also in 2013, she received funding from the Swiss National Science Foundation (SNSF) to develop evidence-based communication guidelines for disclosing medical errors to patients. In 2019, the Swiss Federal Office of Public Health tasked her to analyze the pandemic communication surrounding Covid-19.

In 2016, Hannawa founded an interdisciplinary Center for the Advancement of Healthcare Quality and Safety (CAHQS) at the Università della Svizzera italiana. In the same year, she was elected as a scientific expert to the ELSI Advisory Board of the Swiss Personalized Health Network (SPHN). In addition, she received honorary titles as Associate Faculty at Johns Hopkins University Bloomberg School of Public Health (Baltimore, Maryland, USA) and Cardiff University School of Medicine (Wales, United Kingdom).

In 2016, Hannawa was awarded the "Jozien Bensing Research Award". In 2023, the government or the Swiss Canton of Uri recognized her with an appointment as Ambassador. In June 2024, she founded the European Institute for Safe Communication (EISCOM), bringing together science and practice to protect professionals in aviation, healthcare, emergency services, energy, and crisis management from communication failures in high-risk situations. In June 2025, Hannawa received the global award for applied research by the International Communication Association (ICA). For the first time in history, this prestigious award went to a scientist in Switzerland.

== Research ==
SACCIA Safe Communication Competencies

Hannawa's research initially focused on how "safe communication" can prevent harmful errors in everyday clinical practice and ensure high-quality healthcare, particularly in the digital age. In her scientific research, she evaluated over 1000 cases of harm in hospitals. According to her statistics, 53 patients die every day in Germany as a result of treatment errors; up to 80 percent of these cases can be traced back to unsafe communication. From this evidence, Hannawa developed a science-based "SACCIA Safe Communication" model that conveys five competencies that can help people build resilience against human communication failures in high-risk situations. Hannawa has meanwhile extended her SACCIA research to further high-risk contexts, such as Covid-19, airborne rescues, energy crisis, climate change, and societal crisis resilience.

== Awards ==
- Global Applied Research Award of the International Communication Association (ICA), 2025.
- Jozien Bensing Research Award, 2016.

== See also ==
- Safety
- Patient safety
- Medical error
- Human error
- Interpersonal communication
- Crisis communication
- Healthcare quality
- Health Communication
- Digitization
