= High 5s Project =

WHO patient safety collaboration

The High 5s Project is an international patient safety collaboration launched by the World Health Organization (WHO) in 2006. The project addresses concerns about patient safety around the world.

The High 5s name derives from the Project's original intent to significantly reduce the frequency of 5 challenging patient safety problems in 5 countries over 5 years.

== Organization ==
The High 5s Project was initiated by the countries Australia, Canada, Germany, the Netherlands, New Zealand, the United Kingdom, and the United States. France, Saudi Arabia, and Singapore have subsequently joined the Project. All the countries set up Lead Technical Agencies for the coordination of national project activities.

The project is supported by the U.S. Agency for Healthcare Research and Quality, WHO, and the Commonwealth Fund and is coordinated by the WHO Collaborating Centre for Patient Safety which is led by The Joint Commission and Joint Commission International.

== Goals ==
- To build national and global networks.
- To achieve measurable and sustainable reductions in challenging patient safety problems.
- Implementations of standardized operating protocols.

== Activities ==
The major components of the High 5s Project include the development and implementation of problem-specific standardized operating protocols (SOPs); creation of an impact evaluation strategy; a collection of data, reporting, and analysis; and the establishment of an electronic collaborative learning community.

The High 5s Project is designed to generate learning that will permit the continuous refinement and improvement of the SOPs, as well as assessment of the feasibility and success of implementing standardized approaches to specific patient safety problems across multiple countries and cultures. The achievement of the Project goals is expected to provide valuable lessons and new knowledge to support the advancement of patient safety around the world.

Five SOPs have been developed to support the Project. These SOPs address:

1. Assuring medication accuracy at transitions in care
2. Managing concentrated injectable medicines
3. Performance of correct procedure at correct body site
4. Communication failures during patient handovers
5. Addressing health care-associated infection.

The impact evaluation strategy includes on-site observation of SOP implementation; the use of SOP-specific performance measures; use of an event analysis framework to identify occurrences that may represent SOP failures; and baseline and periodic hospital safety culture surveys.

== See also ==
- Patient safety organization
- Agency for Healthcare Research and Quality (AHRQ) in the USA
- German Agency for Quality in Medicine
- German Coalition for Patient Safety
- National Patient Safety Agency in England
