= GP Liaison =

General Practice Hospital Liaison

A GP Liaison (also: General Practice Liaison Officer or GPLO) is a manager or management team facilitating a close working relationship between hospitals and general practitioners (GPs) in the community.

GP Liaison positions exist in several countries, including the United Kingdom, Australia and New Zealand, in public and private hospitals. The overarching aim is to improve the patient journey across primary care and secondary care and ensure patients receive timely care.

GP Liaison Officers are often health professionals, including general practitioners, and assist with building and enhancing pathways, linkages, programs and services between the hospital system, general practice and primary health care. They provide advice and support to GPs and other healthcare professionals to address communication gaps and optimise clinical handover, including referrals and discharge communication. In the public sector, one of the aims is to reduce unnecessary health care.

In contrast, GPLOs in private hospitals often have role in promoting services with the aim to facilitate referrals to the health service.

== Benefits ==
International literature indicates that GP Liaison positions in the public sector have emerged as change management roles in influencing outcomes including:

- Reducing patient hospital usage
- Improving communication between primary and hospital sectors
- Increasing the skills of primary care teams and reducing workload burden of health professionals through supporting a coordinated, integrated collaborative service delivery model
- Reducing long patient waiting times for hospital outpatient appointments
- Improving treatment compliance
- Reducing unnecessary referrals to the hospital sector.

== Collaboration ==
In Tasmania, Australia, all regions of the state have appointed GPs as GPLOs tasked with improving communication between hospitals and community health services. The Tasmanian General Practice and Primary Care Unit assists with coordination and collaboration across Tasmania's GPLO resources to ensure a statewide perspective and consistent access to health services.

In Queensland, Australia, GPLOs work collaboratively through the multidisciplinary Queensland General Practice Liaison Network. The network provides expert direction and advice to the state public hospital sector on strategic matters relating to integrating the patient journey of care across the interface between general practice and hospital care.

Queensland's GP Liaison network was established in 2008 by General Practice Queensland. In 2012, Queensland Health funded 20 GP Liaison positions in the largest public hospitals under a state election commitment. Over the years the network has gradually expanded. Most (but not all) public hospitals in Queensland have a GP Liaison position. GPLOs have developed working relationships and partnerships across the health system, facilitating collaborative models of care, optimising resource use and minimising low value care.
