= German Agency for Quality in Medicine =

German Agency for Quality in Medicine AEZQ
- Formation: 1995
- Type: German NPO
- Purpose: Promoting Evidence based Health care, Patient Safety & Medical Guidelines
- Headquarters: Berlin, Germany
- Region served: Germany
- Chairman: Frank Ulrich Montgomery & Andreas Gassen
- Parent organization: German Medical Association & Nat. Ass. for Statutory Health Insurance Physicians
- Affiliations: Guidelines International Network, German Network for Evidence Based Medicine
- Website: www.aezq.de

The German Agency for Quality in Medicine (AEZQ) (German: Ärztliches Zentrum für Qualität in der Medizin, ÄZQ), established in 1995 and located in Berlin, co-ordinates healthcare quality programmes with special focus on evidence-based medicine, medical guidelines, patient empowerment, patient safety programs, and quality management.

AEZQ is a non-profit organization owned by the German Medical Association and the National Association of Statutory Health Insurance Physicians.

== Activities ==
AEZQ initiated several quality programs for the German healthcare system:

It established the German Program for evidence based medical guidelines in the late 90s. Based upon guideline standards from the Scottish Intercollegiate Guideline Network and referring to experiences from the National Guideline Clearinghouse in the US, the agency founded a German Guideline Clearinghouse aiming at best practice in guideline production.

In 1998 AEZQ was co-founder of the German Network for Evidence Based Medicine.

The organization established the German Clearinghouse for Patient Information in order to promote scientifically based shared decision making in 1999.

In 2002, the agency set up the National Program for Disease Management Guidelines.

The development of reliable and consumer information is integral part of this guideline program.

AEZQ was co-founder of the Guidelines International Network in 2002 - under the leadership of Günter Ollenschläger, collaborating with other national healthcare quality agencies like the US Agency for Healthcare Research and Quality, the UK National Institute for Health and Clinical Excellence, the Australian National Health and Medical Research Council.

In the field of patient safety AEZQ was one of the first German organisations calling for effective patient safety programs. The agency was co-founder of the German Coalition for Patient Safety. AEZQ established a national web of Critical Incident Reporting Systems. The institution is partner of the international High 5 Project.

In 2010 the agency set up a Digital Library for physicians and other interested health professionals and lays - the German Medical eLibrary (www.arztbibliothek.de) - for reinforcement of reliable and unbiased knowledge management in healthcare.

AEZQ entertained the administrative offices of the Guidelines International Network, and of the German Network for Evidence Based Medicine until 2013. It hosts the editorial office of the German Journal for Evidence and Quality in Healthcare.
