= Johann Lukas Schönlein =

German naturalist (1793–1864)

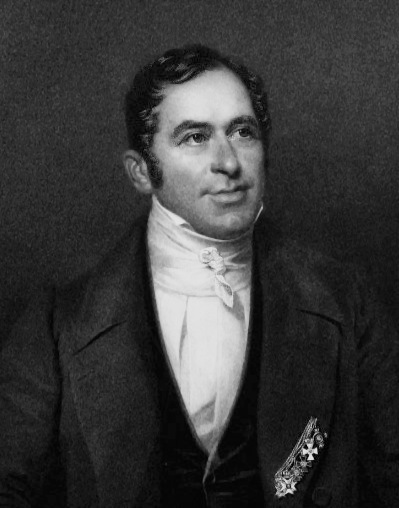
- Johann Lukas Schönlein
- Born: 30 November 1793; Bamberg, Holy Roman Empire
- Died: 23 January 1864 (aged 70); Bamberg, German Confederation
- Known for: Education of medicine Henoch-Schönlein purpura Trichophyton schoenleinii
- Scientific career
- Fields: Medicine
- Doctoral advisor: Ignaz Döllinger
- Other academic advisors: Friedrich Tiedemann
- Doctoral students: Rudolph Wagner
- Author abbrev. (botany): Schönl.

Johann Lukas Schönlein (30 November 1793 – 23 January 1864) was a German naturalist, and professor of medicine, born in Bamberg. He studied medicine at Landshut, Jena, Göttingen, and Würzburg. After teaching at Würzburg and Zurich, he was called to Berlin in 1839, where he taught therapeutics and pathology. He served as physician to Frederick William IV.

== Work ==
He was one of the first German medical professors to lecture in the vernacular tongue instead of Latin. Schönlein described purpura rheumatica (Schönlein's disease) an allergic non-thrombopenic purpura rash that became known as Henoch–Schönlein purpura, though now known as IgA vasculitis. He also discovered the parasitic cause of ringworm or favus (Trichophyton schoenleinii).

J. L. Schönlein first published the name "tuberculosis" (German: Tuberkulose) in 1832. Prior to Schönlein's designation, tuberculosis had been called "consumption".

== Taxon named in his honor ==
- The blackspot tuskfish (Choerodon schoenleinii) is a wrasse native to the Indian Ocean and the western Pacific Ocean from Mauritius to Indonesia and Australia north to the Ryukyus.

== See also ==
- German inventors and discoverers

== Sources ==
- Nogaller, A M (2005). "Iogan Sheinlein (1793–1864)--outstanding physician, clinician and pathologist, teacher and philosopher". Terapevticheskiĭ Arkhiv. 77 (7): 93–5. ISSN 0040-3660. PMID 16116921.
- Matteson, E L (Aug 2000). "Notes on the history of eponymic idiopathic vasculitis: the diseases of Henoch and Schönlein, Wegener, Churg and Strauss, Horton, Takayasu, Behçet, and Kawasaki". Arthritis Care & Research. 13 (4): 237–45. doi:10.1002/1529-0131(200008)13:4<237::aid-anr8>3.0.co;2-j. ISSN 0893-7524. PMID 14635278.
- Hierholzer, J; Hierholzer C; Hierholzer K (1994). "Johann Lukas Schönlein and his contribution to nephrology and medicine". Am. J. Nephrol. 14 (4–6): 467–72. doi:10.1159/000168767. ISSN 0250-8095. PMID 7847488.
- Losse, H (Aug 1990). "[Typhoid fever]". Schweiz. Rundsch. Med. Prax. 79 (34): 976–82. ISSN 1013-2058. PMID 2204983.
- Koelbing, H M (Mar 1990). "[Johann Lucas Schönlein (1793–1864), a researcher and clinician]". Der Hautarzt; Zeitschrift für Dermatologie, Venerologie, und verwandte Gebiete. 41 (3): 174–7. ISSN 0017-8470. PMID 2188938.
- Ziegler-Böhme, H; Gemeinhardt H (1990). "[150 years medical mycology since Johann Lucas Schönlein]". Dermatologische Monatsschrift. 176 (10): 623–31. ISSN 0011-9083. PMID 2079125.
- Wagner, D (1989). "Not Available". NTM. 26 (2): 67–71. ISSN 0036-6978. PMID 11634437.
- Bleker, J (1989). "[Johann Lukas Schönlein, the natural history school and the method of clinical medicine. On the 125th anniversary of his death]". Zeitschrift für ärztliche Fortbildung. 83 (2): 102–6. ISSN 0044-2178. PMID 2655300.
- Berndt, H (1985). "[Johann Lucas Schönlein and the beginnings of the Berlin clinical school]". Zeitschrift für ärztliche Fortbildung. 79 (20): 861–2. ISSN 0044-2178. PMID 3909662.
- Bleker, J (1982). "[A heretofore unnoticed declaration by Schönlein]". Sudhoffs Archiv. 66 (2): 186–7. ISSN 0039-4564. PMID 6214055.
- Jones, J V (Dec 1973). "Letter: Schönlein versus Henoch". Br Med J. 4 (5893): 677–8. doi:10.1136/bmj.4.5893.677-e. ISSN 0007-1447. PMC 1587638. PMID 4586067.
