= Deutsches Ärzteblatt =

- Categories: Medicine
- Frequency: Weekly
- Circulation: 370,000 (2013)
- Publisher: Deutscher Ärzte-Verlag
- Founded: 1872
- Country: Germany
- Based in: Cologne
- Language: German and English
- Website: Magazine homepage
- ISSN: 0012-1207
- OCLC: 1777947

The Deutsches Ärzteblatt is a weekly German-language medical magazine published in Germany.

== Profile ==
Deutsches Ärzteblatt is published by the Deutscher Ärzte Verlag, which is co-owned by the German Medical Association (Bundesärztekammer) and the National Association of Statutory Health Insurance Physicians (Kassenärztliche Bundesvereinigung). It is the official journal of these two bodies, distributed to all physicians in Germany. It is published in three editions - Medical Practice Edition, Clinical Edition, and Other. The magazine is based in Cologne.

Deutsches Ärzteblatt International, launched in 2008, is published weekly in German and English, and is a peer-reviewed open access medical journal indexed in MEDLINE, PubMed and other citation indices.

In 2013, Deutsches Ärzteblatt had a circulation of 370,000 copies.

== See also ==
- List of magazines in Germany

== Books ==
- (J F Volrad Deneke and Richard E Sperber, eds) Einhundert Jahre Deutsches Ärzteblatt--Ärztliche Mitteilungen, 1872-1972, Cologne: Deutscher Ärzte-Verlag, 1972
