= ACE STAR Model of Knowledge Transformation =

Coordinates: 29.506°N 98.576°W

The ACE STAR Model of Knowledge Transformation © is a framework for the systematic integration of evidence into practice. The STAR Model is composed of five major stages: knowledge discovery, evidence summary, translation into practice recommendations, integration into practice, and evaluation. The model is one of the most commonly used frameworks that have shaped evidence-based nursing.

The model was developed by Dr. Kathleen Stevens at the Academic Center for Evidence-Based Practice located at the University of Texas Health Science Center at San Antonio. The model has been represented in many nursing textbooks, used as part of an intervention to increase EBP competencies, and as a framework for instruments measuring EBP readiness.
