= Lex Maria =

Mandatory reporting requirement in Sweden

Lex Maria is the colloquial name for the mandatory reporting in Chapter 3 Paragraph 5 of the Swedish Patient Safety Law (Patientsäkerhetslagen). The law requires that a care taker report to the Health and Social Care Inspectorate events that could have caused or have caused serious injury to the patient. The name originates from an incident in 1936 when four patients at Maria hospital in Stockholm died after being injected with disinfectant (mercury oxycyanide) instead of anesthetic.
