= Association of the Scientific Medical Societies in Germany =

German medical society umbrella organization

Association of the Scientific Medical Societies in Germany (AWMF)
- Arbeitsgemeinschaft der Wissenschaftlichen Medizinischen Fachgesellschaften e.V.
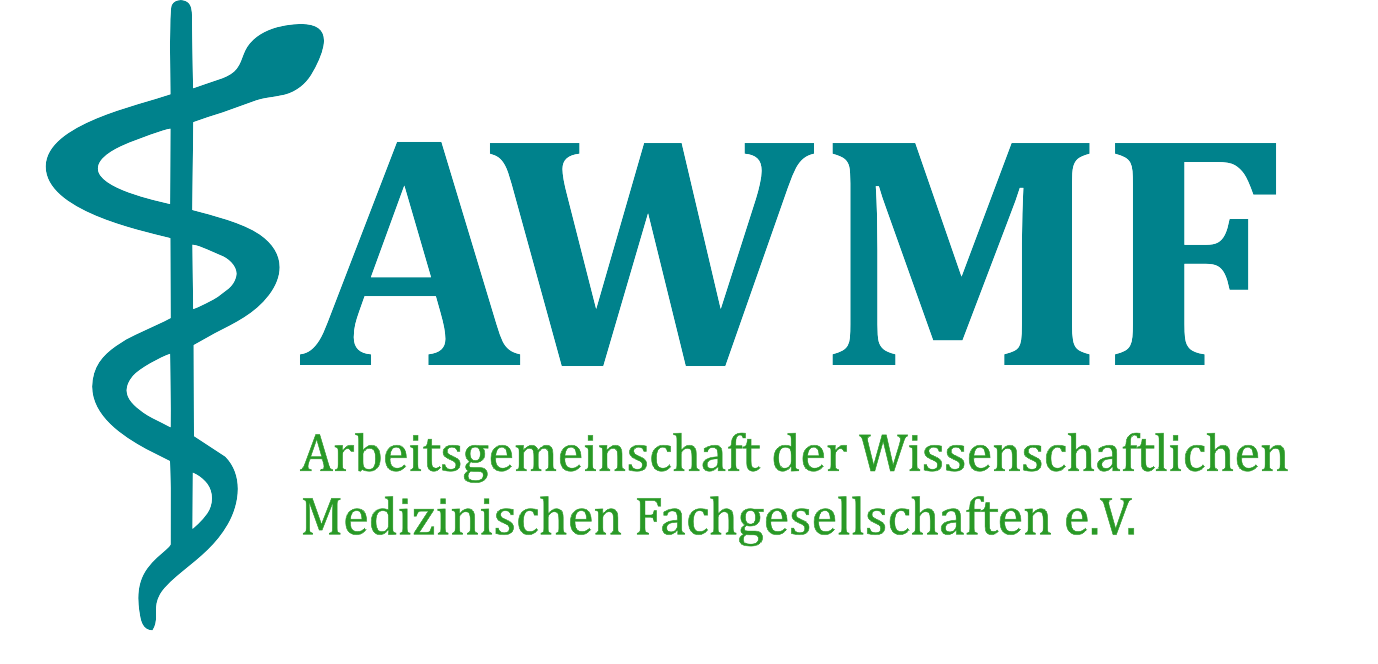
- Formation: 1962
- Type: Medical association, Nonprofit
- Purpose: Coordination and publication of medical guidelines, Representation of the interests of medical associations
- Headquarters: Frankfurt, Germany
- Members: 185 medical societies (2025)
- President: Rolf-Detlef Treede
- Website: awmf.org

The Association of the Scientific Medical Societies in Germany (AWMF; Arbeitsgemeinschaft der Wissenschaftlichen Medizinischen Fachgesellschaften), established in 1962 and located in Frankfurt am Main, is the umbrella organisation of more than 185 German medical societies.

It coordinates and publishes medical guidelines, promotes scientific exchange and represents the interests of medical associations to the public.

It is the German representative in the "Council for International Organizations of Medical Sciences CIOMS" at WHO.

== Guidelines ==
The AWMF applies four levels of classification to medical guidelines: S3, S2e, S2k and S1.

S3	Evidence and consensus-based	The highest level, for guidelines based on both a systematic analysis of the evidence and a structured consensus among a representative committee
S2e	Evidence-based	Guidelines based on a systematic analysis of the evidence
S2k	Consensus-based	Guidelines based on a structured consensus among a representative committee
S1	Expert recommendations	The lowest level, for expert recommendations that have not been developed systematically
