= SBAR =

Structured method of communication

SBAR is an acronym for Situation, Background, Assessment, Recommendation; a technique that can be used to facilitate prompt and appropriate communication. This communication model has gained popularity in healthcare settings, especially amongst professions such as physicians and nurses. It is a way for health care professionals to communicate effectively with one another, and also allows for important information to be transferred accurately. The format of SBAR allows for short, organized and predictable flow of information between professionals.

== History ==
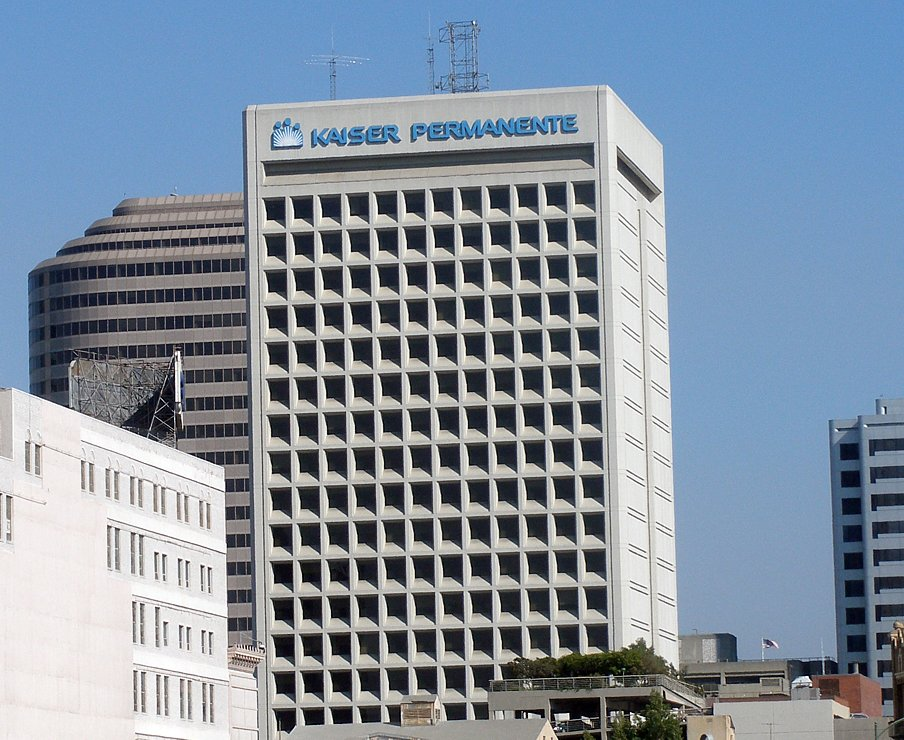
Kaiser Permanente Building

SBAR was first developed by the military, specifically for nuclear submarines. It was then used in the aviation industry, which adopted a similar model before it was put into use in health care. It was introduced to rapid response teams (RRT) at Kaiser Permanente in Colorado in 2002, to investigate patient safety. The main purpose was to alleviate communication problems traced from the differences in communication styles between healthcare professionals. SBAR was later adopted by many other health care organizations. It is among the most popular handover mnemonic systems in use.

It is now widely recommended in healthcare communication. For instance, the Royal College of Physicians of London, United Kingdom, recommends the use of SBAR during the handover of care between medical teams when treating patients who are seriously ill or at risk of deteriorating. SBAR is an included tool in the Interventions to Reduce Acute Care Transfers (INTERACT II) project, a US measure to reduce rehospitalization among residents of long-term care (LTC) facilities.

== Elements ==
=== Pre-SBAR ===
A few things are necessary for a health care professional to know before beginning an SBAR conversation. A thorough assessment of the patient should be done. The patient’s chart should be on hand with a list of current medications, allergies, IV fluids, and labs. Vital signs should be completed before making the call, and the patient's code status should be known and reported.

=== Situation ===
This part of SBAR determines what is going on and why health care professionals are needed. Health care professionals become familiar with the environment and the patient. Identify the problem and concern and provide a brief description of it. Be able to describe what is going on with the patient and why they are experiencing what is going on. During this stage of the communication the main goal is to communicate what is happening. It is recommended that this element be brief and last no more than 10 seconds.

It is recommended that health care professionals identify the person with whom they are speaking, to introduce oneself (including title or role) and where one is calling from. Providing information about the patient such as name, age, sex, and reason for admission is also important. Lastly, the health care professional is to communicate the patient's status (such as chest pain or nausea).

=== Background ===
The goal of background is to be able to identify and provide the diagnosis or reason for the patient’s admission, their medical status, and history. The background is also the place to determine the reason or context of the patient's visit. During this stage the patient's chart is ready and as much important medical-based information is provided to set up the assessment of data. Examples of medical-based information include date and reason for admission, most recent vital signs and vital signs outside of normal parameters, current medications, allergies, and labs, code status, and other clinically important information.

=== Assessment ===
At this stage, the situation is surveyed to determine the most appropriate course of action. Here the medical professional states what they believe the problem is based on current assessments and medical findings. The assessment should include a focused assessment of problem areas, all lines coming in and out of the patient's body, input and output, bowel and bladder, nutrition, and pain status. Any impertinent information is avoided unless asked for.

=== Recommendation ===
Health care professionals give very precise and descriptive explanations on exactly what they need during that time frame. Possible solutions that could correct the situation at hand are discussed between health care professionals. Notably, suggesting ideas to physicians can be a weak point of nurses. Therefore, an explicit statement of what is required, how urgent, and what action needs to be taken is paramount.

Preparation is an integral part of SBAR and health care professionals are suggested to prepare to be able to answer any question the physician may ask. Discussion with another colleague may help. It is highly recommended that information about medical records, medication, administration records, and patient flow sheet be studied before contacting a physician.

== Example of use in clinical setting ==
This is a direct example that shows how SBAR communication is used in a hospital setting involving communication between two nurses to effectively assess and diagnose the patient and correct the problem. This example is between an preoperative nurse to operating room nurse.

Situation: "Mary, I'm going to be sending Mr. Porter over to you in a few minutes for repair of his fractured ankle. I want you to know what's going on with him. I'm concerned about his emotional status. I've also alerted Dr Anesthesiologist and Dr Surgeon about my concern, but they have agreed to go ahead with the surgery because he needs this procedure to salvage his foot."

Background: "He was in an auto accident last Friday, and his wife was killed. His children are all at the funeral home making arrangements for her burial. He's made some comments about not wanting to live. His vital signs are stable; the foot is cool and slightly mottled. We've just given him some Versed."

Assessment: "I think his emotional status is such that this will be a very difficult period of time for him, especially during induction and awakening from anesthesia."

Recommendation: "I suggest that you meet him as soon as possible and stay with him during induction and emergence from anesthesia."

== Effects of use ==
In a 2013 review of studies addressing communication errors during handover, the greatest problem reported was the omission of detailed patient information. SBAR has been suggested as a means to overcome this problem by applying a system and structure to the presentation of information.

Using the SBAR communication model provides for more effective and enhanced family and patient outcomes on pediatric units. Using SBAR when producing bedside reports increases patient and family satisfaction and also increases their level of comfort when dealing with outlying situations. SBAR also allows nurses to be more effective when giving reports outside of the patients room. SBAR is a model used in communication that standardizes information to be given and lessons on communication variability, making report concise, objective and relevant.

Another benefit of using SBAR is that it allows patients to have the time to ask any questions that they might have, and allows patients to gain exact knowledge of information related to their plan of care. SBAR allows patients to be fully aware of whom their nurse is on every shift and this adds to the patients sense of comfort knowing that there will always be someone around looking after them during shift change.

SBAR use has not only improved the relationship between the doctors and the nurses but has also had a dramatic increase of overall health of patients. This led to a decrease in hospitalizations and deaths which efficiently improved communication between the nurse and doctor, which also led to a reduction of unexpected deaths. The problem between the communication between nurses and doctors is that the levels of teamwork and interaction are different therefore causing ineffective communication.

SBAR has been used in quality improvement projects that have looked at ways of avoiding hospitalizations.

== Limitations ==
SBAR communication encounters difficulties in certain situations which are:

- If the recipient is unfamiliar with the concept of SBAR.
- SBAR is a difficult concept to learn and practice and as such requires thorough education about the subject matter complete with necessary follow-up. A supportive environment, role-playing, and a skills assessment may help with the process.
- Further emphasis must also be given on recommendation since it has been seen that the R in SBAR has been the weak point of nurses. Giving advice to physicians on what to do is found to be intimidating for some nurses.
- A disadvantage to using the SBAR communication model within bedside reporting can be the issue of having to wake up patients and families when the practice of bedside charting occurs. Health care professionals and units must find an alternative way to deal with the patients and their families decisions if they choose not to be awakened and involved in bedside charting.
- Another disadvantage to using SBAR when bedside charting is the issue of disclosing sensitive topics or new information that has not been shared with the patient or family before or after the bedside charting takes place. An alternative to this can be for nurses to makes plans to share new or sensitive information before or after bedside report.
- Using SBAR communication when bedside charting causes a disadvantage for itself through the sharing of confidential information with the patient where it could be overheard by other patients. The effective communication that SBAR promotes leaves room for confidential information to be disclosed when nurses and doctors have discussions with patients causing patients and their families having negative opinion about participating in bedside charting, ultimately interfering with the use of the SBAR communication model.
