= Patient safety =

Prevention, reduction, reporting, and analysis of medical error

Patient safety is a specialized field focused on the improvement healthcare quality through the systematic prevention, reduction, reporting, and analysis of medical errors and preventable harm that can lead to negative patient outcomes. Although healthcare risks have long existed, patient safety gained formal recognition in the 1990s following reports of rates of medical error-related injuries in many countries. The urgency of the issue was underscored when the World Health Organization (WHO) identified that 1 in 10 patients globally experience harm due to healthcare errors, declaring patient safety an "endemic concern" in modern medicine.

Robust healthcare management systems assist in implementing patient safety strategies, ensuring that safety protocols are integrated into clinical operations to reduce medical errors.

Today, patient safety is a distinct healthcare discipline, supported by a developing scientific framework. It draws on a transdisciplinary body of theoretical and empirical research, with emerging technologies, such as mobile health applications, playing an important role in its advancement.

== Prevalence of adverse events ==
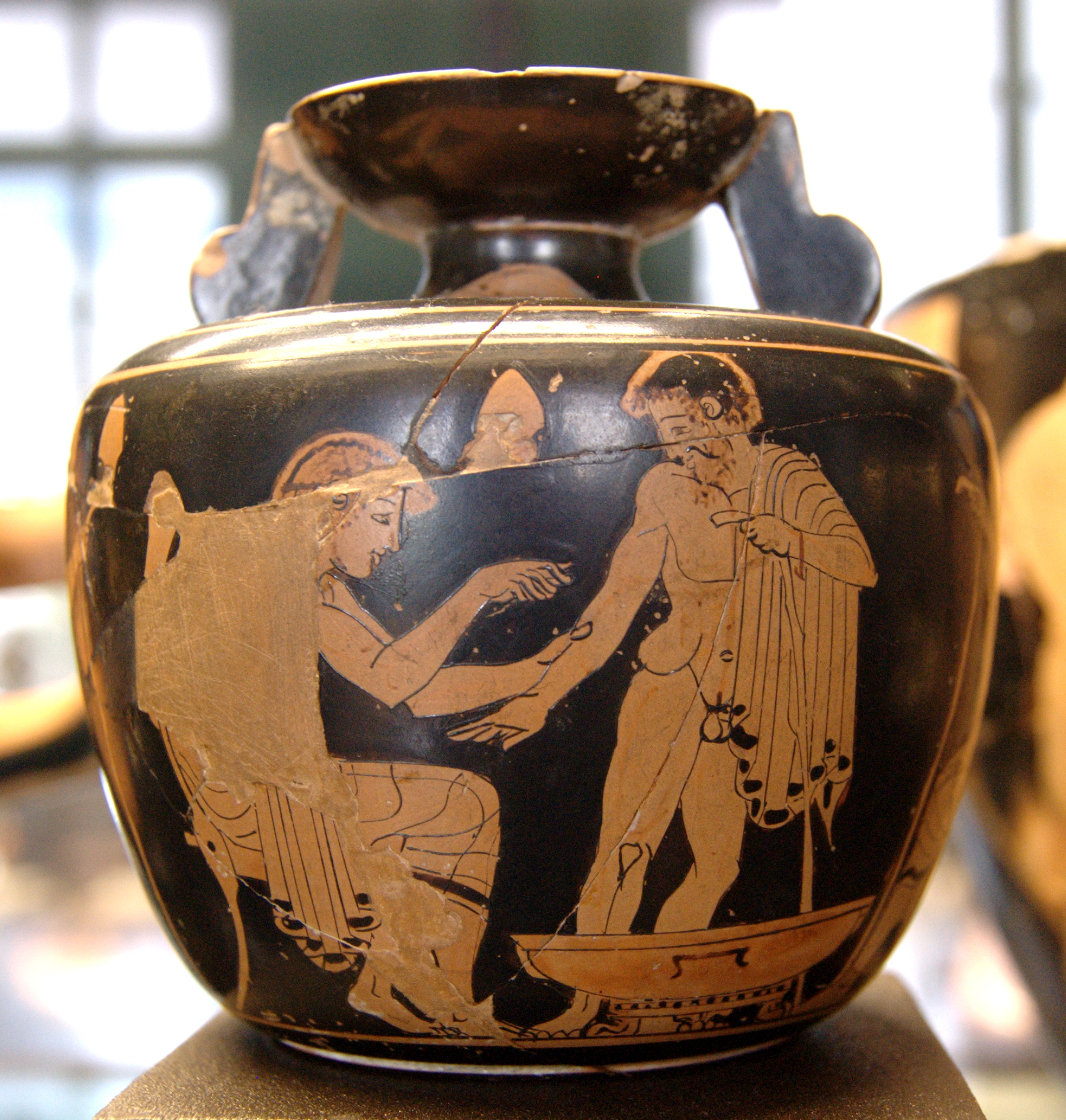
Greek physician treating a patient, c. 480–470 BC (Louvre Museum, Paris, France)

Millennia ago, Hippocrates recognized the potential for injuries that arise from the actions of healers who had no intent to cuse said harm. Greek healers in the 4th century BC drafted the Hippocratic Oath, pledging to "prescribe regimens for the good of my patients according to my ability and my judgment and never do harm to anyone." Since then, the directive primum non nocere ("first, do no harm") has become a tenet for contemporary medicine. However, despite an increasing emphasis on the scientific basis of medical practice in Europe and the United States in the late 19th century, data on adverse outcomes were not widely available. The various studies commissioned collected mostly anecdotal events.

In April 1982, the ABC television program 20/20 entitled The Deep Sleep was released Showing accounts of anesthetic accidents, the producers stated that, every year, 6,000 Americans die or experience brain damage related to medical mistakes. In 1983, the British Royal Society of Medicine and the Harvard Medical School jointly sponsored a symposium on anesthesia deaths and injuries, resulting in an agreement to share statistics and conduct studies. Attention was brought to medical errors in 1999 when the Institute of Medicine reported that about 98,000 deaths occur in the United States every year due to medical errors made in hospitals.

By 1984, the American Society of Anesthesiologists (ASA) had established the Anesthesia Patient Safety Foundation (APSF). The APSF marked the first use of the term "patient safety" in the name of a professional reviewing organization. Although anesthesiologists comprise only about 5% of physicians in the United States, anesthesiology became the leading medical specialty addressing issues of patient safety.

=== To Err is Human ===

In the United States, the full extent of medical errors were not avaliable in the 1990s, when several reports brought attention to it. In 1999, the Institute of Medicine (IOM) of the National Academy of Sciences released a report, To Err Is Human: Building a Safer Health System.

The IOM called for a broad national initiative focused on creating a Center for Patient Safety, expanding the reporting of adverse events, implementing safety programs within healthcare organizations, and increasing involvement from regulators, healthcare purchasers, and professional societies. Stattistics reported that from 44,000 to 98,000 preventable deaths annually due to medical errors in hospitals, with 7,000 preventable deaths related to medication errors alone. Within 2 weeks of the report's release, Congress began hearings, and President Clinton ordered a government-wide study of the feasibility of implementing the report's recommendations. Initial criticisms of the methodology in the IOM estimates focused on the statistical methods of amplifying low numbers of incidents in the pilot studies to the general population.

A bibliometric analysis in 2020 revealed a steady growth of publications in this area. In 2016, Michael Daniels and Martin A. Makary published a piece in The British Medical Journal that claimed medical error was the third leading cause of death in America at nearly half a million deaths per year. This number has since been debunked, citing flawed and improper methodology in the paper. More recent analysis using data from the 2016 Global Burden of Diseases, Injuries, and Risk Factors (GBD) study obtained an estimate of 123,603 deaths in the United States from 1990 to 2016 due to adverse effects of medical treatment (AEMT), with the mortality rate decreasing over time despite an overall increase in the number of deaths.

The experience has been similar in other countries.

- In 1992, an Australian study revealed 18,000 annual deaths from medical errors. Professor Bill Runciman, one of the study's authors and president of the Australian Patient Safety Foundation since its inception in 1989, reported himself a victim of a medical dosing error.
- In June 2000, the Department of Health Expert Group estimated that over 850,000 incidents harm National Health Service hospital patients in the United Kingdom each year. On average, forty incidents a year contribute to patient deaths in each NHS institution.
- In 2004, the Canadian Adverse Events Study found that adverse events occurred in more than 7% of hospital admissions and estimated that 9,000 to 24,000 Canadians die annually after an avoidable medical error.

These and other reports from New Zealand, Denmark and developing countries have led the World Health Organization to estimate that one in ten persons receiving health care will suffer preventable harm.

== Psychological safety ==
Psychological safety aims to provide an environment where patients and medical professionals share concerns and mistakes. This assists increased reporting, as well as the sharing of new ideas and honest feedback. A wider variety of information is thus shared throughout the organization, allowing for creativity, innovation, and learning. Psychological safety is believed to lead to better outcomes by providing basis for more informed decisions.

Psychological safety has been found to play an important role in both patient safety culture and in enabling quality improvement in the health care setting.

== Communication ==
Communication involves distributing relevant information across operational sites to ensure alignment. It also reduces administrative burden by using model-driven instructions, freeing up operational staff and easing procedural demands. This enables consistent execution with minimal but essential feedback, ensuring processes remain both efficient and controlled.

=== Effective and ineffective communication ===
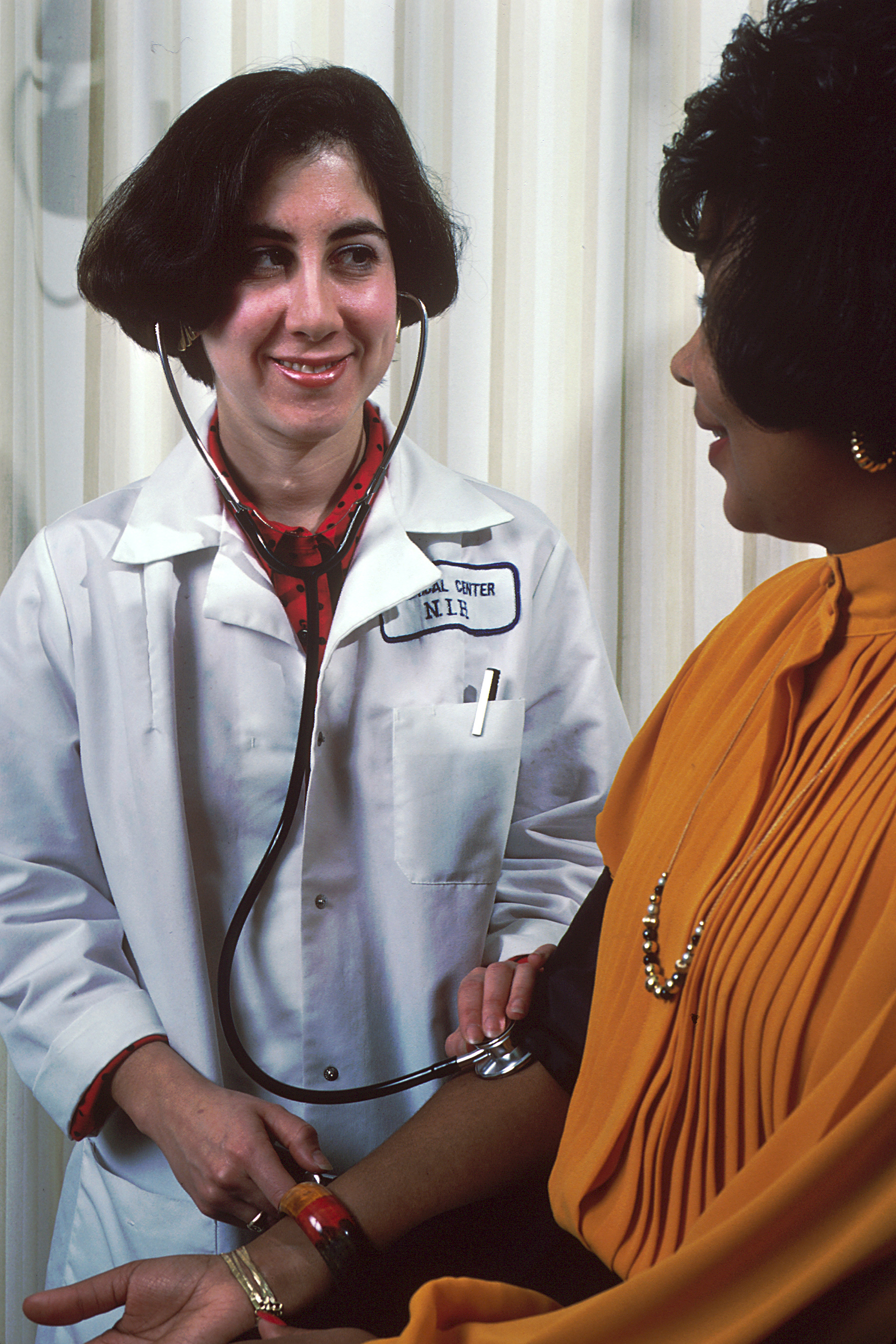
Nurse and patient non-verbal communication

The use of effective communication among patients and healthcare professionals is associated with a patient's health outcome. However, scientific patient safety research by Annegret Hannawa et al. has shown that ineffective communication can lead to patient harm. Communication regarding patient safety can be classified into two categories: the prevention of adverse events and the response to adverse events. Effective communication may help to prevent adverse events, whereas ineffective communication may contribute to their occurrence. If ineffective communication contributes to an adverse event, improved communication skills may be applied in response to achieve optimal outcomes for the patient's safety. There are different modes in which healthcare professionals can work to optimize the safety of patients which include both verbal and nonverbal communication, as well as the effective use of communication technologies.

Methods of effective verbal and nonverbal communication include treating patients with respect and showing empathy, clearly communicating with patients in a way that best fits their needs, practicing active listening skills, demonstrating cultural sensitivity and awareness, and respecting the privacy and confidentiality rights of the patient. To use appropriate communication technology, healthcare professionals must choose which channel of communication is best suited to benefit the patient. Some channels are more likely to result in communication errors than others, such as communicating through telephone or email (missing nonverbal messages which are an important element of understanding the situation). It is also the responsibility of the provider to know the advantages and limitations of using electronic health records, as they do not convey all the information necessary to understand patient needs. If a health care professional is not practicing these skills, they are not being an effective communicator which may affect patient outcomes.

The goal of a healthcare professional is to aid a patient in achieving their optimal health outcome, which entails that the patient's safety is not at risk. The practice of effective communication plays a crucial role in promoting and protecting patient safety.

=== Teamwork and communication ===
During complex situations, health professionals must communicate clearly and effectively. There are several techniques, tools, and used to improve communication. Any team should have a clear purpose, and each member should be aware of their role and be involved accordingly. To increase the quality of communication between people involved, regular feedback should be provided. Strategies such as briefings allow the team to be set on their purpose and ensure that members not only share the goal but also the process they will follow to achieve it. Briefings reduce interruptions, prevent delays, and build stronger relationships, resulting in a strong patient safety environment.

Debriefing is another useful strategy. Healthcare providers meet to discuss a situation, record what they learned, and discuss how it might be better handled. Closed loop communication is another important technique used to ensure that the message that was sent is received and interpreted by the receiver. SBAR is a structured system designed to help team members communicate about the patient in the most convenient form possible. Communication between healthcare professionals not only helps achieve the best results for the patient but also prevents any unseen incidents.

=== Safety culture ===
As is the case in other industries, when a mistake or error is made, people look for someone to blame. This tendency creates a blame culture where who is more important than why or how. A just culture, also sometimes known as no blame or no fault, seeks to understand the root causes of an incident rather than just who was involved.

In health care, there is a move towards a patient safety culture. This applies the lessons learned from other industries, such as aviation, marine, and industrial, to a health care setting.

When assessing and analyzing an incident, individuals involved are much more likely to be forthcoming with their own mistakes if they know that their job is not at risk. This allows a much more complete and clearer picture to be formed of the facts of an event. From there, root cause analysis can occur. There are often multiple causative factors involved in an adverse or near-miss event. It is only after all contributing factors have been identified that effective changes can be made that will prevent a similar incident from occurring.

=== Disclosure of an incident ===
After an adverse event occurs, each country has its own way of dealing with the incident. In Canada, a quality improvement review is primarily used. A quality improvement review is an evaluation that is completed after an adverse event occurs with the intention to both fix the problem as well as prevent it from happening again. The individual provinces and territories have laws on whether it is required to disclose the quality improvement review to the patient. Healthcare providers have an obligation to disclose any adverse event to their patients because of ethical and professional guidelines. If more providers participate in the quality improvement review, it can increase interdisciplinary collaboration and can sustain relationships between departments and staff. In the US, clinical peer review is used: uninvolved medical staff review the event and work toward preventing further incidents.

The disclosure of adverse events is important in maintaining trust in the relationship between healthcare provider and patient. It is also important to learn how to avoid these mistakes in the future by conducting quality improvement reviews or clinical peer reviews. If the provider accurately handles the event and discloses it to the patient and their family, he/she can avoid getting punished, which includes lawsuits, fines, and suspension.

== Causes of healthcare error ==
The simplest definition of a healthcare error is a preventable adverse effect of care, whether or not it is evident or harmful to the patient. Errors have been, in part, and/or attributed to:

=== Human factors ===
- Variations in healthcare provider training and experience, fatigue, depression and burnout.
- Diverse patients, unfamiliar settings, and time pressures.
- Failure to acknowledge the prevalence and seriousness of medical errors.
- Increasing working hours of healthcare personnel.
- Mislabeling specimen or forgetting to label specimen.
- States of anxiety and stress put on the healthcare provider.

=== Medical complexity ===
- Complicated technologies, powerful drugs.
- Intensive care, prolonged hospital stays.

=== System failures ===
- Unsafe communication.
- Unclear lines of authority or guidelines for physicians, nurses, and other care providers.
- Complication increasing when the patient to nurse staffing ratio increases to a point where the patient rate is higher than the rate of staff.
- Disconnected reporting systems within a hospital: fragmented systems in which numerous hand-offs of patients result in errors in examples such as coordination or other general reports due to even minor errors.
- Drug names that look alike or sound alike.
- The impression that action is being taken by other groups within the institution.
- Reliance on automated systems to prevent error.
- Inadequate systems to share information about errors hamper analysis of contributory causes and improvement strategies.
- Cost-cutting measures by hospitals in response to reimbursement cutbacks.
- Environment and design factors. In emergencies, patient care may be rendered in areas poorly suited for safe monitoring. The American Institute of Architects has identified concerns for the safe design and construction of healthcare facilities.
- Infrastructure failure. According to the WHO, around 50% of medical equipment in developing countries is only partly usable due to a lack of skilled operators or parts. As a result, diagnostic procedures or treatments cannot be performed, leading to substandard treatment.

The Joint Commission's Annual Report on Quality and Safety 2007 found that inadequate communication between healthcare providers, between providers and the patient, and between providers and the patient's family members, was the root cause of over half the serious severe adverse events in accredited hospitals. Other leading causes included inadequate assessment of the patient's condition, poor leadership, and/or training.

Common misconceptions about adverse events are:

- " 'Bad apples', or incompetent health care providers are a common cause for patient harm". Many of the errors are normal human slips or lapses, and not the result of poor judgment or recklessness.
- "High-risk procedures or medical specialties are responsible for most avoidable adverse events". Although some mistakes, such as those in surgery, are easier to notice, errors occur at all levels of care. Even though complex procedures entail more risk, adverse outcomes are not usually due to error, but to the severity of the condition being treated. However, USP has reported that medication errors during the course of a surgical procedure are three times more likely to cause harm to a patient than those occurring in other types of hospital care.
- "If a patient experiences an adverse event during the process of care, an error has occurred". Most medical care entails some level of risk, and there can be complications or side effects, even unforeseen ones, from the underlying condition or from the treatment itself.

=== Nursing burnout and patient safety ===
On average in the medical field, one out of 20 prescriptions filled contains an error. There is a $3.5 billion price tag that goes with it, covering the amount that people pay each year for litigation costs and extra days that patients need to stay in hospital beds because of mistakes from the hospital.

Burnout occurs in nurses and other physicians, affecting nearly half of healthcare workers.

== Safety programs in industry ==
=== Aviation safety ===
In the United States, two organizations contribute to one of the world's lowest aviation accident rates. Mandatory accident investigation is carried out by the National Transportation Safety Board, while the Aviation Safety Reporting System receives voluntary reports to identify deficiencies and provide data for planning improvements. The latter system is confidential and provides reports back to stakeholders without regulatory action. Similarities and contrasts have been noted between the "cultures of safety" in medicine and aviation. Pilots and medical personnel operate in complex environments, interact with technology, and are subject to fatigue, stress, danger, and loss of life and prestige as a consequence of error. Given the enviable record of aviation in accident prevention, a similar medical adverse event system would include both mandatory (for severe incidents) and voluntary non-punitive reporting, teamwork training, feedback on performance and an institutional commitment to data collection and analysis. The Patient Safety Reporting System (PSRS) is a program modeled upon the Aviation Safety Reporting System and developed by the Department of Veterans Affairs (VA) and the National Aeronautics and Space Administration (NASA) to monitor patient safety through voluntary, confidential reports. Required training in crew resource management (CRM), which focused on team dynamics both inside the cockpit and outside was introduced in the early 1980s after the tragic mishap of United Airlines 173. CRM is considered an effective means of improving safety in aviation and is utilized by the DoD, NASA, and almost all commercial airlines. Many of the tenets of this training have been incorporated into medicine under the guise of Team Stepps, which was introduced by the Agency for Healthcare Research and Quality (AHRQ). The AHRQ calls this program "an evidence-based teamwork system to improve communication and teamwork skills among health care professionals."

=== Near-miss reporting ===
A near miss is an unplanned event that did not result in injury, illness, or damage - but had the potential to do so. Reporting of near misses by observers is an established error reduction technique in aviation, and has been extended to private industry, traffic safety, and fire-rescue services with reductions in accidents and injury. AORN, a US-based professional organization of perioperative registered nurses, has put in effect a voluntary near-miss reporting system (SafetyNet), covering medication or transfusion reactions, communication or consent issues, wrong patient or procedures, communication breakdown or technology malfunctions. An analysis of incidents allows safety alerts to be issued to AORN members. AlmostME is another commercially offered solution for near miss reporting in healthcare.

=== Limits of the Industrial Safety Model ===
Unintended consequences may occur as improvements in safety are undertaken. It may not be possible to attain maximum safety goals in healthcare without adversely affecting patient care in other ways. An example is blood transfusion; in recent years, to reduce the risk of transmissible infection in the blood supply, donors with only a small probability of infection have been excluded. The result has been a critical shortage of blood for other lifesaving purposes, with a broad impact on patient care. Application of high-reliability theory and normal accident theory can help predict the organizational consequences of implementing safety measures.

== Technology in healthcare ==
=== Overview ===
According to a study by RAND Health, the U.S. healthcare system could save more than $81 billion annually, reduce adverse healthcare events, and improve the quality of care if health information technology (HIT) is widely adopted. The most immediate barrier to widespread adoption of technology is cost despite the patient benefit from better health, and payer benefit from lower costs. However, hospitals pay both higher costs for implementation and potentially lower revenues (depending on reimbursement scheme) due to reduced patient length of stay. The benefits provided by technological innovations also give rise to serious issues with the introduction of new and previously unseen error types.

=== Types of healthcare technology ===
Handwritten reports or notes, manual order entry, non-standard abbreviations, and poor legibility lead to substantial errors and injuries, according to the IOM (2000) report. The follow-up IOM report, Crossing the Quality Chasm: A New Health System for the 21st Century, advised rapid adoption of electronic patient records, and electronic medication ordering, with computer- and internet-based information systems to support clinical decisions. This section contains only the patient safety related aspects of HIT.

=== Electronic health record (EHR) ===
The electronic health record (EHR), previously known as the electronic medical record (EMR), reduces several types of errors, including those related to prescription drugs, emergency and preventive care, and to tests and procedures. Important features of modern EHR include automated drug-drug/drug-food interaction checks and allergy checks, standard drug dosages and patient education information. Drug Information at the point-of-care and drug dispensing points helps in reducing errors. Example: India, MedCLIK. Also, these systems provide recurring alerts to remind clinicians of intervals for preventive care and to track referrals and test results. Clinical guidelines for disease management have a demonstrated benefit when accessible within the electronic record during the process of treating the patient. Advances in health informatics and widespread adoption of interoperable electronic health records promise access to a patient's records at any health care site. Still, there may be a weak link because of physicians' deficiencies in understanding the patient safety features of e.g. government-approved software. Errors associated with patient misidentification may be exacerbated by EHR use, but inclusion of a prominently displayed patient photograph in the EHR can reduce errors and near misses.

Portable offline emergency medical record devices have been developed to provide access to health records during widespread or extended infrastructure failure, such as in natural disasters or regional conflicts.

=== Active RFID platform ===
These systems' basic security measures are based on sound identifying electronic tags to ensure that the patient details provided in different situations are always reliable. These systems offer three differently qualified options:

- Identification upon request of health care personnel, using scanners (similar to readers for passive RFID tags or scanners for barcode labels) to identify patients semi-automatically upon presentation of the patient with a tag to staff
- Automatic identification upon entry of patient. An automatic identification check is carried out on each person with tags (primarily patients) entering the area to determine the presented patient in contrast to other patient earlier entered into reach of the used reader.
- Automatic identification and range estimation upon approach to the most proximate patient, excluding reads from more distant tags of other patients in the same area

Any of these options may be applied whenever and wherever patient details are required in electronic form Such identifying is essential when the information concerned is critical. There are increasing numbers of hospitals that have an RFID system to identify patients, for instance: Hospital La Fe in Valencia, Spain; Wayne Memorial Hospital (US); Royal Alexandria Hospital (UK).

=== Computerized provider order entry (CPOE) ===
Prescribing errors are the largest identified source of preventable errors in hospitals (IOM, 2000; 2007). The IOM (2006) estimates that each hospitalized patient, on average, is exposed to one medication error each day. Computerized provider order entry (CPOE), formerly called computerized physician order entry, can reduce medication errors by 80% overall but more importantly decrease harm to patients by 55%. A Leapfrog (2004) survey found that 16% of US clinics, hospitals, and medical practices are expected to utilize CPOE within 2 years.

Complete safety medication system

A standardized bar code system for dispensing drugs might prevent 25% of drug errors. Despite ample evidence to reduce medication errors, complete medication delivery systems (barcoding and Electronic prescribing) have slow adoption by doctors and hospitals in the United States, due to concerns with interoperability and compliance with future national standards. Such concerns are not inconsequential; standards for electronic prescribing for Medicare Part D conflict with regulations in many US states.

==== Specific patient safety software ====
A standardized, modular technology system that allows a hospital, clinic, or health system to record their Incidents, including falls, medication errors, pressure ulcers, near misses, etc. These systems can be configured to specific workflows, and the analytics behind them will allow for reporting and dashboards to help learn from things that have gone wrong (and right). Some vendors include Datix, RL Solutions, Verge, Midas, and Quantros.

=== Technological Iatrogenesis ===
Technology-induced errors are significant and increasingly more evident in care delivery systems. This idiosyncratic and potentially serious problem associated with HIT implementation has recently become a tangible concern for healthcare and information technology professionals. As such, the term technological iatrogenesis describes this new category of adverse events that are an emergent property resulting from technological innovation creating system and microsystem disturbances. Healthcare systems are complex and adaptive, meaning there are many networks and connections working simultaneously to produce certain outcomes. When these systems are under the increased stresses caused by the diffusion of new technology, unfamiliar and new process errors often result. If not recognized, over time these new errors can collectively lead to catastrophic system failures. The term "e-iatrogenesis" can be used to describe the local error manifestation. The sources for these errors include:

- Prescriber and staff inexperience may lead to a false sense of security; that when technology suggests a course of action, errors are avoided.
- Shortcut or default selections can override non-standard medication regimens for elderly or underweight patients, resulting in toxic doses.
- CPOE and automated drug dispensing were identified as a cause of error by 84% of over 500 healthcare facilities participating in a surveillance system by the United States Pharmacopoeia.
- Irrelevant or frequent warnings can interrupt workflow.

Solutions include ongoing changes in design to cope with unique medical settings, supervising overrides from automatic systems, and training (and re-training) all users.

=== Evidence-based medicine ===
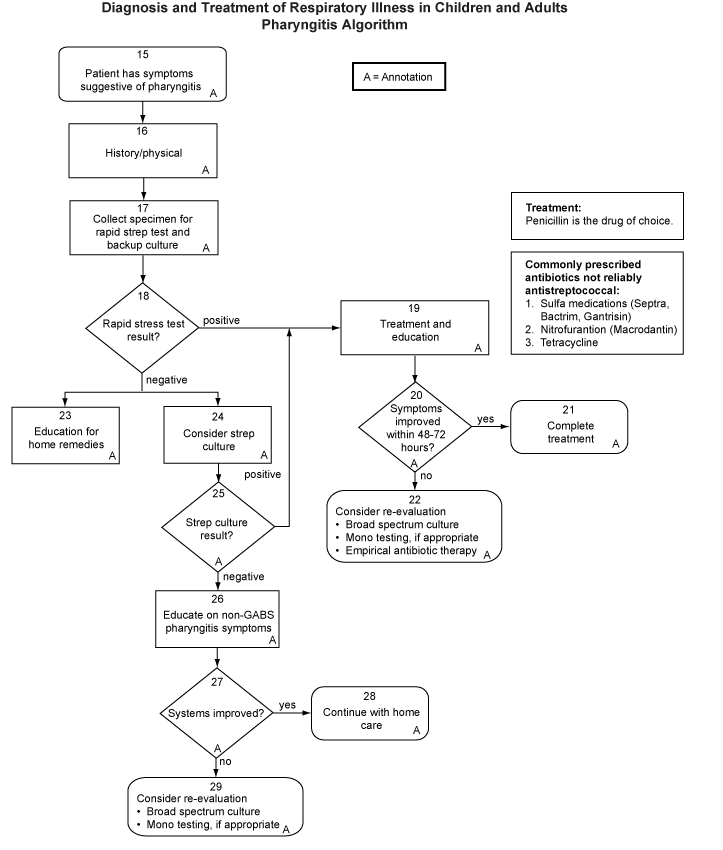
National Guideline Clearinghouse

Evidence-based medicine integrates an individual doctor's exam and diagnostic skills for a specific patient, with the best available evidence from medical research. The doctor's expertise includes both diagnostic skills and consideration of individual patients' rights and preferences in making decisions about his or her care. The clinician uses pertinent clinical research on the accuracy of diagnostic tests and the efficacy and safety of therapy, rehabilitation, and prevention to develop an individual plan of care. The development of evidence-based recommendations for specific medical conditions, termed clinical practice guidelines or "best practices", has accelerated in the past few years. In the United States, over 1,700 guidelines (see example image, right) have been developed as a resource for physicians to apply to specific patient presentations. The National Institute for Health and Clinical Excellence (NICE) in the United Kingdom provides detailed "clinical guidance" for both health care professionals and the public about specific medical conditions. National Guideline Agencies from all continents collaborate in the Guidelines International Network, which entertains the largest guideline library worldwide. The International Standard ISO 15189:2007 for Accreditation of Medical Laboratory requires laboratories to continuously monitor and improve the quality of their facilities.

Advantages:

1. Evidence-based medicine may reduce adverse events, especially those involving incorrect diagnosis, outdated or risky tests or procedures, or medication overuse.
2. Clinical guidelines provide a common framework for improving communication among clinicians, patients and non-medical purchasers of health care.
3. Errors related to changing shifts or multiple specialists are reduced by a consistent plan of care.
4. Information on the clinical effectiveness of treatments and services can help providers, consumers and purchasers of health care make better use of limited resources.
5. As medical advances become available, doctors and nurses can keep up with new tests and treatments as guidelines are improved.

Drawbacks:

1. Managed care plans may attempt to limit "unnecessary" services to cut the costs of health care, despite evidence that guidelines are not designed for general screening, but rather as decision-making tools when an individual practitioner evaluates a specific patient.
2. The medical literature is evolving and often controversial; the development of guidelines requires consensus.
3. Implementing guidelines and educating the entire health care team within a facility costs time and resources (which may be recovered by future efficiency and error reduction).
4. Clinicians may resist evidence-based medicine as a threat to traditional relationships between patients, doctors, and other health professionals since any participant can influence decisions.
5. Failing to follow guidelines might increase the risk of liability or disciplinary action by regulators.

== Quality and Safety Initiatives in Community Pharmacy practice ==
Community pharmacy practice is making important advances in the quality and safety movement, despite the limited number of federal and state regulations that exist and in the absence of national accreditation organizations such as the Joint Commission - a driving force for performance improvement in health care systems. Community pharmacies are using automated drug dispensing devices (robots), computerized drug utilization review tools, and, most recently, the ability to receive electronic prescriptions from prescribers to decrease the risk of error and increase the likelihood of delivering high-quality care.

Quality Assurance (QA) in community practice is a relatively new concept. As of 2006, only 16 states have some form of legislation that regulates QA in community pharmacy practice. While most state QA legislation focuses on error reduction, North Carolina has recently approved legislation that requires the pharmacy QA program to include error reduction strategies and assessments of the quality of their pharmaceutical care outcomes and pharmacy services.

New technologies facilitate the traceability tools of patients and medications. This is particularly relevant for drugs that are considered high-risk and costly.

== Quality improvement and safety initiatives in pediatrics ==
Quality improvement and patient safety is a major concern in the pediatric world of health care. This next section will focus on quality improvement and patient safety initiatives in inpatient settings.

Over the last several years, pediatric groups have partnered to improve general understanding, reporting, process improvement methodologies, and quality of pediatric inpatient care. These collaborations have created a robust program of projects, bench-marking efforts, and research. Much of the research and focus on adverse events has been on medication errors–the most frequently reported adverse event for both adult and pediatric patients. It is also of interest to note that medication errors are also the most preventable type of harm that can occur within the pediatric population. It has been reported that when pediatric medication errors occur, these patients have a higher rate of death associated with the error than adult patients. A more recent review of potential pediatric safety issues conducted by Miller, Elixhauser, and Zhan found that hospitalized children who experienced a patient safety incident, compared with those who did not, had

1. Length of stay 2 to 6 times longer
2. Hospital mortality 2 to 18 times greater
3. Hospital charges 2 to 20 times higher

In order to reduce these errors, the attention to safety needs to concentrate on designing safe systems and processes. Slonim and Pollack point out that safety is critical to reducing medical errors and adverse events. These problems can range from diagnostic and treatment errors to hospital-acquired infections, procedural complications, and failure to prevent problems such as pressure ulcers. In addition to addressing quality and safety issues found in adult patients there are a few characteristics that are unique to the pediatric population:

- Development: As children mature both cognitively and physically, their needs as consumers of health care goods and services change. Therefore, planning a unified approach to pediatric safety and quality is affected by the fluid nature of childhood development.
- Dependency: Hospitalized children, especially those who are very young and/or nonverbal, are dependent on caregivers, parents, or other surrogates to convey key information associated with patient encounters. Even when children can accurately express their needs, they are unlikely to receive the same acknowledgment accorded to adult patients. In addition, because children are dependent on their caregivers, their care must be approved by parents or surrogates during all encounters.
- Different epidemiology: Most hospitalized children require acute episodic care, not care for chronic conditions as with many adult patients. Planning safety and quality initiatives within a framework of "wellness, interrupted by acute conditions or exacerbations" presents distinct challenges and requires a new way of thinking.
- Demographics: Children are more likely than other groups to live in poverty and experience racial and ethnic disparities in health care. Children are more dependent on public insurance, such as the State Children's Health Insurance Program (SCHIP) and Medicaid.

One of the main challenges faced by pediatric safety and quality efforts is that most of the work on patient safety to date has focused on adult patients. In addition, there is no standard nomenclature for pediatric patient safety that is widely used. However, a standard framework for classifying pediatric adverse events that offers flexibility has been introduced. Standardization provides consistency between interdisciplinary teams and can facilitate multi-site studies. If these large-scale studies are conducted, the findings could generate large-scale intervention studies conducted with a faster life cycle.

=== Leaders in pediatric safety and quality ===
The Agency for Healthcare Research and Quality (AHRQ) is the Federal authority for patient safety and quality of care and has been a leader in pediatric quality and safety. AHRQ has developed Pediatric Quality Indicators (PedQIs) with the goal to highlight areas of quality concern and to target areas for further analysis. Eighteen pediatric quality indicators are included in the AHRQ quality measure modules; based on expert input, risk adjustment, and other considerations. Thirteen inpatient indicators are recommended for use at the hospital level, and five are designated area indicators. Inpatient indicators are treatments or conditions with the greatest potential of an adverse event for hospitalized children.

Pediatric quality & provider-level indicators	Area-Level indicators
Accidental puncture or laceration	Asthma admission rate
Decubitus ulcer	Diabetes short-term complication rate
Foreign body left during procedure	Gastroenteritis admission rate
Iatrogenic pneumothorax in neonates at risk	Perforated appendix admission rate
Iatrogenic pneumothorax in nonneonates	Urinary tract admission rate
Pediatric heart surgery mortality	
Pediatric heart surgery volume	
Postoperative hemorrhage or hematoma	
Postoperative respiratory failure	
Postoperative sepsis	
Postoperative wound dehiscence	
Selected infections due to medical care	

Possible additions to the dataset will address the patient's condition on admission and increase the understanding of how laboratory and pharmacy utilization impact patient outcomes. The goal of AHRQ is to refine the area-level indicators to improve outcomes for children receiving outpatient care and reduce the incidence of hospitalization for those defined conditions.

=== Collaborations for pediatric safety and quality ===
Numerous groups are engaged in improving pediatric care, quality, and safety. Each of these groups has a unique mission and membership. The following table details these groups' missions and websites.

Organization	Mission	Web Site
The National Association of Children's Hospitals & Related Institutions	Clinical care, research, training, and advocacy	www.childrenshospitals.net
Child Health Corporation of America	Business strategies, safety & quality	www.chca.com
National Initiative for Children's Healthcare Quality	Education and research	www.nichq.org
Neonatal Intensive Care/Quality & Vermont Oxford Network	Quality improvement, safety & cost effectiveness for newborns & families	www.nicq.org
Children's Oncology Group	Cures for childhood cancers, family support	www.childrensoncologygroup.org
Initiative for Pediatric Palliative Care	Education, research & quality improvement	www.ippcweb.org
End-of-Life Nursing Education Consortium	End-of-life education & support	www.aacn.nche.edu/elnec

=== Nurse staffing and pediatric outcomes ===
While the number of nurses providing patient care is recognized as an inadequate measure of nursing care quality, there is hard evidence that nurse staffing is directly related to patient outcomes. Studies by Aiken and Needleman have demonstrated that patient death, nosocomial infections, cardiac arrest, and pressure ulcers are linked to inadequate nurse-to-patient ratios. The presence or absence of registered nurses (RNs) impacts the outcome for pediatric patients requiring pain management and/or peripheral administration of intravenous fluids and/or medications. These two indicators of pediatric nursing care quality are sensitive measures of nursing care. Professional nurses play a key role in successful pain management, especially among pediatric patients unable to verbally describe pain. Astute assessment skills are required to intervene successfully and relieve discomfort.33 Maintenance of a patient's intravenous access is a clear nursing responsibility. Pediatric patients are at increased risk for intravenous infiltration and for significant complications of infiltration, should it occur.

The characteristics of effective indicators of pediatric nursing care quality include the following:

- Scalable: The indicators are applicable to pediatric patients across a broad range of units and hospitals, in both intensive care and general care settings.
- Feasible: Data collection does not pose undue burden on staff of participating units as the data is available from existing sources, such as the medical record or a quality improvement database and can be collected in real time.
- Valid and reliable: Indicator measurement within and across participating sites is accurate and consistent over time.

=== Conclusions ===
Pediatric care is complex due to developmental and dependency issues associated with children. How these factors impact the specific processes of care is an area of science in which little is known. Throughout health care, providing safe and high-quality patient care continues to provide significant challenges. Efforts to improve the safety and quality of care are resource-intensive and take continued commitment not only by those who deliver care but also by agencies and foundations that fund this work.

== Working hours of nurses and patient safety ==
A recent increase in work hours and overtime shifts of nurses has been used to compensate for the decrease in a number of registered nurses (RNs). Logbooks completed by nearly 400 RNs have revealed that about "40 percent of the 5,317 work shifts they logged exceeded twelve hours." Errors by hospital staff nurses are more likely when work shifts extend beyond 12 hours, or they work over 40 hours in one week. Studies have shown that overtime shifts have harmful effects on the quality of care provided to patients, but some researchers "who evaluated the safety of 12-hour shifts did not find increases in medication errors." The errors which these researchers found were "lapses of attention to detail, errors of omission, compromised problem solving, reduced motivation" due to fatigue as well as "errors in grammatical reasoning and chart reviewing." Overworked nurses are a serious safety concern for their patients' well-being. Working back-to-back shifts, or night shifts, is a common cause of fatigue in hospital staff nurses. "Less sleep, or fatigue, may lead to increased likelihood of making an error, or even the decreased likelihood of catching someone else's error." Limiting working hours and shift rotations could "reduce the adverse effects of fatigue" and increase the quality of patient care.

== Health literacy ==
Health literacy is a common and serious safety concern. A study of 2,600 patients at two hospitals determined that between 26% and 60% of patients could not understand medication directions, a standard informed consent, or basic health care materials. This mismatch between a clinician's level of communication and a patient's ability to understand can lead to medication errors and adverse outcomes.

The Institute of Medicine (2004) report found low health literacy levels negatively affect healthcare outcomes. In particular, these patients have a higher risk of hospitalization and longer hospital stays, are less likely to comply with treatment, are more likely to make errors with medication, and are more ill when they seek medical care.

== Pay for performance (P4P) ==
Pay for performance systems can improve patient safety by linking providers' compensation to measures of work quality or process goals. As of 2005, 75 percent of all U.S. companies connected at least part of an employee's pay to measures of performance, and in healthcare, over 100 private and federal pilot programs were underway. Methods of healthcare payment current at that time may actually have rewarded less-safe care, since some insurance companies will not pay for new practices to reduce errors, while physicians and hospitals can bill for additional services that are needed when patients are injured by mistakes. However, early studies showed little gain in quality for the money spent, as well as evidence suggesting unintended consequences, like the avoidance of high-risk patients, when payment was linked to outcome improvements. The 2006 Institute of Medicine report Preventing Medication Errors recommended "incentives...so that profitability of hospitals, clinics, pharmacies, insurance companies, and manufacturers (are) aligned with patient safety goals...(to) strengthen the business case for quality and safety."

There is widespread international interest in health care pay-for-performance programs in a range of countries, including Australia, Canada, Germany, the Netherlands, New Zealand, the United Kingdom, and the United States.

=== United Kingdom ===
In the United Kingdom, the National Health Service (NHS) began an ambitious pay-for-performance initiative in 2004, known as the Quality and Outcomes Framework (QOF). General practitioners agreed to increases in existing income according to performance with respect to 146 quality indicators covering clinical care for 10 chronic diseases, organization of care, and patient experience. Unlike proposed quality incentive programs in the United States, funding for primary care was increased by 20% over previous levels. This allowed practices to invest in extra staff and technology; 90% of general practitioners use the NHS Electronic Prescription Service, and up to 50% use electronic health records for the majority of clinical care. Early analysis showed that substantially increasing physicians' pay based on their success in meeting quality performance measures is successful. The 8,000 family practitioners included in the study earned an average of $40,000 more by collecting nearly 97% of the points available.

A component of this program, known as exception reporting, allows physicians to use criteria to exclude individual patients from the quality calculations that determine physician reimbursement. There was initial concern that exception reporting would allow inappropriate exclusion of patients in whom targets were missed ("gaming"). However, a 2008 study has shown little evidence of widespread gaming.

=== United States ===
In the United States, Medicare has various pay-for-performance ("P4P") initiatives in offices, clinics, and hospitals, seeking to improve quality and avoid unnecessary healthcare costs. The Centers for Medicare and Medicaid Services (CMS) has several demonstration projects underway offering compensation for improvements:

- Payments for better care coordination between home, hospital, and offices for patients with chronic illnesses. In April 2005, CMS launched its first value-based purchasing pilot or "demonstration" project- the three-year Medicare Physician Group Practice (PGP) Demonstration. The project involves ten large, multi-specialty physician practices caring for more than 200,000 Medicare fee-for-service beneficiaries. Participating practices will phase in quality standards for preventive care and the management of common chronic illnesses such as diabetes. Practices meeting these standards will be eligible for rewards from savings due to resulting improvements in patient management. The First Evaluation Report to Congress in 2006 showed that the model rewarded high quality, efficient provision of health care, but the lack of up-front payment for the investment in new systems of case management "have made for an uncertain future with respect for any payments under the demonstration."
- A set of 10 hospital quality measures which, if reported to CMS, will increase the payments that hospitals receive for each discharge. By the third year of the demonstration, those hospitals that do not meet a threshold on quality will be subject to reductions in payment. Preliminary data from the second year of the study indicates that pay for performance was associated with a roughly 2.5% to 4.0% improvement in compliance with quality measures, compared with the control hospitals. Dr. Arnold Epstein of the Harvard School of Public Health commented in an accompanying editorial that pay-for-performance "is fundamentally a social experiment likely to have only modest incremental value." Unintended consequences of some publicly reported hospital quality measures have adversely affected patient care. The requirement to give the first antibiotic dose in the emergency department within 4 hours, if the patient has pneumonia, has caused an increase in pneumonia misdiagnosis.
- Rewards to physicians for improving health outcomes by the use of health information technology in the care of chronically ill Medicare patients.
- Disincentives: The Tax Relief & Health Care Act of 2006 required the HHS Inspector General to study ways that Medicare payments to hospitals could be recouped for "never events", as defined by the National Quality Forum, including hospital infections. In August 2007, CMS announced that it will stop payments to hospitals for several negative consequences of care that result in injury, illness or death. This rule, effective October 2008, would reduce hospital payments for eight serious types of preventable incidents: objects left in a patient during surgery, blood transfusion reaction, air embolism, falls, mediastinitis, urinary tract infections from catheters, pressure ulcer, and sepsis from catheters. Reporting of "never events" and creation of performance benchmarks for hospitals are also mandated. Other private health payers are considering similar actions; in 2005, HealthPartners, a Minnesota health insurer, chose not to cover 27 types of "never events". The Leapfrog Group has announced that they will work with hospitals, health plans, and consumer groups to advocate reducing payment for "never events", and will recognize hospitals that agree to certain steps when a serious avoidable adverse event occurs in the facility, including notifying the patient and patient safety organizations, and waiving costs. Physician groups involved in the management of complications, such as the Infectious Diseases Society of America, have voiced objections to these proposals, observing that "some patients develop infections despite the application of all evidence-based practices known to avoid infection", and that a punitive response may discourage further study and slow the dramatic improvements that have already been made.

=== Complex illness ===
Pay-for-performance programs often target patients with serious and complex illnesses; such patients commonly interact with multiple healthcare providers and facilities. However, pilot programs now underway focus on simple indicators such as improvement in lab values or use of emergency services, avoiding areas of complexity such as multiple complications or several treating specialists. A 2007 study analyzing Medicare beneficiaries' healthcare visits showed that a median of two primary care physicians and five specialists provide care for a single patient. The authors doubt that pay-for-performance systems can accurately attribute responsibility for the outcome of care for such patients. The American College of Physicians Ethics has stated concerns about using a limited set of clinical practice parameters to assess quality, "especially if payment for good performance is grafted onto the current payment system, which does not reward robust comprehensive care...The elderly patient with multiple chronic conditions is especially vulnerable to this unwanted effect of powerful incentives." Present pay-for-performance systems measure good performance based on specified clinical measurements, such as glycohemoglobin for diabetic patients. Healthcare providers who are monitored by such limited criteria have a powerful incentive to deselect (dismiss or refuse to accept) patients whose outcome measures fall below the quality standard and therefore worsen the provider's assessment. Patients with low health literacy, inadequate financial resources to afford expensive medications or treatments, and ethnic groups traditionally subject to healthcare inequities may also be deselected by providers seeking improved performance measures.

== Public reporting ==
=== Mandatory reporting ===
==== Denmark ====
The Danish Act on Patient Safety passed Parliament in June 2003. On January 1, 2004, Denmark became the first country to introduce nationwide mandatory reporting. The Act obligates front line personnel to report adverse events to a national reporting system. Hospital owners are obligated to act on the reports and the National Board of Health is obligated to communicate the learning nationally. The reporting system is intended purely for learning and front line personnel cannot experience sanctions for reporting. This is stated in Section 6 of the Danish Act on Patient Safety (as of January 1, 2007: Section 201 of the Danish Health Act): "A front line person who reports an adverse event cannot as a result of that report be subjected to investigation or disciplinary action from the employer, the Board of Health or the Court of Justice." The reporting system and the Danish Patient Safety Database are described in further detail in a National Board of Health publication.

==== United Kingdom ====
The National Patient Safety Agency encourages voluntary reporting of health care errors but has several specific instances, known as "Confidential Enquiries", for which investigation is routinely initiated: maternal or infant deaths, childhood deaths to age 16, deaths in persons with mental illness, and perioperative and unexpected medical deaths. Medical records and questionnaires are requested from the involved clinician, and participation has been high, since individual details are confidential.

==== United States ====
The 1999 Institute of Medicine (IOM) report recommended "a nationwide mandatory reporting system ... that provides for ... collection of standardized information by state governments about adverse events that result in death or serious harm." Professional organizations, such as the Anesthesia Patient Safety Foundation, responded negatively: "Mandatory reporting systems, in general, create incentives for individuals and institutions to play a numbers game. If such reporting becomes linked to punitive action or inappropriate public disclosure, there is a high risk of driving reporting "underground", and of reinforcing the cultures of silence and blame that many believe are at the heart of the problems of medical error..."

Although 23 states established mandatory reporting systems for serious patient injuries or death by 2005, the national database envisioned in the IOM report was delayed by the controversy over mandatory versus voluntary reporting. Finally in 2005, the US Congress passed the long-debated Patient Safety and Quality Improvement Act, establishing a federal reporting database. Hospitals reports of serious patient harm are voluntary, collected by patient safety organizations under contract to analyze errors and recommend improvements. The federal government serves to coordinate data collection and maintain the national database. Reports remain confidential and cannot be used in liability cases. Consumer groups have objected to the lack of transparency, claiming it denies the public information on the safety of specific hospitals.

==== Sweden ====
According to the Patient Safety Law (Patientsäkerhetslagen) healthcare providers must report incidents that resulted or could have resulted in serious medical damage to Health and Social Care Inspectorate (known as Lex Maria notification).

=== Individual patient disclosures ===
For a healthcare institution, disclosing an unanticipated event should be made as soon as possible. Some healthcare organizations may have a policy regarding the disclosure of unanticipated events. The amount of information presented to those affected is dependent on the family's readiness and the organization's culture. The employee disclosing the event to the family requires support from risk management, patient safety officers, and senior leadership. Disclosures are objectively documented in the medical record.

=== Voluntary disclosure ===
In public surveys, a significant majority of those surveyed believe that health care providers should be required to report all serious medical errors publicly. However, reviews of the medical literature show little effect of publicly reported performance data on patient safety or the quality of care. Public reporting on the quality of individual providers or hospitals does not seem to affect selection of hospitals and individual providers. Some studies have shown that reporting performance data stimulates quality improvement activity in hospitals. As of 2012, only one in seven errors or accidents are reported, showing that most errors that happen are not reported.

==== United States ====
===== Medical error =====
Ethical standards of the Joint Commission on Accreditation of Healthcare Organizations (JCAHO), the American Medical Association (AMA) Council on Ethical and Judicial Affairs, and the American College of Physicians Ethics Manual require disclosure of the most serious adverse events. However, many doctors and hospitals do not report errors under the current system because of concerns about malpractice lawsuits; this prevents collection of information needed to find and correct the conditions that lead to mistakes. As of 2008, 35 US states have statutes allowing doctors and health care providers to apologize and offer expressions of regret without their words being used against them in court, and 7 states have also passed laws mandating written disclosure of adverse events and bad outcomes to patients and families. In September 2005, US Senators Clinton and Obama introduced the National Medical Error Disclosure and Compensation (MEDiC) Bill, providing physicians protection from liability and a safe environment for disclosure, as part of a program to notify and compensate patients harmed by medical errors. It is now the policy of several academic medical centers, including Johns Hopkins, University of Illinois and Stanford, to promptly disclose medical errors, offering apologies and compensation. This national initiative, hoping to restore integrity to dealings with patients, make it easier to learn from mistakes, and avoid angry lawsuits, was modeled after a University of Michigan Hospital System program that has reduced the number of lawsuits against the hospital by 75% and has decreased the average litigation cost. The Veterans Health Administration requires the disclosure of all adverse events to patients, even those that are not obvious. However, as of 2008 these initiatives have only included hospitals that are self-insured and that employ their staffs, thus limiting the number of parties involved. Medical errors are the third leading cause of death in the US, after heart disease and cancer, according to research by Johns Hopkins University. Their study published in May 2016 concludes that more than 250,000 people die every year due to medical mix-ups. Other countries report similar results.

===== Performance =====
In April 2008, consumer, employer, and labor organizations announced an agreement with major physician organizations and health insurers on principles to measure and report doctors' performance on quality and cost.

==== United Kingdom ====
In the United Kingdom, whistleblowing is well recognized and is government-sanctioned, as a way to protect patients by encouraging employees to call attention to deficient services. Health authorities are encouraged to put local policies in place to protect whistleblowers.

== Studies of patient safety ==
Numerous organizations, government branches, and private companies conduct research studies to investigate the overall health of patient safety in America and across the globe. Despite the shocking and widely publicized statistics on preventable deaths due to medical errors in America's hospitals, the 2006 National Healthcare Quality Report assembled by the Agency for Healthcare Research and Quality (AHRQ) had the following sobering assessment:

- Most measures of quality are improving, but the pace of change remains modest.
- Quality improvement varies by setting and phase of care.
- The rate of improvement accelerated for some measures while a few continued to show deterioration.
- Variation in health care quality remains high.

A 2011 study of more than 1,000 patients with advanced colon cancer found that one in eight were treated with at least one drug regimen with specific recommendations against its use in the National Comprehensive Cancer Network guidelines. The study focused on three chemotherapy regimens that were not supported by evidence from prior clinical studies or clinical practice guidelines. One treatment was rated "insufficient data to support", one had been "shown to be ineffective", and one was supported by "no data, nor is there a compelling rationale." Many of the patients received multiple cycles of non-beneficial chemotherapy, and some received two or more unproven treatments. Potential side effects of the treatments included hypertension, heightened risk of bleeding and bowel perforation.

== Organizations advocating patient safety ==
Several authors of the 1999 Institute of Medicine report revisited the status of their recommendations and the state of patient safety, five years after "To Err is Human". Discovering that patient safety had become a frequent topic for journalists, health care experts, and the public, it was harder to see overall improvements on a national level. What was noteworthy was the impact on attitudes and organizations. Few healthcare professionals now doubt that preventable medical injuries are a serious problem. The central concept of the report—that bad systems and not bad people lead to most errors—became established in patients' safety efforts. A broad array of organizations now advances the cause of patient safety. For instance, in 2010 the principal European anaesthesiology organizations launched the Helsinki Declaration for Patient Safety in Anaesthesiology, which incorporates many of the principles described above.

== See also ==
- Adverse event – Any event, symptom, or disease occurring during a medical treatment
- Barcode technology in healthcare
- Blood transfusion – Intravenous transference of blood products
- Classification of Pharmaco-Therapeutic Referrals – Taxonomy of cases requiring referral
- Compliance (medicine) – Descriptor of patient compliance with medical advice
- EudraVigilance
- Evidence-based medicine – Illness diagnosis, treatment and prevention based on data collection and analysis
- High 5s Project – WHO patient safety collaboration
- Hospital accreditation – Assessment of healthcare institutions
- Iatrogenesis – Causation of harm by any medical activity
- Iatrogenic disorder – Causation of harm by any medical activity
- Improvement Science Research Network
- International healthcare accreditation – International healthcare accreditation organisation
- Inverse benefit law – Drug benefit-harm ratio falls with marketing
- Medical ethics – System of moral principles of the practice of medicine
- Medical error – Preventable adverse effect of medical care
- Medical identification tag – Bracelet or tag with medical information
- Nosocomial infection – Infection spread in hospitals or health care facilities
- Nursing – Health care profession
- Patient safety organization – Group that improves medical care by reducing medical errors
- Patient Safety and Quality Improvement Act – US law of 2005
- Patients' rights – Set of principles to protect the interest of those receiving medical care
- Palliative care – Area of healthcare that focuses on relieving and preventing suffering
- Peter Pronovost – American physician: Time 100 (2008) Most Influential People in the World; authored over 800 articles/chapters on patient safety; advisor to the World Health Organization's World Alliance for Patient Safety
- Pharmacovigilance – Study of pharmaceutical drug safety
- Pharmacy Automation - The Tablet Counter – Mechanical handling of medications
- Public health – Promoting health through informed choices
- Quaternary prevention
- Serious adverse event – Negative medical occurrence during a human drug trial
- Swiss cheese model – Model used in risk analysis of accident causation in human systems
- Structured Clinical Interview for DSM-IV – Psychiatric diagnostic interview protocol (SCID)
- Unlicensed assistive personnel – Paraprofessionals who assist with bedside care
