= German Coalition for Patient Safety =

German patient safety organisation

German Coalition for Patient Safety APS
- Formation: 2005
- Type: German NPO
- Purpose: Promoting Patient Safety
- Headquarters: Bonn, Germany
- Region served: Germany
- Chairman: Hedwig Francois-Kettner
- Website: http://www.german-coalition-for-patient-safety.org/

The German Coalition for Patient Safety (APS) – in German "Aktionsbündnis Patientensicherheit (APS)", was established in 2005 and located in Bonn is a German non-profit association of organisations and individuals interested and involved in promotion of patient safety.

== Activities ==
APS' multidisciplinary working groups develop recommendations for patient safety activities in in- and outpatient healthcare institutions. The recommendations are available as open-access documents and distributed in healthcare institutions for free.

APS collaborates with professional and consumer associations, with societies, insurance organizations, self-governmental bodies, and research institutions. The Federal Ministry of Health is one of the organization's sponsors. APS acting together with the German Agency for Quality in Medicine is a Lead Technical Agency of the international High 5 Project.

== Selected projects ==
Recommendation for preventing wrong site surgery Based on international protocols four actions to prevent wrong-site surgery were defined: (1) asking the patient about his identity and the planned intervention, (2) marking the operation site with an indelible pen, (3) ensuring that the right patient is brought to the operating room, and (4) a “team timeout” of the operating team immediately before the intervention.

Recommendation for establishing critical incident reporting systems (CIRS) in hospitals CIRS are voluntary reporting systems for hospital staff. Their purpose is to discover unsafe practices and to initiate safety measures before patients are harmed. APS published recommendations on how to establish CIRS in hospitals, and is partner of the German Hospital CIRS Network.

Checklist for medication safety in hospitals A checklist with a graduated scheme to measure medication safety was published as a tool for any hospital to review common activities and projects to improve medication safety.

Medication list for patients At the time of drug prescription doctors often do not have full information about all drugs taken by the patient. This provokes the incalculable risk of unwanted drug interactions and adverse events. APS therefore published a schedule for patients to list their medications.
