= Guidelines International Network =

Guidelines International Network (GIN)
- Formation: 2002
- Type: International NPO
- Purpose: To support improvement in the quality of healthcare
- Headquarters: Scotland
- Region served: Worldwide
- Chief Executive Officer: Elaine Harrow
- Staff: 5
- Volunteers: 12
- Website: www.g-i-n.net

The Guidelines International Network (GIN) is an international scientific association of organisations and individuals interested and involved in development and application of evidence-based guidelines and health care information. The network supports evidence-based health care and improved health outcomes by reducing inappropriate variation throughout the world.

== Membership and Organisation ==
The Network's membership consists of 115 organisations working in the field of medical guidelines and other types of healthcare guidance as well as of around 130 individual experts (March 2021). The members represent about 47 countries from all continents. The list of members is available on the GIN website Being constituted as a Scottish Guarantee Company under Company Number SC243691, the Network is recognised as a Scottish Charity under Scottish Charity Number SC034047.

== History ==
Based upon the work of the international AGREE Collaboration for the quality of clinical practice guidelines, an organised network for organisations and experts working in the field of evidence-based guidelines was proposed in early 2002 at the first international guideline conference in Berlin, Germany. Guideline experts called for international standardized guideline methods, and information exchange in this field. The proposal was endorsed by health care agencies from all parts of the world such as AHRQ (USA), CBO (NL) German Agency for Quality in Medicine, NICE (UK), SIGN (UK), and NZGG (NZ). Against this background the Guidelines International Network GIN was founded in November 2002 in Paris with Günter Ollenschläger as founding chairman.

== Mission and Aims ==
The goal of the network is to lead, strengthen and support collaboration and work within the guideline development, adaptation and implementation community. GIN's main aims are:

- Promoting best practice through the development of learning opportunities and capacity building, as well as the establishment of standards
- Improving the efficiency and effectiveness of evidence-based guideline development, adaptation, dissemination and implementation
- Building a Network and partnerships for guideline developing organisations, end users (such as health care providers, healthcare policy makers and consumers) and stakeholders.

== Activities ==
GIN has an International Guideline Library and registry, one of the world's largest guideline libraries, containing regularly updated guidelines and publications of the GIN membership, as well as other guideline developers. The registry is open for all guideline developers to register their guidelines. As of April 2021 around 3000 documents were available.

The network organises the annual GIN Conference around the globe: 2003 Edinburgh (UK), 2004 Wellington (NZ), 2005 Lyon (FR), 2007 Toronto (CA), 2008 Helsinki (FI), 2009 Lisbon (PT), 2010 Chicago (US), 2011 Seoul (KR), 2012 Berlin (DE), 2013 San Francisco (US), 2014 Melbourne (AU), 2015 Amsterdam (NL), 2016 Philadelphia (US), 2018 Manchester (UK) and 2019 Adelaide. In 2017, GIN was one of five organising partners of the first Global Evidence Summit.

GIN Projects are developed in several working groups focussing on the following topics, amongst many others:

- Guideline Adaptation
- Guideline Implementation
- GIN Tech
- Public and Patient involvement
