= Recanati (disambiguation) =

Recanati is an Italian town.

Recanati may also refer to:

== Locations ==
- Roman Catholic Diocese of Recanati, Roman Catholic diocese in Italy
- Porto Recanati, a port town in Marche, Italy that was created by its separation from Recanati

== People ==
- Bárbara Recanati (born 1986), Argentine musician
- François Recanati (born 1952), French philosopher and linguist
- Leon Recanati (born 1948), Israeli businessman and philanthropist
- Leon Yehuda Recanati (1890–1945), Greek-born Israeli businessman and philanthropist
- Menahem Recanati (1223–1290), Italian rabbi
- Michael Recanati (1957–2015), American businessman and philanthropist
- Raphael Recanati (1924–1999), Greek-born Israeli-American businessman, banker and philanthropist

Other

- Avraham Rakanti (1888–1980), Greek-Israeli politician, journalist, deputy mayor of Thessaloniki, and member of the first Knesset

== Other uses ==
- Recanati winery, Israeli winery
- Recanati Annunciation, painting
- Recanati Polyptych, painting
