= Michael Recanati =

American businessman and philanthropist (1957-2015)

- מיכאל רקנאטי
- Born: June 21, 1957
- Died: July 12, 2015 (aged 58)
- Occupations: Businessman, philanthropist
- Partner: Tom Schalk
- Children: 1
- Father: Raphael Recanati
- Relatives: Leon Yehuda Recanati (paternal grandfather); Leon Recanati (first cousin) Avraham Rakanti (Great uncle)

Michael Recanati (Hebrew: מיכאל רקנאטי; 1957–2015) was an American businessman and philanthropist.

== Early life ==
Michael Recanati was born in 1957. His father, Raphael Recanati was an Israeli-American businessman and philanthropist. Recanati was educated at Ramaz School in Manhattan, New York City.

== Career ==
Recanati started his career at his family business, the Overseas Shipholding Group, in 1978. He was forced to leave OSG in 1995 after a dispute about the company's investments in cruise ships.

Recanati founded Orama, a venture capital firm based in New York City and Tel Aviv, Israel, in 1999. It closed down in 2001. In 2008, Recanati founded Really Cool Foods, an organic food company. It closed down in 2011.

Recanati served as the chairman of 511 Equities.

== Philanthropy ==
Recanati endowed the Dina and Raphael Recanati Professorship in Immunology at the Harvard Medical School in honor of his parents in 1992. Dr Jerome Groopman is the current chair. He also endowed the Recanati Family Professor of Science and professor of Microbiology and Medicine at the Skirball Institute of Biomolecular Medicine at New York University

In 2002, Recanati and his partner Ira Statfeld made a $5 million donation to the then Hampton Day School, taking control of the board of trustees and changing the name of the school to the Morriss Center in honor of Statfeld's father, however the school merged with the Ross School in 2006. In 2007, it was reported that Recanati and his partner had donated $30 million to the Child Study Center at New York University to establish an Asperger's Institute.

== Personal life ==
Recanati and his partner Ira Statfeld had one son. They resided in Manhattan and East Hampton, New York.

His partner at time of death was Tom Schalk.
