= Leor Energy =

Gas company founded in Texas

- Industry: Petroleum industry
- Founded: 2003; 23 years ago
- Founder: Thomas Kaplan; Guma Aguiar
- Defunct: September 15, 2015; 10 years ago
- Headquarters: Houston, Texas
- Products: Petroleum; Natural gas Natural gas liquids

Leor Energy was a company engaged in hydrocarbon exploration, primarily in East Texas. It was based in Houston. It sold most of its assets to Encana (now Ovintiv) in November 2007 for $2.55 billion and, in September 2015, the company was acquired by Comancheria Energy Resources.

== History ==
Thomas Kaplan and Guma Aguiar founded Leor in 2003. Kaplan, Aguiar's uncle, took the role of Chairman. He was formerly the chairman of Apex Silver Mines.

While Aguiar did not have experience in the petroleum industry, he met with geologist John Amoruso and acquired 30,000 acres of leasehold interests in East Texas in 2003.

In July 2005, Leor and EnCana (now Ovintiv) entered into an agreement to explore and develop Leor's Amoruso Prospect in Robertson County, Texas whereby Encana acquired a 30% interest in the joint venture, increased to 50% in June 2006.

In November 2005, Leor closed a $30.0 million senior secured note financing from Amaranth Advisors. In January 2006, Leor closed a $45.0 million private placement of equity securities with Goldman Sachs.

In July 2006, Leor sold approximately 3,360 acres (14 km^{2}) net in its holdings in the Amoruso Prospect to EnCana (now Ovintiv), for $242.9 million. The transaction resulted in Leor and EnCana each having a 50% stake in the prospect. After the transaction Leor held a 23,725-acre (96 km^{2}) net position in the prospect.

In January 2007, Leor closed a $150.0 million private placement of equity securities with Merrill Lynch to fund additional drilling.

In April 2007, gross gas production from the Amoruso Field and the company's other properties in Robertson County, Texas, reached 200 million cubic feet (5.7 million cubic meters) per day.

In May 2007, Leor increased its footprint in the Deep Bossier by making an equity investment in Navasota Resources Ltd., LLP for over $100.0 million. Navasota held a two-thirds working interest in approximately 15,000 acres (61 km^{2}) gross of Deep Bossier land in Robertson County, Texas. Navasota's land is adjacent to Leor's Amoruso Prospect.

In November 2007, Leor sold its Deep Bossier natural gas and land interests (including its 50% stake in the Amoruso Field) to EnCana (now Ovintiv) for $2.55 billion. This was Leor's first exploration program in the Deep Bossier during which time, in 24 months, production from the Amoruso Field grew from zero to more than 240 million gross cubic feet per day.

Aguiar was recognized by Oil and Gas Investor magazine as its 2007 Executive of the Year.

In 2012, Aguilar disappeared at sea off the coast of Florida.

In September 2015, the company was acquired by Comancheria Energy Resources.
