= Hagar and the Angel =

Painting by Carel Fabritius

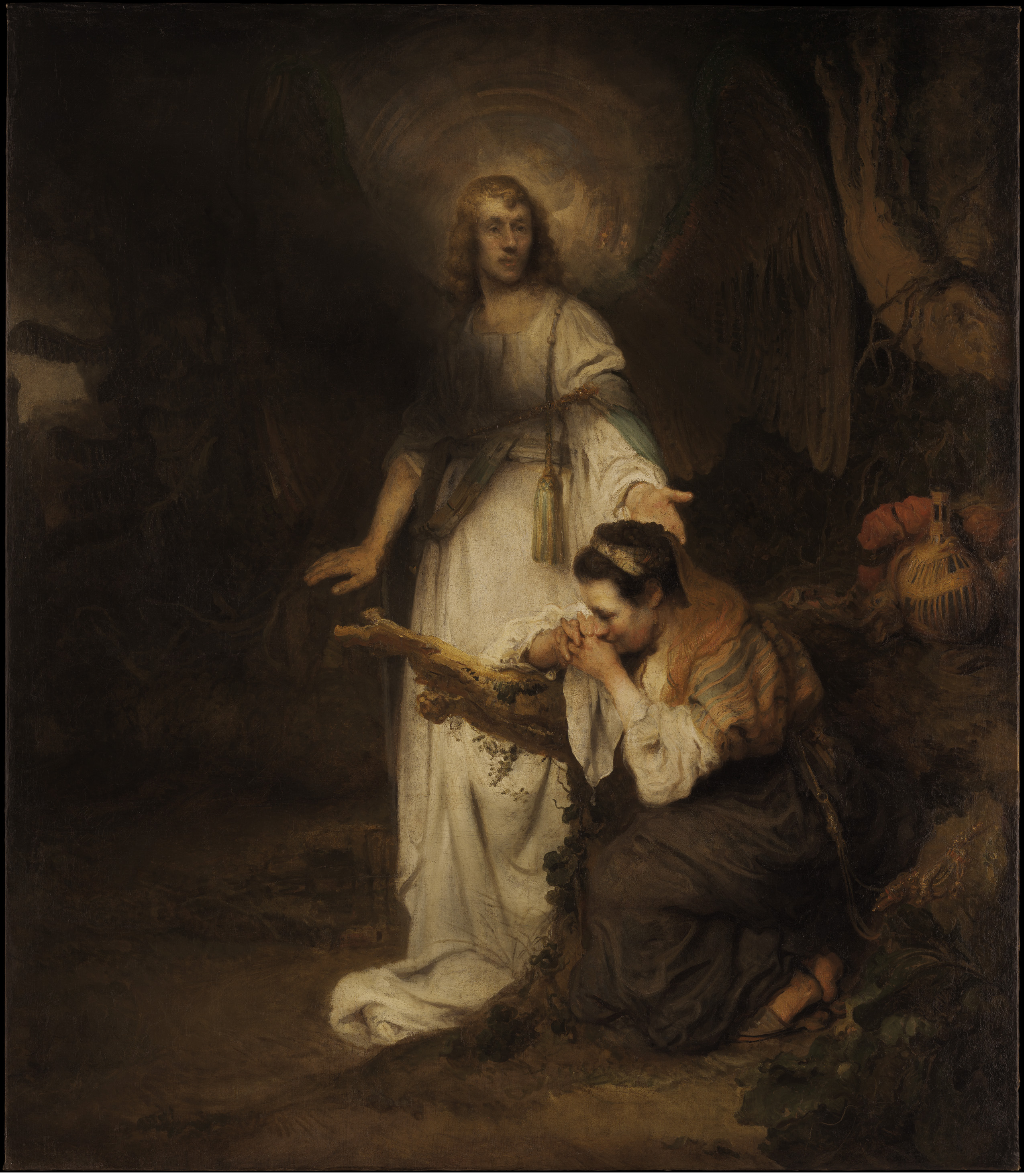
Hagar and the Angel (c. 1643–1645) by Carel Fabritius

Hagar and the Angel is an oil-on-canvas painting of a scene from the Book of Genesis by Carel Fabritius, created c.1643–1645 during that artist's time in Rembrandt's studio or shortly afterwards. It is now in the Leiden Collection in New York.

== Bibliography ==
- (in Dutch) Bijbelcitaten: Statenvertaling op bijbelsdigitaal.nl
- (in Dutch) Duparc, F.J., 2004, Carel Fabritius (1622–1654). Zijn leven en zijn werk, in: Carel Fabritius, 1622-1654, Zwolle, Waanders, p. 32-33
- (in Dutch) Seelig, G. & Suchtelen, A. van, 2004, Catalogus, in: Carel Fabritius, 1622-1654, Zwolle, Waanders, p. 85-90 (cat. 2)
- Duparc, F.J., 2006, "Results of the Recent Art-Historical and Technical Research on Carel Fabritius's Early Work", Oud Holland 119 (2006), p. 76-89
- Dominique Surh, 2017, "Hagar and the Angel" (CF-100), in: Arthur K. Wheelock Jr. (ed.), The Leiden Collection Catalogue, New York, 2017
