= Judith Yovel Recanati =

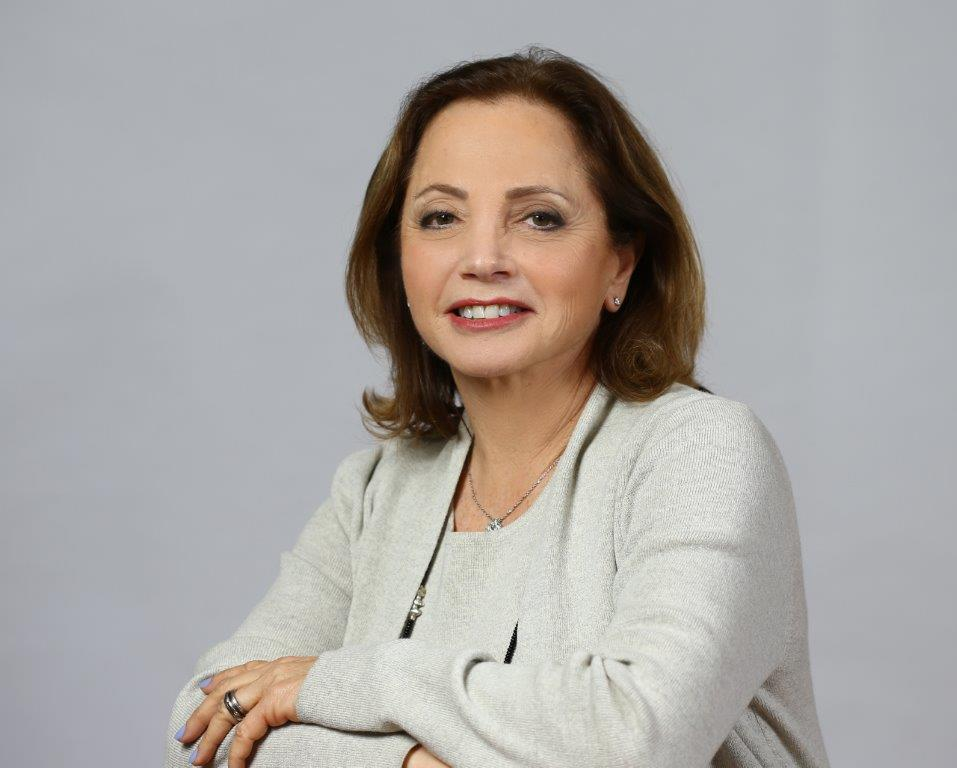
- Judith Yovel Recanati, 2017
- Born: Judith Recanati; 1948 (age 77–78); Israel
- Occupations: Social entrepreneur, philanthropist
- Known for: Founder of NATAL; Chairperson of the Gandyr Foundation
- Children: 3
- Family: Leon Yehuda Recanati (grandfather)

Judith Yovel Recanati (born 1948), often referred to as Yudi Yovel Recanati, is an Israeli social entrepreneur and philanthropist. She is the founder of NATAL – The Israel Trauma and Resiliency Center, and the chairperson of the Gandyr Foundation. Recanati is recognized for her work in developing social resilience and trauma treatment models in Israel, for which she received אhe President's Volunteer Award.

== Early life and family ==
Judith Recanati was born into the Recanati family, a dynasty central to Israel's financial history. She is the granddaughter of Leon Yehuda Recanati (1890–1945), a Zionist leader and philanthropist who founded the Israel Discount Bank in 1935. While her family is synonymous with the leadership of the IDB Holding Corporation, Recanati chose to focus on the philanthropic and social sectors.

== Personal life ==
Recanati was married to Israel Yovel, an Israeli gynecologist and businessman, until his passing in 2004. She has three daughters, Gili, Noa, and Daria, who are active partners in the family's philanthropic activities.

== Career and Philanthropy ==
=== NATAL — The Israel Trauma and Resiliency Center ===
In 1998, Recanati co-founded NATAL together with Dr. Yossi Hadar. The organization provides multidisciplinary support for those affected by war-related trauma and terror. NATAL's model has been adopted internationally, including partnerships in the United States to assist veterans.

=== The Gandyr Foundation and Education ===
Through the Gandyr Foundation, established in 2004, Recanati promotes civic engagement among Israeli young adults. Recanati has been a significant supporter of the Academic College of Tel Aviv-Yafo, funding the establishment of the Master's program in Youth Studies and providing graduate scholarships.

== Awards and Recognition ==
- The President's Volunteer Award (2008)
- Honorary Fellowship from Tel Aviv University (2012)
- The Rappaport Prize for Women Generating Change (2015)
- Honorary Doctorate, Tel Aviv University (2013)
- Honorary Doctorate, Ben Gurion University (2015)
- Honorary Doctorate, Ariel University (2025)

== See also ==
- Israel Discount Bank
