= Guma Aguiar =

Brazilian-born American businessman

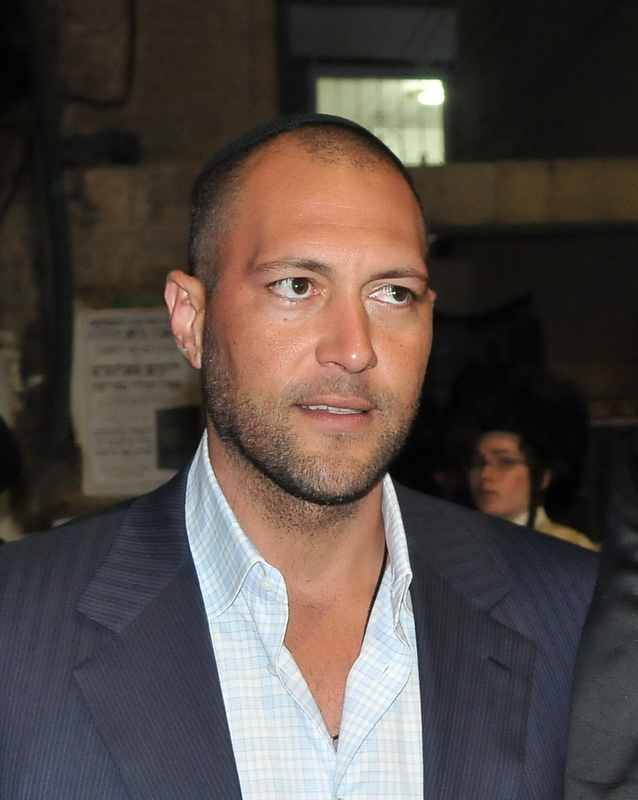
- Born: Guma Leandro Aguiar; May 31, 1977; Rio de Janeiro, Rio de Janeiro, Brazil
- Disappeared: June 19, 2012 (aged 35); Port Everglades, Broward County, Fort Lauderdale, Florida, U.S.
- Status: Missing for 14 years, 3 months and 3 days; Declared dead in absentia January 29, 2015 (aged 37)
- Other name: Guma Kaplan Aguiar
- Known for: June 2012 disappearance
- Spouse: Jamie Black (m. 2005)
- Children: 4

Guma Leandro Aguiar (May 31, 1977 – disappeared June 19, 2012; declared legally dead January 29, 2015) was a Brazilian-born American energy industrialist and millionaire businessman who split his time between the United States and Israel. Aguiar was recognized as a philanthropist who supported a variety of Jewish causes including Nefesh B'Nefesh and the March of the Living. In July 2009, Aguiar invested over $4 million (USD) in support of the Beitar Jerusalem Football Club.

On June 20, 2012, Aguiar was reported missing after his unoccupied boat was found on Fort Lauderdale Beach. The day before Aguiar went missing, a federal court judge ordered his mental health records be presented to the court as part of a lawsuit between him and his uncle Thomas Kaplan.

Aguiar was declared legally dead in January 2015.

== Early life and education ==
Aguiar was born on May 31, 1977 in Rio de Janeiro. He was one of four children of Ellen (née Kaplan), a Jewish mother, and Otto de Souza Aguiar, a Christian father. His mother is the sister of billionaire investor Thomas Kaplan, and his father was an artist and model. Though Ellen is halachically Jewish, she considers herself a born-again Christian; Guma was raised as a Christian and the rest of the Aguiar family practiced Christianity as well. At age 26, Aguiar became religiously Jewish after meeting rabbi Tovia Singer. However, because he was born to an halachically Jewish mother, he did not need to formally convert.

His family moved to Fort Lauderdale, Florida when Aguiar was one year old. He graduated from the Westminster Academy Christian School in 1995. Aguiar enrolled at Clemson University in Clemson, South Carolina but dropped out after one year.

== Career ==
Aguiar was the vice chairman and chief executive officer of Leor Energy. Aguiar began his career as a clerk on the floor of the NYMEX in 1999 where he focused on the energy markets, with particular emphasis on natural gas. Transitioning from daily trading activity to the long-term physical markets, Aguiar joined with his uncle, Thomas Kaplan, in 2001 to manage a portfolio of family investments ranging from venture capital to private equity and debt. During this time, he served as a director of several public and private companies and was given responsibility for creating a U.S.-based energy company focused on aggressive early-stage oil and gas exploration. After assembling a diversified portfolio of energy properties in Louisiana and Texas, ranging from unconventional natural gas to shallow oil, Aguiar identified and executed Leor's acquisition of its flagship property in the Deep Bossier of East Texas in 2003.

In 2005, under Aguiar's executive management, Leor Energy engineered financings which fully capitalized the projects in Leor Energy LP. Included in these transactions were Leor Energy Lp industrial alliance with Encana, a natural gas producer in North America and the Leor Energy Lp joint-venture partner in the Deep Bossier. Under Aguiar, a mezzanine financing with hedge-fund Amaranth Capital LLC was achieved. Leor Energy has a financial alliance with its first strategic equity partner, Goldman Sachs & Co.

Aguiar joined Cadence Resources in July 2002 and served as a Member of the Board of Directors of Corporate Development until June 30, 2003.

== Philanthropic activities ==
Aguiar was the director of the Lillian Jean Kaplan Foundation and was involved in numerous philanthropic activities. He donated more than US$8 million to fund the activities of Nefesh B'Nefesh, a Zionist organization which promotes Aliyah (Jewish immigration) from North America and the United Kingdom to Israel. He was a supporter of the March of the Living, which organizes educational programming in Poland and Israel to enable students to better understand the Holocaust and the rebirth of Zionism and the creation of the modern Jewish state of Israel.

For his philanthropic activities, in April 2009, The Jewish Week recognized Aguiar as one of the "36 under 36″ (one of 36 of the most influential Jewish leaders under the age of 36).

In 2008, Aguiar founded the "Defender of Jerusalem Award" which recognizes public figures who have taken uniquely strong stances in support of Jerusalem.

In October 2009, Aguiar and his wife Jamie served as the co-chairs of the "Facing Tomorrow" Conference in Jerusalem organized by Israel's President Shimon Peres. During the conference, Aguiar was featured on a panel with the President and offered his vision of Israeli society and culture from the perspective of one of the country's most recognized entrepreneurs.

== Jerusalem sports ==
On July 21, 2009, Aguiar announced an investment of over US$4 million to support the Beitar Jerusalem Football Team which, despite a massive fan following, had grown into financial distress and was on the brink of collapse prior to Aguiar's financial contributions. Aguiar was motivated to purchase the team out of his love for the sport combined with a passion for Jerusalem and Israel.

In September 2009, Aguiar took his commitment to Jerusalem sports to the next level when he invested over $1.5 million in the city's leading basketball franchise, Hapoel Jerusalem.

Since these investments, Aguiar became a fixture in Israeli social circles and regularly met with members of Knesset and local political and business leaders.

Aguiar managed the teams and was in contact with the general managers of both Betar (Itzik Kornfein) and Hapoel (Dani Klein). In November 2009, Aguiar travelled with Kornfein to Brazil with the goal of scouting out players for the Betar team. He made an effort to be at team practices and met with the players and staff of both teams.

Beitar fans attribute Beitar's winning the Toto Cup on 26 January 2010 to Aguiar's financial backing, although it was won while Aguiar was hospitalized in a psychiatric facility. About a half an hour after winning, Itzik Kornfein took the Toto Cup to the psychiatric hospital but was not permitted to enter. He asked the security staff to take in the trophy to the hospitalized Aguiar.

== Personal life ==
In 2005, Aguiar married his Westminster Academy high school sweetheart, Jamie Elizabeth Black. Jamie graduated from the University of Florida with a degree in Public Relations. They had four children: Jacob, Lilly, Jonathan, and Leo.The process of immigration to Israel was an act described by himself as a personal dream. Prior to his disappearance, Aguiar divided his time between the Yemin Moshe quarter in Jerusalem and South Florida.

Aguiar was friends with Alan Dershowitz. Aguiar was a Zionist.

== Criminal history ==
Aguiar pleaded no contest to drug charges in 2009 after police found marijuana in his car during a traffic stop in Florida. Aguiar publicly stated that the police were out to get him and that "When I got to the prison [an officer] took my kippah off and then tried to convert me to Christianity." Aguiar hired Alan Dershowitz to represent him.

Aguiar's wife Jamie filed a domestic violence protective order against him in the summer of 2011. He then filed for divorce, but both the domestic violence allegations and the divorce filing were stopped.

== Mental health ==
Aguiar's mother has said that Aguiar experienced his first psychotic episode at age 19 and that he was diagnosed with severe bipolar disorder and psychosis. Aguiar was admitted to psychiatric hospitals several times.

On January 14, 2010, Aguiar was involuntarily committed to a mental hospital in Israel by his mother. In 2011, due to his mental illness, his wife Jamie and mother Ellen petitioned a Miami-Dade judge for guardianship over Aguiar. The court agreed, and appointed an emergency guardianship over Aguiar.

Aguiar was sued by his uncle Thomas Kaplan. As part of that lawsuit, the judge presiding over the case, John O'Sullivan, found that Aguiar's psychosis "manifested itself in both grandiose and paranoid delusions," for example, Aguiar's belief that he (Aguiar) was being followed by snipers. On the day Aguiar disappeared, a federal judge in Florida issued an order appointing an independent medical examiner to see if Aguiar was psychologically sound enough for a deposition in the case.

Two days after his disappearance in June 2012, Aguiar's mother filed documents in Broward County, Florida court to become conservator of his nearly $100 million fortune. In Ellen Aguiar's petition, she wrote that Guma "disappeared as the result of mental derangement or other mental cause" or disappeared "under circumstances indicating that he may have died, either naturally, or accidentally." It further stated that he suffered from "severe bipolar disorder."

== Disappearance ==
On June 20, 2012, Aguiar's 31-foot, center console Jupiter boat, named the T.T. Zion, landed on Fort Lauderdale Beach east of East Las Olas Boulevard around 1:15 a.m., with its navigation lights on and engines still running, according to the Sun-Sentinel. Sea Tow, the company that Fort Lauderdale authorities contracted to tow the boat, said that the vessel appeared seaworthy and did not believe a mechanical problem had occurred. Aguiar's wallet and cell phone were found on board, but no sign of him or any other passenger was found. Authorities on ATVs searched up and down the beach, but found no sign of Aguiar. The Coast Guard commenced a search at sea. In July 2012 and June 2013, the Ft. Lauderdale Police Department said that even though the investigation remains open, there have been no significant leads in the case.

Aguiar was declared legally dead on January 29, 2015, two years and seven months after his disappearance.

== See also ==
- List of people who disappeared mysteriously at sea
