= Leon Recanati =

Israeli businessman and philanthropist

- ליאון רקנאטי
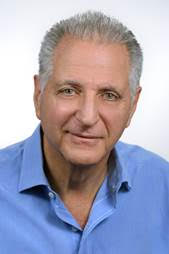
- Born: May 10, 1948 (age 78)
- Occupations: businessman and philanthropist
- Known for: co-chairman of IDB Holding
- Children: 3
- Relatives: Leon Yehuda Recanati (grandfather); Michael Recanati (cousin); Thomas Kaplan (son-in-law); Avraham Recanti (great-uncle)

Leon Yehuda Recanati (Hebrew: ליאון יהודה רקנאטי; born May 10, 1948) is an Israeli banker, businessman, and philanthropist. He is a member of the Recanati family, founders of Israel Discount Bank and the IDB Group.

== Biography ==
Leon Recanati was born in Tel Aviv to Mathilda (née Carasso) and Daniel Recanati, then an executive at Israel Discount Bank, and later the bank CEO. He is the grandson of Leon Yehuda Recanati (1890–1945), head of the Jewish community in Thessaloniki, who immigrated to Mandatory Palestine in 1935 and founded Israel Discount Bank. He studied at the Herzliya Hebrew Gymnasium. He later earned a master’s degree in business administration from the Hebrew University of Jerusalem.

== Business career ==
After completing his academic studies, Recanati joined Israel Discount Bank in 1971. His entry-level role as a cashier reflected a family policy, set by his father, that required members to begin at the bottom and thoroughly understand the bank before advancing to senior roles. He later served as deputy CEO and head of marketing and the branch network. During his tenure, he initiated the bank's technological services. He founded "Discount Initiatives for Culture and Art," supporting exhibitions, museums, and performing arts, as well as establishing the bank's collection of Israeli art.

In 1986, Recanati left the bank and joined the IDB Group, where he held executive roles, including Co-CEO of IDB Development Corporation and chairman of IDB Holdings, as well as Shufersal supermarkets, the energy group Delek, Clal Israel, Clal Industries, and Azorim real estate. He served as a board member in subsidiaries, including American Israeli Paper Mills, Scitex Corporation, El Yam Shipping, Discount Investment Corporation, and Elron Ventures. In 1998, Recanati began managing the family's business alongside his cousin Udi Recanati. After Raphael Recanati's passing, both were appointed co-chairs. In 2001, Udi resigned, and Leon became chairman of the IDB Group until its sale in May 2003 to Nochi Dankner, Itzhak Manor, and Avraham Livnat for 840$ million. In July 2003, Recanati founded GlenRock Israel, an investment company focusing on technology and life sciences.

In 2007, he purchased a 50.4% stake (73% total, with two minority partners) in the Gmul Investment Company for NIS 600 million, which was more than twice its market capitalization. Gmul had stakes in real estate, hotels, investments, and the automotive industry. It was founded in 1950 by Bank Hapoalim, the Histadrut labor federation, and several pension funds. Performance at Gmul deteriorated. In October 2011, he sold half of his 50.4% investment in Gmul to Itzhak Gvilli for NIS 20 million. He resigned as chairman of Gmul in July 2012. He is a shareholder and board member in companies such as Evogene, Kamada Ltd., and Mivtach Shamir Holdings Ltd..

== Social Involvement ==
Recanati is involved in educational and social development in Israel. In 1985, he responded to a call by Yitzhak Navon, the then minister of education, to assist the nascent science museum in Haifa. He has chaired the museum, now the Israel National Museum of Science, Technology, and Space, ever since. It is named in honor of his parents, Daniel and Matilda Recanati. In 2000, he founded Appleseeds Academy (Tapuach) to bridge the digital divide and promote social mobility in Israel through access to technology and knowledge. He established The Entrepreneurial Teacher Award (2004) for innovative teachers across all educational sectors, The Entrepreneurial Social Worker Award (2006) recognizing innovation in social welfare. In 2011, he founded the Salonika and Greece Jewry Heritage Center in Petah Tikva.

== Public Service ==
As of July 2025, he is chairman of Madatech – Israel National Museum of Science, Technology, and Space; vice chairman, Israel Cancer Association; president, Appleseeds Academy; chairman, Rabinovich Foundation’s Cinema and Experimental Theatre Project; trustee, Tel Aviv University; chairman, Lahav Executive Education, faculty of management, Tel Aviv University, founder and board member, Salonika and Greece Jewry Heritage Center; trustee, Yad Sarah; chairman, Yahel – Leon Recanati family foundation; chairman, Leon Recanati scholarship fund.

In the past, he was a member of the board of governors and executive committee, Hebrew University of Jerusalem; board member and chair of the development committee, Tel Aviv University; member of the board of governors, Weizmann Institute of Science; trustee, Bezalel Academy of Arts and Design; board and trustee, Israel Museum; board and trustee, Tel Aviv Museum of Art; trustee, Anu – Museum of the Jewish People; board member and trustee, Alut (Israel Society for Children and Adults with Autism).

== Awards and honors ==
- 1999 – Honorary doctorate, Technion – for visionary contributions to education, science, culture, and health in Israel.
- 2002 – Honorary doctorate, Tel Aviv University – for long-standing dedication to education and educational innovation.
- 2007 – Manufacturers Association of Israel President’s Award for Volunteer Industrialist – for significant contributions to education and faith in the next generation.
- 2009 – Captain’s Award, Hadassah College of Technology – for volunteer efforts and excellence in education.
- 2011 – Honorary citizen of Haifa – for over 30 years of contributions to Madatech and the city’s educational institutions.
- 2012 – Knight, Order of the Star of Italy.
- 2016 – Honorary citizen of Ramla – for contributions to the city’s children and community, including the establishment of a technology campus and knowledge center.

== Personal life ==
Since 1988, Leon Recanati has been separated from his spouse, filmmaker and artist Mira Recanati. They have two children: Daniel (born 1976) and Dafna (born 1970), who is married to American philanthropist and investor Thomas Kaplan He also has a daughter, May (born 1991), from a previous relationship with Shula Recanati.
