= Golden Minerals =

- Formerly: Apex Silver Mines
- Traded as: AMEX: AUMN
- Industry: Mining, precious metals
- Founded: 1993
- Founder: Thomas Kaplan
- Website: www.goldenminerals.com

Golden Minerals (formerly known as Apex Silver Mines), was founded by Thomas Kaplan, from Denver, Colorado. It is a US-American transnational mining corporation with a tax haven address in the Cayman Islands. Following its reorganization under Chapter 11 bankruptcy in 2009, it re-emerged as Golden Minerals Corporation. It is a publicly traded company on AMEX under symbol AUMN.

== History ==
=== Apex Silver Mines ===
Since its start in 1993, Apex Silver Mines Ltd. had become an exploration and development company and producer of silver, zinc and lead. Apex's largest asset was the San Cristóbal open-pit silver, lead and zinc mine located in Potosí Department, Bolivia. In September 2006, Sumitomo Corporation of Japan acquired a 35% share of the facility.

On January 12, 2009, Apex Silver and its wholly owned subsidiary, ASMC, filed voluntary petitions for relief under Chapter 11 of the Bankruptcy Code with the Bankruptcy Court. The Plan was approved by the Bankruptcy Court on March 4, 2009.

=== Reemergence as Golden Minerals ===
Golden Minerals emerged from Apex Chapter 11 on March 24, 2009. Under the Plan, all the assets of Apex Silver, other than a small cash reserve for the payment of liquidation expenses, were transferred to Golden Minerals Company, a Delaware corporation that is Apex Silver's successor. Apex Silver was being liquidated in accordance with Cayman Islands law. Golden Minerals resides in Golden, Colorado. Golden Minerals owns and controls many exploration properties located primarily in the high potential mining districts in Latin America, including the feasibility stage El Quevar Project in northern Argentina.

In connection with Apex' emergence from bankruptcy as a newly formed Delaware corporation named Golden Minerals Company, Apex sold their remaining 65% interest in the San Cristóbal mine to Sumitomo. Golden Minerals continued to operate the San Cristóbal Mine on behalf of Sumitomo until June 30, 2010, for which it received $11.4 million in revenues, including reimbursement of $5.4 million in administrative costs. This was Golden Minerals, primary source of revenue during this period.

== Apex Mines ==
Formerly, Apex owned twelve properties:

- Bolivia
  - San Cristóbal (silver, zinc, lead)
  - Cobrizos (silver, copper)
  - Rincón del Tigre (platinum, palladium)
- Kyrgyzstan
  - Jamgyr (gold)
- Mexico
  - San Luis del Cordero (silver, zinc, copper)
  - San Juan del Cordero (silver, zinc, lead)
  - Platosa (silver, zinc, lead)
  - El Aguila (gold, silver)
  - Zacatecas (silver, zinc, lead)
- Peru
  - Aguila (silver, zinc, lead)
  - Aventura III (gold, silver)
  - Jehuamarca (silver, gold)
