= Gideon's Crossing =

American medical drama

- Genre: Medical drama
- Created by: Paul Attanasio
- Based on: The Measure of Our Days and Second Opinions by Jerome Groopman
- Starring: Andre Braugher; Rubén Blades; Eric Dane; Russell Hornsby; Ravi Kapoor; Sophie Keller; Hamish Linklater; Rhona Mitra; Kevin J. O'Connor; Meagan Gregory; Jascha Washington; Brian Wiltshire
- Composer: Steve Porcaro
- Country of origin: United States
- Original language: English
- No. of seasons: 1
- No. of episodes: 21

Production
- Executive producers: Paul Attanasio; Katie Jacobs; Matt Reeves
- Production locations: Los Angeles, California, United States
- Running time: 60 minutes
- Production companies: Heel and Toe Films; Touchstone Television

Original release
- Network: ABC
- Release: October 10, 2000 – April 16, 2001

Gideon's Crossing is an American medical drama starring Andre Braugher. The series is loosely based on the experience of real-life physician Jerome Groopman and his book The Measure of Our Days. It premiered on ABC on October 10, 2000, and ran for one season, with its last episode airing on April 9, 2001, with one episode ("The Old School") remaining unaired.

== Cast ==
- Andre Braugher as Dr. Ben Gideon
- Rubén Blades as Dr. Max Cabranes
- Eric Dane as Dr. Wyatt Cooper
- Russell Hornsby as Dr. Aaron Boies
- Ravi Kapoor as Dr. Siddartha Shandor
- Sophie Keller as Dr. Maya Stiles
- Hamish Linklater as Dr. Bruce Cherry
- Rhona Mitra as Dr. Alejandra Klein
- Kevin J. O'Connor as Dr. Michael Pirandello
- Meagan Gregory as Rose Gideon
- Jascha Washington as Eli Gideon
- Brian Wiltshire as Charlie Gideon

== Episodes ==
No.	Title	Directed by	Written by	Original release date	Prod. code
1	"The Gift"	Matt Reeves	Paul Attanasio	October 10, 2000	G–221
While coping with his wife's death from cancer, Dr. Ben Gideon deals with an arrogant cancer patient who dares him to cure him. In the meantime, Metropolitan residents are getting headaches from a young man with a mysterious anemia and an old woman with a sick dog.
2	"The Way"	Alex Graves	Unknown	October 18, 2000	G–222
Gideon tries to help a breast-cancer patient who doesn't trust Western medicine. Meanwhile, Ollie attempts to treat a middle-aged man who has daily headaches from his job and Cooper has a patient with a rather embarrassing condition.
3	"A Routine Case"	Unknown	Unknown	October 25, 2000	G–224
A cleaning lady Gideon has known for years comes to the hospital with leukemia. Also, Gideon's own housekeeper takes the day off, leading him to deal with minor family emergencies and Bruce ponders the cause of a Korean violin prodigy's ear infection.
4	"The Race"	Unknown	Unknown	November 1, 2000	G–223
The mayor of Boston, a patient of Gideon's, is diagnosed with cancer, so he has to consider his treatment options before his planned race for the Senate, as well as treatments that could have an effect on his sex life. In the meantime, Sid has difficulty treating an 18-year-old with a cough who was instructed not to answer any questions and Wyatt flirts over the phone with Ollie while his wife Joanne is in Germany.
5	"The Mistake"	Unknown	Unknown	November 8, 2000	G–228
A man comes to the hospital on a Saturday morning, gets treated by six residents and dies on a Sunday night. His case his examined on a Monday morning at an "m and m" conference, and has a profound impact on those involved.
6	"Freak Show"	Unknown	Unknown	November 15, 2000	G–230
A breast-cancer patient, who is acquainted with Gideon, has a complication she is reluctant to reveal to her doctors - and discuss with her husband. In the meantime, a man's nose is bitten off during a bar fight and Brucie has to find it with assistance from the man's girlfriend. Also, Joanne submits Wyatt to a magazine that is preparing an article entitled "Boston's Sexiest Doctors".
7	"The Lottery"	Unknown	Unknown	November 22, 2000	G–226
Gideon has developed a drug that could revolutionize treatment for melanoma. The drug is given approval for trials and he offers it to one of his patients before learning that trial subjects must be chosen by a lottery. Meanwhile, Sid attempts to find the cause of a man's anemia and has to go on a date with an Indian woman with whom his parents fixed him up.
8	"Father Knows Best"	Unknown	Unknown	December 6, 2000	G–225
A rich woman with a blood disease picks on the staff, including Gideon and Cabranes. In the meantime, the residents set out to fulfill a dying patient's last wish to be mummified.
9	"Is There a Wise Man in the House?"	Unknown	Unknown	December 20, 2000	G–229
During the holidays, Gideon attempts to treat an anemic astronomer who disagrees with the hematology chief. Also, Cabranes volunteers to sing for the hospital's "holiday extravaganza", but Stiles doubts his talent.
10	"Clinical Enigma"	Unknown	Unknown	December 27, 2000	G–236
A man whom Gideon once treated for cancer comes back to the hospital with a fever and a son who has a chip on his shoulder. Meanwhile, Boies is unable to determine what caused a 35-year-old woman to have a stroke. Also, Stiles requests a day off and the widow of the man died from the mistakes made by the residents considers suing the hospital.
11	"Hinkytown"	Unknown	Unknown	January 15, 2001	G–231
Staffers look for bacteria that are causing infections in patients who have no connection other than the fact that they're sick. In the meantime, rumors about the Porter lawsuit spread around the hospital, a brash pharmaceutical saleswoman doesn't get much attention - at first - and Cooper is unable to reach Joanne in Wyoming.
12	"Dr. Cherry Must Be Stopped"	Unknown	Unknown	January 22, 2001	G–237
The flirtatious daughter of the hospital's psychiatry chief commits suicide - after she leaves a note accusing Cherry of sexual misconduct. Also, Boies grows more anxious as preparations for the Porter malpractice trial heat up.
13	"Orphans"	Unknown	Unknown	January 29, 2001	G–238
A deaf 14-year-old girl asks for a cochlear implant, but her parents, who are also deaf, are against it. In the meantime, a lawyer for the hospital asks Gideon out and a patient Sid pronounced dead turns out to be alive, but in a vegetative state.
14	"Life Sentences"	Jon Hutman	Samantha Howard Corbin	February 5, 2001	G–239
A frequent drug-test volunteer to whom Ollie has gotten close is diagnosed with leukemia. He responds to an experimental treatment, only to get arrested for robbery, but the bright side is that he can't be treated in jail. Also, Brucie has a hard time treating a Haitian patient with symptoms of meningitis who keeps repeating the word "biskit", so a nurse practitioner from New Orleans offers to help Brucie understand what it means.
15	"Prodigal Dad"	Leslie Libman	Eric Overmyer	February 12, 2001	G–240
Boies' father comes to the hospital as a visitor, then ends up as a patient after coughing incessantly in front of Sid. In the meantime, Gideon wonders how a teenage hemophiliac has developed a resistance to the clotting factor. There are also developments in the Brucie-Money and Oliie-John relationships.
16	"The Others"	Unknown	Unknown	March 5, 2001	G–241
Cabranes has a psychiatric session with a multiple-personality disorder patient who threatens the hospital with a gun. Meanwhile, Clark Boies begins his treatments for lung cancer, Sid gets testy after giving up smoking, Wyatt reunites with Joanne, Ollie receives two unsigned floral bouquets and Gideon has more or less of a date.
17	"Flashpoint"	Unknown	Unknown	March 12, 2001	G–243
Ellenor Frutt is rushed to the hospital after collapsing during her pregnancy and tells Gideon that the baby comes first if anything happens. In the meantime, Wyatt and Joanne have difficult discussions about her pregnancy during their divorce proceedings. Also, Brucie must deal with a hyperactive 8-year-old and his equally hyperactive mother and a stranger claiming to be an apartment hunter visits Ollie and Sid. This episode concludes a crossover with The Practice that begins on "Gideon's Crossover".
18	"Filaments & Ligatures"	Unknown	Unknown	March 19, 2001	G–242
Two patients are in desperate need of a liver transplant when a brain-dead accident victim shows up at the hospital, so Brucie must convince her parents to donate her organs. In the meantime, Clark Boies' tumor gets smaller, his son Aaron confronts Ollie's stalker and Brucie reaches a crossroads in his relationship with Money.
19	"The Crash"	Unknown	Unknown	April 2, 2001	G–244
Gideon is having a bad day. His son Eli has hit another boy in the head with a brick at school and one of Cabranes' patients wants a fetal-cell transplant that Ben is strictly against. Also, Ben overrules Sid who suspects that a friend's rich 15-year-old daughter has endocarditis.
20	"Heart of Glass"	Unknown	Unknown	April 9, 2001	G–245
Gideon gets severe heartburn and faints in an exam room. His EKG results are "ambiguous," but he refuses to believe there is something wrong with him, even as Cabranes says it could be a heart attack. Meanwhile, Eli, who has been suspended from school, waits outside his father's office to have lunch with him.
21	"The Old School"	Unknown	Unknown	April 16, 2001	G–227

== See also ==
- List of The Practice episodes - includes crossover episode "Gideon's Crossover"
