= Anatomy of Hope =

Book by Jerome Groopman

The Anatomy of Hope: How People Prevail in the Face of Illness
- Author: Jerome Groopman
- Language: English
- Published: 2003, Random House
- Publication place: United States
- Media type: Print, e-book, audiobook
- Pages: 272 pages
- ISBN: 978-0-375-50638-3

The Anatomy of Hope: How People Prevail in the Face of Illness is a 2003 book by Jerome Groopman. The book was first published in hardback on December 23, 2003, through Random House and deals with the subject of hope and its effect on illnesses.

== Synopsis ==
In the book Groopman investigates how hope affects human beings that are either undergoing medical care or have a family member that is critically ill. He distinguishes the differences between the types of hope, such as whether or not someone is experiencing false or true hope. For the book, Groopman visits several laboratories that are researching the biological basis of hope to discover whether or not hope can scientifically change someone's physical well-being.

== Reception ==
Critical reception for Anatomy of Hope has been positive. The New York Times praised Groopman for never definitively defining hope in the book, as they felt that this made the work succeed that much more in making its point.

== Adaptation ==
In 2007 HBO began work on a television series based upon the book with screenwriters Rafael Yglesias and Tom Schulman. The series, which would have been produced and directed by J. J. Abrams, would have been a medical drama. A pilot episode was created and starred John Ortiz, Simon Callow, and Valarie Pettiford, but the series was never picked up.
