= Overseas Shipholding Group =

United States-flag shipping company

- Traded as: NYSE: OSG
- Industry: Maritime transport (shipping)
- Founded: 1948; 78 years ago
- Headquarters: Tampa, Florida, U.S.
- Owner: Saltchuk (2024–present)
- Website: www.osg.com

Overseas Shipholding Group (OSG) is an American shipping company that operates a fleet of twenty-four oil tankers and oil tug-barges. In 2024, the company was acquired by Seattle-based transportation company Saltchuk.

== History ==
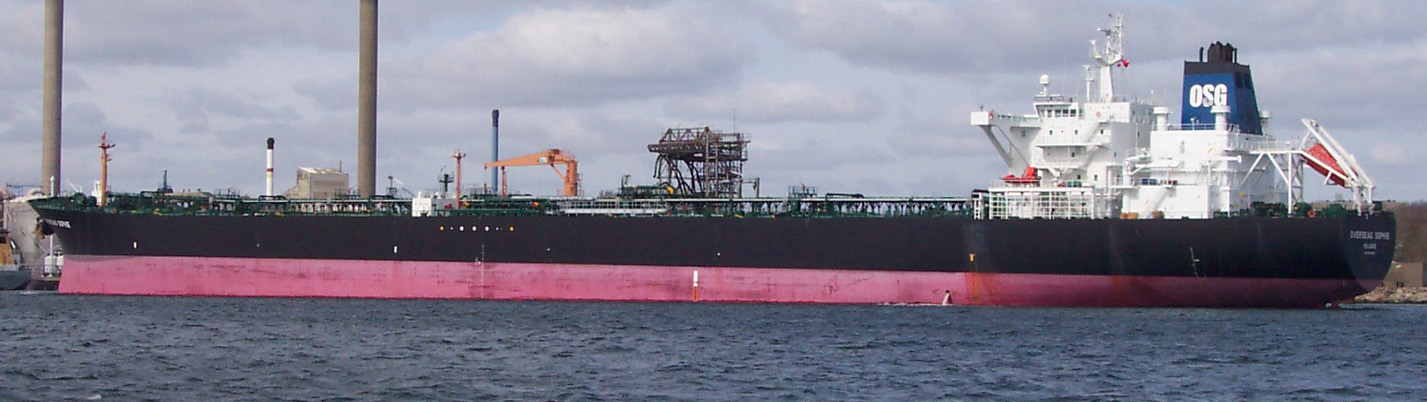
Overseas Sophie in dock in Fredericia, Little Belt, Denmark

Founded in 1948, Overseas Shipholding Group (OSG) is based in Tampa, Florida, United States. It has offices in Tampa, Florida and Newark, Delaware, with nearly 900 sea and shore-based employees.

In 1969, under the leadership of Raphael Recanati, OSG began acquiring tanker ships to transport oil from Alaska to the lower 48 U.S. states. In the 1990s, OSG began to acquire luxury cruise liners.

In 1995, the cruise ships resulted in losses of over $12 million to OSG. As a result of the losses, Michael Recanati, the son of Raphael Recanati, was reported to have been forced to leave OSG.

The company filed for Chapter 11 bankruptcy in 2012 after the SEC accused CEO Morten Arntzen and CFO Miles Itkin of falsifying financial statements. In 2017, the company paid a $75,000 fine to the SEC to settle the securities fraud allegations. Former CFO Miles Itkin also paid a separate $75,000 fine. The executives were sued by OSG and agreed to pay a $16.25 million settlement in 2015.

In July 2024 its stock was delisted from the NYSE as the company was acquired by the private company Saltchuk.

== Spin-off of international business and fleet ==
In 2016, as part of its restructuring, OSG spun-off its large international fleet and business, concentrating solely on its U.S. flag business.

The international activities and fleet were re-incorporated into a new company, International Seaways, Inc., based in New York City, and listed on the New York Stock Exchange (NYSE) under ticker NYSE: INSW.

== See also ==
- Alaska Tanker Company, since 2020 a wholly owned subsidiary of Overseas Shipholding Group, Inc.
