= NATAL Israel =

Israeli organization

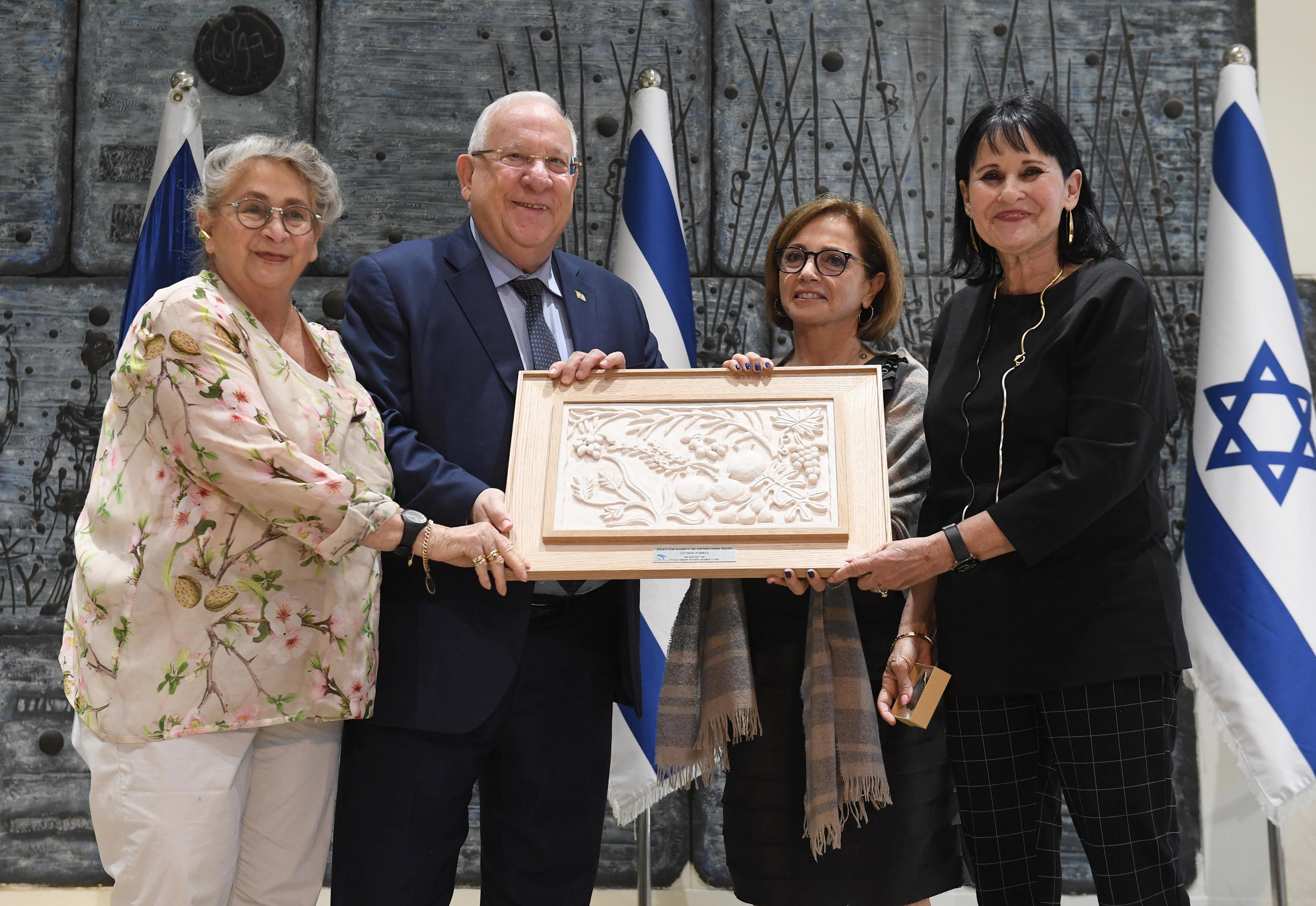
Reuven Rivlin hosting an event commemorating 20 years of activity for NATAL Israel, March 2018

NATAL - Israel Trauma and Resiliency Center (established: 1998, Tel Aviv) is a non-profit organization founded by Yossi Hadar and Judith Yovel Recanati. NATAL specializes in the field of war-and-terror-related trauma, PTSD and resiliency-building among civil society. NATAL was the first center in Israel to standardize and create protocols for coping with trauma and resilience-building in a social general society context. Natal is also a partner of the Israel Coalition for Trauma.
