= The Measure of Our Days =

Book by Jerome Groopman

- First edition
- Author: Jerome Groopman
- Language: English
- Genre: Non-fiction
- Publisher: Viking Adult
- Publication date: 1997
- Publication place: United States
- Media type: Hardback
- Pages: 224 pp (first edition, hardback)
- ISBN: 0-670-87570-8 (first edition, hardback)

The Measure of Our Days: A Spiritual Exploration of Illness (alternately New Beginnings at Life's End) is a book of case studies of patients by Jerome Groopman, published by Penguin Books in October 1997. It was later serialized in The New Yorker and in The Boston Globe Sunday Magazine. In 2000, it became the inspiration for the TV show Gideon's Crossing, which was nominated for a Golden Globe.
