= Raphael Recanati =

Greek-born Israeli-American businessman, banker, and philanthropist

- רפאל רקנאטי
- Born: February 12, 1924; Salonika, Greece
- Died: May 28, 1999 (aged 75); New York City, U.S.
- Occupations: Businessman, banker, philanthropist
- Spouse(s): Dina Hettena (m. 1946, died, his)
- Children: 2, including Michael Recanati (son)
- Father: Leon Yehuda Recanati
- Relatives: Leon Recanati (nephew)

Raphael Recanati (Hebrew: רפאל רקנאטי; 1924–1999) was a Greek-born Israeli-American businessman, banker, and philanthropist. He was the founder and chairman of the Overseas Shipholding Group. He was the chairman of the Israel Discount Bank from 1982 to 1986.

== Early life and education ==
Recanati was born in Salonika, Greece, the son of Leon Yehuda Recanati. He immigrated to Mandatory Palestine with his family in 1935, where he was educated. Meanwhile, his father founded the Israel Discount Bank in 1935. Recanati served in the Palmach, when he helped bring Egyptian Jews into Palestine (modern-day Israel).

== Career ==
Recanati founded the Israel-America Shipping Line, later known as the Overseas Shipholding Group, in 1948. He served as its founding chairman. He subsequently served as the "chairman of its finance and development committee". In 1949 Recanati founded a subsidiary of his family bank in New York City known as the Israel Discount Bank of New York.

Recanati served as the managing director of his family bank, the Israeli Discount Bank, in 1965. By then, the bank had an office in New York City. By 1970, he founded its investment banking subsidiary. He subsequently co-founded two more subsidiaries, the Discount Investment Corporation and the PEC Israel Economic Corporation New York. He served as the chairman of the Israel Discount Bank from 1982 to 1986.

In 1986, Recanati was suspended for three months by the Bank of Israel over a dispute in his role in the 1983 Israel bank stock crisis. He was convicted and sentenced to an eight-month sentence in Jerusalem over allegations of fraud. One of five charges was quashed on appeal resulting in a suspended sentence.

== Personal life ==
Recanati married to Dina Hettena in 1946. They had two sons. They resided in Manhattan, New York, East Hampton, New York and in Herzliya Pituach in Israel. Recanati died of a heart failure in 1999. He was seventy-five years old.

=== Philanthropy ===
Recanati made large charitable contributions to the Beth Israel Medical Center, a hospital based in New York City where the Recanati Cardiology Research Fund and the Recanati/Horowitz Cardiology Diagnostic Research Fund was named in his honor. He also endowed the Recanati/Miller Transplantation Institute at Mount Sinai Hospital. Further donations went to the UJA-Federation of New York.

Recanati endowed the Recanati Israel Student Exchange Fellowships at Yeshiva University, where he was a guardian. He also endowed the Recanati course at the Rabbi Isaac Elchanan Theological Seminary. Additionally, he endowed the Dina and Raphael Recanati Professorship in Medicine at the Harvard Medical School, which is held by Dr. Jerome Groopman.

In Israel, Recanati served on the boards of trustees of the Weizmann Institute of Science, the American Friends of Ben-Gurion University of the Negev, and the American Friends of Tel Aviv University, where he endowed the Recanati School of Business. He also endowed the Raphael Recanati Genetic Institute at the Beilinson Hospital, in the Petah Tikva-based Rabin Medical Center. The Raphael Recanati International School at the Interdisciplinary Center Herzliya was named in his honor.
