= Jerome Groopman =

American medical doctor and author

- Education: Columbia University (BA, MD)
- Occupations: Writer, professor of medicine
- Writing career
- Notable works: The Measure of Our Days; Anatomy of Hope

Jerome E. Groopman is an American physician and medical writer. He has been a staff writer in medicine and biology for The New Yorker since 1998.

He is the Dina and Raphael Recanati Chair of Medicine at Harvard Medical School, Chief of Experimental Medicine at Beth Israel Deaconess Medical Center, and author of five books, all written for a general audience.

He has published some 150 scientific articles and has written several op-ed pieces on medicine for The New York Times, The Washington Post, and The New Republic.

== Career ==
Groopman received his BA and MD from Columbia University and was at the Massachusetts General Hospital for his internship and residency in internal medicine. This was followed by fellowships in hematology and oncology at the University of California Los Angeles and the Dana–Farber Cancer Institute in Boston.

Much of Groopman's research has focused on the basic mechanisms of cancer and AIDS. He did seminal work on identifying growth factors which may restore the depressed immune systems of AIDS patients. He performed the first clinical trials in a technique that augments blood cell production in immunodeficient HIV-infected patients and has been a major participant in the development of many AIDS-related therapies including AZT. Recently, Groopman has extended the research infrastructure in genetics and cell biology to studies in breast cancer and neurobiology.

== Popular science works ==
The first book written by Groopman was The Measure of Our Days, published in 1997. He also published Second Opinions in 2000 and Anatomy of Hope in 2004. His 2007 book How Doctors Think rapidly rose to the top of the New York Times bestseller list when it was released. He further wrote, with his wife, Pamela Hartzband, an endocrinologist, the book Your Medical Mind (2011). Groopman was the guest editor for the 2008 edition of the yearly anthology The Best American Science and Nature Writing.

== In popular culture ==
The lead character in the 2000 TV series Gideon's Crossing, played by Andre Braugher, was loosely based on Groopman and his book The Measure of Our Days.

== Bibliography ==
=== Books ===
- Groopman, Jerome (1997). The measure of our days : new beginnings at life's end. New York: Viking.
- — (2000). Second opinions : stories of intuition and choice in a changing world of medicine. New York: Viking.
- — (2004). Anatomy of hope : how people prevail in the face of illness. New York: Random House.
- — (2007). How doctors think. Boston: Houghton Mifflin.
- —, ed. (2008). The best American science and nature writing 2008. Mariner Books.
- —, ed. (2010). The best American science writing, 2010. New York: Ecco.
- Groopman, Jerome; Hartzband, Pamela (2011). Your medical mind : how to decide what is best for you. New York: Penguin.

=== Essays and reporting ===
- Groopman, Jerome (December 22–29, 2014). "Can AIDS be cured? Researchers get closer to outwitting a killer". Medical Dispatch. The New Yorker. 90 (41): 78–86.
- — (May 27, 2019). "Medicine in mind : psychiatry's fraught history". The Critics. Books. The New Yorker. 95 (14): 66–69. (Note: Online version is titled "The troubled history of psychiatry".)
- — (April 5, 2021). "Beyond the vaccine : preventing another pandemic will be a political task as much as a medical one". The Critics. Books. The New Yorker. 97 (7): 55–59. (Note: Online version is titled "The politics of stopping pandemics".)
- Jerome Groopman, "The Scalpel and the Pen: What medical narratives teach us", The New Yorker, 25 July 2022, pp. 66–68.
- Jerome Groopman, "The Human Mosaic: Why to live is to mutate" (review of Roxanne Khamsi, Beyond Inheritance, Riverhead), The New Yorker, 13 April 2026, pp. 73–76. "Recent work in genetics is highlighting the importance of mutation as intrinsic to the system by which cells reproduce." (p. 73.)

== See also ==
- Physician writer
