= Thomas Kaplan =

American businessman and art collector

Thomas S. Kaplan
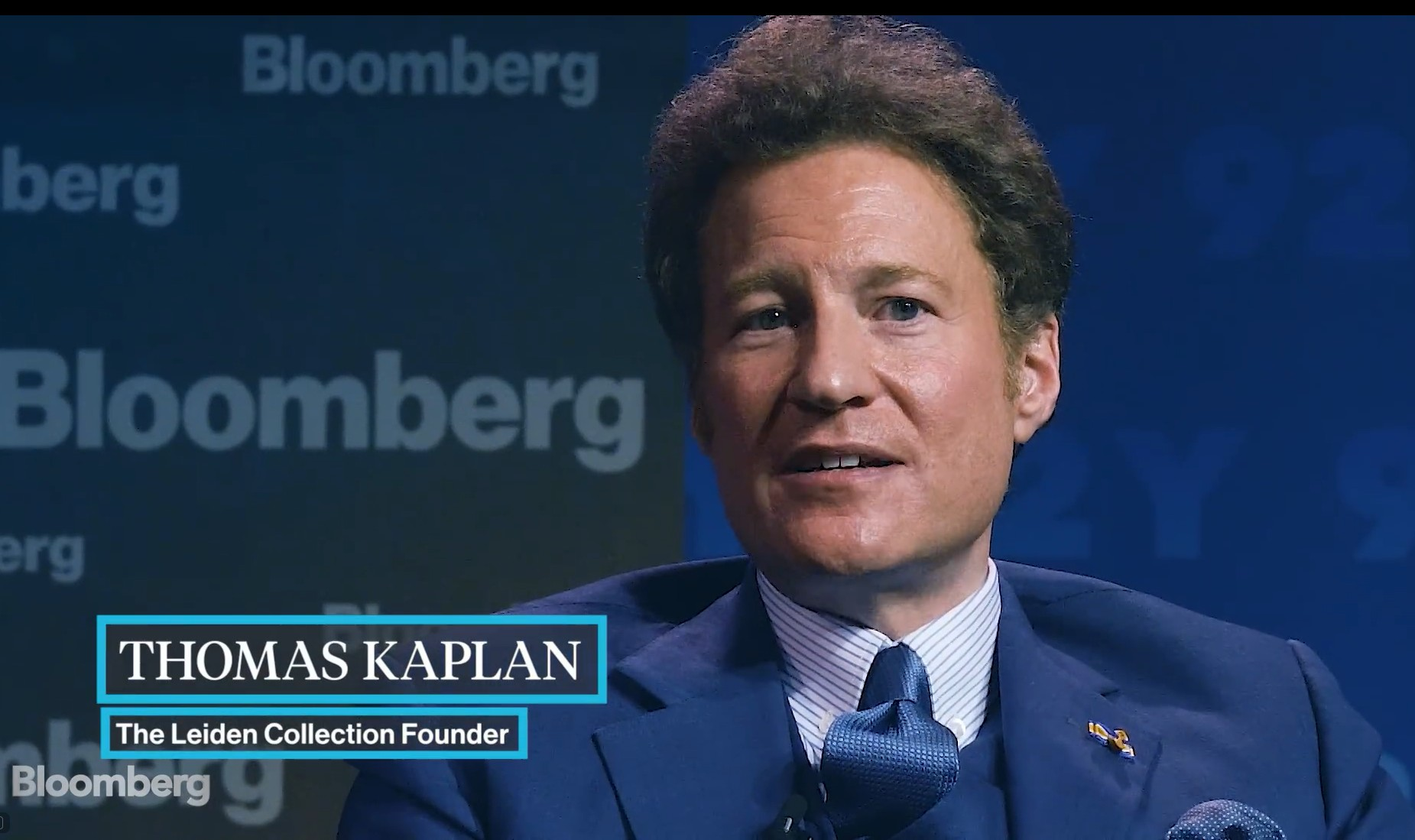
- Born: September 14, 1962 (age 64); New York City, U.S.
- Education: Oxford University (BA, MA, PhD.)
- Occupations: Investor, conservationist, philanthropist
- Spouse: Dafna Recanati
- Children: 3
- Relatives: Leon Recanati (father-in-law)
- Honours: Officier, Ordre national de la Légion d'honneur Commandeur, Ordre des Arts et des Lettres Officer, Order of Orange-Nassau
- Website: https://www.theleidencollection.com/

Thomas Scott Kaplan (born September 14, 1962) is a Franco-American businessman, philanthropist and art collector. He is the world's largest private collector of Rembrandt's works and among the world's leading investors in gold and silver.

Kaplan is the chairman and chief investment officer of The Electrum Group LLC, a New York City-based investment, advisory and asset management firm with a focus on the natural resources sector. From 2017 to 2023 he served as chairman of the International Alliance for the Protection of Heritage in Conflict Areas (ALIPH), a Geneva-based foundation established by France and the United Arab Emirates.

== Early life and education ==
Born in New York City, Kaplan is the son of Lillian Jean Kaplan and Jason "Jay" Kaplan. He and his family are Jewish.

In his youth, Kaplan developed a passion for wildlife conservation and for Rembrandt, which later inspired him to found the field conservation group Panthera and The Leiden Collection, the world's largest private grouping of works from the Dutch Golden Age.

At Oxford University, Kaplan earned bachelor's, master's and doctoral degrees in history. Under the supervision of Sir Michael Howard, then Regius Professor of History, and Chichele Professor of War Robert O'Neill, he wrote his doctoral dissertation on the Malayan counterinsurgency and the manner in which commodities influence strategic planning. While earning his Ph.D., Kaplan worked as an analyst covering Israeli companies publicly traded in the U.S. On a business trip, he met his future wife, Dafna Recanati (the daughter of Israeli investor Leon Recanati), who had attended the same Swiss boarding school as Kaplan, Institut Le Rosey. Her mother, artist Mira Recanati, introduced him to Israeli investor Avi Tiomkin, who hired him as a junior partner in 1991. Kaplan had impressed Tiomkin by correctly predicting Saddam Hussein's 1990 invasion of Kuwait several years before it took place. When Tiomkin decided to concentrate his investments solely in Israel in 1993, Kaplan moved on to pursue his own entrepreneurial ventures.

== Career ==
=== Apex Silver ===
Inspired by Marc Faber, who held that precious metals were insurance against the "monetary foolishness" of central governments, Kaplan focused on natural resources investing. In 1993, with silver trading below $4 per ounce, he founded Apex Silver Mines to capitalize on the improving supply/demand fundamentals of the precious metal. While he was chairman and chief executive officer of Apex, his team, led by chief geologist Dr. Larry Buchanan discovered and financed the mining of San Cristobal in Bolivia, one of the largest zinc, lead and silver deposits in the world. Kaplan retired from Apex Silver at the end of 2004 to pursue exploration opportunities in platinum group metals and energy.

In 2003, a company related to Kaplan became the largest investor in African Platinum Plc (then known as Southern African Resources Plc). That same year, Kaplan founded Leor Exploration & Production LLC, which became the fastest-growing privately held hydrocarbon exploration and production company in the United States.

=== Pivot to gold and silver ===
In 2007, concerned that market conditions globally were "too good" and determined to sell his "economically sensitive assets", Kaplan pivoted into gold and silver, which he regarded as currencies rather than just commodities.

In the spring of 2007 Kaplan sold his position in African Platinum as part of a transaction in which the company was acquired by Impala Platinum Limited, at a valuation of $580 million. In November 2007, Leor's natural gas assets in Texas were sold to Encana (now Ovintiv) for $2.55 billion.

Kaplan has been labeled "Gold's Evangelist" and was quoted in 2009 saying "I can find no better time than now to recommend its purchase to others. Some will say that US$800 gold seems expensive. I would suggest the contrary: that a few years from now, sub-$1,000 gold will feel like a true gift."

Beginning in 2010, Kaplan has focused his investments in North America, including the acquisition of silver mining assets while waiting for long-stagnant prices to rebound.

Kaplan says his "mantra" is to "go for the great assets that give you tremendous underlying leverage to your theme... but only in jurisdictions that will allow you to keep the fruits of the leverage." Analysts have referred to his highlighting the importance of jurisdictional risks in the mining industry as the "Kaplan Doctrine".

=== Electrum Group ===
Since the sales of African Platinum and Leor, Kaplan has focused on the Electrum Group which holds interests in several publicly traded companies including NovaGold Resources. In May 2019, with gold then trading at $1,280 per ounce, Kaplan was quoted as saying: “I do believe gold embarks upon the next leg of its bull market and goes past $1,900 and ultimately, $3,000 to $5,000, if not a lot higher, depending on macro circumstances that today seem dim, but which I can’t really quantify.”

In August 2020, it was reported that Warren Buffett's Berkshire Hathaway had made an investment in Barrick Gold, NOVAGOLD's joint venture partner in the Donlin Gold mine project in Alaska.

The Electrum Group was formerly the controlling shareholder in the Los Gatos silver-zinc deposit in Mexico, which it developed in partnership with Dowa of Japan. Los Gatos Silver went public in October 2020, raising $170 million. In September 2024, Gatos Silver was acquired by First Majestic for $970 million.

In December 2020, with silver trading at $24 per ounce, he was quoted as saying the precious metal would hit “triple digits.”

The Electrum Group is the controlling shareholder of Sunshine Silver Mining & Refining Corporation, which owns the Sunshine Mine in Idaho, one of the largest and highest grade silver producers in U.S. history, as well as Sinda Ltd., an exploration-stage silver miner with operations in Guanajuato, Mexico.

In April 2025, together with fellow investor John Paulson, Kaplan's NOVAGOLD secured control of Donlin Gold, which is developing America's biggest gold mine in Alaska, by buying Barrick Mining's 50% interest in the project for $1 billion. In July 2026, NOVAGOLD acquired Paulson’s interests in Donlin Gold in an all-share transaction, creating a U.S.-based gold developer valued at US$4.2 billion.

In June 2026, Sunshine Silver Mining & Refining raised $270 million in an initial public offering on the New York Stock Exchange. The company has stated it plan to use IPO proceeds to fund feasibility studies and exploration to restart production.

That same month, Electrum-backed Sinda Ltd. raised $323 million in a NYSE IPO and concurrent private placement with Fresnillo, the world's largest silver producer..

== The Leiden Collection ==
Kaplan's passion for Dutch art began in his childhood with his first visit to the Metropolitan Museum of Art at the age of 6. Kaplan and his wife, Dafna Recanati Kaplan, began to collect the art of the Dutch Golden Age in 2003. In that year, they acquired their first Dutch painting: Gerrit Dou's Portrait of Dirck van Beresteyn. For the next five years, they acquired artwork at an average rate of nearly a painting a week.

The Leiden Collection, named after the Dutch town of Leiden where Rembrandt and Dou were born, is among the largest private collections of Dutch art in the world, with more than 220 paintings and drawings. The Kaplans' intention was to establish a "lending library for old masters", including loans for special exhibitions as well as loans to bolster long-term installations. It is estimated that these loans encompass over 40 museums worldwide.

The collection, which includes Rembrandt's Self-Portrait with Shaded Eyes and Minerva in Her Study, was featured in a three-part documentary entitled "Looking for Rembrandt" that aired on the BBC in April 2019 on the 350th anniversary of Rembrandt's death.

The Leiden Collection focuses on Rembrandt and his school with paintings and drawings, mainly by 17th-century artists based in Leiden. It includes 18 paintings by Rembrandt as well as the sole privately-held works remaining by Johannes Vermeer, Young Woman Seated at a Virginal (ca.1670–75), and Rembrandt’s most celebrated pupil, Carel Fabritius, Hagar and the Angel (ca. 1645).

The collection also includes paintings by members of Rembrandt's circle including his teacher, Pieter Lastman, as well as works by Jan Lievens and 13 paintings spanning the career of Gerrit Dou, Rembrandt's first pupil. A catalog of the Dou works in the collection, with technical analyses, appeared in 2014. In 2017, an online catalog of the collection was published under the supervision of Arthur K. Wheelock, Jr., the former Curator of Northern Baroque Paintings at the National Gallery of Art in Washington, DC. The digital catalog includes information on more than 175 of the works and features a preface, authored by Kaplan, describing the origins and evolution of The Leiden Collection.

In March 2026, The Leiden Collection acquired Man With a Plumed Red Beret (1654) by one of Rembrandt’s pupils, Willem Drost. The piece was once stolen by the Nazis and later owned by the Rothschild and Safra banking dynasties. In September 2026, The Leiden Collection acquired its eighteenth Rembrandt painting, Saint John on Patmos, depicting the artist’s son, Titus, as the exiled evangelist.

=== The Five Senses by Rembrandt van Rijn ===
At a 2015 auction in Bloomfield, New Jersey, a European bidder bought The Fainting Patient or Smell for $870,000, though its pre-auction estimate had only been $800. This was identified as an early work by Rembrandt, dating to 1624 and belonging to his The Five Senses series. Soon after, the Leiden Collection acquired the work for $5 million. The Leiden Collection owned Hearing and Touch from the series (Sight is in the Museum De Lakenhal in Leiden and the whereabouts of Taste is unknown).

Smell bears Rembrandt's monogram (RF or RHF, Rembrandt Harmensz. fecit), representing the master's earliest known signature, and is similar in dimensions and style to the other known works in the series. The three Leiden Collection works were exhibited at the Getty Museum in 2016, and the complete extant set of four were reunited for shows at the Ashmolean Museum and Rembrandthuis in 2017.

=== Notable works ===
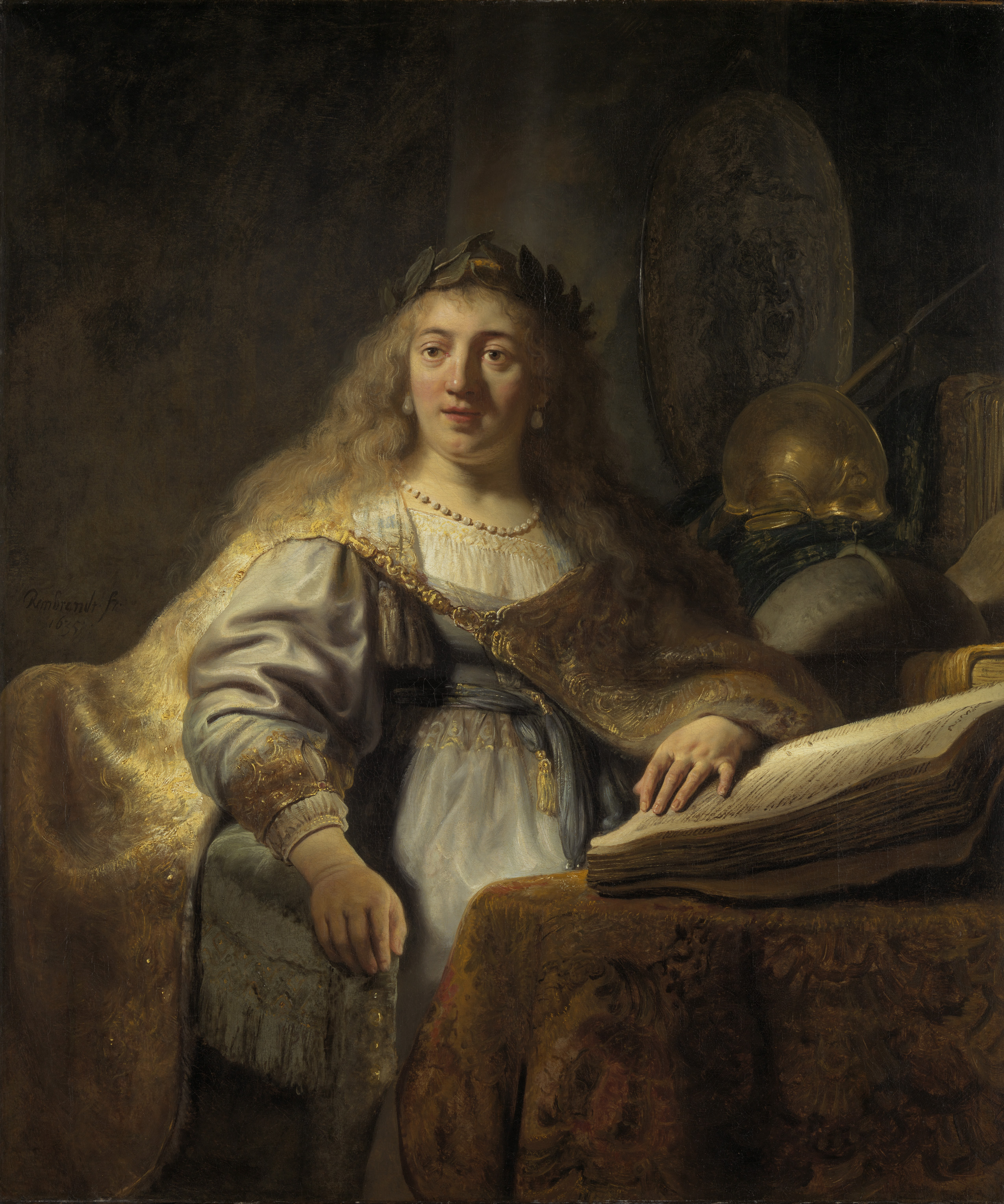
Minerva in Her Study, 1635, by Rembrandt van Rijn

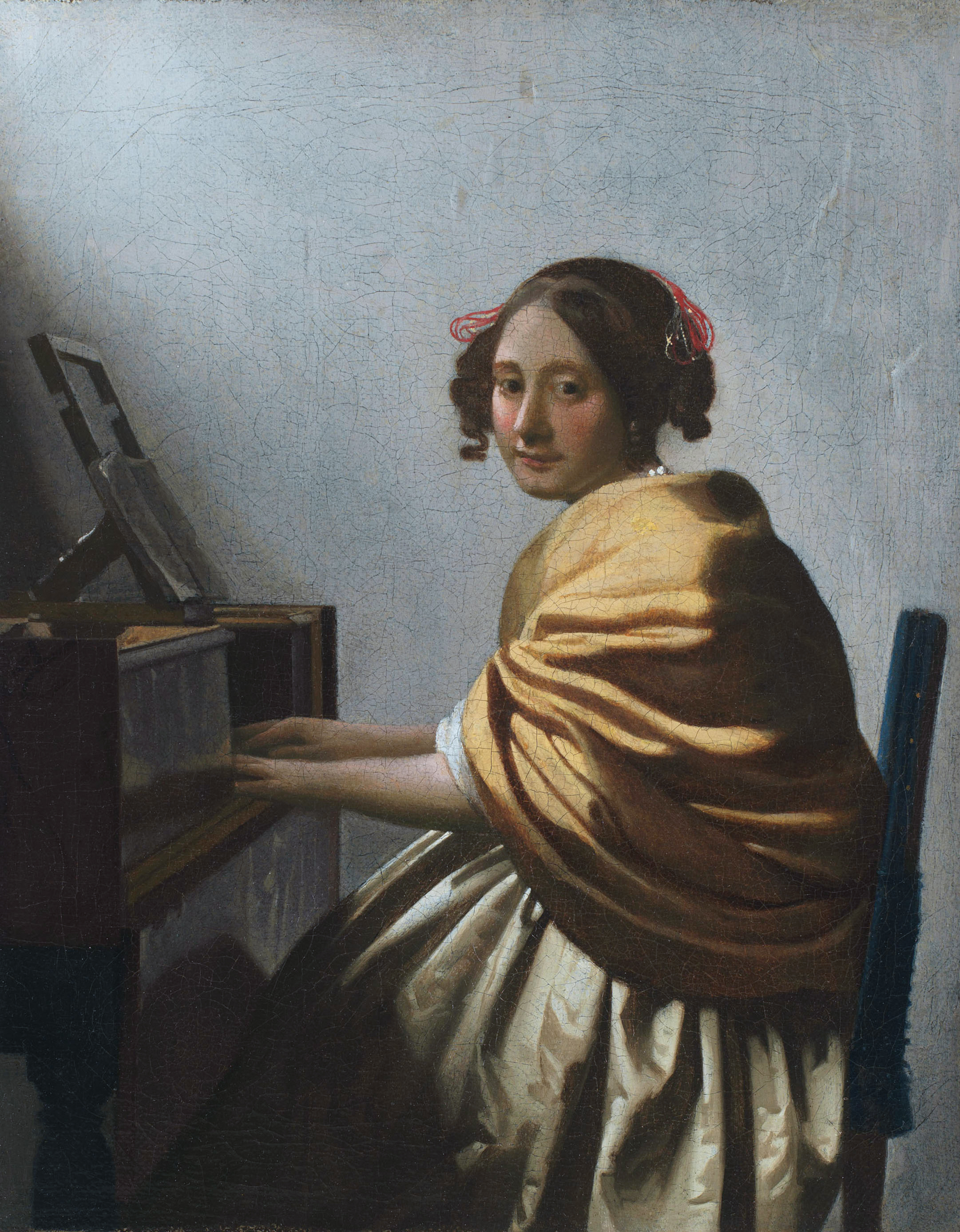
Johannes Vermeer, A Young Woman Seated at the Virginals, 1670-1672

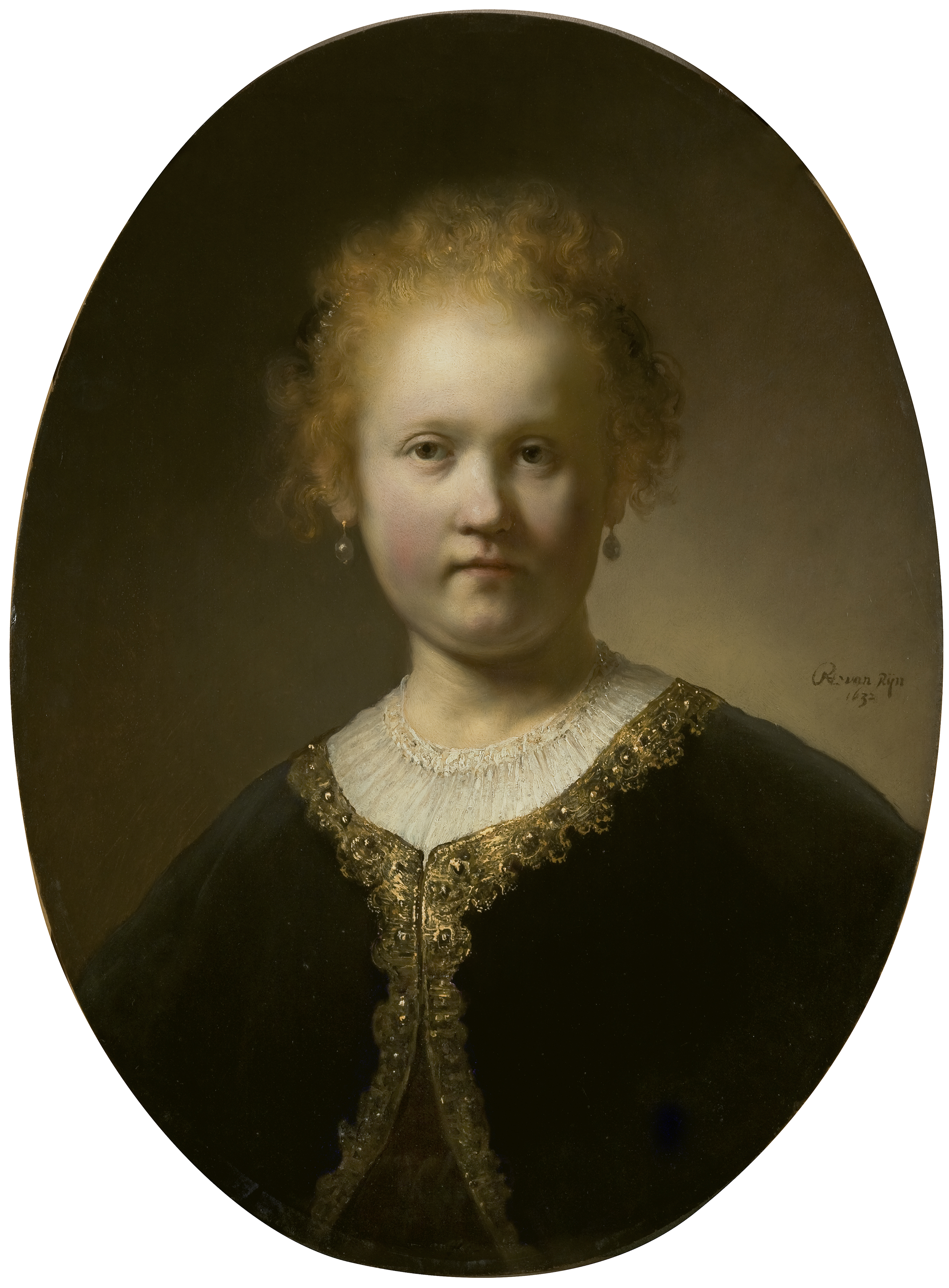
Young Girl in a Gold-Trimmed Cloak, 1632 by Rembrandt van Rijn

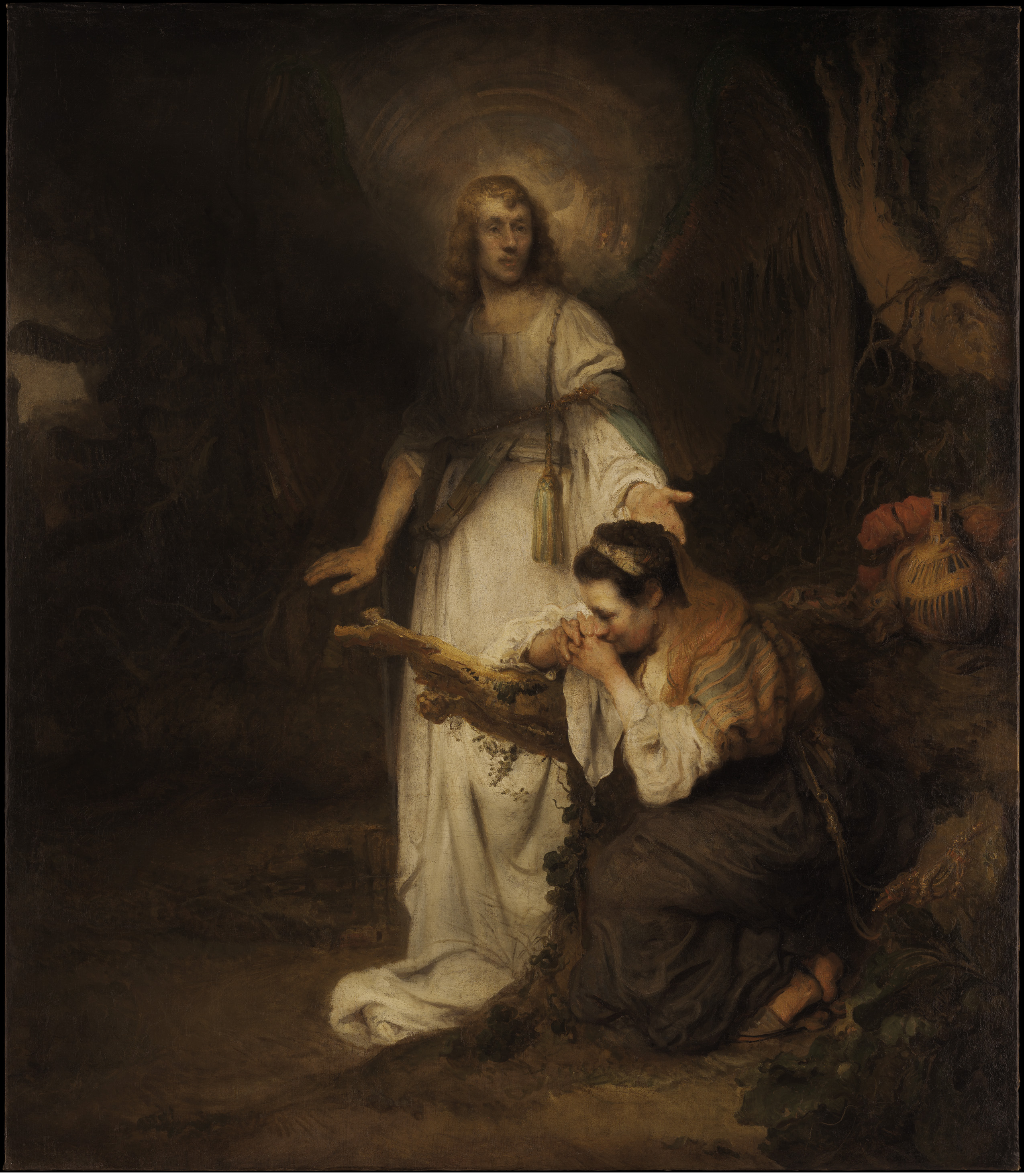
Hagar and the Angel, 1645 by Carel Fabritius

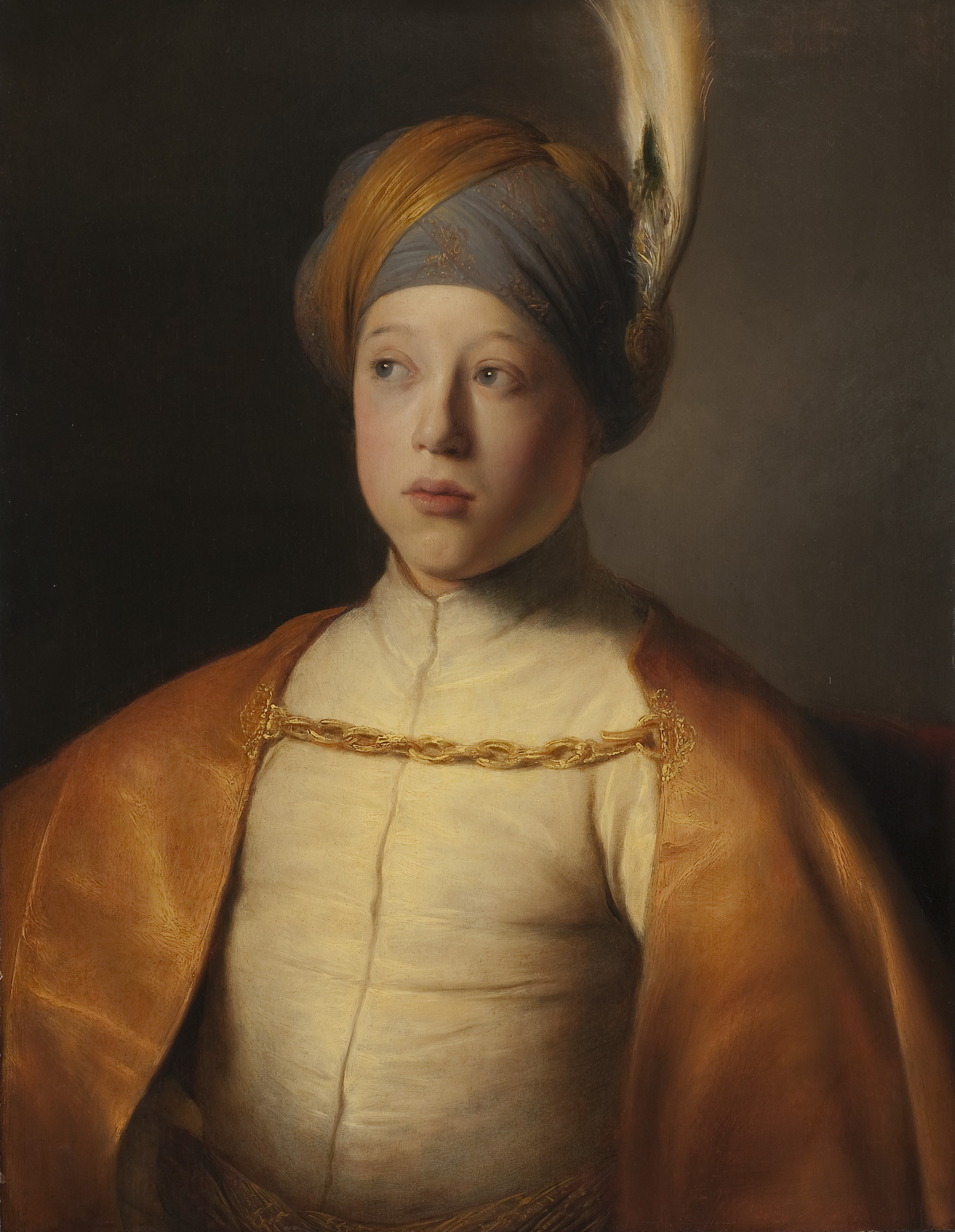
Boy in a Cape and Turban (Portrait of Prince Rupert of the Palatinate), 1631 by Jan Lievens

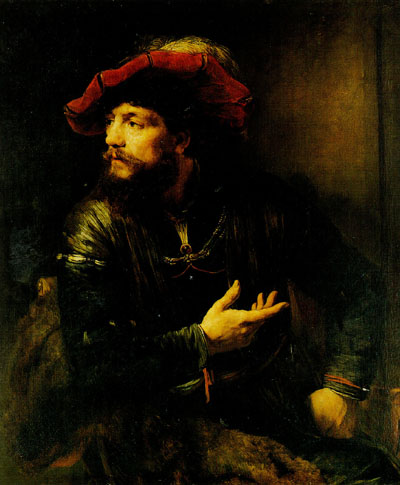
Portrait of an Officer in a Red Beret, 1654 by Willem Drost

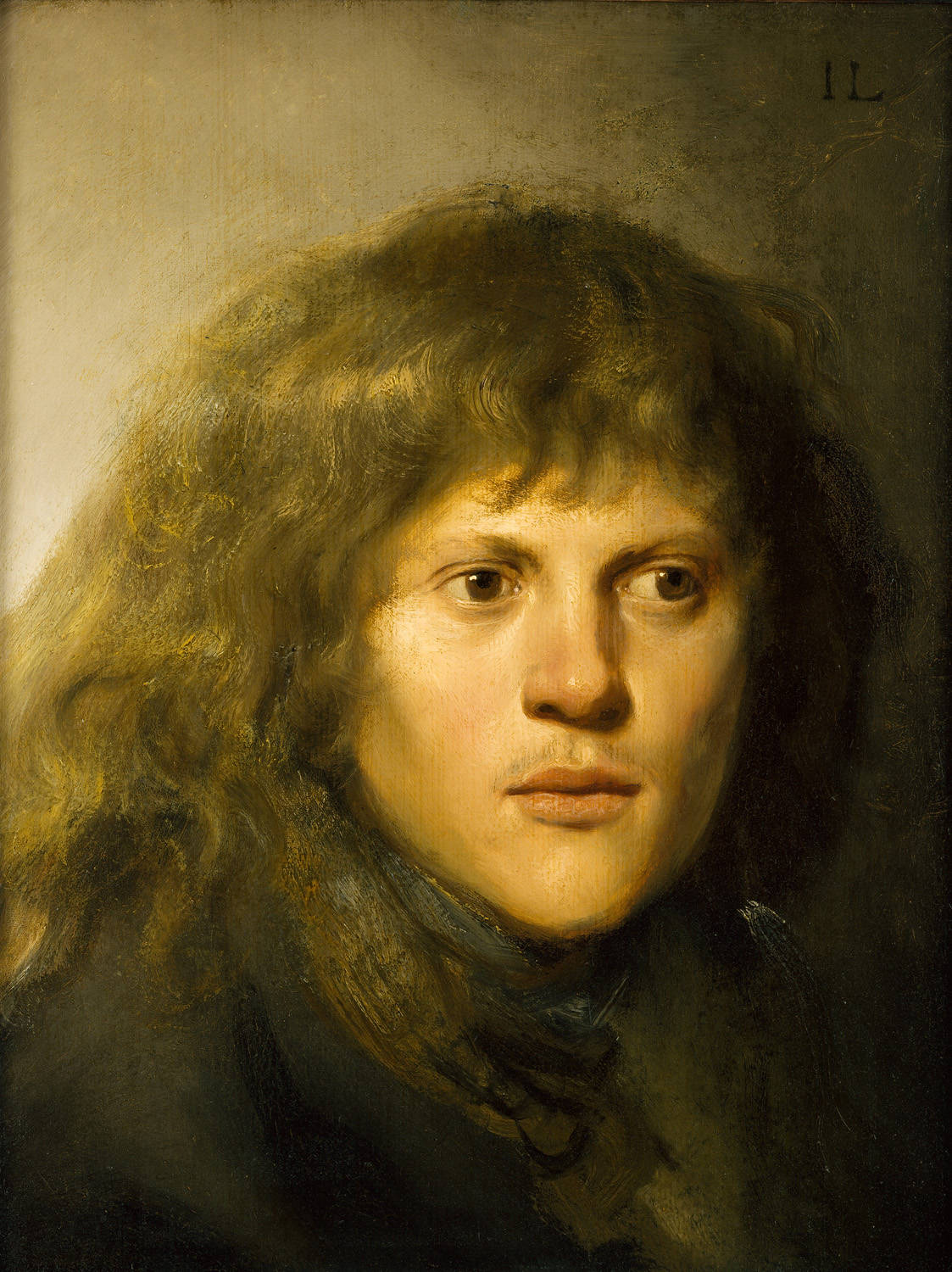
Self-portrait of Jan Lievens, circa 1629-1630

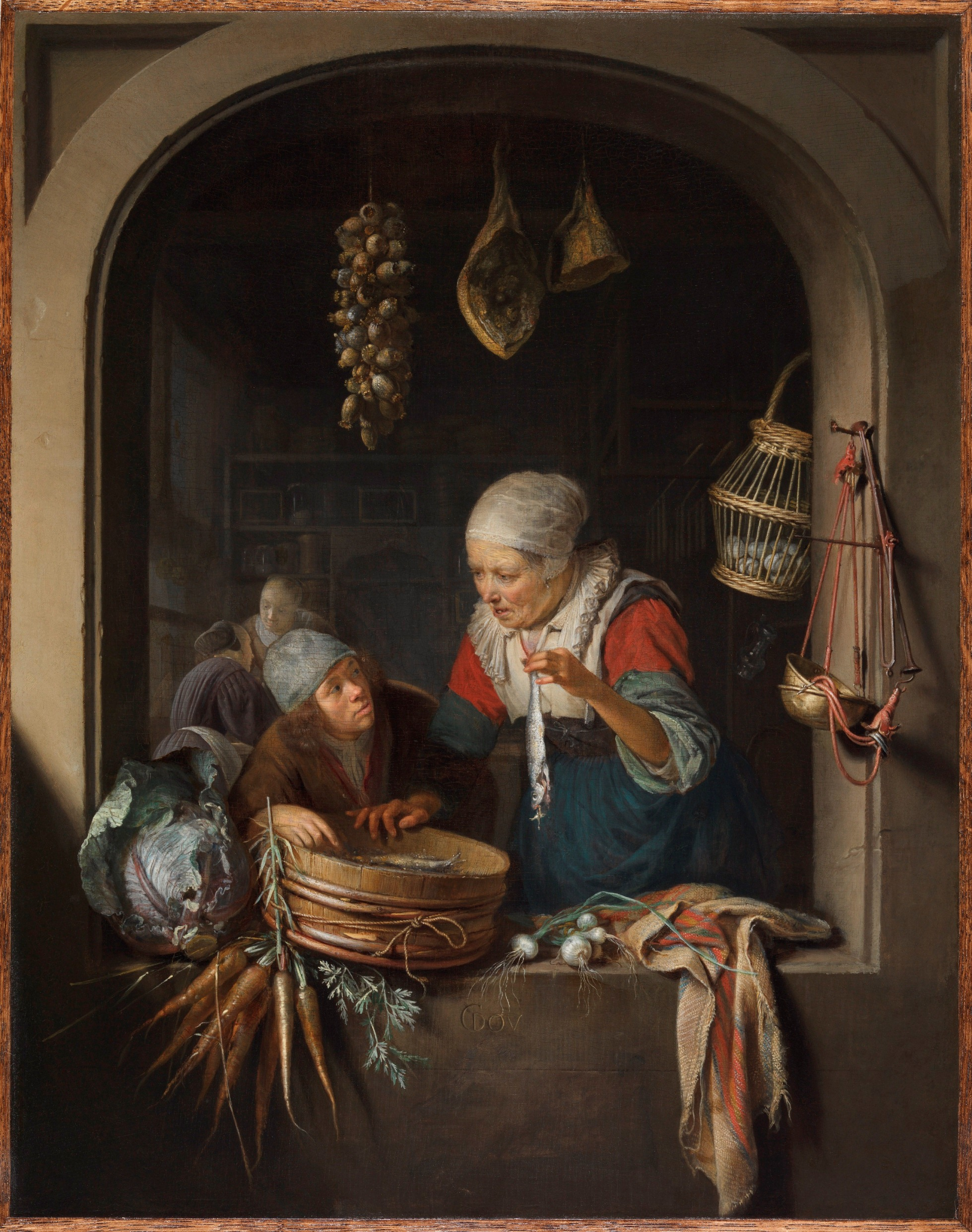
Gerrit Dou, The Herring Seller with a Young Boy

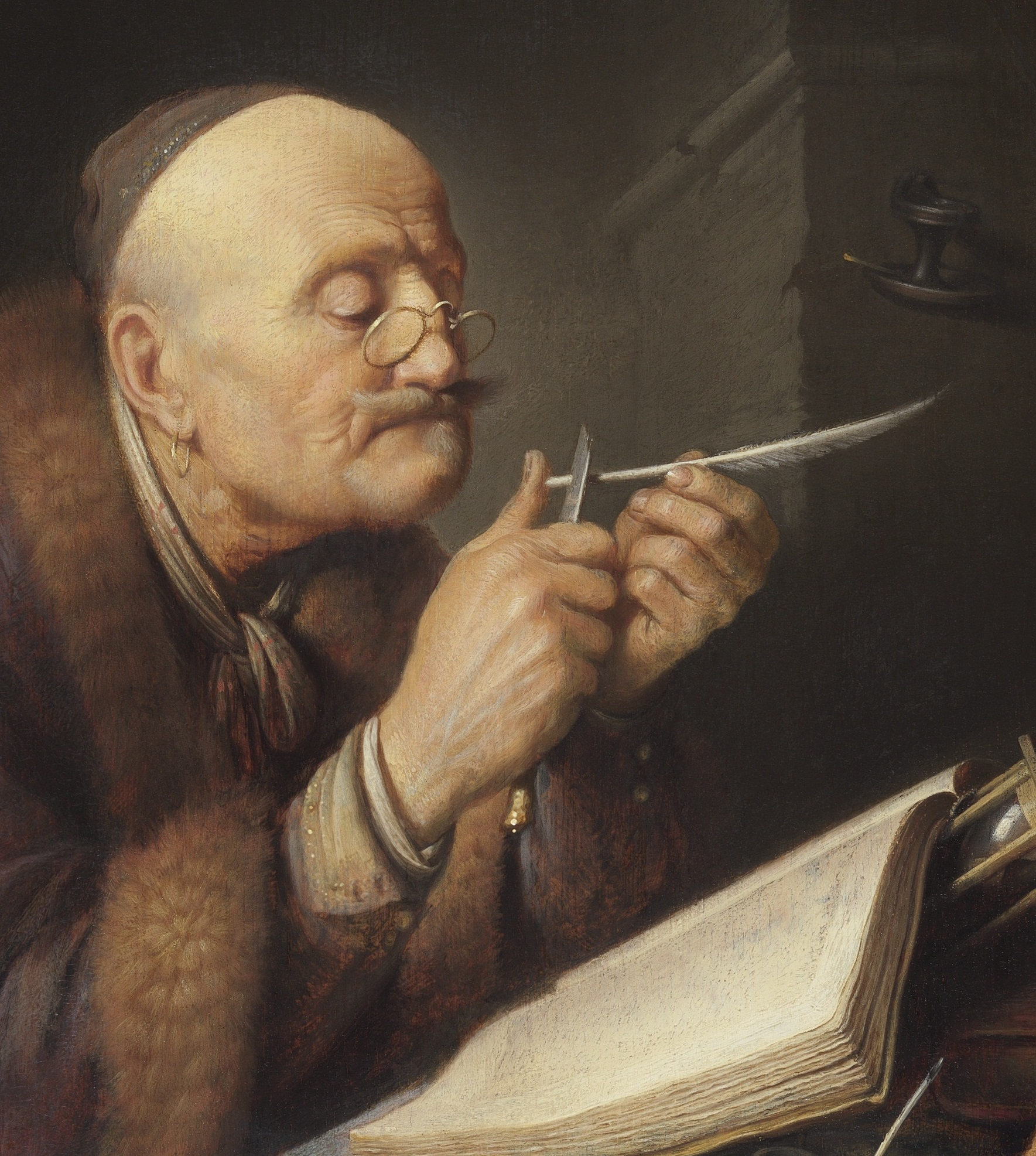
Gerrit Dou, Scholar Cutting his Pen

Portrait of a Man in a Red Coat by Rembrandt van Rijn, 1633

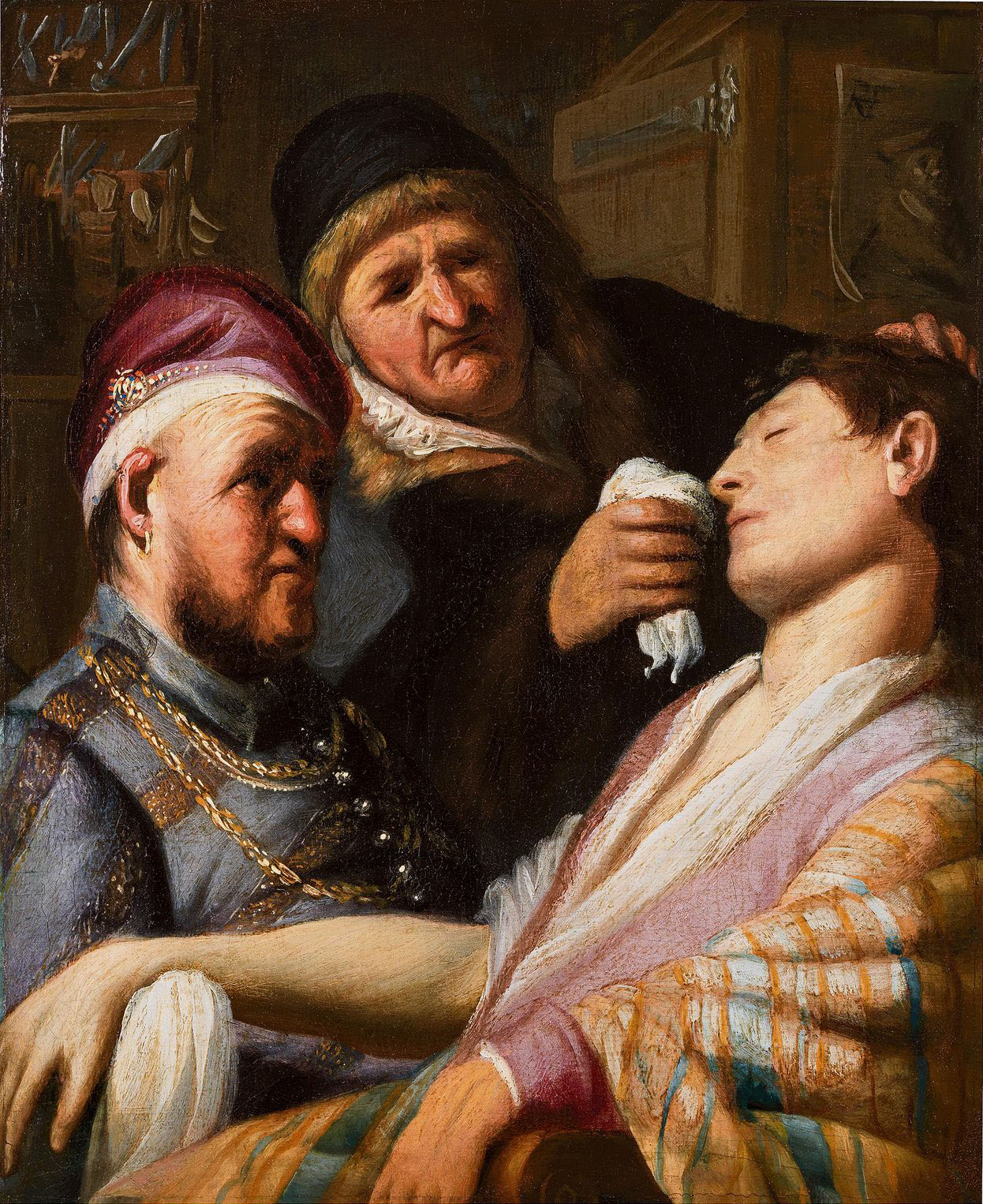
Smell by Rembrandt van Rijn (±1624), oil on panel

=== Exhibitions ===
Notable past and upcoming exhibitions of the Leiden Collection include:

- October 25, 2025 – March 29, 2026, Art and Life in Rembrandt's Time: Masterpieces from The Leiden Collection, Norton Museum of Art, West Palm Beach, Florida
- April 9, 2025 – August 24, 2025, From Rembrandt to Vermeer: Masterpieces from The Leiden Collection. H'ART Museum, Amsterdam
- February 4, 2023 – August 27, 2023, Rembrandt & His Contemporaries. History Paintings from the Leiden Collection, H'ART Museum, Amsterdam
- February 14, 2019 – May 18, 2019, Rembrandt, Vermeer and the Dutch Golden Age. Masterpieces from The Leiden Collection and the Musée du Louvre, Louvre Abu Dhabi, Abu Dhabi
- September 5, 2018 – January 13, 2019, The Age of Rembrandt and Vermeer: Masterpieces of The Leiden Collection, The State Hermitage Museum, Saint Petersburg
- March 28, 2018 – July 22, 2018, The Age of Rembrandt and Vermeer: Masterpieces of The Leiden Collection, Pushkin State Museum of Fine Arts, Moscow
- September 23, 2017 – February 25, 2018, Rembrandt, Vermeer and Hals in the Dutch Golden Age: Masterpieces from The Leiden Collection, Long Museum West Bund, Shanghai
- June 17, 2017 – September 3, 2017, Rembrandt and His Time: Masterpieces from The Leiden Collection, National Museum of China, Beijing
- February 22, 2017 – May 22, 2017, Le siècle de Rembrandt, Louvre, Paris
- March 11, 2014 – August 31, 2014, Gerrit Dou. The Leiden Collection from New York, Museum De Lakenhal, Leiden

== Philanthropy and activism ==
=== Foreign policy ===
Kaplan is a member of the Council on Foreign Relations. He belongs to the International Council of the Belfer Center for Science and International Affairs at Harvard University, where Kaplan, scholar Graham Allison and American General David Petraeus created the Recanati–Kaplan Foundation Fellows Program for intelligence officers from around the globe. A similar program was established in 2020 at the Yale Jackson School of Global Affairs, the Petraeus-Recanati-Kaplan Fellowship, which brings select special military operators to Yale University for a one-year global affairs master's. In 2022, the Recanati-Kaplan Applied History Initiative was created at the Cambridge Middle East and North Africa Forum, a think-tank based at the University of Cambridge, "to inform Middle East policy with deep historical insight".

In 2018, along with French philosopher and activist Bernard-Henri Lévy, Kaplan co-founded Justice for Kurds (JFK), a New York-based, not-for-profit advocacy group that seeks to educate and raise public awareness about the Kurdish cause in the U.S. and globally. Kaplan serves as chairman of the group. JFK's Advisory Council features policymakers, journalists, intellectuals, diplomats, military commanders, and artists.

While an affirmed "Persophile" who often and publicly recalls the merits of Iran's civilization, Kaplan is regularly targeted by official Iranian media for his opposition to the regime. Along with Sheldon and Miriam Adelson, Kaplan contributed three-quarters of the 1.7 million dollar revenue of United Against Nuclear Iran (UANI) in 2013. The following year, Kaplan was drawn into a defamation case in which UANI was sued by a Greek businessman whom the group claimed was doing business with Iran. The civil suit was later dismissed after the intervention of the Obama Administration which claimed "that the case could jeopardize U.S. national security by revealing state secrets."

In 2017 Kaplan gave a speech at a UANI conference in which he compared Iran's activities in Iraq to a reticulated python devouring a goat as well as saying that the Iranian government because of their Shiite Muslim beliefs "pursue a strategy of 'taqiyya', or religious dissimulation" to conceal its imperial aims. In response to the speech, in October 2017, the Persian Wildlife Heritage Foundation (PWHF), a conservation organization based in Iran, severed ties with the Kaplan-founded NGO, Panthera. In a letter to Panthera PWHF said, "His allegations about our country are absolutely baseless and his statements are insulting to our country and its people," the letter continued. "We are very sorry to see personal politics have a negative impact on conservation, but these are unusual times." The activists ended up getting arrested by the Iranian government under charges of treason, though they have maintained their innocence since.

In October of 2024, to mark the one year anniversary of the October 7 massacre by Hamas, Kaplan published an editorial in The Wall Street Journal arguing that Iran's "ideological fetish" for destroying Israel could lead to "the most catastrophic war in history".

In April 2025, seeking to provide an off-ramp to a potential war between Israel and Iran, Kaplan co-authored an editorial with John Kerry calling on Iran to roll back its nuclear program, ballistic-missile program, and proxy activities in the Middle East in exchange for sanctions relief with the United States and a peace agreement. The piece prompted a strong rebuke from the official Iranian media Kayhan.

In August 2025, Kaplan published a series of essays in the French literary and political review La Règle du Jeu. The pieces analyzed the outcomes of the Twelve-Day War and its implications for the future of the regime in Iran.

=== Community, culture, and antiquities ===
Kaplan served as president (2009–2012) and chairman of the board of directors (2012–2015) of the 92nd Street Y, a prominent Jewish community and cultural center in New York City. His wife Dafna and Robert Gilson conceived of the Recanati–Kaplan Program for Excellence in the Arts, which funds scholarships based on artistic merit for children and teens to study at the 92Y's School of the Arts. In Florida, where Kaplan grew up, he and his wife funded the Lillian Jean Kaplan Renal Transplantation Center at the University of Miami, as well as prizes and grants for renal science research focused on polycystic kidney disease (PKD).

In 2014, along with the Florence Gould Foundation, the Kaplans helped fund the creation of Albertine, a bookshop housed in the historic Payne Whitney House of the French Embassy on Fifth Avenue in New York City. Albertine has the largest collection of French-language books and English translations in the U.S. In 2022, Villa Albertine, a French government-sponsored residency program for artists and intellectuals in the U.S., launched the Recanati-Kaplan Prize to "support artistic and intellectual exchange between the United States, France, and the Arab world". The prize awards one recognized individual from the Arab world with a residency project in the U.S.

In 2015, after the passing of his boyhood friend, Simon Marsh, Kaplan parted with the two Spitfire Mark I fighter planes that he and Marsh had as partners restored with Historic Flying of Duxford, Cambridgeshire. The second of the planes, Spitfire N3200, was gifted in the presence of Prince William, the then Duke of Cambridge, to the Imperial War Museum at Duxford, where it had last flown as the personal aircraft of the Commander of 19 Squadron, Geoffrey Dalton Stephenson, later personal pilot to King George VI. The first, Spitfire P9374, flown by Captain Peter Cazenove over Dunkirk, was sold at auction at Christies London, where it achieved a record price for any Spitfire at auction, the proceeds of which were donated for the benefit of the RAF Benevolent Society, Panthera, Oxford's WildCRU and Stop Ivory.

In 2017, Kaplan became the chairman of the International Alliance for the Protection of Heritage in Conflict Areas (ALIPH), a Geneva-based foundation dedicated to the implementation of preventive, emergency response, and restoration programs for cultural property in danger of destruction, damage or looting. At the time of his retirement as Chairman, ALIPH’s activities encompassed 640 projects in 65 countries including Mali, Libya, Lebanon, Iraq, and Ukraine.

On October 29, 2019, at a ceremony in New York in which Princess Dana Firas of Jordan received the 2019 Watch Award, the World Monuments Fund bestowed upon Kaplan the Hadrian Award, a recognition established in 1988 to honor international leaders who have advanced the preservation of world art and architecture.

=== Conservation ===
Dubbed the "King of Cats", by Forbes Magazine, Kaplan was for 15 years the executive chairman of Panthera Corporation, a charity which he and his wife co-founded with Alan Rabinowitz in 2006. Panthera is devoted to preserving the big cats and their ecosystems and has been recognized as a leading force in felid conservation. The work of the organization has been called a "Manhattan Project" for big cats by reporter Bob Simon of 60 Minutes.

Conservationist Doug Tompkins has referred to Panthera as "the foremost big cat conservation organization in the world", with National Geographic saying Panthera "represents the most comprehensive effort of its kind in wildcat conservation." For his work as an environmentalist, Kaplan was the recipient of the "Hero of the Year Award" by the IWFF in 2012. In an interview with David Rubenstein, part of Bloomberg's "Peer-to-Peer Conversations" series, Kaplan said, "If I have one passion, which is even greater than Rembrandt, it would be wildlife conservation..." In an interview with Sotheby's, Kaplan connected his two passions: "I see the common denominator between the power of a Rembrandt and the power of when you first encounter a tiger in the wild. It's beauty."

Kaplan and his wife Dafna helped establish a felid conservation program at Oxford University in collaboration with David MacDonald. In 2009, the couple endowed the Recanati-Kaplan Center at Oxford University's Wildlife Conservation Research Unit, the WildCRU, and the university's Postgraduate Diploma in International Wildlife Conservation Practice, which offers young conservationists from developing countries access to training at Oxford. In February 2012, Oxford's WildCRU was awarded the Queen's Anniversary Prize for Higher Education in recognition of WildCRU's outstanding work in wildlife and environmental conservation. In July 2015, a trophy hunter killed Cecil the lion, who was being studied by the WildCRU's Kaplan-funded Hwange Lion Research Project in Zimbabwe.

The Kaplans also founded the Orianne Society, focused on the conservation of the eastern indigo snake and its habitat, the last remaining long-leaf pine forests of the Southeastern United States. As part of this effort, the Kaplans created the Orianne Indigo Snake Preserve in Georgia through the purchase and donation of 2,500 acres of the snake's winter habitat. In recognition for their work in wildlife conservation, in 2014 the Kaplans were awarded the New Species Award, and the naming of the newly discovered Orianne's Tree Snake, by the African Rainforest Conservancy.

On November 12, 2018, at the inaugural Paris Peace Forum, Kaplan launched the Indian Ocean Tortoise Alliance (IOTA), a Seychelles-based initiative dedicated to the conservation of the Aldabra tortoise and its rewilding in the other countries where it previously existed.

In 2020, Panthera launched a campaign called "Leopard Spotted" to encourage wearers of leopard print to promote awareness of the animal's plight on social media and donate to conservation efforts via a royalties system. Kaplan told The New Yorker, "We're not interested in discouraging people from using leopard print. To the contrary, what we want to do is make people understand that, while celebrating the leopard, they can also give back. If royalties were paid for any fashion statement like this, there would be more than enough money to save the leopard."

In February 2026, to celebrate the 20th anniversary of the founding of Panthera, Kaplan and co-owner, Panthera Chairman, Jon Ayers, sold the drawing Young Lion Resting by Rembrandt for $17.8m with the proceeds going to benefit the organization. The Sotheby's auction shattered the record for the most expensive drawing by the 17th-century Dutch painter previously set at $3.7m for The Bulwark De Rose and the Windmill De Smeerpot.

In June 2026, Kaplan pledged £4 million to his alma mater, Pembroke College, to establish The Recanati-Kaplan Minerva Institute. The program will address global challenges at the intersection of environmental conservation and security. The institute will enhance multi-disciplinary collaboration between the Wildlife Conservation Research Unit (WildCRU) and Oxford's Changing Character of War: Strategy, Statecraft, and Technology Centre (CCW-SST).

== Distinctions ==
In March 2014, Kaplan was awarded the rank of Chevalier in the Ordre national de la Légion d'honneur of France, the country's highest civilian distinction. In presenting the decoration, the French Ambassador to the United States, François Delattre, said of Kaplan: "Through your multifaceted life and your support for an incredible array of causes, I believe you are the very definition of a game changer and Renaissance man - a young Renaissance man: as Chairman of the Y, as an environmentalist in Brazil, as an entrepreneur, a historian, a philanthropist, an art collector and a politically engaged individual." He was later promoted to the rank of Officier.

In March 2017, Kaplan was decorated as a Commandeur in the Ordre des Arts et des Lettres by France's Minister of Culture, Audrey Azoulay, at a ceremony at the Louvre Museum. The award was given in recognition of the Kaplan family's contribution to the arts in France as well as globally.

In September 2018, Kaplan was awarded the rank of Officer in the Order of Orange-Nassau for his efforts in disseminating Dutch culture and building bridges between people through art. Renée Jones-Bos, Ambassador of the Netherlands to Russia, presented the distinction to Kaplan in the Saint Petersburg office of Mikhail Piotrovsky, Director of the Hermitage Museum.

== Personal life ==
Kaplan is married to Dafna Recanati Kaplan, daughter of Israeli artist Mira Recanati and investor Leon Recanati. They have three children.
