= San Cristóbal mine (Bolivia) =

Mine in Lipez, Potosí, Bolivia

Coordinates: 21.0937°S 67.2090°W

San Cristobal Mine
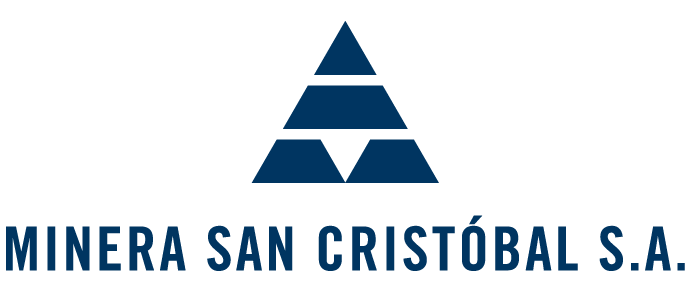
- Minera San Cristóbal Logo
- Native name: Minera San Cristóbal S.A.
- Industry: Mining
- Founded: (2000)
- Headquarters: Nor Lipez, Potosí, Bolivia
- Key people: Quinton Todd Hennigh (President); David Tretbar (Vice-President); Christopher McGoldrick (Secretary); Ronan Sabo-Walsh (Alternate); Fernando Aguirre B., (Incumbent Shareholder’s Advocate); Ignacio Aguirre, (Alternate Shareholder’s Advocate); Christopher McGoldrick, (Executive President of Minera San Cristóbal S.A.)
- Products: Silver, lead and zinc
- Number of employees: 1,400
- Parent: San Cristobal Mining Inc
- Website: www.minerasancristobal.com/v3/en

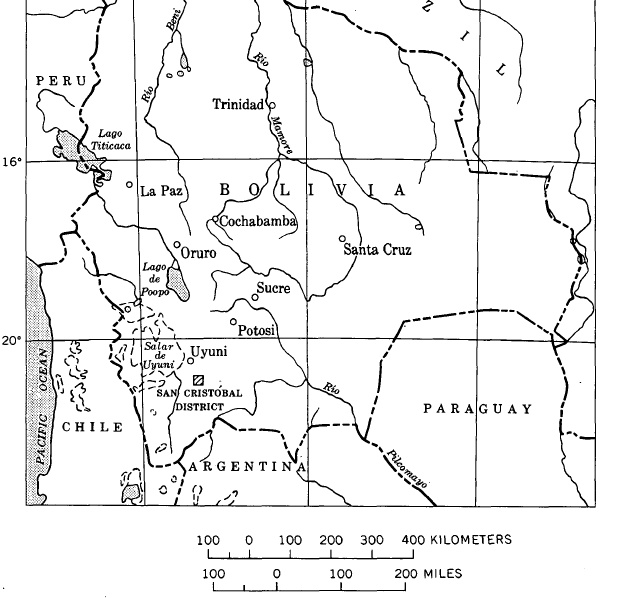
Map showing the location of the San Cristobal District

== Overview ==
Minera San Cristóbal S.A. is a mining company located in Nor Lípez Province, in the municipality of Colcha K, Department of Potosí, Bolivia.

The San Cristóbal mine is one of the largest zinc, lead and silver deposits in the world. Its mineralization is low grade but high volume, which is why the operation uses an open-pit mining method. The operation is focused on the production of zinc-silver and lead-silver concentrates. Minera San Cristóbal is a subsidiary of the Canadian mining company San Cristóbal Mining Inc.

== History ==
Geologic Map of the San Cristobal mining area

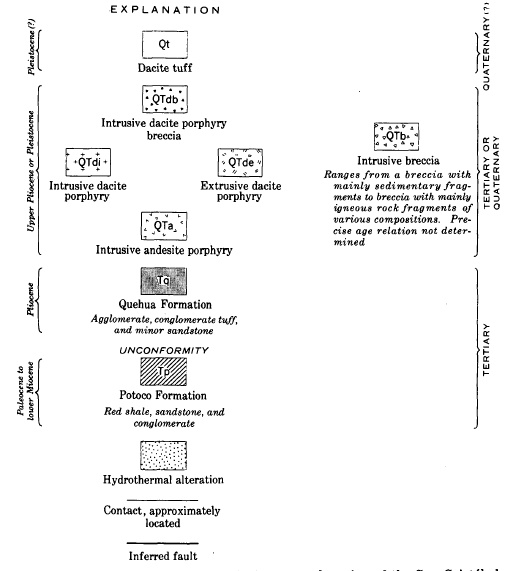
Legend to the geologic map

In 1994, Andean Silver Corporation, Andean American Gold and its subsidiary ASC Bolivia LDC were established to develop mining projects in South America. Through an alliance with MINTEC, a leading Bolivian consulting firm in the mining sector, the company obtained an option to purchase concessions from the San Cristóbal and Toldos groups.

Initial drilling activities began in August 1996, when Apex Silver Mines was created to acquire and develop silver, zinc and lead mining projects worldwide.

In February 2000, Minera San Cristóbal S.A. was incorporated, and ASC Bolivia LDC transferred all of its mining concessions in the San Cristóbal district to the new company. The company launched a program to build and refurbish mining camps, with significant investments in machinery and equipment.

Between 2001 and 2004, work that had begun in 2000 was halted due to low mineral prices in global markets and the lack of a solution for the power supply. However, in line with its corporate social responsibility policy, MSC continued to support projects benefiting neighboring communities in collaboration with institutions such as the Andean Development Corporation, now CAF – Development Bank of Latin America and the Caribbean. These initiatives included roads, drinking water systems, sewerage and tourism development, among others.

Between 2004 and 2006, construction began on the project’s infrastructure, processing plant and mine preparation works. Due to their scale, these activities represented a significant contribution to the Bolivian economy and served as a driver for development in one of the country’s poorest regions. More than 40 contractors participated in these projects.

In 2005, the final design of the railway line was completed, and MSC was granted the environmental license for the railway.

In 2006, Sumitomo Corporation acquired a 35% stake in MSC from the majority shareholder, Apex Silver Mines Ltd.

In 2007, engineering work was completed, allowing mining operations to begin gradually. The processing plant started operating while the company tested equipment and systems. The first concentrate exports were also carried out.

In 2008, the operation reached its design production targets. Some design modifications were required in the production process to improve the efficiency and quality of the concentrates.

In 2009, MSC operated at 100% of its design capacity. In March of that year, MSC became a wholly owned subsidiary of Sumitomo Corporation.

In 2018, Minera San Cristóbal became the first Bolivian mining company accepted as a member of the International Council on Mining and Metals. This membership reflected the company’s commitment to global principles of sustainable mining, business ethics, respect for human rights and environmental performance.

In 2023, San Cristóbal Mining Inc. completed the acquisition of Minera San Cristóbal S.A. and all associated assets from Sumitomo Corporation under the terms of a share purchase agreement. Through this transaction, the company acquired all issued and outstanding shares of Comercial Metales Blancos AB and SC Minerals Bolivia S.R.L., former Sumitomo subsidiaries that held all ownership interests in MSC.

== Investment ==
The San Cristóbal mining project is one of the largest mining investments in Bolivia, with an approximate investment of US$1.8 billion. These resources were allocated to exploration, feasibility studies, environmental studies, project engineering, mine preparation, plant construction, supporting infrastructure and working capital.

In terms of infrastructure, more than 200 kilometers of roads and bridges, as well as a 65-kilometer railway branch line, have contributed to connecting local communities with the region, the Department of Potosí and the rest of the country.

In basic services, Minera San Cristóbal built a 172-kilometer power transmission line, supported the development of designs and studies for water collection and treatment systems, and helped install potable water connections in several communities.

In 2024, the company paid US$327.6 million to the Bolivian State in taxes, royalties and mining fees.

== Mineralization ==
The San Cristóbal deposit is characterized by mineralization found in veins, veinlets and disseminations which, together, form a low-grade mineral deposit. Despite its size, the deposit cannot be efficiently mined using traditional underground mining methods, which is why an open-pit operation is used.

Since its acquisition by San Cristóbal Mining Inc. in 2023, the company has begun a new evaluation process to update and expand reserve and resource estimates as part of its strategy to position itself among the world’s leading silver producers. These updated estimates are expected to incorporate recent geological, metallurgical and exploration data, and may reflect changes in the mine’s projected life, production potential and future expansion opportunities.

== Operations ==
The main characteristic of the San Cristóbal deposit is mineralization in the form of thin veins, veinlets and disseminations that together form a low-grade ore body. The operation uses an open-pit mining method, which allows the movement of large volumes of material using modern heavy equipment specifically designed for this type of mining activity.

The Operations Management division oversees the entire operation, including general planning, grid layout of the area to be mined, drilling of blast holes, coordination of laboratory analysis of samples from new areas, delimitation of mineralized blocks, extraction and transportation of materials.

The company uses advanced techniques in sampling, laboratory analysis, geological mapping and topographic surveys to obtain accurate and reliable information about the mine.

Data and information from these studies are managed and analyzed using MineSight software, which serves as the basis for mine planning and operations. The software generates three-dimensional models of the mine reserves, mineralization types and access roads to the open pit. This enables more efficient mining operations while helping minimize environmental impacts.

The Mine Control Center, which uses modern software, is responsible for full visual and computerized control through GPS devices throughout the mining process, from extraction to transportation to the processing plant.

Ore extracted from the open pit is transported in 200-ton trucks to the crushing plant, while waste rock is transported and deposited in designated waste storage areas. Once crushed, the ore is transported by a 1.7-kilometer conveyor belt to the concentration plant.

== Production ==
In 2024, the company achieved 97.07% operational utilization, and 18.13 million tonnes of ore were processed by the SAG mill. Production reached 338,000 wet metric tonnes of zinc-silver concentrate and 103,000 wet metric tonnes of lead-silver concentrate.

Regarding concentrate logistics, MSC transported 27,134 containers and shipped 502,079 tonnes of concentrate through port facilities.

== Sustainable Development and Certifications ==
At Minera San Cristóbal, policies, values and strategic planning are focused on developing a mining model that includes responsible commitments in the economic, social and environmental areas. Sustainability is an essential and integral part of the company’s strategic objectives. Minera San Cristóbal holds several national and international certifications that support its standards in management, safety, quality and sustainability. These include:

- ISO 9001, for quality management of its processes.
- ISO 14001, for environmental management.
- ISO 45001, for occupational health and safety management, replacing the previous OHSAS 18001 certification.
- ISO 27001, for information security management.
- NB-ISO/IEC 17025, accreditation of its Chemical Laboratory for technical competence in chemical testing of export batches of zinc-silver and lead-silver concentrates.
- NB 512001, Healthy Company certification for good practices in workplace health promotion.

In aviation, the company holds:

- IS-BAO, for best practices in air operations.
- Approved Maintenance Organization Certificate, OMA No. 006, for the maintenance of MSC aircraft.

In logistics and foreign trade:

- The National Customs of Bolivia certified Minera San Cristóbal as an Authorized Economic Operator for imports and exports, recognizing its security standards in the logistics chain.

In Human Resources:

- Top Employer: Validation of good practices in Human Resources management.

== Community Relations ==
As part of its commitments to the community, a new town of San Cristóbal was built and its historic church was relocated. The new community includes improvements in infrastructure, and the population has access to electricity, water and basic sanitation services.

== Relocation of the Town ==
In 1998, negotiations began with the local population to relocate the town, which was located in an area near significant mineral deposits.

A Town Relocation Commission was created and traveled to the nearby cities of Quechisla, Tupiza and Uyuni to study their architectural styles and speak with community leaders about the relocation of the town and the church of San Cristóbal. The company presented a proposal to the population of San Cristóbal, which provided feedback and led to revisions.

On June 9, 1998, the Town Relocation Agreement was signed. The document was ratified by the Prefect of Potosí and the President of the Civic Committee of Potosí. It was also approved by the Vice Ministry of Mining, the municipal mayor and the municipal representative.

To ensure transparency, quality and efficiency, all construction work was supervised by an independent construction company. Community stakeholders participated in the planning and development process.

The new town of San Cristóbal was officially inaugurated in a special ceremony on June 9, 1999. The new community includes a hospital, a chapel, a school, a government house, sports and athletics fields, housing, roads and basic service facilities.

Shortly after the new town was populated, the mining rights were transferred to a new company: Minera San Cristóbal.

== Relocation of the Church ==
The colonial church of the Bolivian town of San Cristóbal was declared a National Monument in December 1967. Although there are no exact records of its construction date, it was already mentioned in chronicles from the 16th century.

In 1998, the company met with the San Cristóbal community to relocate the town to a safe distance from the area where mining operations were to begin. The company invested more than US$400,000 to ensure that the relocation was carried out safely and without incidents. The relocation followed international standards and local traditions for moving religious structures with due reverence and care. Local and regional religious leaders were consulted and contributed significantly to the church relocation process.

== Area of Influence ==
The direct area of influence of the mining operation includes four communities: San Cristóbal, Culpina K, Vila Vila and Río Grande. The indirect area of influence includes eight communities located along the main road between Uyuni and Abaroa, as well as the railway route used to transport materials, supplies and concentrates.

== Local Economic Development ==
In terms of local economic development, the company continues to cooperate through the Los Lípez San Cristóbal Advisory Council on several initiatives. These include the commercialization of llama meat products, the start-up of a quinoa processing plant and the promotion of local tourism.

The company has also supported the creation of the Alternative Education Center in San Cristóbal and the reaccreditation of the Río Grande Health Center. In addition, it has provided counterpart support to the municipalities of Colcha K and San Agustín to complete the paving of the Puente Río Grande–Cruce Laguna Colorada road.

== Environmental Management ==
MSC focuses its management system on the responsible, efficient and sustainable use of natural resources through the implementation of good environmental prevention and control practices in its activities. These practices are based on the company’s principles, management policy and regulatory compliance objectives.

In 2024, the company invested US$3,342,379 in environmental protection.

== Health and Safety ==
The prevention of accidents and occupational illnesses, together with the protection of the physical integrity of its employees, contractors and collaborators, is a central objective of Minera San Cristóbal. The company works to provide safe, healthy and adequate working conditions for its personnel and stakeholders.

Its focus on continuous improvement and operational excellence has contributed to MSC receiving recognitions related to its management practices and to being regarded as a reference for modern mining in Bolivia.

== Publicaciones ==
Publications issued by Minera San Cristóbal S.A.
| Publication | Document type | Year of publication | Standards |
|---|---|---|---|
| Sustainability Report 2015 - Shared Successes | Sustainability Report | 2016 | G4 Guidelines for Sustainability Reporting and the G4 Mining and Metals Sector Supplement of the Global Reporting Initiative |
| Sustainability Report 2016 - Shared Successes | Sustainability Report | 2017 | G4 Guidelines for Sustainability Reporting and the G4 Mining and Metals Sector Supplement of the Global Reporting Initiative |
| Sustainability Report 2017 – Building a future | Sustainability Report | 2019 | GRI G4 and Mining and Metals Sector Supplement |
| Sustainability Report 2018 – Building a future | Sustainability Report | 2019 | GRI G4 / applicable GRI Standards |
| Sustainability Report 2019 – Building a future | Sustainability Report | 2020 | According to the applicable GRI Standards |
| Sustainability Report 2020 – Building a future | Sustainability Report | 2021 | According to the updated GRI Standards |
| Sustainability Report 2021 – Overcoming Challenges | Sustainability Report | 2022 | GRI Standards and ICMM recommendations |
| Sustainability Report 2022 – Overcoming Challenges | Sustainability Report | 2023 | GRI Standards 2021 and ICMM assurance |
| Sustainability Report 2023 – Forging Opportunities | Sustainability Report | 2024 | GRI Standards 2021 and ICMM assurance |
| Sustainability Report 2024 - Forging Opportunities | Sustainability Report | 2025 | GRI Standards 2021 and ICMM assurance |
| Sustainability Report 2025 - The best is yet to come | Sustainability Report | 2026 | GRI Standards 2021 and ICMM assurance |
