= Leon Yehuda Recanati =

Ottoman-born businessman and Jewish community leader

- ליאון רקנאטי
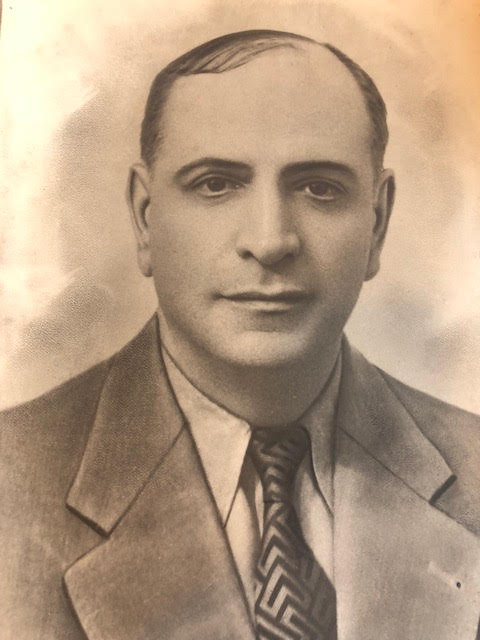
- Born: 1890; Salonica, Ottoman Empire
- Died: October 13, 1945 (aged 54–55); Tel Aviv, Mandatory Palestine
- Occupation: Businessman
- Spouse: Mathilda Saporta
- Children: 4 Raphael Recanati (son)
- Relatives: Leon Recanati (grandson) Michael Recanati (grandson)

Leon Yehuda Recanati (Hebrew: ליאון רקנאטי; 1890–1945) was an Ottoman-born businessman and Jewish community leader who became a prominent banker and philanthropist in Mandatory Palestine.

== Biography ==
Leon Yehuda Recanati was born in 1890 in Thessaloniki. He was a leader in Greece's Jewish community until he immigrated to Mandatory Palestine in 1935. In 1936, he was elected as the representative of the Greek Jewish community to the World Jewish Congress. Recanti's sons, Harry, Daniel, Raphael, and Jacques established the IDB Holding Corporation, one of the largest investment companies in Israel. His sons donated the Leon Recanati Business School at Tel Aviv University in his honor in 1966. In addition, they named the Salonika and Greece Jewry Heritage Center in his memory.

== Banking and public activism ==
In 1935, Recanati established the Palestine Discount Bank in Tel Aviv; the institution would later become Israel Discount Bank. In his later years, he became involved in philanthropic endeavors and served as a member of the executive committee of the Society of Friends of the Hebrew University and was the founder and chairman of Banim L'Gvulam, which encouraged the settlement of Sephardic Jews in Palestine. In 1985, Recanati was honored on an Israeli commemorative postage stamp.
