= Avraham Rakanti =

Greek-Israeli politician and journalist

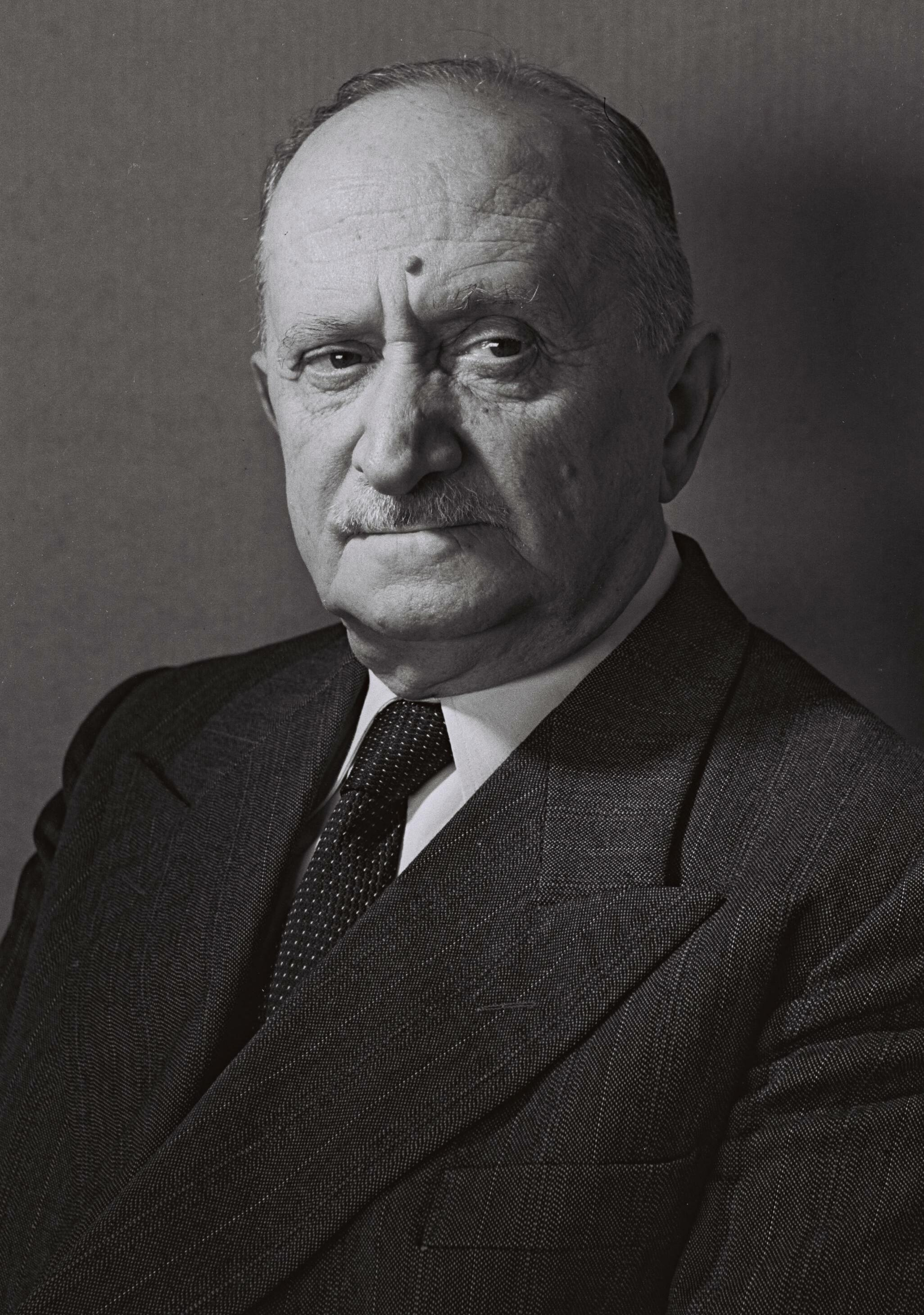
- Rakanti in 1956

Faction represented in the Knesset
- 1949–1951: Herut

Personal details
- Born: 1888 Salonica, Ottoman Empire
- Died: 3 March 1980 (aged 91–92)

Avraham Shmuel Rakanti (Hebrew: אברהם שמואל רקנאטי; 1888 – 3 March 1980) was a Greek-Israeli politician and journalist. In Greece he served as deputy mayor of Thessaloniki between 1925 and 1933, whilst in Israel he was a member of the Knesset for Herut between 1949 and 1951.

== Biography ==
Born in Salonica in the Ottoman Empire, Rakanti studied in a heder. He became a member of the Mizrachi association, and in 1925 he joined the Revisionist Zionism movement, becoming head of the Greek branch. In the same year he became deputy mayor of Thessaloniki, a position he held until 1933. He also founded and edited the French language newspaper, Pro-Yisrael. In 1934 he made aliyah to Mandatory Palestine. A member of the Revisionist Zionist central committee, he was elected to the first Knesset in 1949 on the Herut list, but lost his seat in the 1951 elections. He died on 3 March 1980. A street in the Ramot neighbourhood of Jerusalem is named after him.
