= List of medical organisations =

The following is a list of medical organizations:

== International and multinational ==
- Africa Centres for Disease Control and Prevention
- AMD Alliance International
- Asian Health Literacy Association
- European Centre for Disease Prevention and Control
- International College of Angiology
- International Federation of Associations of Pharmaceutical Physicians and Pharmaceutical Medicine
- International Federation of Otorhinolaryngological Societies
- International Committee of the Red Cross
- International Rhinologic Society
- International Society of Internal Medicine
- International Society of Pharmacoepidemiology
- International Society of Pharmacovigilance
- International Union of Basic and Clinical Pharmacology
- Medical Women's International Association
- Médecins Sans Frontières
- World Allergy Organization
- World Association of Societies of Pathology and Laboratory Medicine
- World Federation of Neurosurgical Societies
- World Health Organization
- World Medical Association

== Australia and New Zealand ==
- Australasian College for Emergency Medicine
- Australasian College of Dermatologists
- Australian Medical Association
- Australian and New Zealand College of Anaesthetists
- Doctors Reform Society of Australia
- National Prescribing Service
- Royal Australasian College of Physicians
- Royal Australasian College of Surgeons
- Royal Australian College of General Practitioners
- Royal Australian and New Zealand College of Psychiatrists
- Royal Australian and New Zealand College of Obstetricians and Gynaecologists
- Royal Australian and New Zealand College of Ophthalmologists
- Royal Australian and New Zealand College of Radiologists
- Royal College of Pathologists of Australasia

== Asia ==
=== Hong Kong ===
- Hong Kong College of Physicians

=== India ===
- Indian Orthopaedic Association
- Ibn Sina Academy of Medieval Medicine and Sciences
- Indian Academy of Pediatrics
- Academy of Family Physicians of India
- Indian Medical Association

=== Sri Lanka ===
- College of Community Physicians of Sri Lanka

== Africa ==
- South African Medical Association
- Nigerian Medical Association
- Seychelles Medical and Dental Council

== Europe ==
- Aid Access
- Cardiovascular and Interventional Radiological Society of Europe (CIRSE)
- European Academy of Allergy and Clinical Immunology (EAACI)
- European Renal Association - European Dialysis and Transplant Association (ERA-EDTA)
- European Society for Medical Oncology (ESMO)
- European Society of Cardiology (ESC)
- European Society of Radiology (ESR)

=== Denmark ===
- Danish Medical Association

=== Germany ===
- Association of the Scientific Medical Societies in Germany (AWMF)
- German Agency for Quality in Medicine
- German Medical Association
- German Network for Evidence Based Medicine
- Psychologie Verbund (PV)

=== Republic of Ireland ===
- Irish College of General Practitioners
- Irish College of Ophthalmologists
- Irish Medical Organisation
- Royal College of Physicians of Ireland
- Royal College of Surgeons in Ireland

=== Spain ===
- SEICAP

=== United Kingdom ===
- Association of Anaesthetists of Great Britain and Ireland
- British Geriatrics Society
- British International Doctors Association
- British Medical Association
- Royal College of Anaesthetists
- Royal College of Emergency Medicine
- Royal College of General Practitioners
- Royal College of Midwives
- Royal College of Nursing
- Royal College of Obstetricians and Gynaecologists
- Royal College of Ophthalmologists
- Royal College of Paediatrics and Child Health
- Royal College of Pathologists
- Royal College of Physicians
- Royal College of Physicians of Edinburgh
- Royal College of Psychiatrists
- Royal College of Radiologists
- Royal College of Surgeons of England
- Royal College of Surgeons of Edinburgh
- Royal College of Physicians and Surgeons of Glasgow
- Royal Medical Society
- Royal Society of Medicine
- Royal Society of Tropical Medicine and Hygiene

== North America ==
=== Canada ===
- Canadian Cardiovascular Society
- Canadian Medical Association
- College of Family Physicians of Canada
- College of Physicians and Surgeons of Ontario
- Libin Cardiovascular Institute of Alberta
- Royal College of Physicians and Surgeons of Canada

=== United States ===
- American Academy for Addiction Psychiatry
- American Academy of Child and Adolescent Psychiatry
- American Academy of Dermatology
- American Academy of Emergency Medicine
- American Academy of Family Physicians
- American Academy of Hospice and Palliative Medicine
- American Academy of Otolaryngology–Head and Neck Surgery
- American Academy of Medical Acupuncture
- American Academy of Neurology
- American Academy of Pediatrics
- American Academy of Psychiatry and the Law
- American Academy of Sleep Medicine
- American Association for Anatomy
- American Association for Geriatric Psychiatry
- American Association of Orthodontists
- American Association of Physician Specialists
- American College of Cardiology
- American College of Chest Physicians
- American College of Emergency Physicians
- American College of Gastroenterology
- American College of Obstetricians and Gynecologists
- American College of Physicians
- American College of Preventive Medicine
- American College of Radiology
- American College of Surgeons
- American Gastroenterological Association
- American Medical Association
  - Massachusetts Medical Society
- American Medical Women's Association
- American Muslim Health Professionals
- American Neuropsychiatric Association
- American Psychiatric Association
- American Psychoanalytic Association
- American Roentgen Ray Society
- American Society of Addiction Medicine
- American Society of Anesthesiologists
- American Society of Ophthalmic Trauma
- American Society of Plastic Surgeons
- American Society of Reproductive Medicine
- Association of American Medical Colleges
- Association of American Physicians and Surgeons
- National Association of Emergency Medical Technicians
- Radiological Society of North America
- Society for Pediatric Radiology
- Society of Interventional Radiology
- Society of Hospital Medicine
- Urgent Care Association of America

== South America ==
=== Brazil ===
- Brazilian Medical Association

== Other areas ==
- Cardiovascular System Dynamics Society (CSDS)
- Endocrine Society
- Gynecologic Oncology Group
- International Society of Biometeorology
- World Medical Association
- World Academy of Medical Sciences (WAMS)
