= Walk-in centres =

Walk-in centres may refer to:

- Urgent care center, USA
- Urgent treatment centre, UK
- Walk-in clinic, USA
