= AMD Alliance International =

Non-profit coalition against macular degeneration

AMD Alliance International is a non-profit coalition of the world's leading vision, seniors and research organizations working to raise awareness of age-related macular degeneration, understanding of available options for prevention, early detection, treatment, rehabilitation and support services. It is the only international organization in the world that concentrates exclusively on age related macular degeneration, the leading cause of vision loss in the developed world.

== Age-Related Macular Degeneration ==
AMD is an eye condition that causes loss of central vision, leaving only peripheral, or side, vision intact. AMD is the leading cause of visual impairment for people over 50 in the Western world.

=== Types & Detection ===
Macular degeneration is often related to aging, thus the name age-related macular degeneration (AMD or ARMD).

The two most common forms of AMD are dry and wet.

==== Dry AMD ====
This more common form, causes varying degrees of sight loss and is identified by the collection of yellow, fatty deposits called drusen in the macula the central part of the retina responsible for clear central vision.

==== Wet AMD ====
Occurs less often (10-15 percent of cases), but the chance for severe sight loss is much greater. It is characterized by development of abnormal, leaky blood vessels in the macula. Scar tissue may form causing irreversible blind spots and in many cases leads to legal blindness.

== AMD Alliance International Member Organizations ==
Argentina

- Fundación Oftalmológica Hugo Nano

Australia

- Macular Degeneration Foundation Australia
- Retina Australia
- Vision Australia Foundation

Austria

- EURAG: European Federation of Older Persons

Belgium

- Belgian Organization for the Prevention of Blindness

Brazil

- Retina Brasil

Canada

- CNIB
- Canadian Association of Optometrists
- Canadian Ophthalmological Society
- The Foundation Fighting Blindness-Canada
- International Federation on Ageing
- National Coalition on Vision Health

Finland

- Finnish Federation of the Visually Impaired

France

- Association Retina France

Germany

- Pro Retina Deutschland e.V.
- Berufsverband der Augenärzte Deutschlands
- DOG

Hong Kong

- Hong Kong Society for the Blind
- Retina Hong Kong

India

- LV Prasad Eye Institute
- National Society for the Prevention of Blindness - India

Ireland

- Fighting Blindness Ireland

Israel

- ESHEL: The Association for the Planning and
- International Federation on Ageing
- NAMAG – Association of AMD Patients in Israel

Italy

- International Agency for the Prevention of Blindness - Italian Branch
- Retina Italia Onlus
- Societá Italiana Retina

Netherlands

- Macula Degeneratie Vereniging

New Zealand

- Retina New Zealand
- The Royal New Zealand Foundation of the Blind

Poland

- Polish Association of the Blind

South Africa

- Retina South Africa

Spain

- Organización Nacional De Ciegos Españoles (ONCE)
- Spanish Vitreous and Retina Society

Switzerland

- Retina International
- Retina Suisse

Tunisia

- Nadi al Bassar, African Centre for Sight and Visual Sciences

United Kingdom

- Royal National Institute of Blind People
- Age Concern England
- Fight for Sight
- Macular Disease Society
- Wales Council for the Blind
- Dr. Bob Thompson, Honorary Life Chair

United States

- Alliance for Aging Research
- American Optometric Association
- American Optometric Association-Low Vision Section
- American Society of Ophthalmic Registered Nurses
- The Foundation Fighting Blindness, Inc.
- International Association for Audio Information Services
- Lighthouse International
- The Association for Macular Diseases
- Lions Clubs International
- Macular Degeneration Partnership
- Macular Degeneration Support (MD Support)
- Prevent Blindness America
- Hadley School for the Blind
- The Seniors Coalition
- Eye Care America
