= Retail clinics in the United States =

A retail clinic is a category of walk-in clinic located in retail stores, supermarkets and pharmacies that treat uncomplicated minor illnesses and provide preventative health care services. They are sometimes called "retail-based clinics", "convenient care clinics", or "nurse-in-a-box". Retail clinics in the United States are usually staffed by physician assistants (PAs) or nurse practitioners (NPs) and do not necessarily have a physician physically available onsite. Some, however, are staffed by physicians.

== Overview ==
As of December 2015, there are more than 2,000 retail clinics located in 41 states and Washington, DC in the United States. Retail clinics are staffed by physician assistants or nurse practitioners and most are open seven days a week – twelve hours a day during the workweek and eight hours a day on the weekend. To date, retail clinics have provided care through more than 35 million patient visits and have the capacity to provide care through over 10 million patient visits per year. It is estimated that the number of retail clinics will increase dramatically in the near future, with the total number of clinics surpassing 2,800 by 2017.

A major driver of the walk-in clinic growth trend is the focus on cost. As more patients with higher deductibles seek out care options, the reduced cost of retail settings is a viable option for routine care. For example, according to one analysis, the typical cost of diagnosing an earache was $59 at a retail or walk-in provider, $95 in doctor's office, $135 at urgent care, $184 in an emergency room.^{[Dead link]}

A 2015 report released by Manatt and the Robert Wood Johnson Foundation, Building a Culture of Health: The Value Proposition of Retail Clinics, finds that consumer demand for clinics is growing and the potential for future success is substantial. Among the major reasons why consumers choose to receive care at retail clinics are convenient hours, not needing to make an appointment to be seen by a provider, convenient location, and lower costs of services. Research has shown that the quality of the care received at retail clinics is comparable to, if not better than when the same care is provided in more traditional settings such as doctor's offices and emergency departments. One of the strongest indicators of retail health's expanding role in the healthcare landscape is the increasing number of partnerships between clinics and hospitals and health systems. To date, there are more than 100 of these partnerships throughout the country and this number is expected to grow.

== Services provided ==
Most retail clinics in the United States treat adults and children over the age of 18 months. Retail clinics treat common family illnesses, such as:

- Cold and flu
- Sinus infections
- Allergies
- Minor injuries, burns and rashes
- Pinkeye
- Sore throat
- Headaches
- Head lice
- Ringworm
- Warts
- Sprains and strains
- Bronchitis
- Ear infections
- Urinary tract infections
- Diarrhea and intestinal infections
- Allergy test

Some retail clinics in the United States provide physical therapy with a specialist.

Retail clinics also provide preventative care, including health screenings, vaccinations, and physical exams. They may serve as sample collection points for blood, urine and feces for laboratory tests, which are then sent to external labs.

By definition, retail clinics offer a more narrow range of services (usually limited to 25 - 30 of the most common diagnoses) than are offered in traditional primary care offices. This limited scope of services is seen in both nurse practitioner and physician-staffed retail clinics, and is an integral part of the retail clinic model.

== Staffing ==
Retail clinics in the United States are usually staffed by Physician Assistants (PAs), Nurse Practitioners (NPs) or other advanced practice nurses. Some retail clinics are staffed by Physician Assistants (PAs).

Physician Assistants are health care professionals licensed to practice medicine. Physician Assistants may or may not be required to collaborate with physicians depending on the legislation in the jurisdiction in which the Physician Assistant practices. With appropriate training and supervision, PAs provide health care that is similar in quality to that of a primary care physician.

Nurse Practitioners are registered nurses with advanced education and training who provide a defined scope of health care services. NPs engage in health promotion, patient evaluation, treatment, diagnosis, education, counseling, case management and coordination of care. One study found that patients of advanced practice nurses had close outcomes to patients of primary care physicians and physician assistants.

== Companies in the United States ==
Below are the top retail clinic operators in the United States and the number of clinics that they operate as of November 2015:

| Clinic Brand | Host Retailer | # of Clinics |
|---|---|---|
| MinuteClinic | CVS | 1019 |
| Healthcare Clinic at Select Walgreens (formerly TakeCare Clinic) | Walgreens | 440 |
| The Little Clinic | Kroger, Fry's, King Soopers, Dillons | 190 |
| Target Clinic | Target | 78 |
| RediClinic | H-E-B Stores | 46 |
| FastCare | Walmart, Giant Eagle, ShopRite | 25 |
| Baptist Express Care at Walmart | Walmart | 18 |
| Walmart Care Clinic | Walmart | 17 |
| Aurora QuickCare | Walmart | 10 |
| Lindora Health Clinics | RiteAid | 7 |

The Convenient Care Association (CCA) is the national trade association that represents the industry to sustain its growth and share best practices and standards of operation.
