= Sagus International =

American furniture company

Sagus International, Inc.
- "Transforming Environment - Improving Results"
- Type: Private
- Industry: Furniture
- Founded: 2001
- Headquarters: Oak Brook, Illinois, USA
- Number of employees: 800
- Website: www.sagusinternational.com

Sagus International is an American furniture manufacturer. Sagus’s core business is the manufacture of furniture and casework for the educational, hospitality, health care, and commercial sectors.

== Overview ==
In 2011, Sagus International was acquired by HNI Corporation. Sagus International goes to market through its three divisions: Artco-Bell Corporation, LSI Corporation of America, and Midwest Folding Products. Sagus is headquartered in Oak Brook, IL, with manufacturing locations in Temple, TX, Minneapolis, MN, and Chicago, IL. Sagus has over 800 employees and operates more than 1,000,000 square feet (93,000 m^{2}) of manufacturing and distribution space.

The three operating divisions of Sagus International focus on a few core markets:

- K-12 public and private schools
- Colleges and universities
- Healthcare facilities
- Science research and laboratory facilities
- Special events and conference facilities
- Commercial sector

Distribution to these markets is handled by authorized dealers and, in some cases, manufacturer's representatives.

== Divisions ==
Sagus operates three divisions in the furniture and casegoods industries:

=== Artco-Bell Corporation ===
Artco-Bell has been located in Temple, TX, since 1962, the year it was founded by R.V. Hardegree. Artco-Bell designs and produces classroom furniture. Key product groups include seating products, student desks, combination chair desks, activity tables, computer tables, teachers’ desks and vertical files.

=== LSI Corporation of America ===
LSI has been located in Minneapolis, MN, since 1968. The company manufactures and installs the laminate casework most often specified by architects in America. LSI’s products are used throughout the educational, healthcare, industrial and government markets.

=== Midwest Folding Products ===
Midwest Folding Products manufactures furniture for the education and hospitality markets. Midwest has been located in Chicago, IL, since 1947. Key product groups include mobile cafeteria tables with attached seating, folding tables, table and chair caddies, multi-level table and chair storage and handling systems, portable stages and risers.

== Community ==
In 2008, Sagus began working on using their areas of expertise to improve classroom environments. One of the company's first community projects was to remake two classrooms in two Chicago high schools. In partnership with Legat Architects, Sagus donated its time and products to transform the science lab at Walter Payton College Prep and a social studies classroom at William Harper High School into more flexible and mobile classrooms that are easily reconfigurable for different teaching approaches. In recognition of its efforts on the project, Sagus was awarded the Chicago Public Schools' 2009 Outstanding Partnership Award.
