= Academy of Family Physicians of India =

- Abbreviation: AFPI
- Formation: 2010
- Type: Professional association
- Purpose: Empowering primary care physicians in India. Strengthening healthcare delivery system in India
- Headquarters: New Delhi
- Location: India
- Region served: All over India
- Official language: English
- Website: afpinational.org

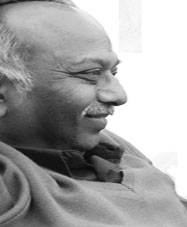
Late Dr. P. Padmanabhan - Noted public health specialist and family medicine patron. AFPI has instituted an oration award in his memory.

The Academy of Family Physicians of India (AFPI) is a professional academic society and non-profit organization in India that was founded in 2010. It was established to promote the development of family medicine and primary healthcare in the country.

Family medicine is a medical specialty practiced by a significant number of doctors in India. While organizations such as the Indian Medical Association College of General Practitioners (IMA CGP) and Family Physicians Association of India (FPAI) have existed for several decades, AFPI was formed to focus specifically on the academic development of family medicine in India.

AFPI is a member of the World Organization of Family Doctors (WONCA). The academy operates through several state chapters and has members across India. Its membership includes family physicians, general practitioners, and medical officers who provide care across various demographics and medical conditions.

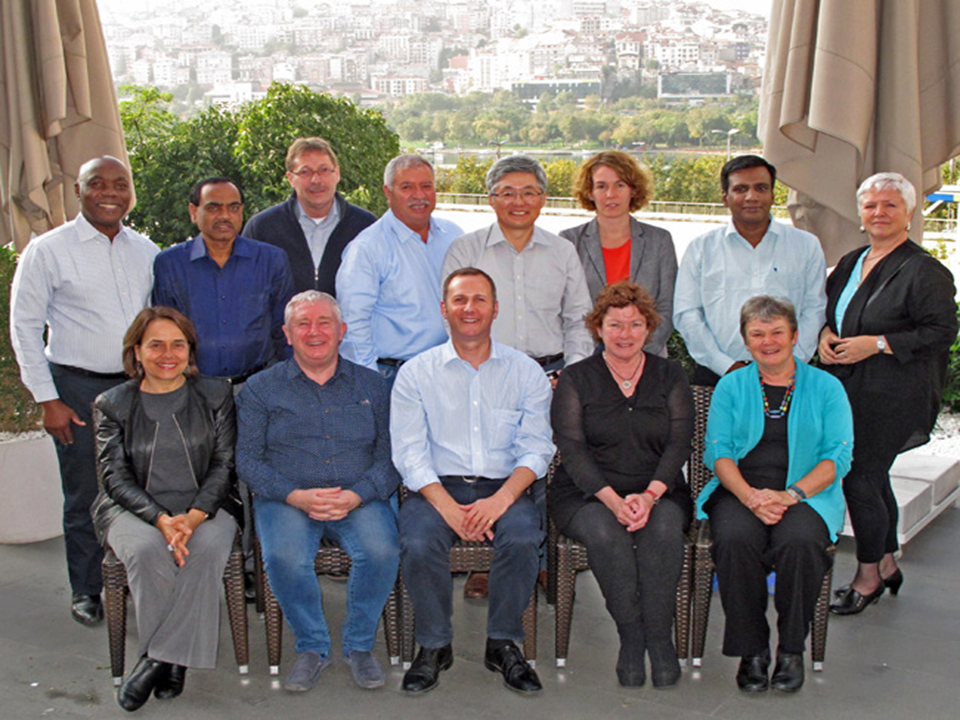
AFPI participation at global forums: Dr. Raman Kumar National President AFPI is a member of WONCA World Executive and YDM rep. Photograph taken - Istanbul Turkey October 2015

== Advocacy role of AFPI ==
The academy advocates professional development and training for primary care physicians in India for better health outcomes. AFPI advocates academic institutionalization of community health services. As an outcome of advocacy initiatives of AFPI, the first MD family medicine program was started at Kozhikode Medical College, Kerala. Under PMSSY (Prime Minister's Swasthys Suraksha Yojana) all newly instituted AIIMS (All India Institute of Medical Sciences) have established a new department in the name of department of community medicine and family medicine.

AFPI has supported equal professional opportunities and career progression for the primary care physicians at par with any other speciality.

== National Consultation on Family Medicine Programme 2013 ==
NHSRC (National Health System Resource Centre) conducted a national consultation on family medicine in partnership with AFPI. The academy is working for popularizing academic family medicine across the country.

== Family Medicine in National Health Policy 2017 ==
The National Health Policy (NHP) 2017 announced recently, specifically mentions family medicine speciality and mandates popularization of programs like MD in family medicine or general practice. Previously National Health Policy 2002 had strongly recommended promotion of family medicine training in India. NPH 2017 recommends that a large number of distance and continuing education options for general practitioners in both the private and the public sectors, which would upgrade their skills to manage the large majority of cases at local level, thus avoiding unnecessary referrals.

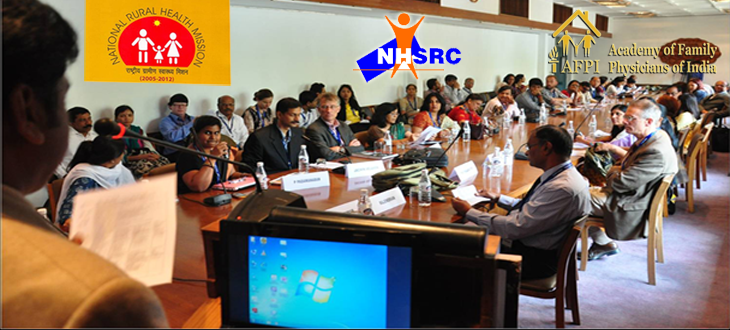
National Consultation on Family Medicine: Organized by NHSRC Ministry of Health and Family Welfare in partnership with Academy of Family Physicians of India India International Center New Delhi 19 April 2013

== National conference of Family medicine and Primary Care (FMPC) ==
FMPC (National Conference on Family Medicine and Primary Care) is the official academic event of AFPI which provides forum for primary care physicians and health care professionals across spectrum to discuss and disseminate their academic as well as professional experiences. FMPC is also open to ordinary citizen for participation towards setting healthcare agenda. The second national conference was organized from 19–22 November 2015 at Indian Habitat Centre New Delhi. The conference was addressed by union minister for health and family welfare government of India Mr JP Nadda.

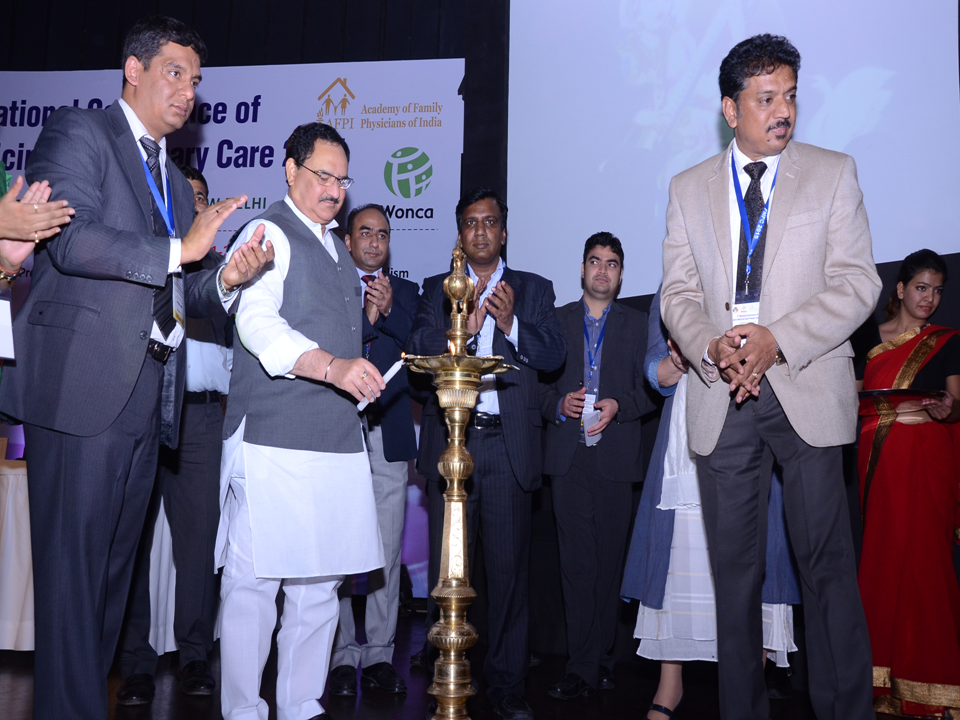
Inauguration ceremony of FMPC 2015 22 November 2015 by Union Health Minister Government of India Mr JP Nadda

The third national conference (FMPC 2017) was organized at IMA House, Kaloor, Kochi from 27 to 29 January 2017. The president of the National Board of Examination (NBE) Dr. Abhijat Sheth graced FMPC 2017 as chief guest. Dr. Bipin Batra Executive Director NBE, delivered the 2nd Dr. P. Padmanabhan Memorial Award Oration during this event. The fourth National Conference of Family Medicine and Primary Care is scheduled in the month of August 2019 in Bangalore, the capital city of Karnataka state of India.

== Family Medicine Postgraduate Update (FMPC) ==
AFPI organizes family medicine post graduate updates in conjunction with FMPC. The first FMPG Update was organized at Institute of Liver and Biliary Sciences New Delhi on 19–20 November 2015. The purpose FMPG is to provide to prepare post graduate trainees for recent updates in the area of family medicine and primary care. FMPG also provides skill up gradation opportunity to the practising family physicians, general practitioners and medical officers.

== Run for Family Health ==
AFPI launched run for family health campaign on 21 April 2015, aimed at promoting awareness about role physical activity and exercise towards promotion of good health. Noted athletic hero Mr Milkha Singh launched the campaign.

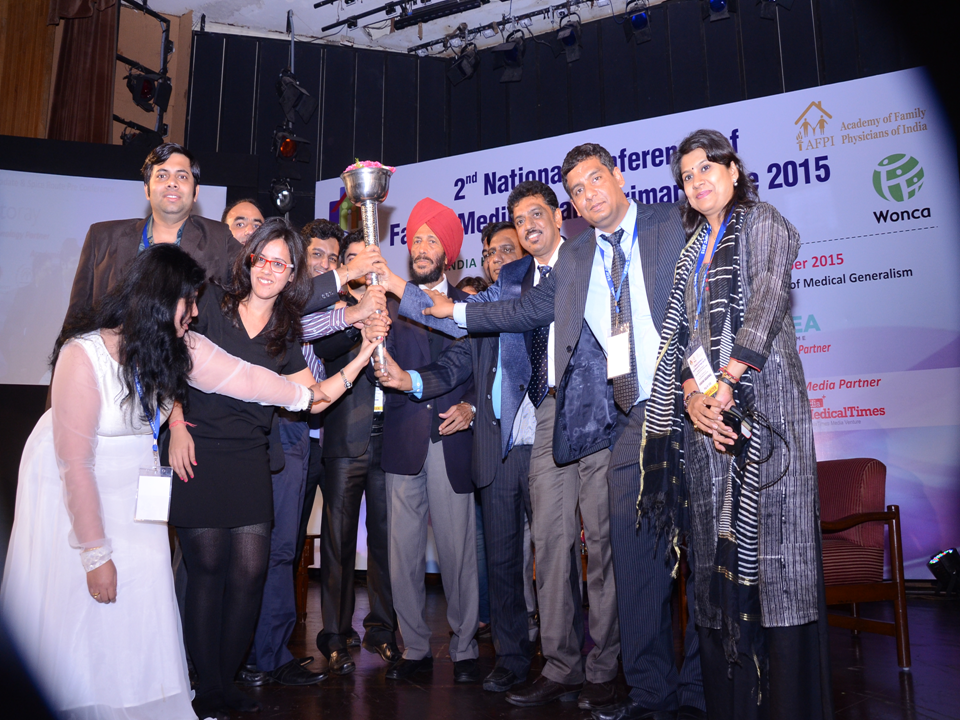
AFPI Campaign Run for Family Health - Physical Activity for all family members. launched by Olympian and Indian Athletic legend Mr Milkha Singh

== The P. Padmanabhan Memorial Oration Award ==
AFPI has instituted an oration award in the name of Dr. P. Padmanabhan seeing as he was a noted public health expert who worked at National Health System Resource Center. He was renowned for his contribution to the public health system of Tamil Nadu state specially in the field of maternal and child health. He was a great supporter of family medicine training for medical officers and envisaged family medicine as solution of medical care in community setting. The first P. Padmanabhan memorial award was delivered by Keshav Desiraju former health secretary government of India at FMPC 2015. The second award was received by Dr. Bipin Batra Executive Director of the National Board of Examination.

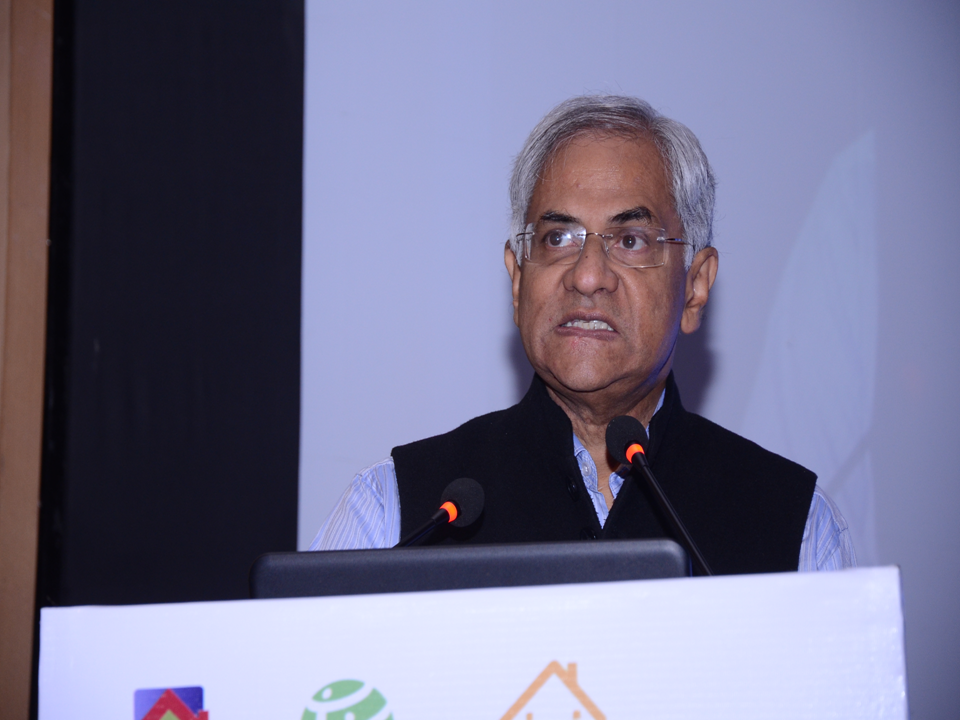
First Dr. P. Padmanabhan Memorial Award was delivered by Keshav Desiraju Government of India on 21 November 2015 during FMPC 2015.

== Dr. Jyoti Parekh and Dr. Ramnik Parekh Award ==
Senior doctor couple from Mumbai instituted this award to support young doctors and medical students from South Asia Region, training in the field of family medicine, enabling them to participate at international conference and academic activities. Drs Jyoti and Raminik have pledged a donation of INR 100,000 annually to AFPI to be disbursed as award money. Young doctors from South Asia region (India, Pakistan, Bangladesh, Sri Lanka, Bhutan, Maldives, Nepal) are eligible to apply for this award opportunity.

== International collaborations ==
The Academy of Family Physicians of India is a member of World Organization of Family Doctors (WONCA). AFPI was an organizing partner for WONCA South Asia Regional conferences in Mumbai 2011 and Chennai 2014. The academy facilitates international exchange opportunities for family medicine trainees through WONCA FM 360 exchange programs across world. AFPI is a founding member of "The Spice Route Movement" - forum for young and recently qualified family medicines specialists in the WONCA South Asia and SAARC region.

== 15th World Rural Health Conference New Delhi New Delhi 2018 ==
Academy of Family Physicians of India (AFPI) hosted the 15th WONCA World Rural Health conference (WRHC2018) from 26 to 29 April 2018 at India Habitat Center New Delhi. The theme of the conference was "Healing the heart of healthcare". The conference attracted more than a thousand delegates from 40 countries. The Vice President of India Mr M Venkaiah Naidu inaugurated the conference in the presence of Mr Ashwani Choubey Minister of state for Health and Family Welfare Government India. WRHC 2018 also hosted national consultation on strengthening rural primary healthcare in India in partnership with Niti Ayog, Public Health Foundation of India. Leading Indian and international universities participated in the event. The conference unanimously culminated into adoption of Delhi declaration 2018 which call for rural proofing of policy across world, if countries are to achieve sustainable development goals by 2030. Delhi declaration has been endorsed by World Health Organization (WHO).
