= Keshav Desiraju =

Indian bureaucrat (1955–2021)

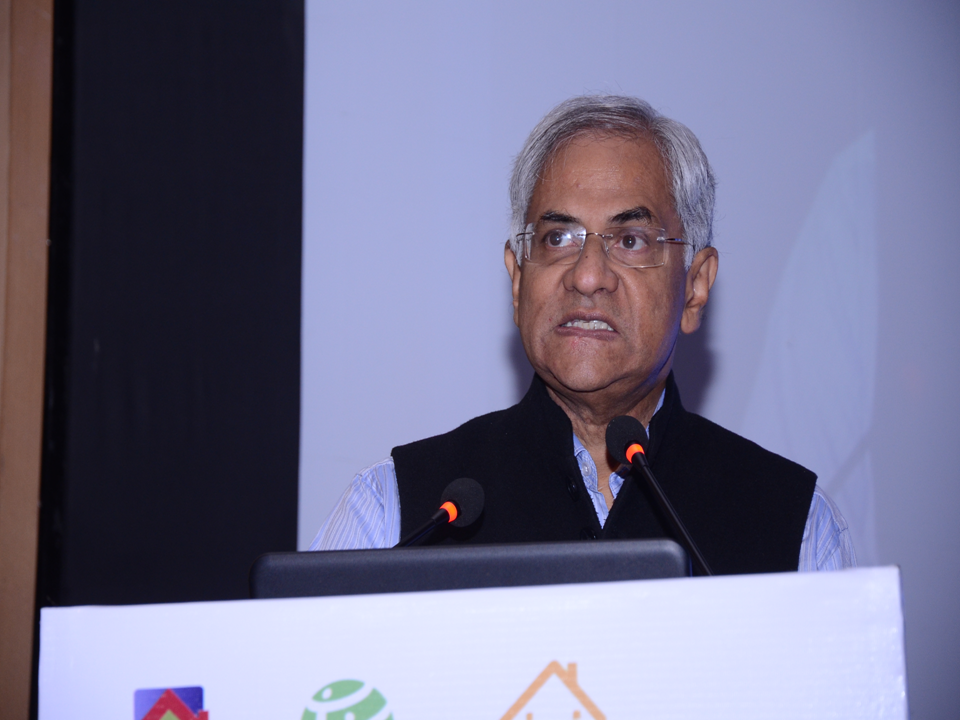
- Desiraju delivering the inaugural P. Padmanabhan memorial award, 2015
- Born: 11 May 1955; Chennai, Tamil Nadu, India
- Died: 5 September 2021 (aged 66); Chennai, Tamil Nadu, India
- Occupation: Bureaucrat
- Known for: Public health, mental health, disability, primary and community healthcare

Keshav Desiraju (11 May 1955 – 5 September 2021) was an Indian bureaucrat who served as the union health secretary of the country. He was known for his contributions to mental health and community healthcare and was the architect of the country's Mental Healthcare Act of 2017.

== Early life ==
Desiraju was born on 11 May 1955 and grew up in South Bombay, where he attended the Cathedral and John Connon School. He was the grandson of former Indian President Sarvepalli Radhakrishnan and the nephew of Indian historian Sarvepalli Gopal.

He completed his Master's degree in Economics from the University of Cambridge and also had a Master of Public Administration from the John F. Kennedy School of Government at Harvard University. He was a member of the Indian Administrative Service belonging to the 1978 Uttarakhand cadre.

== Career ==
Desiraju was a member of the Indian Administrative Service and served as the union secretary with the Ministry of Health. He had earlier served as the health secretary for the state of Uttarakhand. As a bureaucrat, Desiraju focused on public health, primary health care, disability, mental health, and community health. During his term as the additional secretary with the Ministry of Health, he initiated the ban on gutka and chewable forms of tobacco, an act that was later adopted and replicated by many states.

He also advanced the Mental Healthcare Bill, 2012, that later went on to become the Mental Healthcare Act, 2017. The bill was considered path-breaking and introduced provisions that allowed for a person to call out the nature of treatment that one should be provided if they were to develop a mental illness later in their lives. An editorial in the British Journal of Psychiatry read "The drafters of India's new legislation have demonstrated wisdom and vision in articulating a legally binding right to such care despite the inevitable challenges and complexities of such a bold move. The rest of the world should watch, listen and learn." His approach was described as a pragmatic middle of the ground approach trying to draw a fine balance protecting patients from potentially exploitative care providers and also family members while guaranteeing "right to health" in emergencies. He also led actions from India on getting the World Health Organization to pass a special resolution on mental health and led to the development of the organization's Comprehensive Mental Health Action Plan in 2013.

During his service with the health ministry, he also advanced efforts that resulted in the National Institute of Mental Health and Neurosciences being designated as an institute of national importance. He also led the establishment of the National Technical Advisory Group on Immunization (NTAGI), an expert group that examined linkages between vaccination and immunization and determined the vaccines to be included in the national health program for administration across India. He was also noted to have strengthened the governance systems in the National Health Mission. His stint with the health ministry, however, was cut short in February 2014 when he was moved away from the health ministry and over to the Ministry of Consumer Affairs. The move was believed to be due to his dissent with the leadership at the Medical Council of India. He continued to maintain his focus on the healthcare space addressing topics of mental health and corruption in the healthcare space even after moving away from the ministry. He also co-wrote a book, Healers or Predators, which focused on corruption in the healthcare industry in India. As a bureaucrat he was widely recognized for his "impeccable honesty and integrity".

After his retirement from the administrative services, he was appointed the chairperson of the governing board of the Population Foundation of India, a non-profit organization focused on community health and population strategies for the country. He was on the board of directors of many organizations, including The Banyan, Latika Roy Foundation, Center for Disease Dynamics, Economics & Policy in Washington D.C., and the Auroville foundation.

Desiraju was a follower of Carnatic music and wrote a biography, considered definitive, of Indian Carnatic music singer M. S. Subbulakshmi, titled Of Gifted Voice. At the time of his death, he was working on a book on Carnatic music composer Thyagaraja and mastering Telugu for the project.

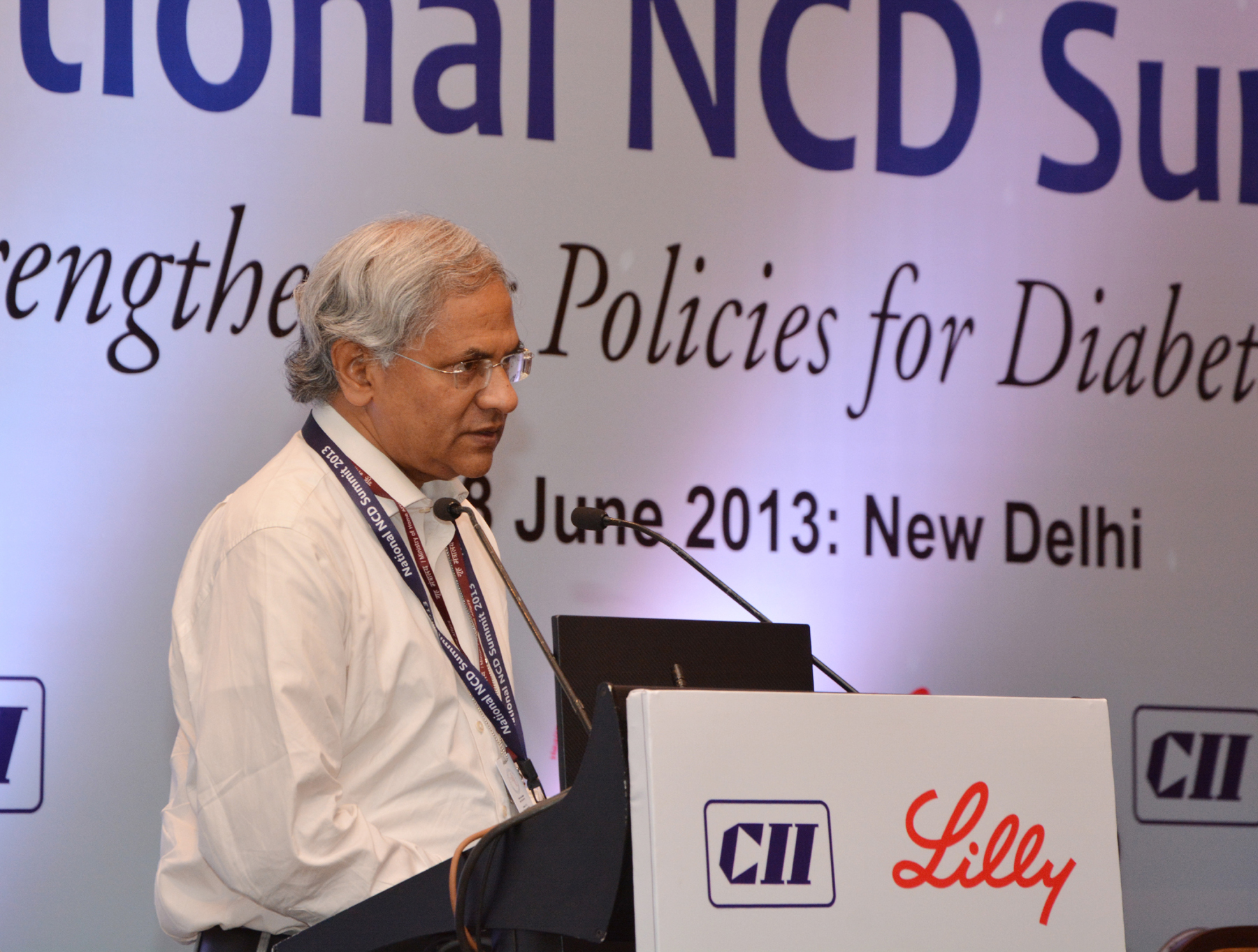
Desiraju addressing the inaugural National NCD Summit, New Delhi, 2013

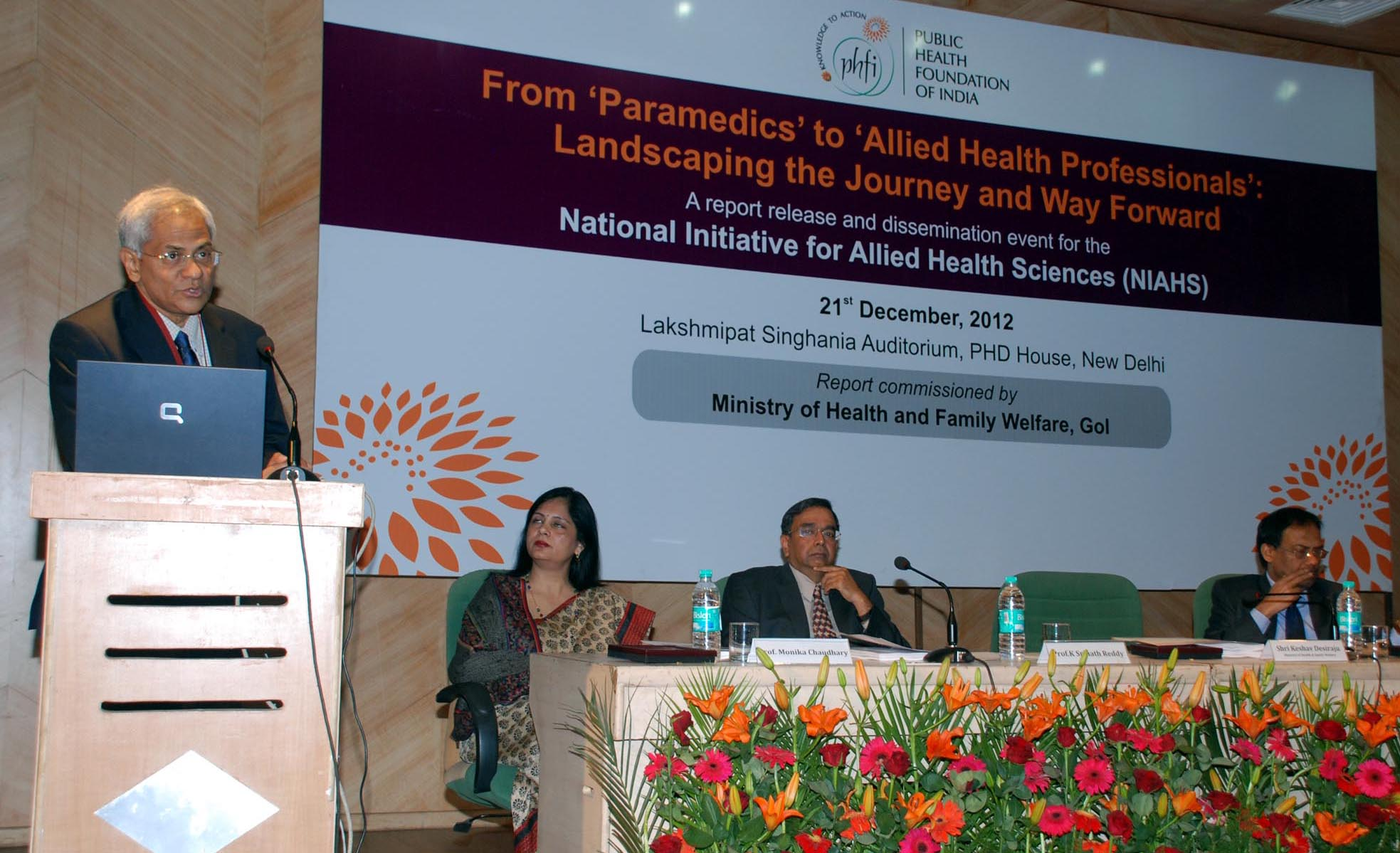
Desiraju on the release of the National Initiative for Allied Health Sciences (NIAHS) report, New Delhi, 2012

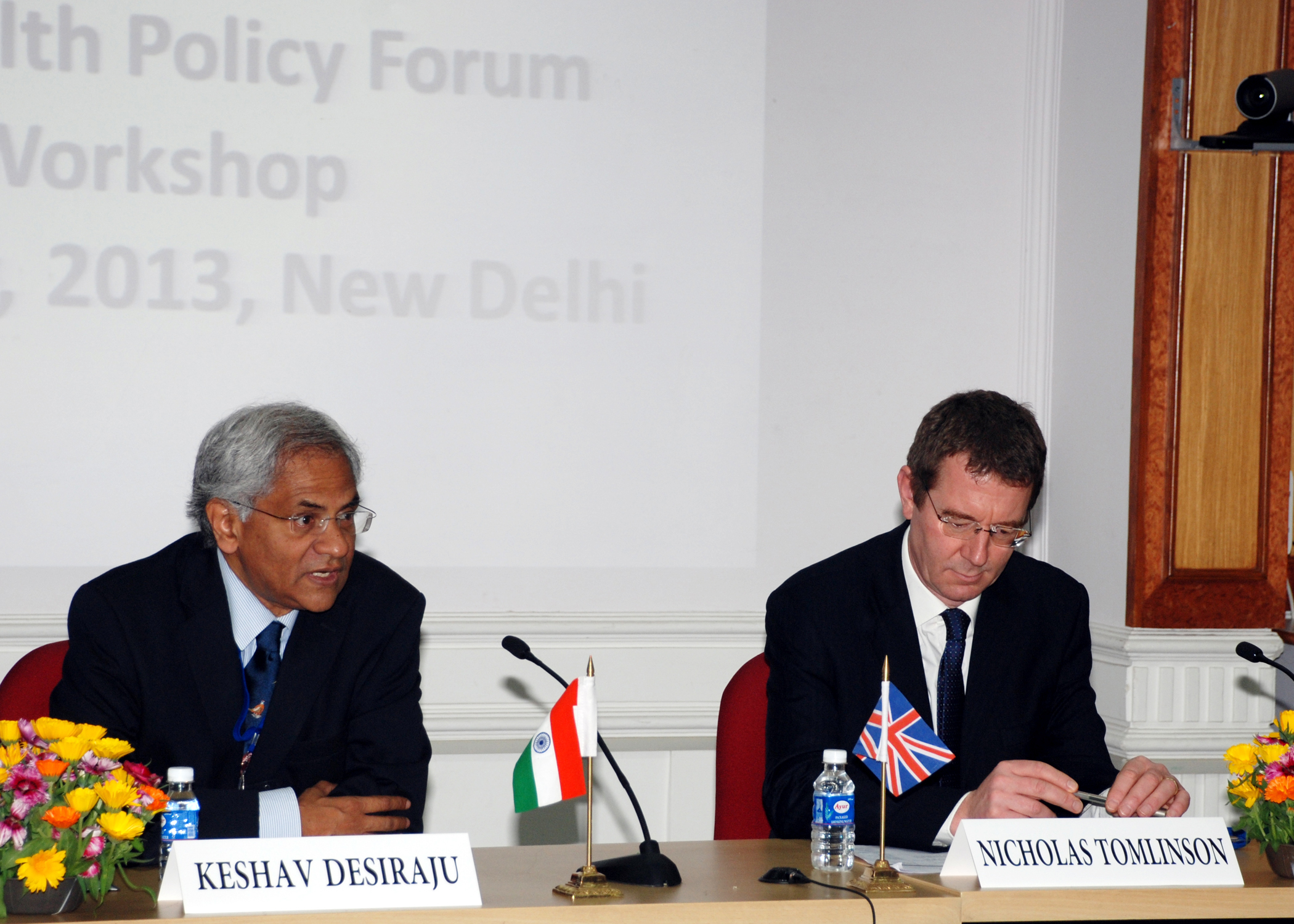
Desiraju addressing the India-UK Health Policy Forum, New Delhi, 2013

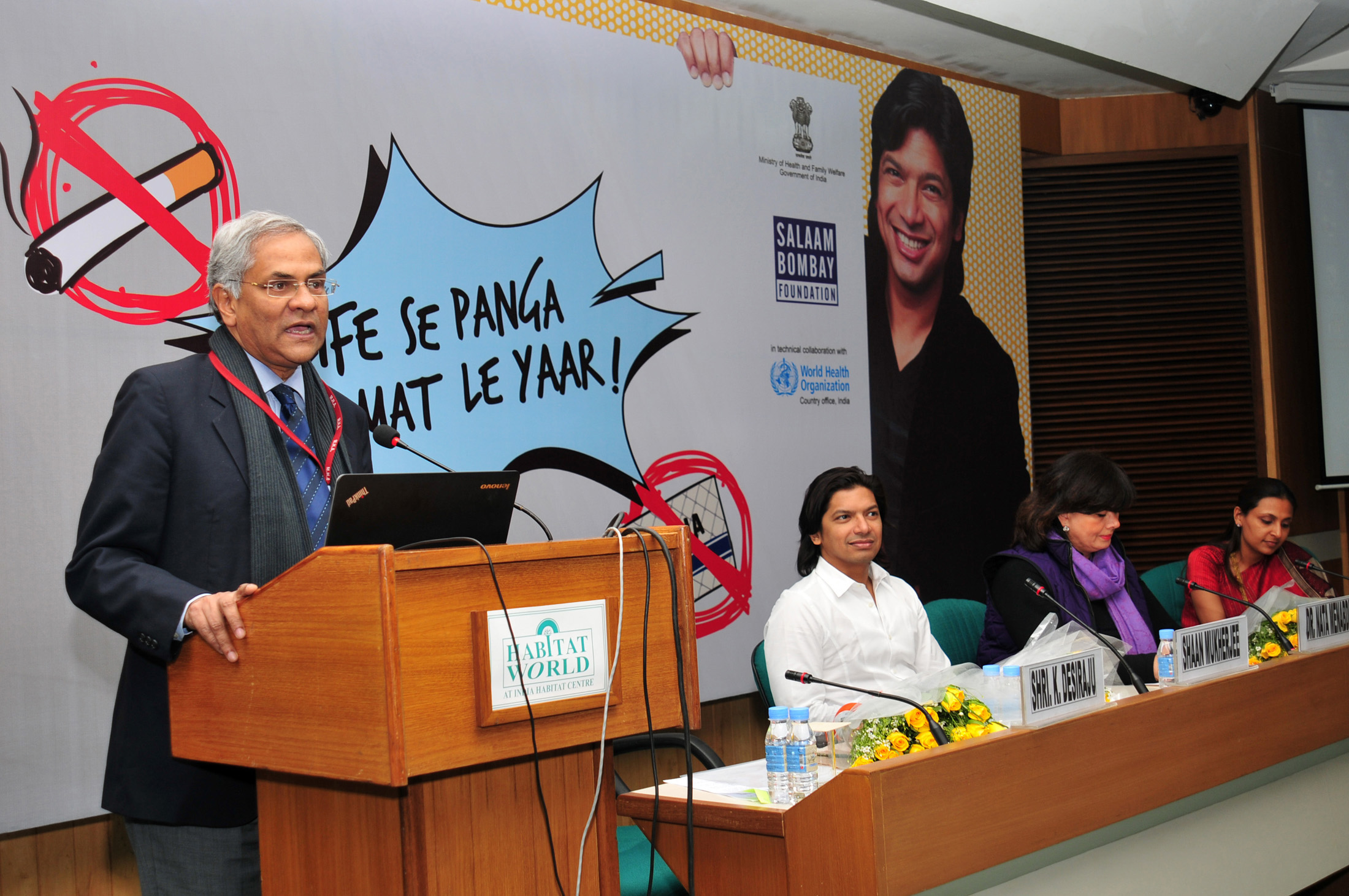
Desiraju at the launch of the media campaign of the National Tobacco Control Program, New Delhi, 2012

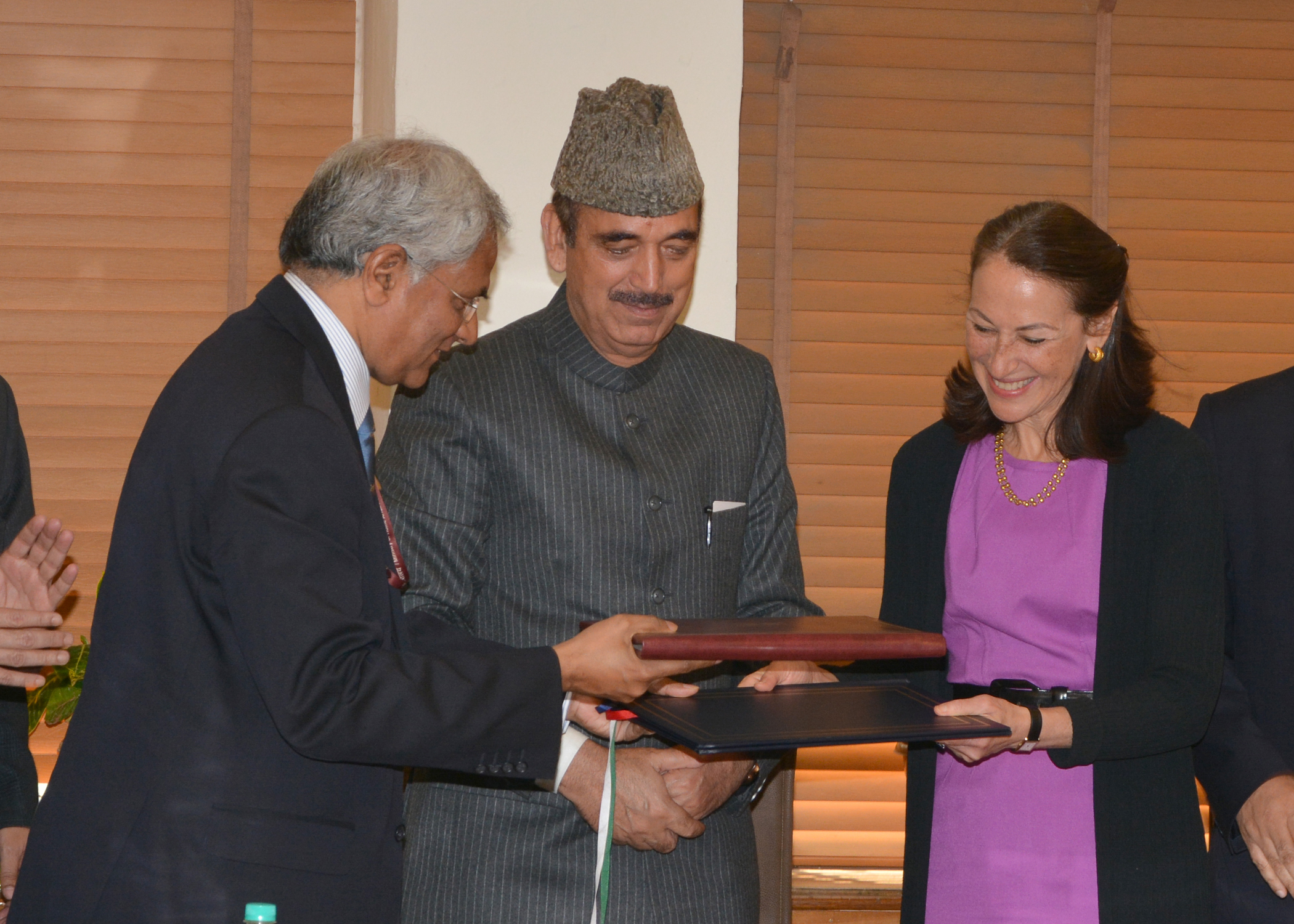
Desiraju exchanging an MOU with the Commissioner of the U.S. Food and Drug Administration, Margaret A. Hamburg, New Delhi, 2014

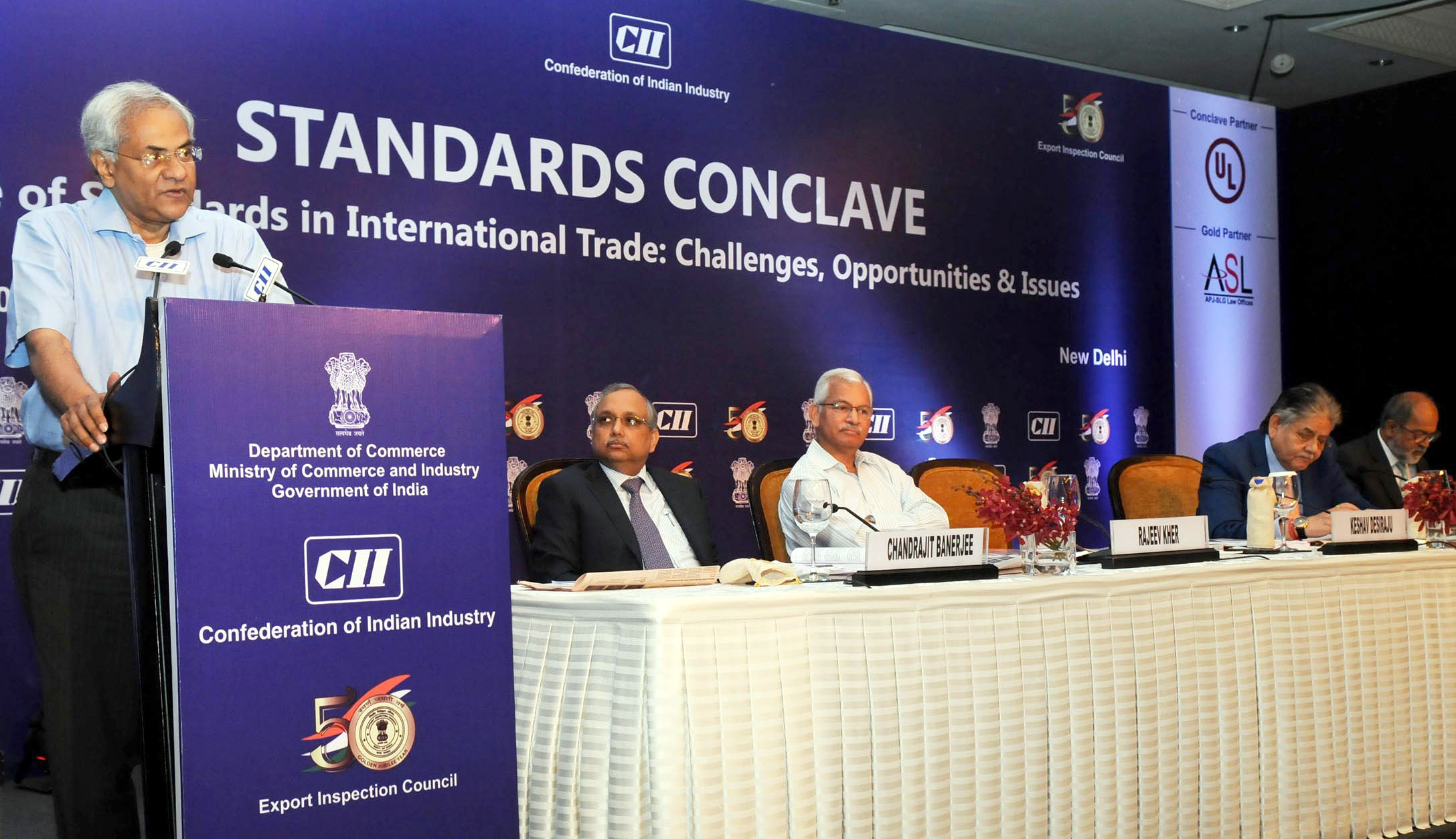
Desiraju addressing a CII standards conclave, New Delhi 2015

== Personal life ==
Desiraju was not married. He followed Carnatic music and generally used to attend the annual Madras Music Season. As an art collector, he collected the works of Raja Ravi Varma. Desiraju died from acute coronary syndrome on 5 September 2021, in Chennai, in the Indian state of Tamil Nadu. He was 66.

== Published works ==
- Desiraju, Keshav (2020). Of Gifted Voice : The Life and Art of M.S. Subbulakshmi. HarperCollins Publishers India. ISBN 978-93-90327-54-6. OCLC 1231547970.
- Desiraju, Keshav (2021). "Do we need more All India Institute of Medical Sciences - Type institutions?". Journal of Medical Evidence. 2 (1): 71–72. doi:10.4103/jme.jme_32_21. ISSN 2667-0720. S2CID 236727730.
- Desiraju, Keshav (2018). Healers or Predators? : Healthcare Corruption in India. S. Nundy, Sanjay Nagral. New Delhi, India. ISBN 978-0-19-948954-1. OCLC 1046567144.
- Desiraju, Keshav; Minas, Harry; van Ginneken, Nadja; Dal Poz, Mario R; Kakuma, Ritsuko; Morris, Jodi E; Saxena, Shekhar; Scheffler, Richard M (2011). "Human resources for mental health care: current situation and strategies for action". The Lancet. 378 (9803): 1654–1663. doi:10.1016/s0140-6736(11)61093-3. ISSN 0140-6736. PMID 22008420. S2CID 11901504.
- Barbosa da Silva, Jarbas; Desiraju, Keshav; Matsoso, Precious; Minghui, Ren; Salagay, Oleg (2014). "BRICS cooperation in strategic health projects". Bulletin of the World Health Organization. 92 (6): 388. doi:10.2471/blt.14.141051. ISSN 0042-9686. PMC 4047817. PMID 24940008.
- Desiraju, Keshav (1998). Ashish, Madhava (ed.). "The scientific sadhu". India International Centre Quarterly. 25 (2/3): 167–169. ISSN 0376-9771. JSTOR 23005690.
- Desiraju, Keshav; Jain, Yogesh (2017). "It is not enough to grieve; we must learn from Gorakhpur". Indian Journal of Medical Ethics. 2 (4): 221–223. doi:10.20529/IJME.2017.080. PMID 28918380.
