= International Federation on Ageing =

- Fédération Internationale du Vieillissement
- Abbreviation: IFA
- Formation: 1973
- Type: INGO
- Headquarters: Toronto
- Website: ifa.ngo

The International Federation on Ageing (IFA; French: Fédération Internationale du Vieillissement) is an international non-governmental organization founded in 1973 and based in Toronto, Ontario, Canada working in the field of ageing, older persons and ageing-related issues such as ageism, The intent of the organisation is for NGOs, the corporate sector, academia, government, and individuals working together to make, according to the IFA’s mission statement, a "change for older people throughout the world by stimulating, collecting, analyzing, and disseminating information on rights, policies and practices that improve the quality of life of people as they age". The IFA has General Consultative Status at the United Nations Economic and Social Council (ECOSOC).

== History ==
At the beginning of the 70s, the United Nations started to become interested in the issue of ageing; and the need for an international organization promoting information exchange at an international level was identified. During the summer of 1972, at an initiative hosted by AARP, twenty representatives of thirteen nations met at the London School of Economics to discuss forming an organization one year later, in December 1973, they met again to formally approve a constitution and bylaws for an International Federation on Ageing.

In the early 80s, the IFA was one of the first organizations to call for a World Assembly on Ageing (WAA). An assembly was finally organized in 1982 and resulted in the world’s first International Plan of Action on Ageing. IFA’s General Secretary at the time, William Kerrigan, became the Secretary-General of the World Assembly. The IFA secretariat remained mostly at AARP headquarters (with brief stints in the UK and Australia) until the early 1990s when the support role of AARP formally ended, and the secretariat moved to Montreal, Quebec, Canada.

The organization obtained Consultative status with the Economic and Social Council (ECOSOC) of the United Nations in 1995, the World Health Organization (WHO), the International Labour Organization (ILO), UNESCO and other international agencies. In March 2009, the headquarters were transferred from Montreal to Toronto, Ontario, Canada.

== International relationships ==
UN ECOSOC

Since 1995 the IFA has had general consultative status at the UN ECOSOC, the highest accreditation a NGO can receive, reserved for NGOs that are closely involved with the economic and social life, that make substantive and sustained contributions to help the achievement of the objectives of the United Nations and are broadly representative of major segments of society in a large number of countries in different regions in the world. Currently, about 3750 NGOs have consultative status at the UN ECOSOC and about 150 have general consultative status.

World Health Organization

The IFA, along with 183 other NGOs, has official relations with WHO, the only category of formal relations recognized by WHO. The allows the organisation to appoint a representative to participate in WHO's meetings, the right to submit memorandum to the Director-General and the right to access to documentation.

UNESCO, ILO and other organizations

The IFA also works with other UN or non-UN organizations such as UNESCO (Operational Status) and ILO (Second Category Consultative Status). It also has representation on the UN Committee for Human Rights, the UN Committee for the Older Women and UNESCAP (Economic and Social Commission for Asia and the Pacific).

== Conferences ==
The IFA organizes the biennial Global Conference on Ageing in a host city, which attracts over a thousand attendants.

=== Past conferences ===
Name of the conference/workshop	Venue and date	Theme
IFA 1st Global Conference on Ageing	Pune, India, 1992	Ageing
IFA 2nd Global Conference on Ageing	Jerusalem, Israel, 1995	Global Ageing
IFA 3rd Global Conference on Ageing	Durban, South Africa, 1997	Ageing and Diversity: Towards Empowerment and Fulfillment
IFA 4th Global Conference on Ageing	Montréal, Canada, 1999	Towards a Society for All Ages
IFA 5th Global Conference on Ageing	Mar del Plata, Argentina, 2000	The Millennium Conference on Ageing: Challenges
IFA 6th Global Conference on Ageing	Perth, Australia, 2002	Maturity Matters
IFA 7th Global Conference on Ageing	Singapore, 2004	Global Ageing: Sustaining Development
IFA 8th Global Conference on Ageing	Copenhagen, Denmark, May 2006	North-South Challenge
IFA 9th Global Conference on Ageing	Montreal, Quebec, Canada, September 2008	Shaping Today Tomorrow
International Forum on Ageing in Place and Age Friendly Cities	Akita, Japan, October 2009	Ageing in Place, Age Friendly Cities and the Application of technology
IFA 10th Global Conference on Ageing	Melbourne, Australia, May 2010	Climate for Change – Ageing into the Future
IFA 11th Global Conference on Ageing	Prague, Czech Republic, May 2012	Ageing Connects
International Workshop on Human Rights of Older Persons in Asia-Pacific Region	Thiruvananthapuram, India, June 2012	Rights of older persons in the region
International Workshop on Ageing and Healthy Environments	Yaoundé, Cameroon, May 2013	Issues around elderly people and ageing in the region
International Istanbul Initiative on Ageing	Istanbul, Turkey, October 2013	Achieving Intergenerational Solidarity
IFA 12th Global Conference on Ageing	Hyderabad, India, June 2014	Health, Security and Community
IFA 13th Global Conference on Ageing	Brisbane, Australia, June 2016	Rights of Older People
IFA 14th Global Conference on Ageing	Toronto, Canada, August 2018	Healthy Ageing

=== Upcoming Conferences ===
Name of the conference/workshop	Venue and date	Theme
IFA 15th Global Conference on Ageing	Toronto, Canada, November 2021	Rights Matter

== Publications ==
eNews

The IFA sends electronic bi-monthly newsletters focusing on policy, practice, and their impact on the older person, to update members on the work of the IFA, to raise issues and to share practice and news on the field of ageing.

Reports

The IFA has produced and assists in producing important reports on the field of ageing at an international scale.

== Contributions/Achievements ==
=== Declaration of the Rights and Responsibilities of Older Persons ===
In 1990, the IFA published its Declaration of the Rights and Responsibilities of Older Persons, a two-page document detailing the rights of older people regarding care, dignity, self-fulfillment, participation and independence. This document is the foundation of the UN principles of Older Persons, adopted in December 1991, aiming to be integrated in every program for older people.

=== Montreal Declaration on the Rights and Duties of Older People ===
In 1999, the IFA organized the 4th Global Conference on Ageing in Montreal which resulted in the Montreal Declaration on the Rights and Duties of Older People. This document was turned over to the United Nations Ageing Unit at the closing plenary session of the Conference on Wednesday, September 8, 1999 and later used by other international organizations including the Council of the European Union.

=== Global Survey ===
In December 2000, the IFA completed the first Global Survey, a global opinion poll on the effectiveness of the UN Principles for Older People. 24,000 older people worldwide participated in the study.
