= Walk-in clinic =

Medical facility where no appointment is needed

A walk-in clinic in Toronto, Canada.

A walk-in clinic, also known as a walk-in center, is a medical facility that accepts patients on a walk-in basis and with no appointment required. A number of healthcare service providers fall under the walk-in clinic umbrella including urgent care centers, retail clinics and even many free clinics or community health clinics. Walk-in clinics offer the advantages of being accessible and often inexpensive. It is estimated that there are nearly 11,000 walk-in clinics in America, although it is impossible to calculate an exact number given the variable and ill-defined nature of the category. Urgent care centers make up the largest percentage of walk-in clinics in America with an estimated 9,000 locations nationwide. In fact, consumers often erroneously refer to all walk-in clinics as urgent care centers, and vice versa. Retail clinics are the next most prevalent in the industry with 1,443 locations as of July 1, 2013.

Walk-in clinics are often not staffed by physicians but nurses, and so are unable to treat the same range of conditions as regular doctors and hospitals. Other disadvantages may include the urgency to make the patient's visit as quick as possible in order to reduce the long waiting list of walk-ins at the clinic, which may fail to fulfill the purpose of the visit.

== Services ==
Urgent care clinics are usually led by physicians. The much smaller category of retail clinics, which are stand-alone clinics located inside large retail stores or shopping malls, tend to be headed by nurse practitioners. The significantly higher price for an urgent care visit compared to a retail clinic visit is largely attributed to this difference in staffing.

All types of walk-in clinics provide basic medical services, such as routine vaccinations, evaluation of cold and flu symptoms, and treatment for less severe physical injuries. Urgent care centers normally provide more services, such as X-ray testing for suspected pneumonia or broken bones.

Access to the patient's regular medical records depends on the agreements that the clinic has with other organizations. For example, a walk-in clinic that is part of or affiliated with a hospital or larger clinic may have full access to all the medical records belonging to the larger institution, while an independent walk-in clinic may not have to access any patient records except those related to previous visits to that walk-in clinic. This lack of access can prevent healthcare providers from recognizing chronic problems.

== Major companies in the United States ==
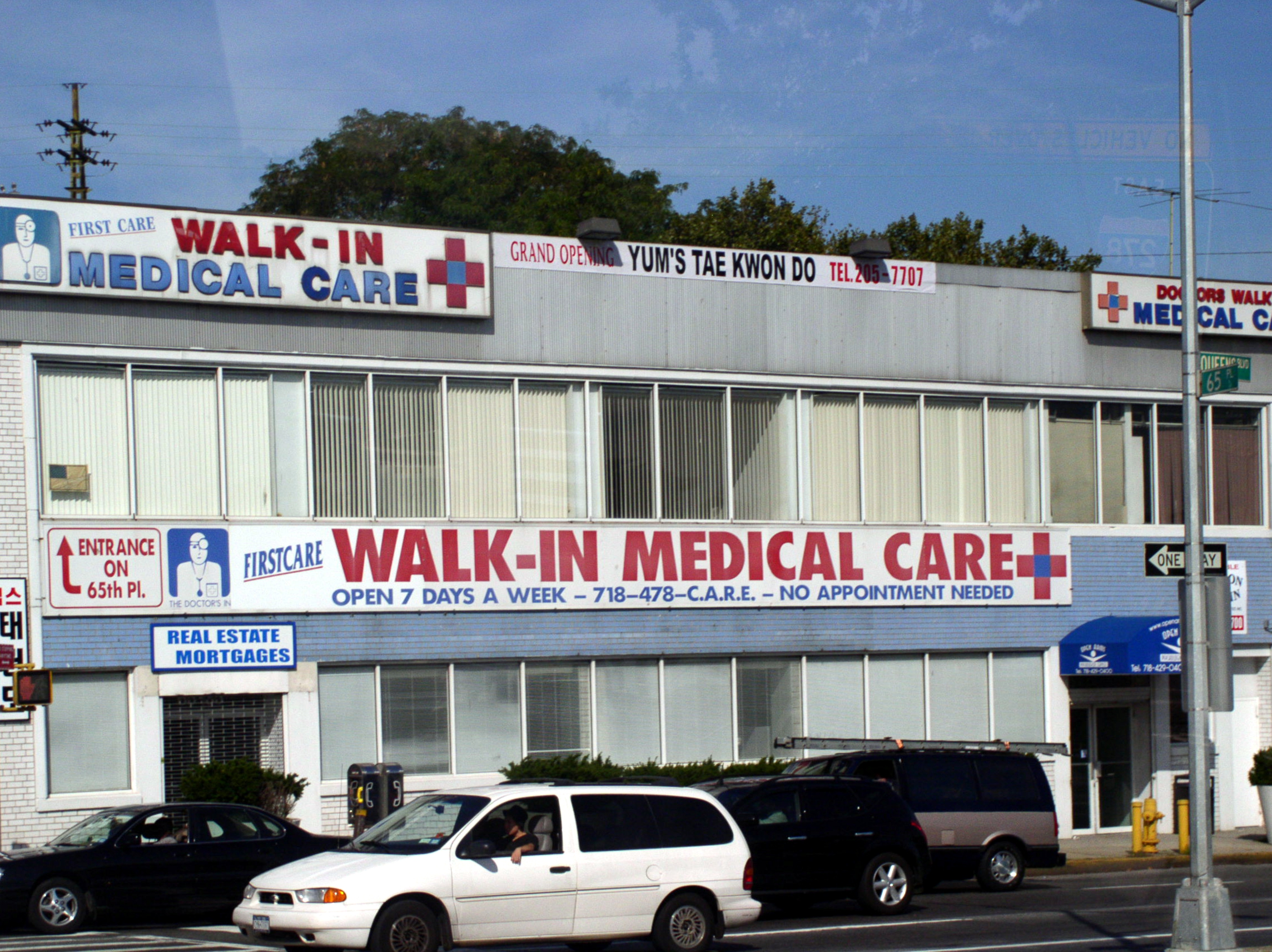
Walk-in Medical Care Center in New York City, Queens Boulevard

The 100 largest urgent care operators in the United States run approximately 25% of the locations under their banners

Company brand	# of clinics
CVS MinuteClinic	837
Concentra	521
Healthcare Clinic at Walgreens	413
American Family Care (AFC Urgent Care)	238
The Little Clinic	220
MedExpress	213
GoHealth Urgent Care	150+
CareNow Urgent Care	150
NextCare Urgent Care	143
CityMD Urgent Care	137
FastMed Urgent Care	104
CareSpot Urgent Care / MedPost Urgent Care	99
Advocate Health Care Clinics	86
Patient First	76
Doctors Care	58
CRH Healthcare (Urgent Medcare, Patients First, Peachtree Immediate Care)	57
Aurora Health Care Clinics	47
Physicians Immediate Care	46
Target Clinic	31

== Opposition ==
The existence of walk-in clinics has met some controversy and opposition. Doctors acknowledge that retail-based clinics are convenient. Primary care doctors say they are trying to build a relationship with their patients, meet them regularly, and follow up on problems. These clinics interfere with that relationship and can potentially fragment health care. There is also the concern that the urgent care clinics fail to provide the primary care providers documents about the visit for the minor emergency. This can further fragment a patient's care. Claire McCarthy, pediatrician, addressed the lack of shared medical records, "Sometimes a minor thing isn't so minor." The American Academy of Pediatrics has recommended that parents do not use retail-based clinics for primary care for their children.
