= SEICAP =

Sociedad Española de Inmunología Clínica, Alergología y Asma Pediátrica (SEICAP), the Spanish Society of Pediatric Allergy, Asthma and Clinical Immunology, is a scientific, non-profit organization, whose aims are to develop and disseminate the knowledge of allergic and immunologic diseases that affect children. Since June 2012 SEICAP has been recognized as a Public Interest Entity. Their field of study includes childhood asthma, rhinitis and conjunctivitis, anaphylaxis, atopic dermatitis, contact dermatitis, urticaria and angioedema, food allergy, drug allergy, allergy to latex, allergy to insect stings, primary immunodeficiency, and other disorders. These conditions are very frequent in children, especially in developed countries, and account for a considerable amount of healthcare spending, which has increased especially since the 1990s.
