= American Muslim Health Professionals =

Islamic organization based in the United States

- Abbreviation: AMHP
- Founder: Arshia Wajid
- Type: Non-Profit organization
- Registration no.: 71-1013651
- Legal status: Active
- Purpose: Empower Muslim Health Professionals to improve the Health of Americans
- Location: United States
- Services: Advocacy; Career & Professional Development; Health Promotion
- Website: www.amhp.us

American Muslim Health Professionals (AMHP) is a national nonprofit organization focused on professional development, health education centered on the unique needs of Muslim Americans, and advocacy for minorities and underserved communities. AMHP is a U.S-based non-profit organization founded in 2004 by Arshia Wajid to empower Muslim health professionals to improve the health of Americans. The organization's headquarters are in Rolling Meadows, IL.

== History ==
Before AMHP was founded in 2004, there was no entity for individuals interested in the intersection of Islam and health. Since the organization’s founding in 2004, AMHP has been at the forefront of public health and policy issues—mobilizing Muslims during the health reform debates at the start of the Obama Administration, championing community-based anti-obesity measures, creating resources for Muslims with disabilities, and elevating the discussion on mental health.

== EnabledMuslim ==
AMHP estimates that there are over 600,000 Muslims living with disabilities in the United States alone. To address the needs of this segment of the population, AMHP launched EnabledMuslim, an online network for community support to help fulfill the physical, social, and spiritual needs of Muslims living with disabilities and of their loved ones. Such a network allows them to actively connect with one another, share information, help each other through common challenges, and prevent them from experiencing isolation. AMHP created this online platform in 2014, after conducting an extensive needs assessment of Muslims living with disabilities and of their loved ones.

Survey respondents living with disabilities asked AMHP to provide the following online resources:

1. A network to connect with other Muslims impacted by similar disability-related needs and challenges. Such a network allows them to actively connect with one another, share information, help each other through common challenges, and prevent them from experiencing isolation.
2. Diverse stories about Muslims living with disabilities. There are numerous Muslims living with disabilities who contribute to our Muslim communities and society at large, and such stories serve as important reminders of that.
3. Guidance on how to raise awareness about disability issues in Muslim families, communities, and settings. Muslims living with disabilities and their loved ones are often their own biggest advocates in their Muslim communities. They need tools to learn how to effectively create change in their communities so they receive the support and inclusion they deserve.

== Mental health ==
On December 2, 2015, AMHP convened young Muslim leaders in Washington, D.C. to discuss youth identity issues and the impact of discrimination on a young adult’s well-being. The event featured Aman Ali, founder of the video series Homegrown Homies, which aims to show the human side of the Muslim community. Redefy Founder and motivational speaker, Ziad Ahmed, also shared his experience countering stereotypes as a young Muslim American. Bilqis Abdul-Qaadir, a record-holding basketball player and founder of Muslim Girls Hoop Too, was also featured at the event. As a high school and college basketball star, Abdul-Qaadir faced discrimination from people who saw her hijab and assumed she would somehow play differently.

== Connecting Muslims to Coverage Campaign ==
One of the major public health issues that AMHP has been addressing over the past few years is reaching the uninsured American-Muslims through a grassroots campaign called “Connecting Muslims to Coverage.” This campaign was initiated in 2015 with the goal of helping American-Muslims obtain health insurance coverage through the open enrollment period of the Affordable Care Act. AMHP has continued this campaign during the past enrollment cycle by hiring a team of community organizers who are working in their respective states to identify local mosques and community-based organizations where they can host enrollment and outreach events.

In March 2014, Rumana Ahmed, the former Executive Assistant to the Deputy Assistant to the President for Public Engagement and Interim Liaison to Muslim-American and Arab-American communities, launched the first National Muslim Enrollment Weekend (NMEW) to raise awareness and encourage the American-Muslim community to enroll in health insurance coverage. Last year, NMEW was held over Martin Luther King Weekend and garnered support from nearly 57 local and national organizations that joined the coalition. The main objective of the weekend was to inform members about the ACA and how they can benefit from it. Partner organizations included Islamic schools, mosques, and prominent community-based organizations.

In 2015, Khadija Gurnah, the former Program Manager for AMHP’s Affordable Care Act outreach and enrollment efforts, was awarded the White House Champion of Change Award for her dedication to connecting Muslims to coverage. Under Khadija’s direction, AMHP launched the first national grassroots initiative of its kind in the Muslim American community. With a limited budget and only seven on-the-ground organizers, AMHP mobilized 81 partner institutions, resulting in thousands of enrollments and newly formed relationships between clergy and civic leaders across religious, ethnic, and racial lines.
