= Urgent Care Association =

The Urgent Care Association (UCA) is a membership organization founded in 2004 and headquartered in Warrenville, Illinois, United States. It is a trade organization representing physicians, clinicians and other professionals working in urgent care centers in the United States and internationally.

== Educational resources ==
UCA offers educational and professional development resources including live conferences, webinars, convention recordings, and self-paced learning content through its online education portal, in addition to providing resources for starting a new urgent care center, the provision of clinical care in the urgent care setting and running a successful urgent care practice.

UCA holds an annual convention in coordination with the College of Urgent Care Medicine. Additionally, UCA publishes Benchmarking Reports on emerging trends in the urgent care industry.

== Journal of Urgent Care Medicine ==
The Journal of Urgent Care Medicine features articles on the clinical practice of urgent care medicine, medical coding, the legal aspects of urgent care, and occupational medicine matters.
