= Canadian Association of Optometrists =

The Canadian Association of Optometrists (CAO) is the national voice of optometry, providing leadership and support to its members to enhance the delivery of eye health and vision care for all Canadians. CAO was formally constituted with the proclamation of a federal act to incorporate the Canadian Association of Optometrists on June 30, 1948.

Optometrists are independent primary health care providers and represent the front line of vision health. Optometrists practice in a range of settings: most work in private practice, while others work in clinics, hospitals, community health centres, corporate optometry, research, teaching, and administration. Recognized at home and internationally as a leading advocate for the profession, CAO is dedicated to providing leadership and support to its +8,300 members (Optometrists, Students, and Optometric Assistants) to enhance the delivery of healthy eyes and clear vision for all Canadians.

== Membership ==
More than 5,900 optometrists comprise the membership of CAO, representing approximately 85% of doctors of optometry (ODs) in Canada.

== History ==
At a meeting in Ottawa on July 7, 1941 six provincial representatives resolved to organize the Canadian Association of Optometrists. The first President was Dr. Herb McClung of Saskatchewan, who had promoted the idea of a national association since 1924.

The association pursued national recognition and CAO was formally constituted with the proclamation of a federal act to incorporate the Canadian Association of Optometrists on June 30, 1948.

== Executive directors ==
- Edward B. Higgins Manager
- James (Jim) Gilmore Executive Director January 1964 – January 1968
- H.G. (Mel) Mellow Executive Director February 1968 – May 1971
- Gregory (Greg) J. Walsh Executive Director June 1971 – October 1974
- Donald (Don) N. Schaefer Executive Director October 1974 – September 1983
- Gérard A. Lambert Executive Director September 1983 – June 1992
- Michael J. DiCola Administrative Officer/Executive Director July 1992 – June 1998
- Glenn Campbell Executive Director June 1998 – July 2013
- Laurie Clement, CEO, July 2013 – August 2019
- François Couillard, CEO, August 2019 – present
