= Urgent care center =

Type of medical clinic

An urgent care center (UCC), also known as an urgent treatment centre (UTC) in the United Kingdom, is a type of walk-in clinic focused on the delivery of urgent ambulatory care in a dedicated medical facility outside of a traditional emergency department located within a hospital. Urgent care centers primarily treat injuries or illnesses requiring immediate care, but not serious enough to require an ED visit. In the United Kingdom, urgent treatment centres are provided by the National Health Service, which decided in 2019 that all areas of England should be served by a network of urgent treatment centres. In the United States, urgent care centers were first used in the 1970s and have since expanded to approximately 10,000 centers across the country.

Urgent care may be categorized as its own branch of medicine, as in New Zealand.

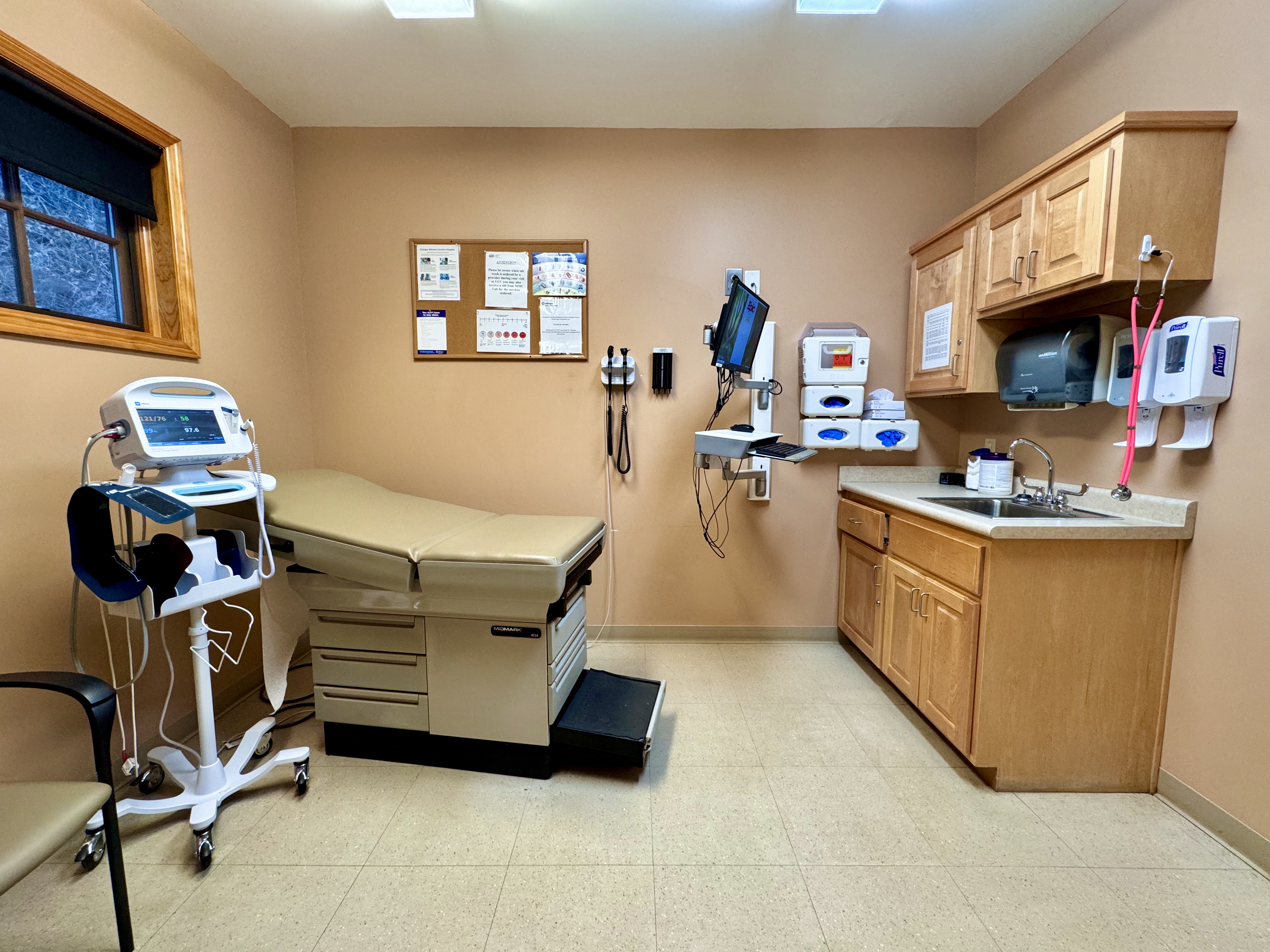
A typical patient exam room at an urgent care clinic

== Description ==
They are intended for the treatment of conditions which require urgent medical attention but are not life-threatening, such as broken bones, minor infections, sprains and strains, cuts, grazes, minor burns or scalds, and bites and stings.

Various media reports have examined the relative benefits of using an urgent care center. Some of the benefits cited include shorter wait times, no need to make an appointment, and a large staff which can handle multiple tasks relatively quickly.

== By region ==
=== United Kingdom ===
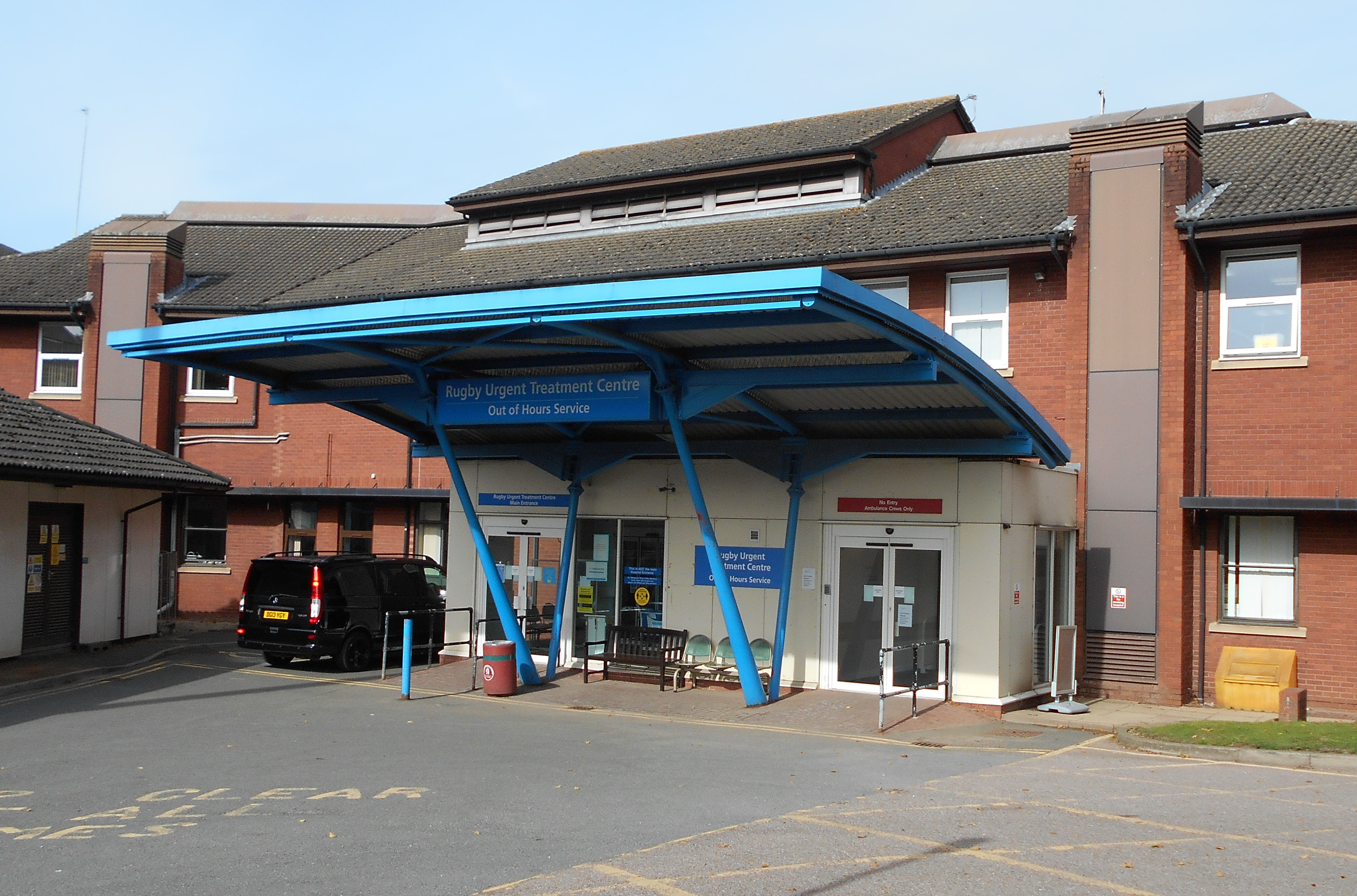
Urgent Treatment Centre entrance at the Hospital of St Cross, Rugby

In the United Kingdom, urgent treatment centres (also called walk-in centres or minor injury units) are provided by the National Health Service, not on a commercial basis. They are intended for the treatment of conditions which require urgent medical attention but are not life-threatening, such as broken bones, minor infections, sprains and strains, cuts, grazes, minor burns or scalds, and bites and stings.

Urgent treatment centres are not often located in retail facilities and are generally on hospital sites where they take patients who may not need the facilities of the Accident and Emergency Department, but can be transferred from one to the other if necessary. They are intended to divert patients from the A&E departments, which are under great pressure. Some centres are run by hospital trusts. Royal Devon and Exeter NHS Foundation Trust took over Exeter's NHS walk-in centre from Northern Devon Healthcare NHS Trust in March 2018. It also runs Honiton Minor Injury Unit. The trust said they were more able to share skills and expertise and work as one team with the A&E department. The Care Quality Commission reported in June 2018 that about 10% of the urgent care services in England require improvement. They inspected 64 urgent care and walk-in centres.

==== Use of urgent treatment centre ====
There has been a lack of public information about what services are provided and when. It has been pointed out that people need guidance to overcome an historic reliance on accident and emergency. Different words—walk-in centres, minor injury units and urgent care centres—have been used for similar facilities, but without the public understanding what exactly was on offer. In Blackpool, the Walk-in centre and the Same Day Health Centre were both renamed Urgent Treatment Centres in August 2018. This was said to be a clear and comprehensive offer to patients. These urgent treatment centres were "open for at least 12 hours a day, every day of the week, every week of the year, including bank holidays—and offering pre-bookable appointments."

About 230 walk-in centres were opened in England in the 2000s. 51 closed between 2010 and 2014. 95 more were closed between 2014 and 2017 according to 38 Degrees. The Yeovil centre, opened in 2009, closed in 2017; the Somerset clinical commissioning group said too many people were misusing the town centre facility because it was convenient for them. It was replaced by an urgent care service at the hospital open from 10am to 6pm on Saturdays and Sundays. Walk-ins in North Ormesby and Eston were closed in 2017 and replaced by the South Tees Access Response service, run by ELM Alliance Ltd, an alliance of local general practitioners (GPs), which offered late night and weekend appointments at four GP surgeries.

NHS England decided in 2019 that all areas of England should be served by a network of urgent treatment centres which must be GP-led, open at least 12 hours a day, every day, offer appointments that can be booked through NHS 111 or through a GP referral, and be equipped with basic diagnostic equipment. They are intended also to relieve the pressure on general practice. The many units with local names and differing levels of service are to be subsumed into them and some will close. The programme is led by the local sustainability and transformation partnerships.

=== United States ===
The initial urgent care centers opened in the United States during the 1970s. Since then, this healthcare sector has rapidly expanded to approximately 10,000 centers across the United States. Many centers were started by emergency medicine physicians, responding to a public need for convenient access to unscheduled medical care. A significant factor for the increase of these centers is significant monetary savings when compared to EDs. Many managed care organizations (MCOs) now encourage or even require customers to use urgent care options. While urgent care centers are usually not open 24 hours a day, 70% of centers in the United States open by 8:00 a.m. or earlier and 95% close after 7:00 p.m.

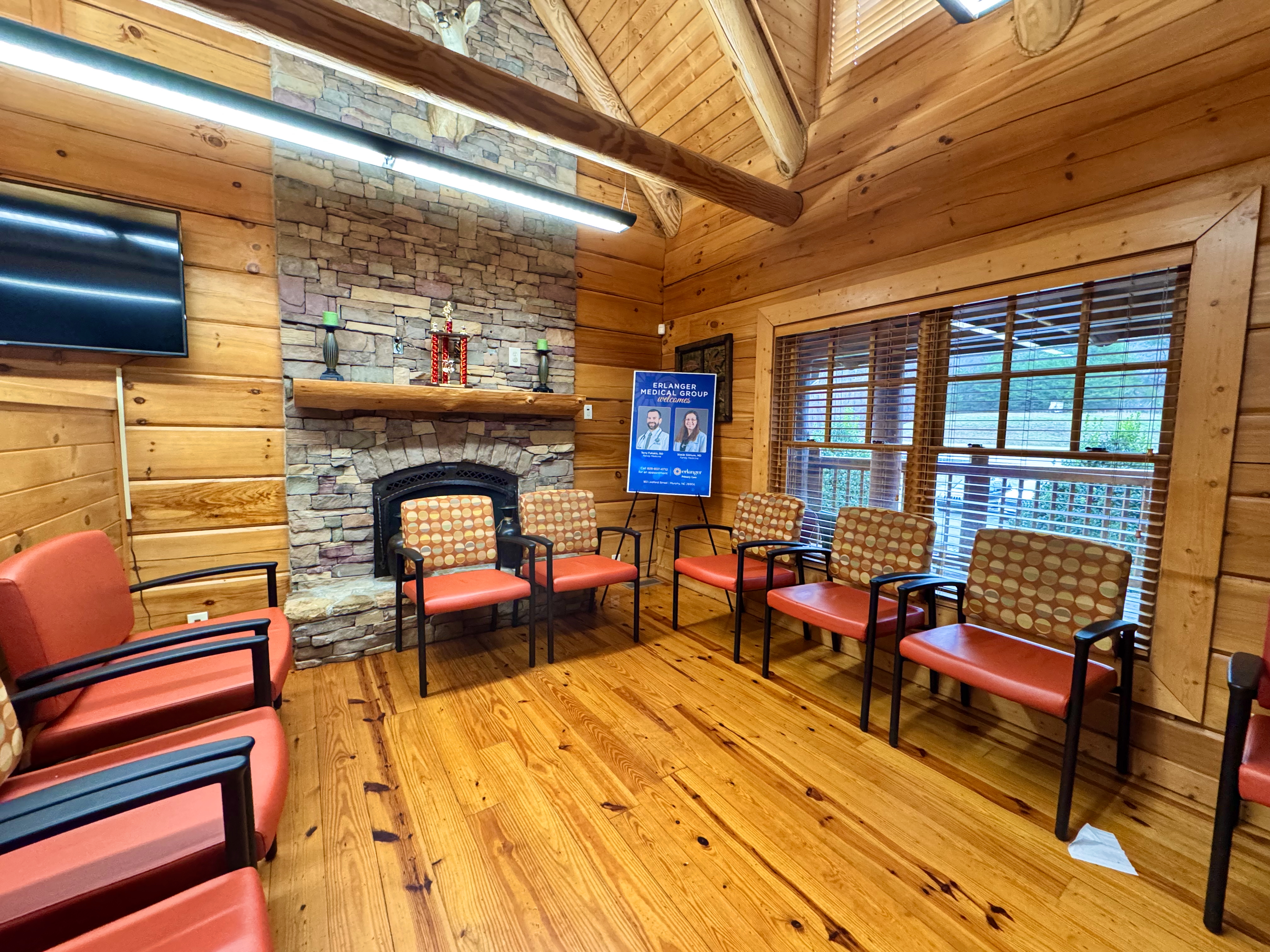
A patient waiting room at an urgent care clinic in North Carolina

As of 2014, the urgent care industry was worth an estimated $14.5 billion.

==== Distribution ====
In 2014, US communities with non-hospital-based UCCs were mainly urban, located in areas with higher income levels and higher levels of private insurance. Kaissi et al., considered local multi-hospital systems in Florida, Maryland, Nevada, Texas, Virginia and Washington. In 2012, 50% of 117 hospital-based "clusters" included either UCCs, retail clinics, or both. 57% of systems in Washington operated an UCC, compared to 36% of systems in Washington, while systems in Florida had the largest share of UCCs (17.6%). Authors noted unexplained state-by-state variation in hospital system partnership with UCC and retail clinic models.

==== Demographics of UCC patients ====
Corwin, et al., considered Medicare beneficiaries presenting to an UCC emergency department (ED) or physicians office with upper respiratory or urinary tract infections, bronchitis, sprains or contusions, and back or arthritic pain, in 2012. Patients who presented to an ED were more likely to be female (67% of ED presentations) compared to those who presented to a UCC or physicians office (65% and 64% respectively). Patients who presented to an UCC were significantly more likely to be aged over 85 (27%, compared to 15% of physicians office presentations, and 13% of ED presentations) or Black (11%, compared to 6% of physicians office presentations, and 4% of ED presentations). In 2014, 3.1% of family physicians in the United States worked primarily in UCCs, with a male:female ratio of workforce is 6:7, and an urban:rural ratio of 2:1. This compares to 3.6% of family physicians working primarily in emergency care, with a male:female ratio of 5:3 and urban:rural ratio approaching 1:2.

==== Organizations and certification ====
The Urgent Care Association (UCA) is an organization founded in 2004 to provide resources and training for the industry. The UCA also publishes the Journal of Urgent Care Medicine (JUCM).

The American Board of Urgent Care Medicine (ABUCM) was founded in 1997 to provide certification to urgent care physicians.

==== Staffing and services ====
Urgent care centers are not emergency departments and as such do not offer surgical services, particularly invasive surgical procedures (more than cutaneous or subcutaneous procedures—those involving body organs and organ parts, and/or deep penetration of deep fascia, tendons, ligaments, bursae, joints, muscles, or bones), any procedures requiring the use of regional or general anesthesia (more than topical local anesthesia), those procedures requiring a full operating room or suite, having lengthy recovery times, or requiring more than the level of imaging or specialists available at the center.

An estimated 13.7 to 27.1 percent of all emergency department care could be administered at an urgent care center, generating a potential cost savings of approximately $4.4 billion annually, according to a 2010 study in Health Affairs.

=== New Zealand ===
The Royal New Zealand College of Urgent Care (RNZCUC), was founded in 1995 originally as the Accident and Medical Practitioners Association (AMPA), and presently provides certification for urgent care physicians in New Zealand. The RNZCUC has branch of medicine recognition with the Medical Council of New Zealand (MCNZ), and is recognised as a separate branch of medicine in New Zealand. It is the 13th largest college in New Zealand by membership (of the 34 recognised by the MCNZ).
