= AdventHealth Orlando =

- AdventHealth

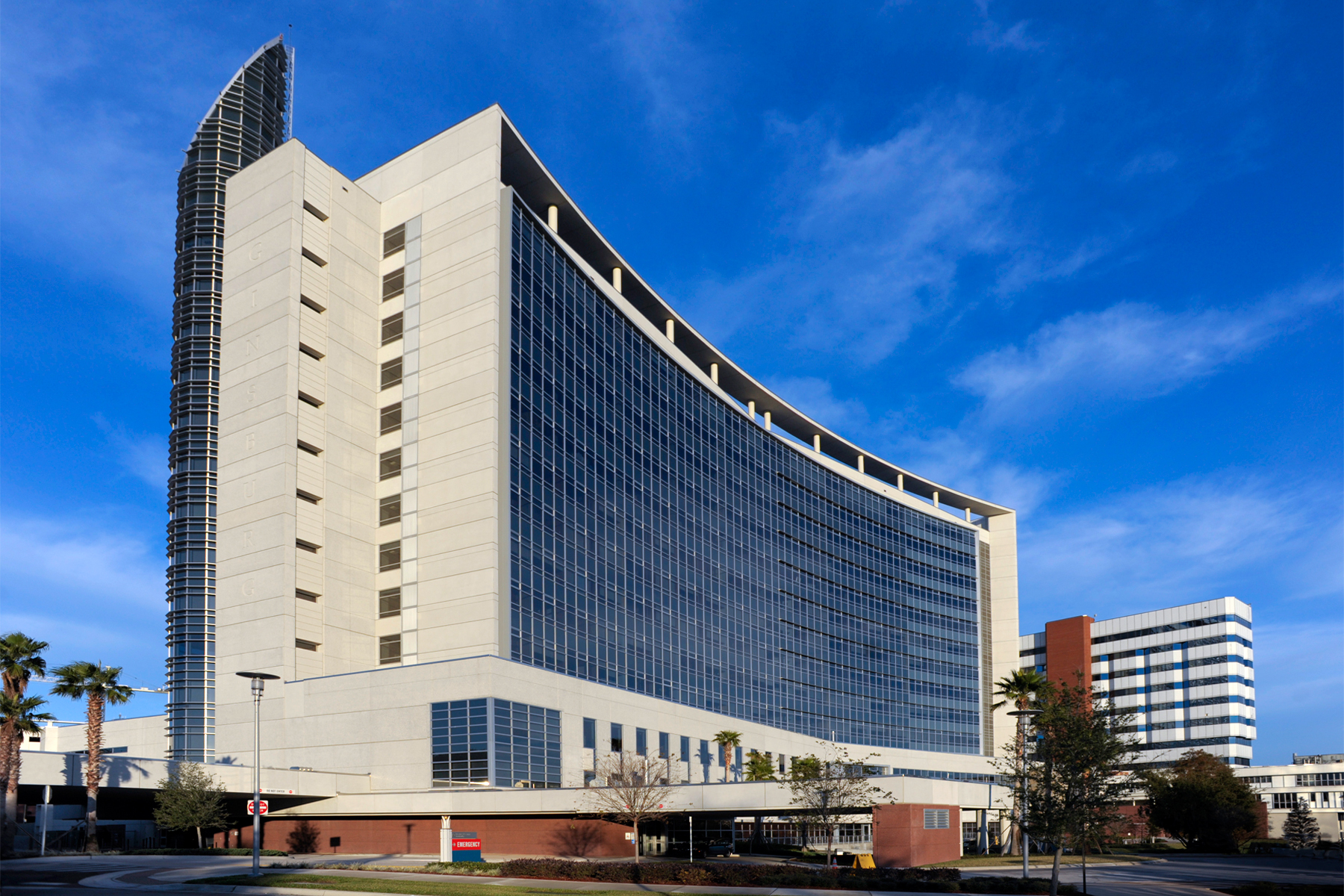
- Florida Hospital Orlando in 2010, before it rebranded in 2019 to AdventHealth Orlando

Geography
- Location: 601 East Rollins Street, Orlando, Florida, United States
- Coordinates: 28°34′31″N 81°22′12″W

Organization
- Care system: Private hospital
- Type: General hospital and Teaching hospital
- Religious affiliation: Seventh-day Adventist Church
- Affiliated university: AdventHealth University

Services
- Standards: DNV Healthcare
- Emergency department: Yes
- Beds: 1,322

Helipads
- Helipad: (FAA LID: 37FA)
Number	Length		Surface
Number	ft	m	Surface
H1	100 × 42	30 × 13	concrete

History
- Former names: Florida Sanatorium; Florida Hospital Orlando
- Opened: 1908

Links
- Website: www.adventhealth.com/hospital/adventhealth-orlando
- Lists: Hospitals in Florida

Adventist Health System-Sunbelt, Inc. (doing business as AdventHealth Orlando) is a non-profit hospital campus in Orlando, Florida, United States owned by AdventHealth and is the largest in the hospital network. The medical facility is a tertiary, research, statutory teaching hospital, psychiatric hospital, burn center, and comprehensive stroke center that has multiple specialities. It is the second largest hospital in Florida and the largest in central Florida. AdventHealth Orlando is the 3rd largest hospital in the United States in 2023. AdventHealth Orlando is the very first Seventh-day Adventist hospital in Florida owned by the hospital network. The medical facility is recognized by the state as being part of the Baker Act.

In 2011, a murder-suicide took place at the hospital when a transplant physician was murdered by one of his patients.

== History ==
=== 1908-1986 ===
In 1908, Seventh-day Adventists purchased a tuberculosis sanatorium for $9,000 that was for sale. The facility was on a former 72 acres (29 ha) farm, it was located between Estelle lake and Winyah lake in Formosa north of Orlando. In October 1908, Florida Sanatorium opened with 20 beds, two physicians, one nurse, dairy cattle and four patients.

In 1912, a building made of concrete was constructed across the farmhouse. In 1918, a third story was added to the sanitarium increasing the capacity to 60 beds. In 1925, a new wing was constructed connecting the farmhouse to the concrete building.

Beginning in the 1940s, Florida Sanatorium and Hospital began using modern medicines, molecular diagnostic and surgical procedures. On May 12, 1941, a new hospital unit opened with an operating theater, nursery and rooms for 20 patients.

In 1970, Florida Sanatorium and Hospital changed its name to Florida Hospital Orlando. In 1986, Florida Hospital Orlando bought a helicopter and it was stationed at the hospital.

=== 2007-2019 ===
In October 2005, the hospital had a groundbreaking for a fifteen-story tower and it topped off one month later. The tower was being built for $260 million, it would open with 200 patient rooms and later expand to 440. One floor will be completely occupied by sixteen medical laboratories. The new larger emergency department will have seventy-two exam rooms, doubling the capacity of the emergency department. The old emergency would be renovated for radiology. In mid July 2007, the Ginsburg Family Foundation donated $20 million to the hospital for its heart institute. In December 2008, the Ginsburg Tower opened for $255 million saving the hospital $5 million.

In late November 2015, Florida Hospital Orlando called the Florida Department of Health after a patient at the Ginsburg Tower tested positive for Legionella. They tested the water at the Ginsburg Tower, and on January 13 the tests confirmed that the bacteria was in the water. It was revealed that the bacteria that the patient had was different from the hospital. The hospital hired Chicago-based Phigenics to flush the water system at Ginsburg Tower, which took a couple of weeks to do.

In late June 2018, Florida Hospital Orlando announced that it expanded its coronary care unit by adding eight beds. On October 4, the hospital announced that it would expand its Cardiovascular Institute after receiving a $3 million donation from the Ginsburg Family Foundation. On January 2, 2019, Florida Hospital Orlando changed its name to AdventHealth Orlando. On March 11, the hospital filed with Orlando to expand the emergency department at the Ginsburg Tower by 45,000 square foot (4,200 m^{2}). Also in March, Brett Spenst became president and CEO of the hospital.

=== 2020-present ===
In early October 2020, Rob Deininger was named president and CEO of AdventHealth Orlando. He took office on November 9. During the COVID-19 pandemic the medical facility had 1,400 beds. On October 21, a 1,800 solar panel carport was installed at AdventHealth Orlando on top of its McRae parking garage. It will charge over thirty-two electric cars, create 1.3 million kilowatts yearly, and save over $4.6 million in energy costs. On December 16, frontline workers at the hospital received the Pfizer-BioNTech COVID-19 vaccine.

On January 1, 2021, all hospitals were required to have their chargemaster on its website by the Centers for Medicare & Medicaid Services. In early February 2023, almost all of the AdventHealth hospitals had their chargemaster on their website, including AdventHealth Orlando.

On October 12, 2021, a construction crane collapsed onto a parking garage that was being built at the AdventHealth Orlando campus. One construction worker was taken to Orlando Regional Medical Center with traumatic injuries.

On May 13, 2022, AdventHealth Orlando bought a second helicopter, they are both stationed in a 7,000 square foot (650 m^{2}) hangar that is being leased at Orlando Executive Airport. It also renovated an adjacent 10,000 square foot (930 m^{2}) building to be used as an office for the Flight 1 programme and a simulator for training the flight and ground rescue fleets. The renovations were finished in 2023. The reason for adding a second helicopter in 2022, Flight 1 transported 1,000 patients to AdventHealth hospitals in Florida in 2021.

In early February 2023, Loma Linda University School of Medicine partnered with AdventHealth Orlando, which will allow students to complete their third and fourth years at the hospital. In the spring of 2024, the hospital hired Jefrë to make artwork for the parking garage of AdventHealth Innovation Tower.

In early May 2025, AdventHealth Orlando announced that it would add a fourteen-story patient and surgical tower to its campus for about $660 million. It will have twenty-four operating theaters, endoscopy, and 440 inpatient beds. It will open with 120 beds and ten operating theatres. It will have shell space for another 320 beds. The tower will increase the number of licensed beds at AdventHealth Orlando to 1,795. It was designed by HuntonBrady Architects and will be built by Brasfield & Gorrie. The hospital will be hiring more physicians and nurses, due to the growth of the Orlando metropolitan area. It will also be purchasing new technology, adding more programs and services. All total it will cost the hospital $1 billion. The hospital campus has 9,500 employees and will add about another 1,000.

In late June, Abel Biri was named president and CEO of AdventHealth Orlando, after Rob Deininger became president and CEO of AdventHealth East Florida Division.

On March 5, 2026, construction began on 2 acres (0.81 ha) adjacent to the AdventHealth Innovation Tower for a new medical office building, by demolishing retail stores and a one-story medical office building. On March 20, demolition of a Select Specialty Hospital began as part of the expansion of the campus. On April 20, the hospital announced that the AdventHealth Cancer Institute would be moving into the 12-story medical office building once it is completed, it will be attached to the AdventHealth Innovation Tower with a pedestrian bridge. On September 4, construction began for the new patient and surgical tower, by demolishing older buildings at the site.

== Services ==
In late November 2019, AdventHealth Orlando announced that it would stop paying legal guardians to take care of its incapacitated patients and would form a review panel to require two physicians to determine if patients can no longer take care of themselves before having a judge appoint a guardian. It would also require more training for care managers. The changes were made after a law firm did an audit of its campuses in Orange County, Seminole County and Oseola County. It was revealed that the hospital had been over billed by disgraced Rebecca Fierle and had paid her almost $4 million for over a decade.

On December 23, 2020, AdventHealth opened a monoclonal antibody outpatient clinic at AdventHealth Orlando, COVID-19 patients were treated with Casirivimab/imdevimab and Bamlanivimab to keep them out of the hospital. In March 2022, the hospital opened a Post-COVID Clinic to treat patients suffering from Long COVID.

== Affiliated hospitals ==
AdventHealth Orlando has close ties with eight other hospitals in the Greater Orlando area. They are:

- AdventHealth Altamonte Springs
- AdventHealth Apopka
- AdventHealth Celebration
- AdventHealth East Orlando
- AdventHealth Kissimmee
- AdventHealth Minneola
- AdventHealth Winter Garden
- AdventHealth Winter Park

== Awards and recognitions ==
=== U.S. News & World Report ===
U.S. News & World Report recognized AdventHealth Orlando as the best hospital in Greater Orlando from 2009 to 2026. The magazine recognized the medical facility as the number one hospital in Florida in 2019 and 2025. It recognized AdventHealth Orlando as the third best hospital in Florida in 2020 and 2021. The magazine recognized the medical facility as the second best hospital in Florida in 2022 and 2026. In 2023, it tied in second place with UF Health Shands Hospital.

=== The Leapfrog Group ===
The hospital received from The Leapfrog Group a grade A from fall 2013 to fall 2014. It received it again in fall 2017, 2018, 2019, and May 2020. And again in 2021, 2022, 2023, 2024, 2025, and 2026.

The medical facility was recognized by the non-profit organization as a top teaching hospital from 2018 to 2022.

=== Healthgrades ===
AdventHealth Orlando was recognized by Healthgrades with its America's 250 Best Hospital Award from 2019 to 2021. It was recognized with its America's 100 Best Hospital Award from 2022 to 2023. It was recognized with its America's 50 Best Hospital Award from 2024 to 2026.

== Notable people ==
=== Visitors ===
On July 28, 2020, Ron DeSantis visited AdventHealth Orlando; and had a press conference and a roundtable discussion about Florida's response to the COVID-19 pandemic. While at the hospital he praised it for allowing end-of-life visitation. On August 19, 2026, DeSantis had another press conference at the hospital and said this:

"Today, I was proud to announce the winners of this year's Florida Cancer Innovation Fund awards and the opening of applications for next year's awards. This promising initiative now has $70 million in funding for groundbreaking cancer research projects, $10 million more than the previous cycle."

The grants would be awarded to physicians researching a cure for cancer at charities, hospitals and universities.

Also at the press conference was Joseph Ladapo and said this:

"Governor DeSantis and First Lady Casey DeSantis have shown tremendous leadership in making cancer research a priority in Florida, and I'm incredibly grateful for their continued commitment. These investments give researchers the freedom to ask important questions, explore new ideas, and follow the evidence wherever it leads."

And also Shevaun Harris spoke there and said this:

"Governor DeSantis and First Lady Casey DeSantis had a bold vision for what Florida could accomplish in the fight against cancer, and nearly 150 funded projects later, that vision is paying off for families in every part of our state. From rural communities to major cancer centers, Florida patients are getting access to groundbreaking research and life-changing care close to home. This is what happens when a state decides cancer research is not optional. It is a priority."

=== Patients ===
On July 9, 2024, Pat Williams founder of the Orlando Magic was admitted with pneumonia, he later died of the disease eight days later.

=== Employee ===
In 2018, convicted murderer Grant Amato worked at the hospital as a nurse.

== Murder-suicide ==
On May 27, 2011, a murder-suicide took place when physician Dmitriy Nikitin was assassinated in the McCray Garage by one of his patients. The suspect Nelson Flecha from Orange City, Florida later committed suicide with a self-inflicted gunshot wound.

== See also ==
- List of Seventh-day Adventist hospitals
- List of burn centers in the United States
- List of stroke centers in the United States
- AdventHealth station
- AdventHealth for Children
- AdventHealth for Women
