= AdventHealth Winter Park =

- AdventHealth

Geography
- Location: 200 North Lakemont Avenue, Winter Park, Florida, United States
- Coordinates: 28°35′50″N 81°19′38″W

Organization
- Care system: Private hospital
- Type: General hospital and Teaching hospital
- Religious affiliation: Seventh-day Adventist Church
- Affiliated university: Seminole State College of Florida

Services
- Standards: DNV Healthcare
- Emergency department: Yes
- Beds: 373

History
- Former name: Winter Park Memorial Hospital
- Constructed: 1953
- Opened: 1955

Links
- Website: www.adventhealth.com/hospital/adventhealth-winter-park
- Lists: Hospitals in Florida

AdventHealth Winter Park is a non-profit hospital campus in Winter Park, Florida, United States owned by AdventHealth. The medical facility is a tertiary, psychiatric hospital, teaching hospital, burn center, and primary stroke center that has multiple specialties. The hospital has an affiliation with AdventHealth Orlando.

== History ==
=== 1951-1994 ===
In 1951, local leaders were frustrated that they always had to go to Orlando, Florida to see a physician, so they purchased 15 acres (6.1 ha) of the defunct Aloma Country Club. A total of $850,000 was raised by the Winter Park Memorial Hospital Association from the locals. In 1953, there was a groundbreaking for Winter Park Memorial Hospital. In 1955, it opened with 58 beds, two operating theaters, a fracture and a delivery room. That year it treated 2,000 locals and delivered 200 babies.

In 1994, Columbia Healthcare Corporation acquired a half interest in the hospital from the Winter Park Health Foundation.

=== 2000-present ===
In late March 2000, Florida Hospital announced that it planned to purchase Winter Park Memorial Hospital. In early July, it took over the management of the hospital. In 2005, the hospital had 275 beds, and later construction began in May due to the number of babies being born.

In late September 2012, Florida Hospital announced that it would have a building constructed at Winter Park Memorial Hospital for women's health. In early October 2013, the hospital opened Florida Hospital for Women - Winter Park.

In early July 2015, Winter Park Memorial Hospital announced that it planned to add a five-story, patient pavilion tower with eighty beds for $90 million, with shell space for an additional 160 beds. It also announced that it planned to renovate and double its emergency department. In August, both the Winter Park Planning and Zoning Board, and the city commission government approved the construction plans unanimously.

In early November 2016, the cost of the pavilion tower was reduced to $85 million. In January 2017, Brasfield & Gorrie began construction of the mediterranean style pavilion tower, it was designed by RLF Architects. In late March 2018, Winter Park Memorial Hospital changed its mind and decided to open the tower with 140 beds. When the construction at the hospital is complete the number of beds will increase from 320 to 400, and all of the patient rooms will be private. In early July 2019, the first phase of the Nicholson Pavilion opened, and the second phase opened in early October. The pavilion was named in honor of the married couple who donated for its construction.

In late February 2020, construction workers found a time capsule labeled 1953-1963, and when it was opened by the hospital CEO it had newspaper clippings of the early years of the medical facility. In late July, construction began on the emergency department to add thirty-two beds, by increasing its size to 27,000 square foot (2,500 m^{2}). On June 8, 2021, the expanded emergency department opened, by it two new metal sculputure's by Jefrë were installed.

On January 1, 2021, all hospitals were required to have their chargemaster on its website by the Centers for Medicare & Medicaid Services. In early February 2023, almost all of the AdventHealth hospitals had their chargemaster on their website, including AdventHealth Winter Park.

== Partnership ==
In late November 2022, AdventHealth Winter Park and Seminole State College of Florida partnered to create a dedicated education unit to fill the nursing shortage in the state.

== Awards and recognitions ==
The hospital received a grade B from The Leapfrog Group in spring 2013 to spring 2014, and it received it again from spring 2015 to spring 2016. It received a grade A in 2018, 2019, spring 2020; and received it again 2021, 2022, 2023, 2024, 2025, and 2026.

AdventHealth Winter Park was recognized by the non-profit organization as a top teaching hospital from 2020 to 2021.

== See also ==
- List of Seventh-day Adventist hospitals
- List of burn centers in the United States
- List of stroke centers in the United States
