= AdventHealth Celebration =

- AdventHealth

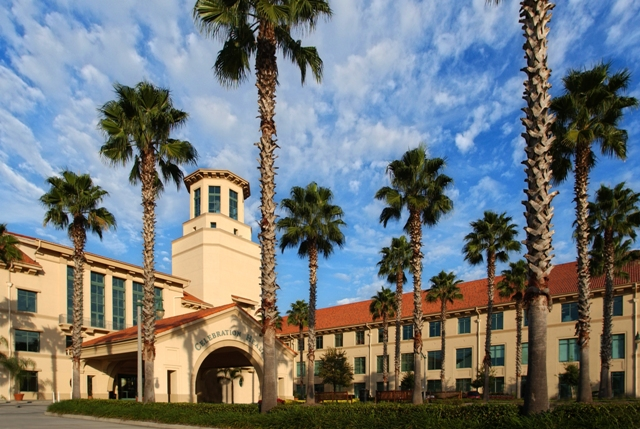
- Florida Hospital Celebration Health in 2009, before rebranding in 2019 to AdventHealth Celebration

Geography
- Location: 400 Celebration Place, Celebration, Florida, United States
- Coordinates: 28.3281884°N 81.54113°W

Organization
- Care system: Private hospital
- Type: General hospital and Teaching hospital
- Religious affiliation: Seventh-day Adventist Church

Services
- Standards: DNV Healthcare
- Emergency department: Yes
- Beds: 357

Helipads
- Helipad: Aeronautical chart and airport information for 77FL at SkyVector

History
- Former name: Florida Hospital Celebration Health
- Opened: October 1, 1997

Links
- Website: www.adventhealth.com/hospital/adventhealth-celebration
- Lists: Hospitals in Florida

AdventHealth Celebration is a non-profit hospital campus in Celebration, Florida, United States owned by AdventHealth. The medical facility is a tertiary, statutory teaching hospital, psychiatric hospital, burn center, and comprehensive stroke center that has multiple specialties. Built in the Mediterranean-style it treats patients from around the world. The hospital has an affiliation with AdventHealth Orlando.

In 2023, AdventHealth Celebration was tied with AdventHealth Kissimmee, as being the second largest employer in Osceola County with 3,565 employees. On January 9, Jair Bolsonaro was a patient at the hospital under a fictitious name.

== History ==
=== 1995-1998 ===
In April 1995, Florida Hospital planned to have a $35 million hospital campus built in Celebration, Florida. The reason why they want to build there was because The Walt Disney Company wanted a hospital. In November 1996, it applied with the Agency for Health Care Administration to have it built. The state agency criticized the cost of the project. On January 13, 1997, the Agency for Health Care Administration rejected Florida Hospital's request to build a hospital at Celebration. It had wanted to move 60 beds from Florida Hospital Kissimmee to Celebration. In early July, the Agency for Health Care Administration rejected Florida Hospital's second request to build a hospital. The reason was given that there was no need for more beds in the area. The Walt Disney Company wanted a hospital in Celebration and chose Florida Hospital to build and operate it. On October 1, Florida Hospital Celebration Health opened with 40 beds.

In January 1998, Florida Hospital won permission to expand the medical facility to a 60 bed hospital. After it made concessions with the Agency for Health Care Administration, Columbia/HCA Healthcare Corporation and Osceola Regional Medical Center.

=== 2002-2019 ===
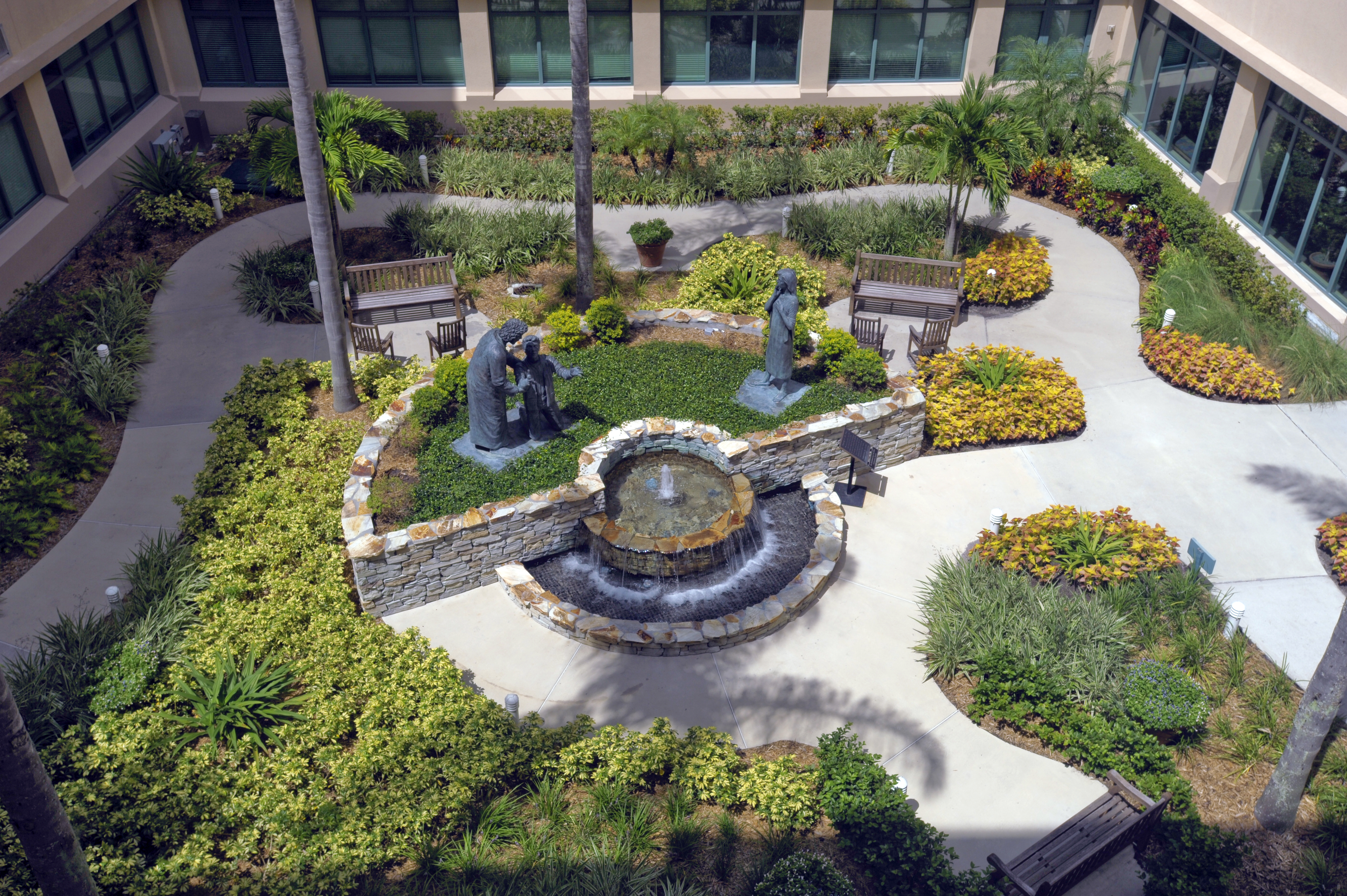
Healing Garden at AdventHealth Celebration

On March 14, 2002, Florida Hospital Celebration Health announced that it had applied with the Agency for Health Care Administration for 60 new beds. In early June, they were instead given permission to add only 40 new beds. On November 11, 2009, construction workers began to build a five-story patient tower at the hospital for a cost of $90 million that would increase the number of patient beds to 120. The total cost of the project increased to $100 million, and another $35 million was added when construction on the Nicholson Center For Surgical Advancement began, the Nicholson Center opened on October 6, 2011. The Nicholson Center was named in honor of a married couple from Winter Park, Florida who donated $5 million for it.

In late April 2011, Florida Hospital Celebration Health announced it would increase the number of beds available from 112 beds to 174 beds. On November 1, the hospital opened its 234,000 square foot (21,700 m^{2}) tower. In late September 2012, Florida Hospital announced that it would have a building constructed at its hospital in Celebration, Florida for women's health. In early October 2013, the hospital opened Celebration Health Women's Institute.

In late April 2017, Florida Hospital Celebration Health announced that it would build a patient tower for $80 million, it would open with 76 beds and later increase to 160. On July 19, 2018, there was a groundbreaking on a 174,224 square foot (16,185.9 m^{2}) five-story patient tower. When at full capacity the patient tower would increase the number of beds of the hospital to 400. On September 5, Florida Hospital Celebration opened its outpatient infusion center for patients with cancer.

On January 2, 2019, Florida Hospital Celebration Health rebranded its name to AdventHealth Celebration. On November 1, AdventHealth Celebration opened a new pediatrics emergency department with 11 rooms.

=== 2020-present ===
On July 30, 2020, AdventHealth Celebration opened a five-story patient tower with 80 beds and at full capacity the tower will have 120 beds. From 2021 to early July 2024, the hospital increased its infection prevention staff to protect patients after they have surgery.

On January 1, 2021, all hospitals were required to have their chargemaster on its website by the Centers for Medicare & Medicaid Services. In early February 2023, almost all of the AdventHealth hospitals had their chargemaster on their website, including AdventHealth Celebration. In August 2021, the hospital purchased a 320 square foot (30 m^{2}) intermodal container from Freight Farms for $150,000. To grow such vegetables as lettuce, kale, bok choy, radishes, carrots and such herbs as dill, cilantro and basil for its cafeteria. In early January 2022, AdventHealth Celebration was one of three hospitals in the United States, to use Memic Innovative Surgery's Hominis Surgical System. It is the first and only surgical robot with human shaped arms.

In early January 2024, the hospital performed the world's first histotripsy on a patient with a kidney tumor. In early April, AdventHealth filed with the South Florida Water Management District to expand AdventHealth Celebration. They planned to add a 44,966 square foot (4,177.5 m^{2}) five-story patient tower at the hospital. This will be the fourth tower for AdventHealth Celebration, making it one of the largest hospitals in Osceola County. Later that year AdventHealth changed its plans for AdventHealth Celebration, to a $340 million, eight-story 302,000 square foot (28,100 m^{2}) tower. With three operating theaters and eighty progressive care beds, this will increase the number of beds to 437. And the tower will have shell space for future expansion. On January 15, 2025, construction workers broke ground on the tower at the hospital.

On June 14, 2025, Vipul Patel medical director at AdventHealth Global Robotic Institute performed the very first prostatectomy via transcontinental telesurgery on a man in Angola.

On April 6, 2026, filed plans with Osceola County for a medical office building and a parking garage. On October 25, Vipul Patel performed the first telesurgery between two hospitals in the United States, by operating on a man with prostate cancer at AdventHealth Minneola.

== Notable patients ==
In February 2012, Oscar Robertson had surgery to remove prostate cancer.

On January 9, 2023, Jair Bolsonaro was hospitalized with abdominal pain under an alias. It was talked about worldwide from the United States, Malawi, Nigeria, India, Thailand, Saudi Arabia, Azerbaijan, Qatar, United Arab Emirates, Philippines, Pakistan, Australia, Albania, France, Spain, Ireland, Greece, Malta, Portugal, Germany, United Kingdom, Dominican Republic, Uruguay, Colombia, Argentina, and Brazil.

On July 28, 2026, Jerry Demings had surgery to remove prostate cancer.

== Data breach ==
From January 2009 to July 2011, Dale Munroe II stole over 12,000 medical records from the hospital, of patients who had been in motor vehicle accidents to Sergei Kusyakov. On July 12, 2011, he was fired for the data breach. His wife Katrina continued the data breach until she was fired on August 2012. On October 10, 2012, Dale Munroe II was indicted for conspiracy and four counts of wrongful disclosure of individually identifiable health information in the United States District Court for the Middle District of Florida. Later on October 22, he was arraigned in court and pleaded guilty. In December, his wife was arraigned in court and pleaded guilty. Sergei Kusyakov paid the couple $10,000 to steal the medical records. On January 7, 2013, Sergei Kusyakov was arraigned and pleaded guilty to the same criminal charges. On January 14, Dale Munroe II was sentenced to 12 months and one day in prison and two years of supervised release.

== Alleged sexual assault ==
On March 25, 2026, nurse Carlos Herrera was arrested and taken to the Osceola County jail for an alleged sexual assault of a woman who had undergone an endoscopy. The alleged sexual assault took place on March 16. The patient told a woman nurse what happened, and the nurse reported the incident to the hospital's security who then called 911. Herrera was put on leave the same day after the incident. During the police interview the patient told them that he put his hand under her hospital gown, and squeezed and massaged her breast. Herrera was charged with abuse of a disabled adult and lascivious behavior, he was released from jail after paying a $30,000 bail bond.

== Awards and recognitions ==
The hospital received from The Leapfrog Group a grade A in fall 2017, 2018, 2019, and May 2020. It again received it in 2021, 2022, 2023, 2024, 2025, and 2026.

AdventHealth Celebration was recognized by Vizient, Inc. as a top performer in its complex care medical center category from 2024 to 2026.

== See also ==
- List of Seventh-day Adventist hospitals
- List of burn centers in the United States
- List of stroke centers in the United States
