= AdventHealth Kissimmee =

- AdventHealth

Geography
- Location: 2450 North Orange Blossom Trail, Kissimmee, Florida, United States
- Coordinates: 28°18′59.872″N 81°24′18.414″W

Organization
- Care system: Private hospital
- Type: General hospital and Teaching hospital
- Religious affiliation: Seventh-day Adventist Church

Services
- Standards: DNV Healthcare
- Emergency department: Yes
- Beds: 282

Helipads
- Helipad: Aeronautical chart and airport information for 85FD at SkyVector

History
- Former names: Kissimmee Hospital and Clinic; Kissimmee Memorial Hospital; Florida Hospital Kissimmee
- Opened: 1941 and 1980

Links
- Website: www.adventhealth.com/hospital/adventhealth-kissimmee
- Lists: Hospitals in Florida

AdventHealth Kissimmee is a non-profit hospital campus in Kissimmee, Florida, United States owned by AdventHealth. The medical facility has an affiliation with AdventHealth Orlando, it is a tertiary, teaching hospital, burn center, and primary stroke center that has multiple specialties. In 1993, the hospital was purchased by Florida Hospital. In 2023, AdventHealth Kissimmee was tied with AdventHealth Celebration, as being the second largest employer in Osceola County with 3,565 employees.

== History ==
=== 1941-2002 ===
In 1941, Kissimmee Hospital and Clinic was founded at the home of physician Raymond Sessions. In 1980, Kissimmee Memorial Hospital opened with 77 beds and increased its size to 120 beds in 1981.

In early 1990, Florida Hospital wanted to purchase Kissimmee Memorial Hospital, from Basic American Medical Inc. of Indianapolis. But by early October, the talks ended due to financial issues. In 1992, Columbia Hospital Corporation acquired the hospital when it purchased Basic American Medical. In late August 1993, Florida Hospital purchased Kissimmee Memorial Hospital from Columbia Hospital Corporation, making it the fifth hospital to be operated by the subsidiary. Also Willow Creek Hospital in Arlington, Texas was sold by Columbia Hospital Corporation to Adventist Health System. Both hospitals were sold for $26.5 million, ending a lawsuit filed by Adventist Health System against Columbia Hospital Corporation.

In late May 2002, the Agency for Health Care Administration approved 10 new beds for the hospital, increasing the number of beds of Florida Hospital Kissimmee to 50. In early May 2007, renovations were completed on the hospital's imaging department, a chapel was added and the number of patient beds was increased to 65.

=== 2013-present ===
On May 14, 2013, Florida Hospital Kissimmee had a groundbreaking ceremony to expand its emergency department from 7,023 square foot (652.5 m^{2}) to 22,560 square foot (2,096 m^{2}) for $7 million. It would be increasing the number of beds from 15 to 35, almost doubling the capacity of the emergency department. It also would be remodeling its waiting room, adding two trauma rooms and treatment rooms for pediatrics. On September 25, 2014, construction of the emergency department was finished.

In early December 2013, the hospital had a second groundbreaking ceremony to construct a 94,000 square foot (8,700 m^{2}), three-story patient tower with 80 private rooms for $60 million. This would double the size of the medical facility. On July 1, 2015, the construction of the patient tower was finished and was open for the public to view. The tower also included a gift shop, chapel, prayer garden, kitchen with a hispanic themed cafeteria and two cardiac catheterization laboratories. And on July 6, patients were officially moved into the new tower.

On August 23, 2018, Florida Hospital Kissimmee announced that it would expand its surgical suite for $84 million, by adding 27,000 square foot (2,500 m^{2}), it will have four new operating theaters and shell space for future expansion.

On May 2, 2019, AdventHealth Kissimmee announced that it would be adding three stories onto its patient tower that was completed in 2015. The 123,000 square foot (11,400 m^{2}) addition with 80 private rooms would be constructed for $84 million, it would be increasing the number of beds to 240. On January 4, 2022, the expanded patient tower opened.

On January 1, 2021, all hospitals were required to have their chargemaster on its website by the Centers for Medicare & Medicaid Services. In early February 2023, almost all the AdventHealth hospitals had their chargemaster on their website, including AdventHealth Kissimmee.

On April 1, 2024, the hospital opened a 30,400 square foot (2,820 m^{2}) floor expansion at its patient tower for $12.3 million. It added 40 private rooms, increasing the capacity of AdventHealth Kissimmee to 282 beds.

== Awards and recognitions ==
The hospital received a grade B from The Leapfrog Group from spring 2012 to spring 2014. It received a grade A in fall 2014 and spring 2015, and received it again from fall 2017 to fall 2018. It again receive a grade B in November 2021, 2022, and May 2023. It again received a grade A in November 2023,2024, 2025, and 2026.

== See also ==
- List of Seventh-day Adventist hospitals
- List of burn centers in the United States
- List of stroke centers in the United States
