= AdventHealth East Orlando =

- AdventHealth
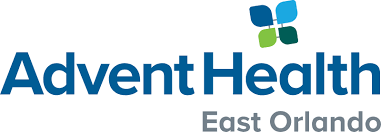

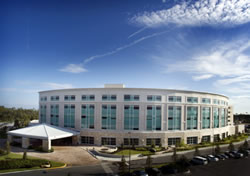

Geography
- Location: 7727 Lake Underhill Road, Orlando, Florida, United States
- Coordinates: 28°32′26″N 81°16′50″W

Organization
- Care system: Private hospital
- Type: General hospital and Teaching hospital
- Religious affiliation: Seventh-day Adventist Church

Services
- Standards: DNV Healthcare
- Emergency department: Yes
- Beds: 295

Helipads
- Helipad: Aeronautical chart and airport information for FD36 at SkyVector

History
- Former names: Orlando Osteopathic Hospital; Orlando General Hospital; Florida Hospital East Orlando
- Opened: 1941

Links
- Website: www.adventhealth.com/hospital/adventhealth-east-orlando
- Lists: Hospitals in Florida

AdventHealth East Orlando is a non-profit hospital in Orlando, Florida, United States owned by AdventHealth. The medical facility is a tertiary, statutory teaching hospital, burn center, primary stroke center and psychiatric hospital that has multiple specialties. The hospital has an affiliation with AdventHealth Orlando.

== History ==
In 1941, Orlando Osteopathic Hospital was founded in a house with fifteen beds. On October 1, 1961, the medical facility opened at a new location as Orlando General Hospital. On December 31, 1990, Florida Hospital acquired Orlando General Hospital, the reason for the merger was because the 197 bed hospital lost $4 million that year.

In early June 2012, Florida Hospital East Orlando announced that it would double the size of its emergency department, by increasing the number of beds from 25 to 65 for $34 million. On April 22, 2013, the hospital had a groundbreaking for its emergency department. On September 10, 2015, Florida Hospital East Orlando opened a pediatric emergency department. On January 2, 2019, Florida Hospital East Orlando rebranded to AdventHealth East Orlando.

On January 1, 2021, all hospitals were required to have their chargemaster on its website by the Centers for Medicare & Medicaid Services. In early February 2023, almost all of the AdventHealth hospitals had their chargemaster on their website, including AdventHealth East Orlando. In early July 2023, AdventHealth filed with Orange County to expand the emergency department and replace the parking lot with a parking garage. In 2023, the AdventHealth East Orlando ER was the busiest in the city. On April 2, 2025, AdventHealth filed with Orange County to add a four-story tower on the hospital's south side and a 1,100 square foot (100 m^{2}) surgery on the north side.

== Awards and recognitions ==
The hospital received a grade A from The Leapfrog Group in fall 2017, 2018, 2019, spring 2020, 2021, 2022, 2023, 2024, 2025, and 2026.

== See also ==
- List of Seventh-day Adventist hospitals
- List of burn centers in the United States
- List of stroke centers in the United States
