= AdventHealth Winter Garden =

- AdventHealth

Geography
- Location: 2000 Fowler Grove Boulevard, Winter Garden, Florida, United States
- Coordinates: 28°31′26″N 81°35′22″W

Organization
- Care system: Private hospital
- Type: General hospital and Teaching hospital
- Religious affiliation: Seventh-day Adventist Church

Services
- Standards: DNV Healthcare
- Emergency department: Yes
- Beds: 130

Helipads
- Helipad: Aeronautical chart and airport information for FA00 at SkyVector

History
- Constructed: March 14, 2019
- Opened: May 3, 2022

Links
- Website: www.adventhealth.com/hospital/adventhealth-winter-garden
- Lists: Hospitals in Florida

AdventHealth Winter Garden is a non-profit hospital campus in Winter Garden, Florida, United States owned by AdventHealth. The medical facility is a tertiary, psychiatric hospital, teaching hospital, burn center, and primary stroke center that has multiple specialties. The hospital has an affiliation with AdventHealth Orlando.

== History ==
In late December 2012, Winter Garden commissioners unanimously approved a medical campus in the city for Adventist Health System Sunbelt Corporation. On September 17, 2013, Florida Hospital had a groundbreaking for a 75,000 square foot (7,000 m^{2}), three-story emergency department by Florida State Road 535. Later the size of the emergency department was changed to 97,000 square foot (9,000 m^{2}), it opened on February 15, 2016 with nineteen beds.

On February 14, 2017, Florida Hospital had a groundbreaking for a 72,000 square foot (6,700 m^{2}) medical office building. On October 3, 2018, Florida Hospital announced that it would have a seven-story, 300,000 square foot (28,000 m^{2}) hospital tower with 100 beds attached to its Florida Hospital Winter Garden emergency department for $200 million. Later plans changed to a five-story tower with eighty beds. On March 14, 2019, there was a groundbreaking for the patient tower. On April 8, 2021, there was a topping out of AdventHealth Winter Garden. On May 3, 2022, the hospital opened to patients. When the campus was completed it created about 1,100 jobs.

On May 15, 2024, AdventHealth announced that it would have three floors added to the patient tower at AdventHealth Winter Garden for a cost of $145 million. The 105,000 square foot (9,800 m^{2}) expansion will include ten postpartum care beds, nine labour & recovery rooms, operating theaters, a progressive care unit with forty beds. It will have a shell floor for forty more beds and also in the future a level 2 neonatal intensive care unit will be added. In early June, the city unanimously approved the expansion of the tower at the hospital, the construction would be supervised by Earl Swensson Associates. Construction would begin in the summer and when completed 100 jobs will be added to the hospital.

In early February 2025, AdventHealth announced that it would have a three-story, 69,183 square foot (6,427.3 m^{2}) medical office building constructed to treat cancer. In late April, construction began on a smaller 60,000 square foot (5,600 m^{2}) facility for $43.2 million. In July, the expansion of the tower was topped out.

The reason why AdventHealth Winter Garden is having two construction projects taking place at the same time, is because of the rapid population growth of the city and Orange County, Florida. Another reason so patients do not have to travel ten to twenty miles to see a doctor.

On February 13, 2026, the cancer institute was topped out. On July 17, there was a grand opening for AdventHealth Cancer Institute at Winter Garden, and ten days later it began to treat patients. On August 24, the hospital opened The Baby Place.

== Awards and recognitions ==
AdventHealth Winter Garden received a grade A from The Leapfrog Group in November 2024, 2025 and 2026. The hospital was recognized by Vizient, Inc. as a top performer in its community hospital category in 2025 and 2026.

== See also ==
- List of Seventh-day Adventist hospitals
- List of burn centers in the United States
- List of stroke centers in the United States
