= AdventHealth Apopka =

- AdventHealth

Geography
- Location: 2100 Ocoee Apopka Road, Apopka, Florida, United States
- Coordinates: 28.6492°N 81.5402°W

Organization
- Care system: Private hospital
- Type: General hospital and Teaching hospital
- Religious affiliation: Seventh-day Adventist Church

Services
- Standards: DNV Healthcare
- Emergency department: Yes
- Beds: 158

Helipads
- Helipad: Aeronautical chart and airport information for 1FA2 at SkyVector

History
- Former names: North Orange Memorial Hospital; Florida Hospital Apopka
- Constructed: 1964 and March 31, 2015
- Opened: 1967 and December 13, 2017

Links
- Website: www.adventhealth.com/hospital/adventhealth-apopka
- Lists: Hospitals in Florida

AdventHealth Apopka is a non-profit hospital campus in Apopka, Florida, United States owned by AdventHealth. The medical facility is a tertiary, statutory teaching hospital, burn center, psychiatric hospital and primary stroke center that has multiple specialties.

== History ==
In 1959, Apopka created a tax district to raise money for a hospital. In 1964, construction began on the medical facility. In 1967, North Orange Memorial Hospital opened. In 1975, the 50 bed medical facility was purchased by Adventist Health System for $1 million.

In November 2013, Adventist Health System purchased 38 acres (15 ha) from the Orlando-Orange County Express Authority for $2.9 million, for a new campus to replace the downtown location of Florida Hospital Apopka. On March 31, 2015, there was a groundbreaking for the new campus on 70 acres (28 ha) by Florida State Road 414 and Florida State Road 429. The campus was expected to create about 1,000 new jobs, and also to treat 100 patients a day after its completion. The seven-story hospital with 120 beds and its four-story medical office building was being constructed for $203 million. On December 13, 2017, ambulances moved 18 patients to the new campus, the hospital was expected to boost the economy on the cities west side. Originally Florida Hospital Apopka was going to be constructed with 80 beds for $23 million.

In January 2018, hospital announced that it would begin construction in summer to add 80 beds and that it was expected to be finished in late 2019. On January 2, 2019, Florida Hospital Apopka rebranded to AdventHealth Apopka.

On January 1, 2021, all hospitals were required to have their chargemaster on its website by the Centers for Medicare & Medicaid Services. In early February 2023, almost all of the AdventHealth hospitals had their chargemaster on their website, including AdventHealth Apopka.

In April 2023, construction was completed on a 13,489 square foot (1,253.2 m^{2}) infusion center, that cost $8 million to build, it began treating patients in May. On October 11, the hospital began a $26.3 million expansion onto a fifth floor shell space to increase its capacity from 120 beds to 158. On April 29, 2024, there was a grand opening of the fifth floor.

== Awards and recognitions ==
The hospital received a grade A from The Leapfrog Group in fall 2017, 2018, 2019, spring 2020, 2021; it received a grade B in 2022, and spring 2023. It received again a grade A in fall 2023, 2024, 2025, and 2026.

The medical facility was recognized by the non-profit organization from 2018 to 2020.

== See also ==
- List of Seventh-day Adventist hospitals
- List of burn centers in the United States
- List of stroke centers in the United States
