= AdventHealth for Women =

- AdventHealth

Geography
- Location: 601 East Rollins Street, Orlando, Florida, United States
- Coordinates: 28°34′30″N 81°22′13″W

Organization
- Care system: Private hospital
- Type: General hospital
- Religious affiliation: Seventh-day Adventist Church

Services
- Emergency department: Yes
- Beds: 330

History
- Former name: Florida Hospital for Women
- Constructed: January 9, 2013
- Opened: January 24, 2016

Links
- Website: www.adventhealth.com/adventhealth-women
- Lists: Hospitals in Florida

AdventHealth for Women is a non-profit hospital in Orlando, Florida, United States that is located on the AdventHealth Orlando campus.

== History ==
In late September 2012, Florida Hospital announced that it would have a building constructed at Florida Hospital Orlando for women's health. On January 9, 2013, Florida Hospital had a groundbreaking for a 12-story, 400,000 square foot (37,000 m^{2}) women's hospital, at Florida Hospital Orlando for $210 million. They wore pink hard hats and pink stethoscopes, while they used pink shovels to dig into soil dyed pink. Brasfield & Gorrie was hired to build the women's hospital and HKS, Inc. was hired to design it. In early November 2014, there was a topping out for Florida Hospital for Women. On January 11, 2016, there was a ribbon cutting ceremony and it began treating patients on January 24. AdventHealth for Women was expected to treat 20,000 women in its first year.

Florida Hospital for Women was constructed in two phases: Phase one for young women, babies, for heart and breast cancer treatment. Phase two for oncology, surgery and neurological intensive care unit.

== The babies ==
To celebrate the release of Star Wars: The Rise of Skywalker, the hospital dressed up the babies as characters from the film series, such as BB-8, Han Solo, Princess Leia, Luke Skywalker, Rey, and Yoda.

== Visitors ==
On Star Wars Day the 501st Legion came to the hospital, and visited patients dressed as Darth Vader and stormtroopers.

== Wedding ==
In early May 2024, a pregnant woman got married at the hospital in a bed sheet, while she was in induced labor due to respiratory syncytial virus.

== Alleged sexual assault ==
On March 4, 2026, nurse Abedinecho Katue was arrested and taken to the Orange County jail for an alleged sexual assault of a disabled woman who was using a bedpan. The patient told police that he put his finger in her vagina, and give her morphine without her permission to keep her quiet. The alleged crime took place on January 26, 2025, and after hearing about it the hospital sent him home. He faces charges of sexual battery, lascivious behaviour and molestation. Katue pleaded not guilty and his bail bond was set at $75,0000. After his arrest the Kenyan embassy was notified, and they provided him with a lawyer. He was later released after paying $7,500, the money was raised online for him by Kenyan Americans.

== See also ==
- List of Seventh-day Adventist hospitals
