= Connected City, Florida =

Planned community in Florida, U.S.

The Connected City is a planned community with the intention of having a fiber network infrastructure in place that houses Gigabit internet service. It is located in Wesley Chapel, Florida in Pasco County. The community will include a Saint Leo University Education Center, a wellness district sponsored by Florida Hospital and Tampa General Hospital, and the first Crystal Lagoon in the United States.

The Connected City Corridor was created by Florida Senate Bill 1216 in May 2015 through a private public partnership between Metro Development Group and Pasco County. This bill states that the chosen area will be used as a 10-year "pilot program" for future further implementation in additional counties.

== Crystal Lagoon ==
The Connected City will have the first crystalline public pool lagoon in the United States. Powered by Crystal Lagoons' technology this is a massive pool that uses environmentally sustainable technologies and minimal chemicals. This public pool lagoon will be 7.5 acres and 4,200 linear square feet in circumference. The average depth will be 8 feet, with a maximum depth of 12 feet. It will have 95% non-Epperson residents, a swim-up bar, watersport activities all for money, not free to residents, beaches, and an island.

== ULTRAFi ==
The Connected City will be completely wired for 1 GB internet speeds through a service called ULTRAFi. This service is created by Metro Development Group and is provided by Spectrum, who beat out proposals from Fiber Internet services such as Verizon Fios and Gigabit Squared. The infrastructure being installed in the Connected City has the capability to be increased up to 10 GB in the future.

== Residential Development ==
The first residential development within the Connected City is the community of Epperson. Upon completion, it will have around 3,000 homes, all of which will feature ULTRAFi technology and access to the Crystal Lagoon. In total, the Connected City is planned to have around 37,000 homes.

== Education ==
The developer of Connected City, Metro Development Group, has partnered with Saint Leo University to create a state-of-the art education center. The center will use ULTRAFi to allow students taking specialized business, computer science, and cyber security online from around the world. The education facility will also house other Universities.

== Healthcare ==
A portion of Connected City will be dedicated to a Wellness District, constructed in partnership with Florida Hospital and Tampa General Hospital. The district will include a hospital, research center, and health care facilities. Telemedicine and at-home health options will also be available for residents to take advantage of.

== Transportation ==
Multimodal transportation networks are currently in development for the Connected City. Self driving and electric vehicles will be provided by Meridian Autonomous Systems. The Meridian Autonomous Vehicle (World Bus by Mobi-Cubed), will be the first self-driving vehicle in the Connected City. Update..8/10/2020. there will be no multi modal transportation.
