= AdventHealth Minneola =

- AdventHealth

Geography
- Location: 1800 North Hancock Road, Minneola, Florida, United States
- Coordinates: 28°36′9″N 81°43′8″W

Organization
- Care system: Private hospital
- Type: General hospital
- Religious affiliation: Seventh-day Adventist Church

Services
- Standards: DNV Healthcare
- Emergency department: Yes
- Beds: 80

Helipads
- Helipad: Aeronautical chart and airport information for 24FA at SkyVector

History
- Constructed: December 14, 2023
- Opened: December 10, 2025

Links
- Website: www.adventhealth.com/hospital/adventhealth-minneola
- Lists: Hospitals in Florida

AdventHealth Minneola is a non-profit hospital campus in Minneola, Florida, United States owned by AdventHealth, it is the first hospital in the city. The medical facility is a tertiary, psychiatric hospital, and burn center that has multiple specialties.

== History ==
On November 1, 2021, AdventHealth purchased 30 acres (12 ha) of land in Minneola, Florida for $21 million. On December 14, 2023, there was a groundbreaking on AdventHealth Minneola that will cost $271 million to build. The four-story 204,000 square foot (19,000 m^{2}) hospital will have 80 beds and will be located by Florida's Turnpike. Brasfield & Gorrie was hired to build the hospital.

On September 5, 2024, there was a topping out of AdventHealth Minneola. On December 7, 2025, there was a grand opening for the hospital, and it opened to patients three days later creating about 500 jobs. An adjacent 60,000 square foot (5,600 m^{2}) medical office building opened in July 2026.

== See also ==
- List of Seventh-day Adventist hospitals
- List of burn centers in the United States
