= List of stroke centers in the United States =

This page presents a list of certified stroke centers in the United States, by certification level, from highest (comprehensive), to lowest (acute). It provides the state, the hospital name, the city, the county, expiration of certification (if available), date cited, and references:

== Comprehensive stroke centers ==
State	Hospital	Settlement	County	Expires	Cited	Ref.
Alabama	Mobile Infirmary Medical Center	Mobile	Mobile		Sep 2015	
Alabama	Southeast Health	Dothan	Houston		01/20/2021	
Alabama	University of Alabama Medical Center (UAB)	Birmingham	Jefferson		Sep 2015	
Alabama	USA Health University Hospital	Mobile	Mobile		Sep 2015	
Alaska	Alaska Regional Hospital	Anchorage			Sep 2015	
Arizona	Banner Desert Medical Center	Mesa	Maricopa		Sep 2015	
Arizona	Banner-University Medical Center (Good Samaritan) - Phoenix Campus	Phoenix	Maricopa		Sep 2015	
Arizona	Mayo Clinic Hospital	Phoenix	Maricopa		Apr 2022	
Arizona	Phoenix Baptist Hospital (Abrazo Central)	Phoenix	Maricopa		Sep 2015	
Arizona	St. Joseph's Hospital and Medical Center/Barrow Neurological Institute	Phoenix	Maricopa		Sep 2015	
Arizona	St. Mary Hospital (Carondelet)	Tucson	Pima		Sep 2015	
Arkansas	Baptist Health Medical Center - Little Rock	Little Rock	Pulaski		Sep 2015	
Arkansas	Sparks Regional Medical Center	Fort Smith	Sebastian		Sep 2015	
Arkansas	University of Arkansas for Medical Sciences (UAMS)	Little Rock	Pulaski		2017	
Arkansas	Washington Regional Medical Center	Fayetteville	Washington		2017	
California	Cedars-Sinai Hospital	Los Angeles	Los Angeles		Sep 2015	
California	John Muir Medical Center - Walnut Creek Campus	Walnut Creek	Contra Costa		Sep 2015	
California	Kaiser Foundation Hospital Emergency Department	Redwood City	San Mateo		Sep 2015	
California	Presbyterian Intercommunity Hospital	Whittier	Los Angeles		Sep 2015	
California	Ronald Reagan UCLA Medical Center	Los Angeles	Los Angeles		Sep 2015	
California	Sacramento Medical Center/Kaiser Permanente	Sacramento	Sacramento			
California	San Antonio Regional Hospital - San Antonio Community Hospital	Upland	San Bernardino		Sep 2015	
California	Stanford Health Care Comprehensive Stroke Center	Palo Alto	Santa Clara		Sep 2015	
California	St. Jude Medical Center Comprehensive Stroke Center	Fullerton	Orange		Sep 2015	
California	UC Davis Medical Center	Sacramento	Sacramento			
Colorado	St. Anthony's Hospital	Lakewood	Jefferson		Sep 2015	
Colorado	Swedish Medical Center	Englewood	Arapahoe		Sep 2015	
Connecticut	Hartford Hospital	Hartford	Hartford		Sep 2015	
Connecticut	The Hospital of Central Connecticut	New Britain	Hartford		Sep 2015	
Connecticut	Saint Francis Hospital and Medical Center	Hartford	Hartford		Sep 2015	
Delaware	Christiana Care Christiana Hospital	Newark	New Castle		Sep 2015	
Florida	Baptist Hospital Miami	Miami	Miami-Dade		Sep 2015	
Florida	Baptist of Pensacola	Pensacola	Escambia		Sep 2015	
Florida	Mayo Clinic of Jacksonville	Jacksonville	Duval		Sep 2015	
Florida	Mease Countryside Hospital	Safety Harbor	Pinellas		Sep 2015	
Florida	Memorial Hospital West	Pembroke Pines	Broward		Sep 2015	
Florida	Boca Regional Hospital	Boca Raton	Palm Beach		Sep 2015	
Florida	Broward Health Medical Center	Fort Lauderdale	Broward		Sep 2015	
Florida	Broward Health North	Pompano Beach	Broward		Sep 2015	
Florida	Cleveland Clinic	Weston	Broward		Sep 2015	
Florida	Delray Medical Center	Delray Beach	Palm Beach		Sep 2015	
Florida	Doctors Hospital of Sarasota	Sarasota	Sarasota		Sep 2015	
Florida	AdventHealth Celebration	Celebration	Osceola	9/28/2027	10/8/2025	
Florida	AdventHealth Daytona Beach	Daytona Beach	Volusia	9/28/2027	9/29/2025	
Florida	AdventHealth Orlando	Orlando	Orange	9/28/2027	12/3/2025	
Florida	AdventHealth Tampa	Tampa	Hillsborough	11/29/2026	11/1/2025	
Florida	Florida Medical Center (campus, North Shore)	Fort Lauderdale	Broward		Sep 2015	
Florida	Gulf Coast Medical Center	Fort Myers	Lee		Sep 2015	
Florida	HolyCross Health	Fort Lauderdale	Broward			
Florida	Jackson Memorial Hospital	Miami	Broward			
Florida	JFK Medical Center	Atlantis	Palm Beach		Sep 2015	
Florida	HCA Florida Kendall Hospital	Miami	Miami-Dade		Sep 2015	
Florida	HCA Florida Largo Hospital	Largo	Pinellas		Sep 2015	
Florida	Leesburg Regional Medical Center	Leesburg	Lake		Sep 2015	
Florida	Morton Plant Hospital	Clearwater	Pinellas		Sep 2015	
Florida	Mount Sinai Medical Center - Miami	Miami	Miami-Dade		Sep 2015	
Florida	Mount Sinai Medical Center - Tallahassee	Tallahassee	Leon			
Florida	North Naples Hospital	Naples	Collier		Sep 2015	
Florida	Palmetto General	Hialeah	Miami-Dade		Sep 2015	
Florida	Sacred Heart Hospital	Pensacola	Escambia		Sep 2015	
Florida	Sarasota Sarasota Memorial Health Care System CSC	Sarasota	Sarasota		Sep 2015	
Florida	St. Mary's Medical Center	West Palm Beach	Palm Beach		Sep 2015	
Florida	Tallahassee Memorial	Tallahassee	Leon		Sep 2015	
Florida	Tampa General Hospital	Tampa	Hillsborough		Sep 2015	
Florida	University of Miami Hospital	Miami	Miami-Dade		Sep 2015	
Georgia	Atlanta Medical Center	Atlanta	Fulton		Sep 2015	
Georgia	Augusta University Medical Center	Augusta	Richmond		07/14/2020	
Georgia	Medical Center Navicent Health	Macon	Macon-Bibb		Sep 2015	
Georgia	Memorial Health University Medical Center	Savannah	Chatham		07/14/2020	
Georgia	Midtown Medical Center	Columbus	Muscogee		Sep 2015	
Georgia	Emory University Hospital	Atlanta	DeKalb		07/14/2020	
Georgia	Emory University Hospital Midtown	Atlanta	Fulton		Sep 2015	
Georgia	Georgia Health Sciences Medical Center	Augusta	Richmond		Sep 2015	
Georgia	Georgia Regents Medical Center	Augusta	Richmond		Sep 2015	
Georgia	Grady Health	Atlanta	Fulton		Sep 2015	
Georgia	Grady Memorial Hospital	Atlanta	Fulton		07/14/2020	
Georgia	JCC Memorial Medical Center	Savannah	Chatham		Sep 2015	
Georgia	Memorial Health - Savannah	Savannah	Chatham		07/14/2020	
Georgia	WellStar Kennestone Regional Medical Center	Marietta	Cobb		07/14/2020	
Hawaii	The Queen's Medical Center (Queen's)	Honolulu	Honolulu			
Illinois	Northwestern Memorial Hospital	Chicago	Cook			
Illinois	Rush University Medical Center	Chicago	Cook		02/15/2021	
Illinois	University of Chicago Medicine	Chicago	Cook		Sep 2015	
Indiana	Ascension St. Vincent Indianapolis Hospital	Indianapolis	Marion		02/15/2021	
Indiana	Community Hospital - Munster	Munster	Lake		02/15/2021	
Indiana	Indiana University Health Methodist Hospital	Indianapolis	Marion		02/15/2021	
Indiana	Riley Hospital for Children	Indianapolis	Marion		02/15/2021	
Indiana	Lutheran Hospital of Indiana	Fort Wayne	Allen		02/15/2021	
Indiana	Miami Valley Hospital	Dayton	Montgomery		02/15/2021	
Indiana	Parkview Regional Medical Center	Fort Wayne	Allen		02/15/2021	
Indiana	St. Vincent Medical Center - Providence	Providence	Johnson		02/15/2021	
Kentucky	Baptist Health Lexington	Lexington	Fayette		01/15/2017	
Louisiana	Ochsner Hospital	New Orleans	New Orleans		Sep 2015	
Louisiana	Tulane Medical Center	New Orleans	New Orleans		Sep 2015	
New Jersey	Cooper University Healthcare	Camden	Camden			
New York	Albany Medical Center	Albany	Albany		2021	
New York	Crouse Hospital		Onondaga		2021	
New York	Good Samaritan Hospital Medical Center		Suffolk		2021	
New York	Maimonides Medical Center	Brooklyn	Kings		2021	
New York	Montefiore Medical Center - Henry and Lucy Moses Division	Bronx	Bronx		2021	
New York	Mount Sinai Hospital - N.Y.		New York		2021	
New York	North Shore University Hospital	Manhasset	Nassau		Sep 2015	
New York	NYU Langone Hospital	Brooklyn	Kings		2021	
New York	NYU Langone Hospital	Long Island	Nassau		2021	
New York	Rochester General Hospital		Monroe		2021	
New York	University of Rochester-Strong Memorial		Monroe		2021	
New York	Upstate Medical University		Onondaga		2021	
New York	Westchester Medical Center		Westchester		2021	
Ohio	University of Cincinnati Medical Center	Cincinnati	Hamilton		Sep 2015	
Oregon	PeaceHealth Sacred Heart Medical Center at RiverBend	Springfield	Lane			
Pennsylvania	Abington Memorial Hospital	Abington	Montgomery		2020	
Pennsylvania	Crozer Chester Medical Center (Upland)	Chester	Delaware		2020	
Pennsylvania	Allegheny General Hospital	Pittsburgh	Allegheny		2020	
Pennsylvania	Geisinger Wyoming Valley Medical Center	Wilkes-Barre	Luzerne		2020	
Pennsylvania	Geisinger Medical Center	Danville	Montour		2020	
Pennsylvania	Hospital of the University of Pennsylvania	Philadelphia	Philadelphia		2020	
Pennsylvania	Lehigh Valley Hospital - Cedar Crest Campus	Allentown	Lehigh		2020	
Pennsylvania	St. Luke's Hospital – Bethlehem	Bethlehem	Lehigh		2020	
Pennsylvania	Temple University Hospital	Philadelphia	Philadelphia		2020	
Pennsylvania	Thomas Jefferson University Hospital	Philadelphia	Philadelphia		2020	
Pennsylvania	UPMC Hamot	Erie	Erie		2020	
Pennsylvania	UPMC Mercy	Pittsburgh	Allegheny		2020	
Pennsylvania	UPMC Presbyterian Shadyside	Pittsburgh	Allegheny		2020	
Pennsylvania	WellSpan York Hospital	York	York		2020	
Tennessee	Erlanger Health System	Chattanooga	Hamilton		Sep 2015	
Tennessee	Fort Sanders Regional Medical Center	Knoxville	Knox		Sep 2015	
Tennessee	University of Tennessee Medical Center	Knoxville	Knox		Sep 2015	
Tennessee	Vanderbilt University Hospital and The Vanderbilt Clinic	Nashville	Davidson		Sep 2015	
Texas	Ascension Seton Medical Center - Austin	Austin	Travis	07/21/2021	11/03/2020	
Texas	Baylor University Medical Center	Dallas	Dallas	07/01/2021	11/03/2020	
Texas	Baylor Scott & White Medical Center	Plano	Denton	06/01/2021	11/03/2020	
Texas	Baylor Scott & White Medical Center	Temple	Bell	08/01/2021	11/03/2020	
Texas	Christus Mother Frances Hospital	Tyler	Smith	06/01/2021	11/03/2020	
Texas	CHI St. Lukes Health Baylor College of Medicine Medical Center	Houston	Harris	07/01/2021	11/03/2020	
Texas	Dell Seton Medical Center at the University of Texas	Austin	Travis	06/01/2021	11/03/2020	
Texas	Doctors Hospital at Renaissance	Edinburg	Hidalgo	05/01/2021	11/03/2020	
Texas	Harris Health System / Ben Taub Hospital	Houston	Harris	12/01/2022	11/03/2020	
Texas	HCA Houston Healthcare - Clear Lake	Webster	Harris	06/01/2021	11/03/2020	
Texas	HCA Houston Healthcare - Kingwood	Kingwood		06/01/2021	11/03/2020	
Texas	The Hospitals of Providence Sierra Campus	El Paso	El Paso	07/01/2023	11/03/2020	
Texas	Houston Methodist Hospital	Houston	Harris	05/01/2022	11/03/2020	
Texas	Houston Methodist - The Woodlands Hospital	Houston	Harris	05/01/2022	11/03/2020	
Texas	John Peter Smith Hospital	Fort Worth	Tarrant	12/01/2021	11/03/2020	
Texas	Medical City - Dallas	Dallas	Dallas	04/01/2022	11/03/2020	
Texas	Medical City - Ft. Worth	Fort Worth	Tarrant	10/01/2021	11/03/2020	
Texas	Medical City - Plano	Plano	Collin	02/01/2022	11/03/2020	
Texas	Memorial Hermann Memorial City Medical Center	Houston	Harris	07/01/2022	11/03/2020	
Texas	Memorial Hermann - Texas Medical Center	Houston	Harris	07/01/2021	11/03/2020	
Texas	Memorial Hermann - The Woodlands Medical Center	Shenandoah	Montgomery	07/01/2022	11/03/2020	
Texas	Methodist Dallas Medical Center	Dallas	Dallas	12/01/2022	11/03/2020	
Texas	Methodist Hospital - San Antonio	San Antonio	Bexar	07/01/2021	11/03/2020	
Texas	Parkland Memorial	Dallas	Dallas	11/01/2021	11/03/2020	
Texas	Seton Medical Center - Williamson	Round Rock	Williamson		Sep 2015	
Texas	South Texas Health System - McAllen	McAllen	Bexar	11/01/2021	11/03/2020	
Texas	St. David's Medical Center	Austin	Travis	12/01/2022	11/03/2020	
Texas	St. Luke's Baptist Hospital	San Antonio	Bexar	09/01/2021	11/03/2020	
Texas	St. Luke's - The Woodlands Hospital	Houston	Harris	07/01/2022	11/03/2020	
Texas	Texas Health Harris Medical Hospital - Fort Worth	Fort Worth	Tarrant	02/01/2021	11/03/2020	
Texas	Texas Health Presbyterian Hospital - Dallas	Dallas	Dallas	05/01/2022	11/03/2020	
Texas	Texas Health Presbyterian Hospital - Plano	Plano	Collin	11/01/2022	11/03/2020	
Texas	University Hospital	San Antonio	Bexar	07/01/2022	11/03/2020	
Texas	University Medical Center - El Paso	El Paso	El Paso	08/01/2022	11/03/2020	
Texas	University of Texas Health East Texas / Tyler Regional Hospital	Tyler	Smith	03/01/2022	11/03/2020	
Texas	University of Texas Medical Branch	Galveston	Galveston	08/01/2022	11/03/2020	
Texas	University of Texas Southwestern Medical Center	Dallas	Dallas	07/01/2021	11/03/2020	
Texas	Valley Baptist Medical Center	Harlingen	Cameron	12/01/2022	11/03/2020	
Utah	St. Mark's Hospital	Salt Lake City	Salt Lake		Sep 2015	
Washington	Harborview Medical Center	Seattle	King		Sep 2015	
Washington	Northwest Hospital and Medical Center	Seattle	King		Sep 2015	
Washington	St. Joseph Medical Center	Tacoma	Pierce		Sep 2015	
Washington	Swedish Cherry Hill	Seattle	King		Sep 2015	
Washington	Tacoma General	Tacoma	Pierce		Sep 2015	
Washington	Virginia Mason Medical Center	Seattle	King		Sep 2015	
Washington	Providence Sacred Heart Medical Center	Spokane	Spokane		Feb 2026	
West Virginia	St. Mary's Medical Center Huntington, West Virginia Cabell Huntington Hospital	Huntington	Cabell		Sep 2015	
Wisconsin	Aurora St. Luke's Medical Center	Milwaukee	Milwaukee		Sep 2015	
Wisconsin	Columbia St. Mary's Hospital - Milwaukee	Milwaukee	Milwaukee		Sep 2015	
Wisconsin	Froedtert Memorial Lutheran Hospital	Milwaukee	Milwaukee		Sep 2015	
Wisconsin	Gundersen Lutheran Medical Center	La Crosse	La Crosse		Sep 2015	
Wisconsin	Wheaton Franciscan Healthcare (St. Francis)	Milwaukee	Milwaukee		Sep 2015	

== Thrombectomy-ready stroke centers ==
State	Hospital	Settlement	County	Expires	Cited	Ref.
Alabama	Baptist Medical Center South	Montgomery	Montgomery		01/20/2021	
Alabama	Birmingham VA Medical Center	Birmingham	Jefferson		01/20/2021	
Alabama	Brookwood Baptist Medical Center -	Birmingham	Jefferson		01/20/2021	
Alabama	Crestwood Medical Center	Huntsville	Madison		01/20/2021	
Alabama	DCH Regional Medical Center	Tuscaloosa	Tuscaloosa		01/20/2021	
Alabama	Flowers Hospital	Dothan	Houston		01/20/2021	
Alabama	Gadsden Regional Medical Center	Gadsden	Etowah		01/20/2021	
Alabama	Grandview Medical Center	Birmingham	Jefferson		01/20/2021	
Alabama	Helen Keller Hospital	Sheffield	Colbert		01/20/2021	
Alabama	Huntsville Hospital	Huntsville	Madison		01/20/2021	
Alabama	Jackson Hospital	Montgomery	Montgomery		01/20/2021	
Alabama	Mobile Infirmary	Mobile	Mobile		01/20/2021	
Alabama	North Alabama Medical Center	Florence	Lauderdale		01/20/2021	
Alabama	Northeast Alabama Regional Medical Center	Anniston	Calhoun		01/20/2021	
Alabama	Princeton Baptist Medical Center	Birmingham	Jefferson		01/20/2021	
Alabama	Providence Hospital	Mobile	Mobile		01/20/2021	
Alabama	Riverview Regional Medical Center	Gadsden	Etowah		01/20/2021	
Alabama	Shelby Baptist Medical Center	Alabaster	Shelby		01/20/2021	
Alabama	South Baldwin Regional Medical Center	Foley	Baldwin		01/20/2021	
Alabama	Springhill Medical Center	Mobile	Mobile		01/20/2021	
Alabama	St. Vincent's Blount	Oneonta	Blount		01/20/2021	
Alabama	St. Vincent's East	Birmingham	Jefferson		01/20/2021	
Alabama	Stringfellow Memorial Hospital	Anniston	Calhoun		01/20/2021	
Alabama	USA Health University Hospital	Mobile	Mobile		01/20/2021	
Florida	Baptist Hospital Pensacola	Pensacola	Escambia		01/20/2021	
Florida	Sacred Heart Hospital	Pensacola	Escambia		01/20/2021	
Georgia	Floyd Medical Center	Rome	Floyd		01/20/2021	
Georgia	Piedmont Columbus Regional	Columbus	Muscogee		01/20/2021	
Georgia	Redmond Regional Medical Center	Rome	Floyd		01/20/2021	
Georgia	St. Francis Hospital	Columbus	Muscogee		01/20/2021	
Indiana	IU Health Methodist - Southlake	Merrillville	Lake		02/15/2021	
Indiana	Memorial Hospital - South Bend	South Bend	St. Joseph		02/15/2021	
Mississippi	North Mississippi Medical Center	Tupelo	Lee		01/20/2021	
New York	Brookdale Hospital Medical Center	Brooklyn	Kings		2020	
Pennsylvania	Albert Einstein Medical Center	Philadelphia	Philadelphia		2020	
Pennsylvania	Bryn Mawr Hospital	Bryn Mawr	Delaware		2020	
Tennessee	Parkridge Medical Center Main	Chattanooga	Hamilton		01/20/2021	

== Primary stroke centers ==
State	Hospital	Settlement	County	Expires	Cited	Ref.
Alabama	Andalusia Health	Andalusia	Covington		01/20/2021	
Alabama	Athens Limestone Hospital	Athens	Limestone		01/20/2021	
Alabama	Baptist Medical Center East	Montgomery	Montgomery		01/20/2021	
Alabama	Brookwood Medical Center Freestanding Emergency	Hoover			01/20/2021	
Alabama	Bryan W. Whitfield Memorial Hospital	Demopolis	Marengo		01/20/2021	
Alabama	Citizens Baptist Medical Center	Talladega	Talladega		01/20/2021	
Alabama	Community Hospital - Tallassee	Tallassee			01/20/2021	
Alabama	Coosa Valley Medical Center	Sylacauga	Talladega		01/20/2021	
Alabama	Crenshaw Community Hospital	Luverne	Crenshaw		01/20/2021	
Alabama	Cullman Regional Medical Center	Cullman	Cullman		01/20/2021	
Alabama	Dale Medical Center	Ozark	Dale		01/20/2021	
Alabama	Decatur Morgan Hospital	Decatur	Morgan		01/20/2021	
Alabama	Decatur Morgan Parkway	Decatur	Morgan		01/20/2021	
Alabama	DeKalb Regional Medical Center	Fort Payne	DeKalb		01/20/2021	
Alabama	D.W. McMillan Memorial Hospital	Brewton	Escambia		01/20/2021	
Alabama	East Alabama Medical Center	Opelika	Lee		01/20/2021	
Alabama	Fayette Medical Center	Fayette	Fayette		01/20/2021	
Alabama	Highlands Medical Center	Scottsboro	Jackson		01/20/2021	
Alabama	Jackson Medical Center	Jackson	Clarke		01/20/2021	
Alabama	Lakeland Community Hospital	Haleyville			01/20/2021	
Alabama	Madison Hospital	Madison	Madison		01/20/2021	
Alabama	Marshall Medical Center North	Guntersville	Marshall		01/20/2021	
Alabama	Marshall Medical Center South	Boaz	Marshall		01/20/2021	
Alabama	Medical Center Barbour	Eufaula	Barbour		01/20/2021	
Alabama	Medical Center Enterprise	Enterprise	Coffee		01/20/2021	
Alabama	Mizell Memorial Hospital	Opp	Covington		01/20/2021	
Alabama	Monroe County Hospital	Monroeville	Monroe		01/20/2021	
Alabama	North Baldwin Infirmary	Bay Minette	Baldwin		01/20/20 21	
Alabama	Prattville Baptist Hospital	Prattville	Autauga		01/20/2021	
Alabama	Regional Medical Center	Greenville	Butler		01/20/2021	
Alabama	Russell Medical Center	Alexander City	Tallapoosa		01/20/2021	
Alabama	Shoals Hospital	Muscle Shoals	Colbert		01/20/2021	
Alabama	St. Vincent's Chilton	Clanton	Chilton		01/20/2021	
Alabama	St. Vincent's St. Clair	Pell City	St. Clair		01/20/2021	
Alabama	Troy Regional Medical Center	Troy	Pike		01/20/2021	
Alabama	UAB Gardendale Freestanding Emergency Department	Gardendale	Jefferson		01/20/2021	
Alabama	UAB Medical West	Bessemer	Jefferson		01/20/2021	
Alabama	Walker Baptist Medical Center	Jasper	Walker		01/20/2021	
Alabama	Wiregrass Medical Center	Geneva	Geneva		01/20/2021	
Alaska	Alaska Regional Hospital	Anchorage				
Alaska	Providence Alaska Medical Center	Anchorage				
Alaska	Providence Neuroscience Institute, Providence Alaska	Anchorage				
Arizona	Tucson Medical Center	Tucson	Pima			
Arkansas	Baptist Health - Fort Smith	Fort Smith	Sebastian		2017	
Arkansas	Baptist Health Medical Center	Little Rock	Pulaski		2017	
California	Memorial Hospital of Gardena	Gardena	Los Angeles			
California	CHA Hollywood Presbyterian Medical Center	Los Angeles	Los Angeles			
Florida	AdventHealth Altamonte Springs	Altamonte Springs	Seminole County	9/28/2027	10/8/2025	
Florida	AdventHealth Apopka	Apopka	Orange	9/28/2027	10/8/2025	
Florida	AdventHealth Carrollwood	Egypt-Leto	Hillsborough	11/29/2026	7/14/2025	
Florida	AdventHealth Dade City	Dade City	Pasco County	6/29/2026	4/2/2025	
Florida	AdventHealth DeLand	DeLand	Volusia	9/28/2027	9/29/2025	
Florida	AdventHealth East Orlando	Orlando	Orange	9/28/2027	10/8/2025	
Florida	AdventHealth Fish Memorial	Orange	Volusia	12/29/2026	5/5/2025	
Florida	AdventHealth Heart of Florida	Davenport	Polk	11/29/2027	11/30/2025	
Florida	AdventHealth Kissimmee	Kissimmee	Osceola	9/28/2027	10/8/2025	
Florida	AdventHealth Lake Placid	Lake Placid	Highlands	5/24/2027	7/29/2025	
Florida	AdventHealth Lake Wales	Lake Wales	Polk	11/29/2027	11/30/2025	
Florida	AdventHealth New Smyrna Beach	New Smyrna Beach	Volusia	6/29/2026	6/30/2024	
Florida	AdventHealth North Pinellas	Tarpon Springs	Pinellas	9/28/2027	11/1/2025	
Florida	AdventHealth Ocala	Ocala	Marion	7/31/2026	9/15/2025	
Florida	AdventHealth Palm Coast	Palm Coast	Flagler	12/17/2026	12/18/2024	
Florida	AdventHealth Sebring	Sebring	Highlands	5/24/2027	10/6/2025	
Florida	AdventHealth Waterman	Tavares	Lake	11/16/2027	11/17/2025	
Florida	AdventHealth Wesley Chapel	Wesley Chapel	Pasco	12/29/2026	12/1/2025	
Florida	AdventHealth Winter Garden	Winter Garden	Orange	9/28/2027	10/8/2025	
Florida	AdventHealth Winter Park	Winter Park	Orange	9/28/2027	10/8/2025	
Florida	AdventHealth Zephyrhills	Zephyrhills	Pasco	6/29/2026	4/29/2025	
Florida	Capital Regional Medical Center	Tallahassee	Leon			
Florida	Jackson South (Jackson Health System)	Miami	Miami-Dade			
Florida	University of Miami - UHealth Tower	Miami	Miami-Dade			
Georgia	Candler Hospital - Savannah	Savannah	Chatham		10/02/2020	
Georgia	Cartersville Medical Center	Cartersville	Bartow		10/02/2020	
Georgia	Coliseum Medical Center	Macon	Macon-Bibb		10/02/2020	
Georgia	Coliseum Northside Hospital	Macon	Macon-Bibb		10/02/2020	
Georgia	Doctors Hospital of Augusta	Augusta	Richmond		10/02/2020	
Georgia	Eastside Medical Center	Snellville	Gwinnett		10/02/2020	
Georgia	Emory Decatur Hospital	Decatur	DeKalb		10/02/2020	
Georgia	Emory Johns Creek Hospital	Johns Creek	Fulton		10/02/2020	
Georgia	Emory St. Joseph's Hospital - Atlanta	Atlanta	Fulton		10/02/2020	
Georgia	Emory University Hospital Midtown	Atlanta	Fulton		10/02/2020	
Georgia	Habersham Medical Center	Demorest	Habersham		10/02/2020	
Georgia	Hamilton Health Care System	Dalton	Whitfield		10/02/2020	
Georgia	Medical Center - Navicent Health (of Atrium Health)	Macon	Macon-Bibb		10/02/2020	
Georgia	Midtown Medical Center	Columbus	Muscogee		10/02/2020	
Georgia	Northeast Georgia Medical Center		Barrow			
Georgia	Northeast Georgia Medical Center	Braselton, Georgia				
Georgia	Northeast Georgia Medical Center	Gainesville	Hall			
Georgia	Northside Hospital - Atlanta	Atlanta	Fulton		10/02/2020	
Georgia	Northside Hospital - Cherokee	Canton	Cherokee		10/02/2020	
Georgia	Northside Hospital - Duluth	Duluth	Gwinnett		10/02/2020	
Georgia	Northside Hospital - Forsyth	Cumming	Forsyth		10/02/2020	
Georgia	Northside Hospital - Gwinnett	Lawrenceville	Gwinnett		10/02/2020	
Georgia	Redmond Regional Medical Center	Rome	Floyd		10/02/2020	
Georgia	Phoebe Putney Memorial Hospital	Albany	Dougherty		10/02/2020	
Georgia	Piedmont Athens Regional	Athens	Clarke		10/02/2020	
Georgia	Piedmont Fayette Hospital	Fayetteville	Fayette		10/02/2020	
Georgia	Piedmont Henry Hospital	Stockbridge	Henry		10/02/2020	
Georgia	Piedmont Hospital	Atlanta	Fulton		10/02/2020	
Georgia	Piedmont Newnan Hospital	Newnan	Coweta		10/02/2020	
Georgia	Piedmont Rockdale Hospital	Conyers	Rockdale		10/02/2020	
Georgia	Southern Regional Medical Center	Riverdale	Clayton		10/02/2020	
Georgia	South Georgia Medical Center	Valdosta	Lowndes		10/02/2020	
Georgia	St. Francis-Emory Healthcare	Columbus	Muscogee		10/02/2020	
Georgia	St. Joseph's Hospital - Savannah	Savannah	Chatham		10/02/2020	
Georgia	St. Mary's Hospital	Athens	Clarke		10/02/2020	
Georgia	Tanner Medical Center - Carrollton	Carrollton	Carroll		10/02/2020	
Georgia	Tanner Medical Center - Villa Rica	Villa Rica	Carroll		10/02/2020	
Georgia	University Hospital - Augusta	Augusta	Richmond		10/02/2020	
Georgia	WellStar Atlanta Medical Center	Atlanta	Fulton		10/02/2020	
Georgia	WellStar Atlanta Medical Center - South Campus	East Point	Fulton		10/02/2020	
Georgia	WellStar Cobb Hospital	Austell	Cobb		10/02/2020	
Georgia	WellStar North Fulton Hospital	Roswell	Fulton		10/02/2020	
Georgia	WellStar Spalding Medical Center	Griffin	Spalding		10/02/2020	
Hawaii	Pali Momi Medical Center	Aiea	Honolulu			
Hawaii	Straub Medical Center	Honolulu	Honolulu			
Hawaii	Wilcox Medical Center	Lihue	Kauaʻi			
Illinois	Franciscan Health - Joliet	Joliet	Will		02/15/2021	
Illinois	John H. Stroger Jr. Hospital	Chicago	Cook		02/15/2021	
Indiana	Ascension St. Vincent - Anderson Regional	Anderson	Madison		02/15/2021	
Indiana	Ascension St. Vincent - Evansville	Evansville	Vanderburgh		02/15/2021	
Indiana	Ascension St. Vincent - Kokomo	Kokomo	Howard		02/15/2021	
Indiana	Baptist Health Floyd	New Albany	Floyd		02/15/2021	
Indiana	Community Hospital Anderson	Anderson	Madison		02/15/2021	
Indiana	Community Hospital East	Indianapolis	Marion		02/15/2021	
Indiana	Community Hospital North	Indianapolis	Marion		02/15/2021	
Indiana	Community Hospital South	Indianapolis	Marion		02/15/2021	
Indiana	Community Howard Regional Health	Kokomo	Howard		02/15/2021	
Indiana	Deaconess - Gateway	Newburgh	Warrick		02/15/2021	
Indiana	Deaconess Midtown Hospital	Evansville	Vanderburgh		02/15/2021	
Indiana	Elkhart General Hospital	Elkhart	Elkhart		02/15/2021	
Indiana	Eskenazi Health	Indianapolis	Marion		02/15/2021	
Indiana	Franciscan Health - Crown Point	Crown Point	Lake		02/15/2021	
Indiana	Franciscan Health - Indianapolis	Indianapolis	Marion		02/15/2021	
Indiana	Franciscan Health - Lafayette East	Lafayette	Tippecanoe		02/15/2021	
Indiana	Franciscan Health - Michigan City	Michigan City	LaPorte		02/15/2021	
Indiana	Good Samaritan Hospital - Vincennes	Vincennes	Knox		02/15/2021	
Indiana	Hendricks Regional Health - Danville Hospital (Main Campus)	Danville	Hendricks		02/15/2021	
Indiana	IU Health - Arnett Hospital	Lafayette	Tippecanoe		02/15/2021	
Indiana	IU Health - Ball Memorial Hospital	Muncie	Delaware		02/15/2021	
Indiana	IU Health - Bloomington Hospital	Bloomington	Monroe		02/15/2021	
Indiana	IU Health - North Hospital	Carmel	Hamilton		02/15/2021	
Indiana	IU Health - West Hospital	Avon	Hendricks		02/15/2021	
Indiana	Kosciusko Community Hospital	Warsaw	Kosciusko		02/15/2021	
Indiana	La Porte Hospital	La Porte	La Porte		02/15/2021	
Indiana	Lutheran Hospital	Fort Wayne	Allen		02/15/2021	
Indiana	Memorial Hospital	South Bend	St. Joseph		02/15/2021	
Indiana	Methodist Hospital - Northlake	Gary	Lake		02/15/2021	
Indiana	Parkview Hospital - Randalia - Ft. Wayne	Fort Wayne	Allen		02/15/2021	
Indiana	Porter Regional Hospital	Valparaiso	Porter		02/15/2021	
Indiana	Reid Health	Richmond	Wayne		02/15/2021	
Indiana	Roudebush VA Medical Center	Indianapolis	Marion		02/15/2021	
Indiana	St. Catherine Hospital	East Chicago	Lake		02/15/2021	
Indiana	St. Joseph Hospital - Ft. Wayne	Fort Wayne	Allen		02/15/2021	
Indiana	St. Joseph Regional Medical Center - South Bend	Mishawaka	St. Joseph		02/15/2021	
Indiana	St. Mary Medical Center	Hobart	Lake		02/15/2021	
Indiana	Terre Haute Regional	Terre Haute	Vigo		02/15/2021	
Kansas	St. Francis Health Center - Topeka	Topeka	Shawnee County			
Kentucky	Baptist Health - Louisville	Louisville	Jefferson		02/15/2021	
Louisiana	University Medical Center	New Orleans	Orleans			
New Mexico	Lea Regional Medical Center	Hobbs	Lea			
New Mexico	Lovelace Medical Center of Lovelace Health System	Albuquerque	Bernalillo			
New Mexico	Mountainview Regional Medical Center	Las Cruces	Doña Ana			
New Mexico	UNM Health	Albuquerque	Bernalillo			
New York	BronxCare Health Systems	Bronx	Bronx		2021	
New York	Brooklyn Hospital Center	Brooklyn	Kings		2021	
New York	Buffalo General Medical Center	Buffalo	Erie		2021	
New York	Catskill Garnet Health - Harris Campus	Harris	Sullivan		2021	
New York	Catskill Regional Medical Center		Sullivan		2021	
New York	Cayuga Medical Center		Tompkins		2021	
New York	Columbia Memorial Hospital		Columbia		2021	
New York	Columbia Memorial Hospital		Columbia		2021	
New York	Corning Hospital		Steuben		2021	
New York	Ellis Hospital		Schenectady		2021	
New York	Elmhurst Hospital Center		Queens		2021	
New York	Erie County Medical Center		Erie		2021	
New York	F F Thompson Hospital		Ontario		2021	
New York	Faxton-St. Luke's Healthcare		Oneida		2021	
New York	Flushing Hospital Medical Center		Queens		2021	
New York	Geneva General Hospital		Ontario		2021	
New York	Glen Cove Hospital		Nassau		2021	
New York	Glens Falls Hospital		Warren		2021	
New York	Good Samaritan Hospital of Suffern		Rockland		2021	
New York	Harlem Hospital Center	Harlem	New York		2021	
New York	HealthAlliance Hospital - Broadway Campus	Kingston	Ulster		2021	
New York	Highland Hospital		Monroe		2021	
New York	Highland Hospital (University of Rochester)	Rochester	Monroe		2021	
New York	Huntington Hospital		Suffolk		2021	
New York	Ira Davenport Memorial Hospital		Steuben		2021	
New York	Jacobi Medical Center	Bronx	Bronx		2021	
New York	Jamaica Hospital Medical Center		Queens		2021	
New York	John T. Mather Memorial Hospital		Suffolk		2021	
New York	Jones Memorial Hospital		Allegany		2021	
New York	Kenmore Mercy Hospital		Erie		2021	
New York	Kingsbrook Jewish Medical Center	Brooklyn	Kings		2021	
New York	Lenox Hill Hospital		New York		2021	
New York	Lincoln Medical and Mental Health Center	Bronx	Bronx		2021	
New York	Long Island Community Hospital		Suffolk		2021	
New York	Long Island Jewish Medical Center		Queens		2021	
New York	Long Island Jewish Valley Stream		Nassau		2021	
New York	Mercy Medical Center		Nassau		2021	
New York	Millard Fillmore Suburban Hospital		Erie		2021	
New York	Montefiore Med. Ctr./Jack D Weiler Hosp. of A Einstein College Div.	Bronx	Bronx		2021	
New York	Montefiore Mount Vernon Hospital		Westchester		2021	
New York	Montefiore New Rochelle Hospital		Westchester		2021	
New York	Montefiore Nyack Hospital	Nyack	Rockland		2021	
New York	Montefiore - St Luke's Cornwall Hospital		Orange		2021	
New York	Mount Sinai Beth Israel/Beth Israel Med. Ctr.		New York		2021	
New York	Mount Sinai Brooklyn/Beth Israel Med. Ctr., King's Highway	Brooklyn	Kings		2021	
New York	Mount Sinai Hospital of Queens		Queens		2021	
New York	Mount Sinai St Lukes		New York		2021	
New York	Mount Sinai West		New York		2021	
New York	Mount St. Mary's Hospital/Mount St Marys Hospital and Health Center		Niagara		2021	
New York	Nassau University Medical Center		Nassau		2021	
New York	New York Community Hospital	Brooklyn	Kings		2021	
New York	New York Presbyterian - Allen Pavilion		New York		2021	
New York	New York Presbyterian Brooklyn Methodist Hospital	Brooklyn	Kings		2021	
New York	New York Presbyterian Hospital - Cornell	New York	New York County		2021	
New York	New York Presbyterian Hospital - Columbia	Columbia	New York County		2021	
New York	New York Presbyterian Hospital - Lower Manhattan	Lower Manhattan	New York County		2021	
New York	New York Presbyterian - Hudson Valley Hospital		Westchester		2021	
New York	New York Presbyterian - Lawrence/Lawrence Hospital		Westchester		2021	
New York	New York Presbyterian - Queens		Queens		2021	
New York	Newark-Wayne Community Hospital		Wayne		2021	
New York	Niagara Falls Memorial Medical Center		Niagara		2021	
New York	Nicholas H. Noyes Memorial Hospital		Livingston		2021	
New York	Northern Dutchess Hospital		Dutchess		2021	
New York	Northern Westchester Hospital Center		Westchester		2021	
New York	NYC Health Plus Hospitals	Brooklyn	Kings		2021	
New York	Olean General Hospital	Olean	Cattaraugus		2021	
New York	Orange Regional Medical Center		Orange		2021	
New York	Our Lady Of Lourdes Memorial Hospital		Broome		2021	
New York	Peconic Bay Medical Center		Suffolk		2021	
New York	Phelps Memorial Hospital Center		Westchester		2021	
New York	Plainview Hospital		Nassau		2021	
New York	Putnam Hospital Center	Carmel	Putnam		2021	
New York	Richmond University Medical Center	Staten Island	Richmond		2021	
New York	Samaritan Hospital		Rensselaer		2021	
New York	Samaritan Medical Center		Jefferson		2021	
New York	SBH Health System/St. Barnabas Hospital	Bronx	Bronx		2021	
New York	Sisters of Charity Hospital		Erie		2021	
New York	SJRH - St. Johns Division		Westchester		2021	
New York	South Nassau Communities Hospital		Nassau		2021	
New York	Southampton Hospital	Southampton	Suffolk		2021	
New York	Southside Hospital		Suffolk		2021	
New York	Staten Island Univ. Hosp. - North	Staten Island North	Richmond		2021	
New York	Staten Island Univ. Hosp. - South	Staten Island South	Richmond		2021	
New York	St. Catherine of Siena Medical Center		Suffolk		2021	
New York	St. Charles Hospital		Suffolk		2021	
New York	St. Francis Hospital - New York		Nassau		2021	
New York	St. Johns Episcopal Hospital	South Shore	Queens		2021	
New York	St. Joseph Hospital - New York		Nassau		2021	
New York	St. Josephs Hospital Health Center		Onondaga		2021	
New York	St. Josephs Medical Center		Westchester		2021	
New York	St. Peter's Hospital	Albany			2021	
New York	SUNY Stony Brook/University Hospital		Suffolk		2021	
New York	Syosset Hospital		Nassau		2021	
New York	United Health Services Hospital - Wilson Medical Center		Broome		2021	
New York	United Memorial Medical Center North Street Campus	Batavia	Genessee		2021	
New York	University Hospital of Brooklyn	Brooklyn	Kings		2021	
New York	UPMC Chautauqua WCA		Chautauqua		2021	
New York	Vassar Brothers Medical Center	Poughkeepsie	Dutchess		2021	
New York	Westchester Medical Center		Westchester		2021	
New York	White Plains Hospital Center	White Plains	Westchester		2021	
New York	Woodhull Medical and Mental Health Center	Brooklyn	Kings		2021	
New York	Wyckoff Heights Medical Center	Brooklyn	Kings		2021	
North Carolina	New Hanover Regional Medical Center (NHRMC)	Wilmington	New Hanover			
North Carolina	Vidant Medical Center	Greenville	Pitt			
North Carolina	Sentara Albemarle Medical Center	Elizabeth City	Pasquotank			
Oregon	Providence Medford Medical Center	Medford	Jackson			
Oregon	Providence Portland Medical Center	Portland	Multnomah			
Pennsylvania	Abington - Lansdale Hospital	Lansdale	Montgomery		2020	
Pennsylvania	Forbes Primary Stroke Center	Monroeville	Allegheny		2020	
Tennessee	Methodist University Hospital - Methodist LeBonheur Healthcare	Memphis	Shelby		2017	
Tennessee	Parkridge Medical Center West	Chattanooga	Hamilton		01/20/2021	
Texas	Medical City Frisco	Frisco	Collin			
Texas	Texoma Medical Center	Denison	Grayson			
Virginia	Sentara Obici Hospital	Suffolk				
Wisconsin	Froedtert Hospital	Milwaukee	Milwaukee		2021	
Wisconsin	Froedtert Menomonee Falls Hospital	Menomonee Falls	Waukesha		2021	
Wisconsin	Froedtert West Bend Hospital	WestBend	Washington		2021	

== Acute stroke ready hospitals ==
State	Hospital	Settlement	County	Expires	Cited	Ref.
Arkansas	Mercy ED - Bella Vista	Bella Vista	Benton		2017	
Arkansas	Mercy ED - Springfield	Springfield	Conway		2017	
Indiana	Franciscan Health	Mooresville	Morgan		02/15/2021	
Indiana	Johnson Memorial Health	Franklin	Johnson		02/15/2021	
Indiana	Margaret Mary Health	Batesville	Franklin		02/15/2021	
Indiana	Reid Health Connersville	Connersville	Fayette		02/15/2021	
Indiana	Schneck Memorial Hospital	Seymour	Jackson		02/15/2021	
Indiana	St. Joseph Regional Medical Center - Plymouth	Plymouth	Marshall		02/15/2021	
Indiana	Woodlawn Hospital	Rochester	Fulton		02/15/2021	
Pennsylvania	Berwick Hospital	Berwick	Columbia		2020	
Pennsylvania	Conemaugh Meyersdale Medical	Meyersdale	Somerset		2020	
Pennsylvania	Geisinger Jersey Shore Hospital	Jersey Shore	Lycoming		2020	
Pennsylvania	Geisinger Lewistown Hospital	Lewistown	Mifflin		2020	
Pennsylvania	Lock Haven Hospital	Lock Haven	Clinton		2020	
Pennsylvania	Tyler Memorial Hospital	Tunkhannock	Wyoming		2020	
Pennsylvania	UPMC Bedford	Everett	Bedford		2020	
Pennsylvania	UPMC Muncy	Muncy	Lycoming		2020	
Pennsylvania	UPMC Wellsboro	Wellsboro	Tioga		2020	
