= AdventHealth Nicholson Center =

Medical research and training center in Florida

Coordinates: 28.3280°N 81.5441°W

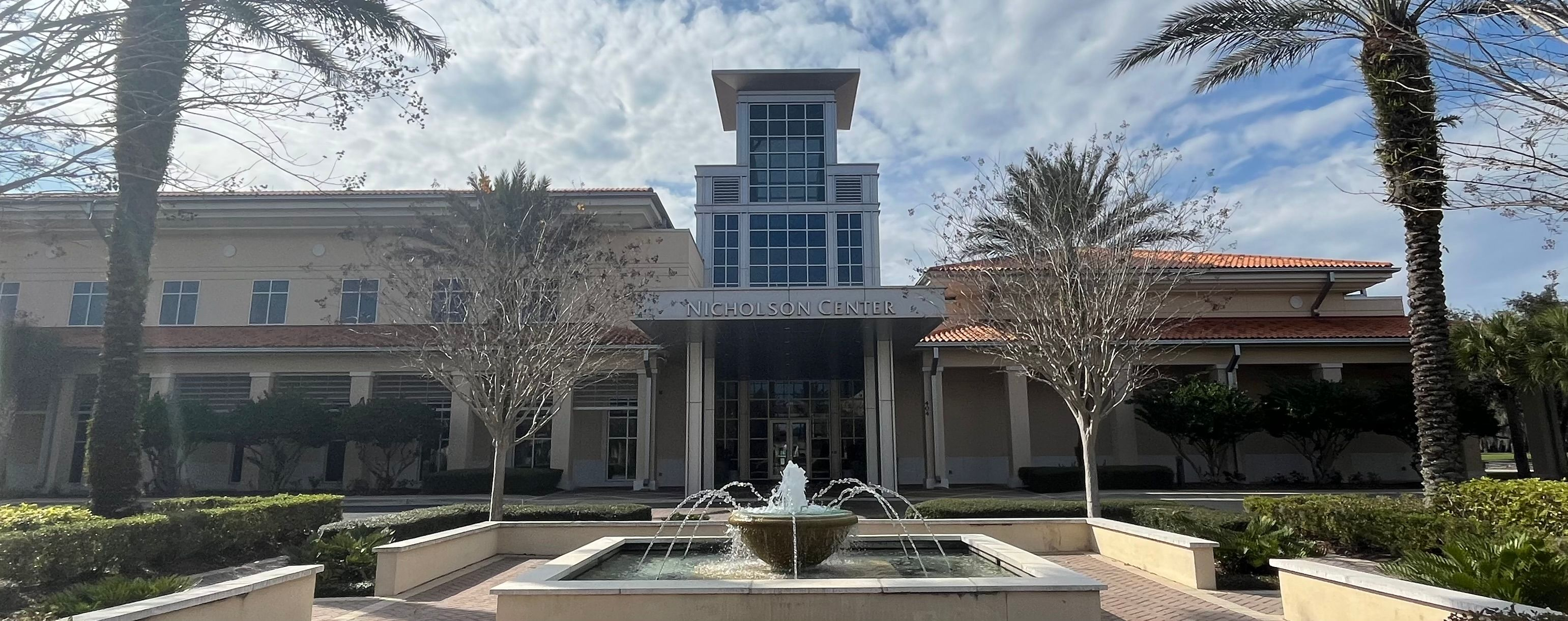
The Nicholson Center at AdventHealth Celebration.

The AdventHealth Nicholson Center is a medical research and training center with locations in Celebration and Orlando, Florida. Founded in 2001, it operates within the AdventHealth network and trains physicians on foundational surgical techniques, including robotic surgery and laparoscopic surgery, using tools like robotic simulators, wet and dry labs. Using emerging robotic, laparoscopic and orthopedic surgical techniques, the Nicholson Center is researching to develop modified ways to operate.

== History ==
In 2001, the center was founded as the Surgical Learning Institute. After receiving a grant in 2008 from Orlando real estate developers, Anthony and Sonja Nicholson, the center became the Florida Hospital Nicholson Center and opened new facility in 2011. The expansion included lecture and education rooms wired for digital conferences, two simulation-training centers, 25 surgical suites and a medical lab with eight surgical robots that are worth a total of over $8 million. The facility is also USGBC LEED Silver Certified. Currently, the Nicholson Center is a 54,000-square-foot, two-story, $54 million facility

The Nicholson Center, originally started as a facility in AdventHealth Celebration, an acute care hospital in Celebration, Florida.

== Training and research ==
=== Academics ===
The Nicholson Center emphasizes education through events and training programs. The education department offers continued medical education to healthcare providers including surgeons, allied health professionals, healthcare administrators, residents, nurses and Fellows. Through its Continuing Medical Education (CME) training, a network of surgeons, physicians and clinicians develop and design curriculums for health societies. Curriculums are developed using a six-step medical education curriculum development process created by Kern et al. Continuing medical education credits are acquired through the ACCME-affiliated accrediting agency within the Florida Hospital Network.

=== Laboratories and Training Rooms ===
The Nicholson Center provides training using operating rooms, clinical and surgical skills labs, simulation training labs and robotics training labs. The facility includes two 935 square-foot operating rooms for training in microsurgery, laparoscopy and computer-assisted surgery, allowing for eight stations per operating room. The labs available for clinical and surgical skills training include 50 stations and wet and dry labs. Lastly, the center's 1,600 square-foot simulation training lab allows surgeons to perform in simulated scenarios. It is also home to one of the largest robotic training labs in the world, incorporating official da Vinci Surgical System robot simulation training.

=== Funding ===
After receiving a $4.9 million grant from the Department of Defense and the Telemedicine and Advanced Technology Research Center (United States Army) (TATRC) in 2011, the research focused on the ways telemedicine technology can be used in surgery for both civilian and military purposes, along with studying other areas of research. With this funding, the center grew to be recognized in the technology and medical industries for its research in telesurgery, gaining recognition in publications such as TechCrunch, ZDNet, Engadget and Computerworld.

=== Telesurgery ===
In association with the Department of Defense, the Nicholson Center conducts studies to conclude if remote surgery across hospitals is possible through the Internet. The Feasibility of Telesurgery Across Metropolitan Hospital Systems study determines what the lag time is between two locations, then mimics that lag time using simulators and/or video displays to study how a surgeon responds to it. The Nicholson Center researched to determine if telesurgery can be performed based on bandwidth available and whether a surgeon can handle the lag time that is in place. The research team, headed by Chief Technology Officer, Dr. Roger Smith, had successfully tested the lag time to Ft. Worth, Texas, a location more than 1,200 miles away. This research determined that telesurgery is safe and possible in the United States. The telesurgery research benefits the US military by finding the necessary steps to providing specialized healthcare for wounded soldiers in remote locations. This remote surgery might take the place of evacuating victims to medical facilities or having specialized surgeons in combat hospitals.

=== Fundamentals of Robotic Surgery Dome and Training ===
The grant also resulted in the first standardized robotic surgery course, with the help of the Veterans Health Administration. This funding helped develop the Fundamentals of Robotic Surgery (FRS) dome, which tests the psychomotor skills of a surgeon within a curriculum. The research also covers cognitive, team training and communication skills. Florida Hospital Nicholson Center also conducts research for Video Gamers vs. Doctors, Surgical Rehearsal, Simulator Effectiveness Comparison and Return on Investment for Robotic Simulators.
