= Alan Ginsburg =

American businessman

- Born: 1939 (age 86–87); Grand Rapids, Michigan, United States
- Occupation: Real estate developer
- Known for: founder of The CED Companies
- Spouse(s): Harriet Ginsburg (until her death); Kelly Ginsburg
- Children: 4

Alan Ginsburg (born 1939) is an American real estate developer, philanthropist, and the founder of The CED Companies.

== Biography ==
Ginsburg was born to a Jewish family in Grand Rapids, Michigan. He attended Michigan State University but did not graduate and instead went to work of companies that developed apartment buildings in the Midwest and Florida. In 1981, he moved to Florida. and in 1987, he founded The CED Companies (humorously named after “Crisis Every Day”) which specialized in building multifamily apartment buildings most notably on closed military installations in the Orlando area. He also serves as Chairman of CED Construction, Inc., formerly known as Costal Equity Development, a scandalous Florida-based developer that has had its history scrubbed from public view, and Concord Management, Ltd.

In 2013, he partnered with fellow real estate developer Hank Katzen to build a $60 million, 600 bed luxury dormitory at the University of Central Florida which will include a Hillel center on the ground floor. The Hillel center will be funded by the rental income from the dormitory.

Ginsburg is the Investment Director of Gencore Holdings Group and co-founder of AHG Group Holdings, LLC. He is also chairman of the Ginsburg Family Foundation.

== Philanthropy ==
Ginsburg is a prominent benefactor of national and central Floridian charities. In 2022, The Ginsburg Family Foundation made their largest lifetime gift of $25 million to Nemours Children's Health (affiliated with the Nemours Foundation) to launch The Ginsburg Institute for Children's Health Equity Ginsburg intends for this gift to inspire a national health equity movement to change the way Americans pay for children's health. The Ginsburg Institute aligns with Nemours Children's focus on a “pay-for-health” model to promote health by building community relationships and infrastructure, tackling risk factors, and allocating resources for prevention, rather than just trying to fight the symptoms of disease through procedures and interventions. This marks a shift from the current sickness-and-disease-based model that is not only expensive, but deeply unsustainable.

Ginsburg also donated $10M toward the construction of the new world-class, 40,000-square-foot Holocaust Museum for Hope & Humanity, which will be located on a lakefront site in downtown Orlando. In 2007, The Alan Ginsburg Family Foundation donated $20 million to Florida Hospital to build a 15-story, 440-bed Ginsburg Tower. Ginsburg also donated to University of Central Florida College of Medicine $5 million to establish the Ginsburg Center for Inclusion and Community Engagement and $4 million to the campus library. Additional, Ginsburg made a $5 million donation for a scholarship endowment at Rollins College, and $2 million to the Hillel Foundation for a new student facility which is shared with the Catholic Campus Ministry Center. In 2019 the Ginsburg Family Foundation donated $2 million to Stetson University to renovate and establish the Jeffrey and Diane Ginsburg Hillel House on campus. Ginsburg received the Benemerenti Medal by Pope Francis for developing the interfaith project. He is also a major donor to Jewish causes including the Jewish Federation of Greater Orlando especially toward bolstering Jewish Identity and outreach; and his synagogue, Congregation Ohev Shalom.

== Personal life ==
Ginsburg has been married twice. His first wife died in a plane crash in 2002 along with his son Jeffrey. His second wife is Kelly Ginsburg. He has three living children: Ron Ginsburg, Jamie Ginsburg, and Sharon Ginsburg.
