= HCA Florida Kendall Hospital =

Hospital in Miami, Florida US

- Hospital Corporation of America

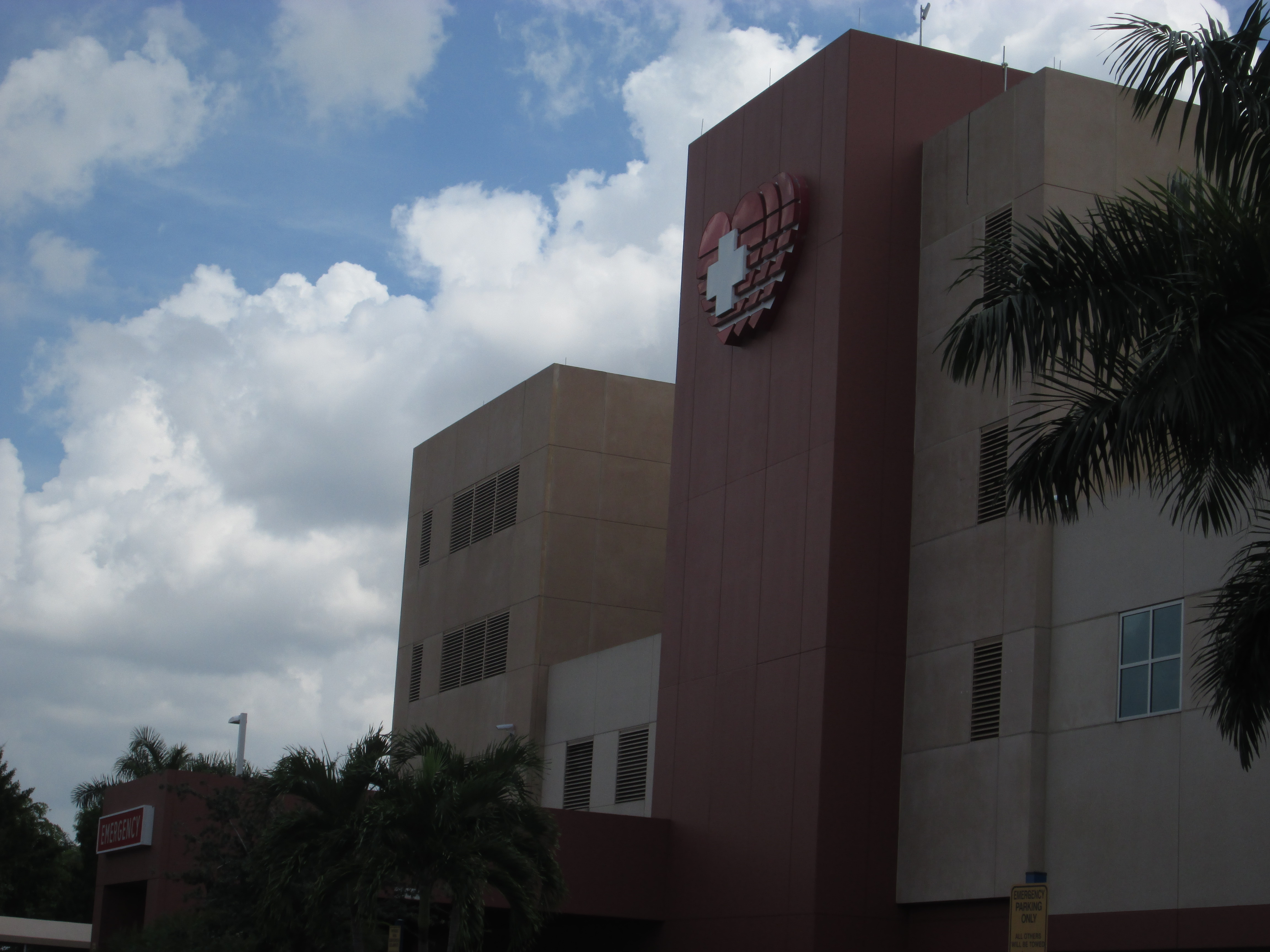
- Kendall Regional Medical Center (now known as HCA Florida Kendall Hospital) in 2015

Geography
- Location: Miami, Florida, United States
- Coordinates: 25°43′52″N 80°23′12″W

Organization
- Care system: Private hospital
- Type: General hospital/Teaching hospital
- Affiliated university: Florida International University; University of South Florida College of Medicine

Services
- Emergency department: Level I trauma center
- Beds: 424

Helipads
- Helipad: Aeronautical chart and airport information for 70FL at SkyVector

History
- Former name: Kendall Regional Medical Center
- Opened: 1973

Links
- Website: www.hcafloridahealthcare.com/locations/kendall-hospital/
- Lists: Hospitals in Florida

HCA Florida Kendall Hospital (formerly Kendall Regional Medical Center) is a for-profit, tertiary care, 424-bed teaching hospital located in the Miami neighborhood of Kendall. HCA Healthcare owns and operates the hospital.

HCA Florida Kendall Hospital is a teaching hospital that serves as the primary training location for several residency and fellowship programs. It currently hosts accredited residencies in the fields of anesthesia, emergency medicine, general surgery, internal medicine, neurology and podiatry. It also hosts a fellowship in surgical critical care. HCA Florida Kendall Hospital is also involved in the training of medical students, and students training in other medical professions. It is affiliated with the Florida International University Herbert Wertheim College of Medicine and the University of South Florida College of Medicine, as well as accepting visiting medical students.

== History ==
The hospital was originally founded in 1973. In May 2016, the hospital's trauma center designation was upgraded from a Level II trauma center to a Level I trauma center.

== Services ==
HCA Florida Kendall Hospital is a Level I trauma center, a comprehensive stroke center, an accredited chest pain center with PCI, and a regional comprehensive burn center. The hospital also features a labor and delivery unit and a Level III neonatal intensive care unit.
