= Florida Hospital =

Healthcare subsidiary

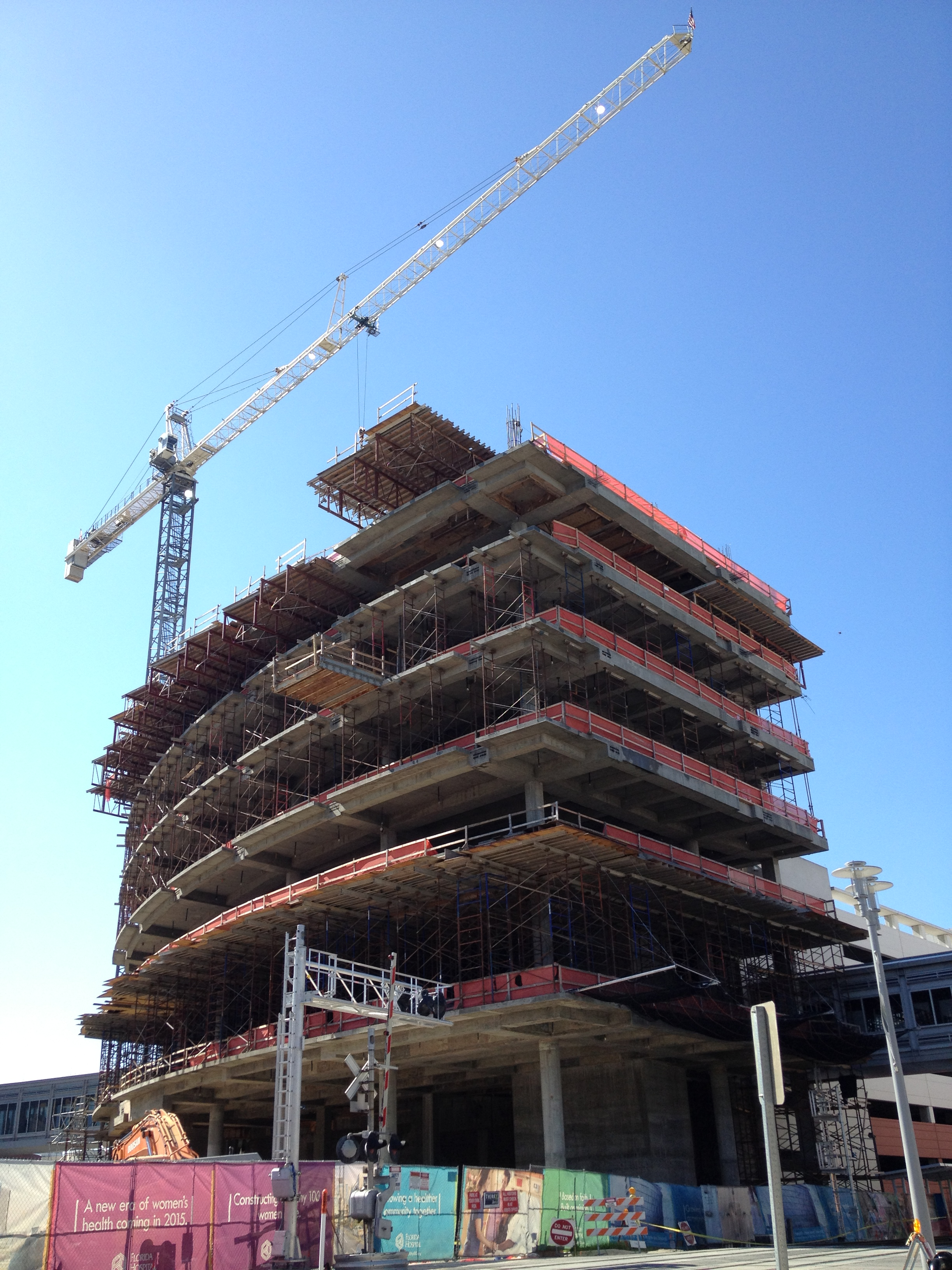
- New headquarters for Florida Hospital under construction in 2013
- Trade name: Florida Hospital
- Type: Nonprofit organization
- Industry: Healthcare
- Predecessor: Florida Sanitarium
- Founded: 1970
- Founder: Donald W. Welch
- Defunct: January 2, 2019; 7 years ago
- Fate: Rebranded
- Successor: AdventHealth
- Headquarters: 550 East Rollins Street, Orlando, Florida, United States
- Number of locations: 28 hospitals (2018)
- Area served: Florida
- Parent: Adventist Health System Sunbelt Healthcare Corporation
- Divisions: Florida Hospital Central Division; Florida Hospital West Division

Florida Hospital was a subsidiary in Orlando, Florida that rebranded when its parent company Adventist Health System Sunbelt Healthcare Corporation rebranded its facilities to the trade name AdventHealth. Before the rebranding it operated 28 hospitals. It signed many entertainment and health partnerships/sponsorships that continue to this day with AdventHealth.

== History ==
In 1961, Don W. Welch, CEO of Florida Sanatorium and others purchased a pasture north of Orlando, Florida. In 1970, the name Florida Hospital was first used when Florida Sanitarium changed its name to Florida Hospital Orlando. In 1975, its parent company purchased North Orange Memorial Hospital, and it became part of Florida Hospital. In 1979, Mardian J. Blair became the second CEO of Florida Hospital. In 1984, Thomas L. Werner became the president and CEO of Florida Hospital.

On December 31, 1990, Orlando General Hospital was acquired by the subsidiary. In late August 1993, Florida Hospital purchased Kissimmee Memorial Hospital from Columbia Hospital Corporation. Also Willow Creek Hospital in Arlington, Texas was sold by Columbia Hospital Corporation to Adventist Health System. Both hospitals were sold for $26.5 million, ending a lawsuit filed by Adventist Health System against Columbia Hospital Corporation. In August 1999, Thomas L. Werner president and CEO of Florida Hospital left to become the president and CEO of Adventist Health System.

In late March 2000, Florida Hospital announced that it planned to purchase Winter Park Memorial Hospital. In early July, it took over the management of the hospital. In late February 2006, Donald L. Jernigan executive vice president and CEO of Florida Florida was chosen as president and CEO of Adventist Health System. He took office on March 1. In 2006, Lars Houmann became the new president and CEO of Florida Hospital.

In early December 2012, Kangaroo Express donated $110,000 to Florida Hospital Pink Army for its fight against breast cancer. In early January 2013, Florida Hospital sold the vacant lot where Florida Hospital Ormond Memorial once stood for $2 million to Buddy LaCour and investors. In early October 2013, Florida Hospital opened two women's health centers, one in Celebration, Florida and another in Winter Park, Florida. On December 1, 2015, Lars Houman became president and CEO of Adventist Health System's Florida Division; he and his predecessors were doing both of the jobs.

In early February 2016, Florida Hospital opened its third free lung clinic in Kissimmee, Florida. After the Pulse nightclub shooting in June 2016, Florida Hospital spent $3.5 million on security. It purchased and installed 2,500 security cameras at its central Florida campuses. It also purchased six German Shepherds. Florida Hospital hired 162 security guards to patrol its central Florida campuses; majority would be in uniform and twelve would be in dress clothes.

In late May 2017, Florida Hospital was negotiating with Sanford Burnham Prebys Medical Discovery Institute to purchase their facility in Lake Nona, Orlando, Florida. In late January 2018, it changed its mind about purchasing the facility because it did not want to compete against its partner, University of Central Florida. Before Florida Hospital changed its mind, it had tried to secretly purchase the facility from Sanford Burnham Prebys Medical Discovery Institute, when Orange County officials found out about it they were upset. In November 2017, Florida Hospital became the first hospital network in the United States to purchase the Senhance Surgical System. The European robotic surgical system was approved by the FDA in October.

In early February 2018, Florida Hospital opened a fitness park in Daytona Beach, Florida. On August 14, it was announced that Florida Hospital, a subsidiary of Adventist Health System, would be rebranded to AdventHealth.

On January 2, 2019, all Florida Hospital health facilities rebranded to AdventHealth.

== Charity giving ==
On November 11, 2014, Florida Hospital announced that it would spend $6 million in three years to fight homelessness in central Florida.

== Pledge ==
On February 22, 2016, Florida Hospital pledged $1.5 million to the University of Central Florida, to help it have a 165,000 square foot (15,300 m^{2}), $60 million academic services building constructed for a new campus that it was planning in downtown Orlando.

== Partnerships and sponsorships ==
=== Walt Disney World ===
On February 2, 2018, Walt Disney World chose Florida Hospital and Orlando Health to offer health insurance for the majority of their 70,000 employees. While Cigna would offer health insurance for employees outside of the service areas of the hospital networks.

=== Sports ===
In 1989, Florida Hospital became the Official Healthcare Partner of the Orlando Magic. It was renewed in 2017.

In 2011, it was announced that the Florida Hospital would be the Official Health and Wellness Partner of the Tampa Bay Lightning; their sponsorship was extended in 2014 and 2017.

In 2012, it was announced that Florida Hospital would be the Exclusive Hospital of the Tampa Bay Buccaneers under a sponsorship agreement. On August 27, 2018, Florida Hospital signed a naming rights deal with the Tampa Bay Buccaneers. For ten years, the training facility of the Tampa Bay Buccaneers will be known as the AdventHealth Training Center. Florida Hospital and the Tampa Bay Buccaneers have made a series of educational health and wellness videos.

On October 30, 2014, it was announced that Florida Hospital had signed a 12 year-year partnership, and would become the Official Healthcare Partner of Daytona International Speedway replacing Halifax Health. Halifax Health had been a partner with Daytona International Speedway since February 9, 2011. Also on October 30, it was announced that Florida Hospital had become the second founding partner of Daytona Rising, the first founding member was Toyota. On January 1, 2015, Florida Hospital became the sponsor of Daytona International Speedway, and during the Daytona 500, it operated the racetrack's care center and ambulances. On October 8, 2018, Florida Hospital was announced as the sponsor of Daytona Speedweek.

=== Health ===
In October 2007, Florida Hospital and University of Central Florida College of Medicine signed a partnership, to have its students continue their education with the hospital network. In 2012, this partnership started to show signs of stress when the medical school created a graduate program with Hospital Corporation of America and also because the medical school wanted a teaching hospital.

In August 2013, Florida Hospital and Health First started offering Medicare Advantage plans in Flagler County and Volusia County. One year later, Florida Hospital expanded to individual commercial merchandise for those counties, and Medicare Advantage expanded to Hardee County and Highlands County. On November 9, 2018, it was announced that Florida Hospital would buy a minority interest in Health First. The new partnership has to be approved by Health First's board of directors and the government.

On January 11, 2017, it was announced that Florida Hospital would manage 15 health clinics inside Walgreens in the Tampa Bay area. They would officially be known as Florida Hospital Express Care at Walgreens. On June 15, Florida Hospital officially took over the walk-in clinics. In late January 2017, the subsidiary signed an agreement to be part of Connected City, Florida. In early October, Florida Hospital partnered with the American Diabetes Association and created the Morning Mile program to fight childhood obesity. The program encourages students to walk and run; it was introduced at five elementary schools in Flagler County and Volusia County.

In early June 2018, Florida Hospital became the Official Healthcare Champion of Volusia County Schools after the school approved a $2 million, five-year partnership by a vote of 4-0. It will involve the renaming of fifteen health services academies and programs at the school district's middle schools and high schools. The students are taught biomedical sciences, sport science and emergency medical technician/paramedic classes for future jobs in the medical field. Following the partnership, a meeting was held at Deltona High School, mostly made up of Halifax Health employees who were worried that their behavior therapy and mental health services would be restricted.

== Data breaches and aftermath ==
From January 2009 to July 2011, Dale Munroe II stole over 12,000 medical records of motor vehicle accident patients from Florida Hospital Celebration Health for Sergei Kusyakov. On July 12, 2011, Dale Munroe II was fired by Florida Hospital for the data breach. His wife Katrina continued to steal records until she was fired on August 2012. On October 10, 2012, Dale Munroe II was indicted for conspiracy and four counts of wrongful disclosure of individually identifiable health information in the United States District Court for the Middle District of Florida. On October 22, he was arraigned in court and pleaded guilty. In December, his wife was arraigned in court and pleaded guilty. On January 7, 2013, Sergei Kusyakov was arraigned and pleaded guilty to the same criminal charges. On January 14, Dale Munroe II was sentenced to 12 months in prison and two years of supervised release.

On March 20, 2015, Florida Hospital fired two employees for copying 9,000 medical records after being notified by the Federal Bureau of Investigation on May 2, 2014; the data breach began in January 2012. On February 28, 2018, Tanganica Corbett and Kevin Weaver II were indicted in the United States District Court for the Middle District of Florida for conspiracy to defraud the United States and two counts of wrongful disclosure of individually identifiable health information. On March 1, 2018, Corbett was arraigned in court and she pleaded not guilty. On March 13, Weaver II was arrested and arraigned in court, and he pleaded not guilty. On April 24, the defendants appeared in court and changed their not guilty pleas to guilty, cancelling the trial against them. On July 16, Corbett was sentenced to 1 year and 1 month in prison and 3 years of supervised release. Weaver II was sentenced to 3 years and 5 months in prison and 3 years of supervised release.

In early July 2015, Florida Hospital faced two lawsuits from patients due to the data breaches. The hospital network asked a judge to dismiss both of them.

== Whistleblower lawsuit ==
In December 2014, a former physician of Florida Hospital Heart and Lung Transplant Institute, filed a lawsuit against the subsidiary claiming that they violated the Florida Whistleblower's Act when they fired him. The reason why Florida Hospital fired him was because, he had threatened to report what he considered unsafe practices by the institute director to the United Network for Organ Sharing. On February 23, 2018, in court the plaintiff was awarded $2.85 million by the jury. The subsidiary appealed the verdict and on October 30, 2020, an appellate court overturned it.

== See also ==
- Jeffrey Kuhlman
- Florida Hospital Oceanside
- List of Seventh-day Adventist hospitals
