= Brasfield & Gorrie =

American construction company

Coordinates: 33.512200°N 86.785290°W

Brasfield & Gorrie, LLC
- Type: Privately held company
- Industry: General contractor (construction)
- Founded: 1921 as Thomas C. Brasfield Company
- Founder: Thomas C. Brasfield
- Headquarters: Birmingham, Alabama, USA
- Key people: M. Miller Gorrie, Chairman; M. James Gorrie, Chief Executive Officer
- Services: General construction Construction management Design / Build
- Revenue: ▲US$6.37 billion (2024)
- Number of employees: 4,300 (2024)
- Website: www.brasfieldgorrie.com

Brasfield & Gorrie, LLC, headquartered in Birmingham, Alabama, is one of the United States' largest privately held construction firms, providing general contracting, design-build, and construction management services for a wide variety of markets. Founded in 1964, Brasfield & Gorrie has 13 offices and approximately 4,300 employees. Its 2024 revenues were over $6 billion. Engineering News-Record ranks Brasfield & Gorrie 21st among the nation’s “Top 400 Contractors” for 2022. Modern Healthcare ranks the company No. 1 among healthcare general contractors in the nation.

== History ==
Founded as the Thomas C. Brasfield Company by its namesake in 1921, the company originally performed small commercial and remodeling projects. The company continued in this market until it was acquired in 1964 by Miller Gorrie, who changed the company's name to Brasfield & Gorrie in 1967. As the company grew, Gorrie moved its focus to larger commercial, industrial, and institutional projects. Brasfield & Gorrie expanded its operations in the late 1960s and early 1970s to include high-rise and specialty concrete structures, and expanded further in 1977 to include infrastructure projects, including water and sewage treatment plants. The company diversified into the healthcare industry in 1969 and has continued to the present day. In 1985, Brasfield & Gorrie created two new regions of operation by opening offices in Atlanta, Georgia and Orlando, Florida. It has additional offices in Raleigh, North Carolina, Nashville, Tennessee, Jacksonville, Florida, Dallas, Texas, and Columbus, Georgia. Brasfield & Gorrie has grown in contract revenues from less than $1 million in its first year of operation in 1964 to nearly $5 billion in 2022.

== Major projects ==
=== Commercial ===
- Regions Financial Corporation - Operations Center, Birmingham, Alabama
- ALFA Corporation - Business Processing and Recovery Center, Montgomery, Alabama
- Regions-Harbert Plaza - a 32 story, 437 foot (138 m) office building located in, Birmingham, Alabama
- HealthSouth Corporation - Corporate Headquarters Campus, Birmingham, Alabama (1997)
- HealthSouth Corporation Corporate Headquarters (2018), Birmingham, Alabama
- AT&T Building - AT&T Tennessee Headquarters, Nashville, Tennessee
- Blue Cross Blue Shield of Alabama - Corporate Headquarters Campus, Birmingham, Alabama
- 1010 Midtown - a 35 story mixed-use building located in Atlanta, Georgia
- Colonial Brookwood Center - 9 story multi-tenant office building in Birmingham, Alabama
- Genuine Parts Headquarters Atlanta, Georgia

=== Healthcare ===
- St. Vincent's Medical Center- South and North Tower additions, Birmingham, Alabama
- Grandview Medical Center Birmingham - Originally the HealthSouth Medical Center hospital, now flagship for Community Health Systems
- UAB Women & Infants Center and the Hazelrig-Salter Radiation Oncology Center, Birmingham, Alabama
- Huntsville Hospital Tram System - a people mover connecting buildings at the Huntsville Hospital
- Texoma Medical Center - Denison, Texas
- Moses H. Cone Memorial Hospital - North Tower & CEP - Greensboro, North Carolina
- Florida Hospital for Women
- AdventHealth Orlando fourteen-story Northwest Tower
- AdventHealth Sebring five-story Northeast tower
- AdventHealth Weaverville - Weaverville, North Carolina

=== Sports & Leisure ===
- SunTrust Park (Now Truist Park) - new home of the Atlanta Braves opening in 2017 (10 miles NW of Atlanta in Cobb County) - built via American Builders 2017 (A joint venture between Brasfield & Gorrie, Mortenson Construction, Barton Malow and New South Construction)
- The College Football Hall of Fame - Located in Atlanta, Georgia opened August 2014
- Coleman Coliseum - a 15,316-seat multi-purpose arena in Tuscaloosa, Alabama that serves as home to the University of Alabama Crimson Tide basketball and gymnastics teams
- Georgia Aquarium and Georgia Aquarium Expansion - the world's largest aquarium located in Atlanta, Georgia
- Georgia Dome - a domed stadium located in Atlanta, Georgia and home to the Atlanta Falcons
- Visionland - a theme park located outside of Birmingham, Alabama in Bessemer, Alabama
- Bryant-Denny South Endzone Stadium Expansion at The University of Alabama-Tuscaloosa - an expansion to the University's football stadium that brought the capacity to 101,821, making it the fifth largest stadium in the nation. The expansion was completed in time for the 2010 Crimson Tide football season.
- The Greenbrier - renovation and construction of the Spa and Sporting Club
- Tiger Stadium - Completed the south endzone expansion at Louisiana State University. The expansion brought capacity to 102,321, making it the third largest in the Southeastern Conference.

=== Institutional ===
- McWane Science Center - a science museum and research archive located in downtown Birmingham, Alabama
- Auburn University Student Center- a replacement student activities center in Auburn, Alabama
- Ensworth School - Academic building, library and art/science renovation project in Nashville, Tennessee
- Paideia School - Gymnasium and expansion to the junior high school which earned LEED Gold in Atlanta, Georgia

=== Government ===
- U.S. Department of the Interior Hydrologic Instrumentation Facility, Tuscaloosa, Alabama
- Department of Justice Program Multiple Projects, Redstone Arsenal - Huntsville, Alabama
- U.S. Army Corps Army Depot Generators, Anniston, Alabama
- U.S. Courthouse Huntsville, Alabama (FY18) [ LEED Gold, SITES Silver ]
- U.S. Courthouse Greenville, South Carolina (FY16 Courthouse Program) [ LEED Gold, SITES Silver ]
- U.S. Courthouse Charlotte, North Carolina (FY16 Courthouse Program) [ LEED Gold, SITES Silver ]
- U.S. Courthouse San Antonio, Texas (FY16 Courthouse Program) [ LEED Gold, SITES Silver ]
- U.S. Courthouse (Tomochichi) Savannah, Georgia (FY16 Courthouse Program) [ LEED Gold, SITES Silver ]
- U.S. Department of Defense Barracks at Fort Benning, Fort Jackson, Camp LeJeune [ LEED Gold ]
- NASA Test Stands, Marshall Flight Center, Alabama ( in support of Space Launch System - Artemis )
- National Naval Medical Center Main Exchange, Bethesda, Maryland
- U.S. Department of Veterans Affairs Outpatient Clinic, Greenville, South Carolina
- U.S. Land Port of Entry, Laredo, Texas (FY14) [ LEED Platinum ]
- U.S. Land Port of Entry, Donna, Texas (FY10) [ LEED Gold ]
- U.S. Land Port of Entry, Anzalduas, Texas (FY09) [ LEED Silver ]
- U.S. Veteran Affairs Medical Center, Lake Nona, Florida (FY10) [ LEED Silver ]
- U.S. Courthouse, Shreveport, Louisiana (first GSA Design-Build U.S. Courthouse)
- U.S Courthouse, Little Rock, Arkansas
- U.S. Courthouse, Birmingham, Alabama
