= List of burn centers in the United States =

This is a list of burn centers in the United States. A burn center or burn care facility is typically a hospital ward which specializes in the treatment of severe burn injuries. As of 2011, there are 123 self-designated burn care facilities in the United States. The American Burn Association (ABA) and the American College of Surgeons (ACS) developed a joint review program to verify burn centers that meet the criteria for optimal care to burn patients. The following list includes burn centers that are known to the ABA as of March 2016.

== Alabama ==
- Arnold Luterman Regional Burn Center at the University of South Alabama
- Children's Hospital of Alabama
- UAB Burn Center

== Alaska ==
Alaska has no ABA-verified burn center, and its regional center is in Seattle, WA. The Alaska Native Medical Center in Anchorage has some burn care capabilities, and has been listed as a non-verified center by the ABA.

== Arizona ==
- Arizona Burn Center at Valleywise Health

== Arkansas ==
- Arkansas Children's Hospital Burn Center (adult and pediatric)

== California ==
=== Northern California ===
- Bothin Burn Center at UCSF Saint Francis Memorial Hospital
- Burn Clinic at Kaiser South San Francisco Medical Center
- Santa Clara Valley Medical Center — Regional Burn Center
- Shriners Hospitals for Children — Northern California
- University of California, Davis — Regional Burn Center
- Zuckerberg San Francisco General Hospital Outpatient Burn and Wound Clinic

=== Central California ===
- The Grossman Burn Center at Dignity Bakersfield Memorial Hospital
- Leon S. Peters Burn Center at Community Regional Medical Center in Fresno

=== Southern California ===
- Edward G. Hirschman Burn Center at Arrowhead Regional Medical Center in Colton
- The Grossman Burn Center at UCLA West Valley Medical Center, West Hills, California
- Orange County Burn Center at Orange County Global in Santa Ana
- Burn Unit at Los Angeles General Hospital
- Torrance Memorial Medical Center Burn Center
- University of California, Irvine Medical Center — Burn Center
- University of California San Diego Burn Center

== Colorado ==
- Children's Hospital Colorado Burn Center
- Swedish Medical Center Burn and Reconstructive Center (Level I Trauma Center)
- University of Colorado Hospital Burn Center

== Connecticut ==
- Connecticut Burn Center at Bridgeport Hospital

== Delaware ==
As of 2006, Delaware has no burn centers.

== District of Columbia ==
- Children's National Medical Center — Burn Unit
- Washington Hospital Center — Burn Center

== Florida ==
- HCA Florida Kendall Hospital — Burn and Reconstructive Centers of Florida
- Orlando Regional Medical Center — Warden Burn Center
- Tampa General Hospital — Tampa Bay Regional Burn Center
- University of Florida — Shands Burn Center
- University of Miami — Jackson Memorial Burn Center

== Georgia ==
- Grady Memorial Hospital Burn Center
- The Joseph M. Still Burn Center at Doctors Hospital
- The Joseph M. Still Burn Center at WellStar Cobb Hospital (Austell) Inpatient and Outpatient Clinic

== Hawaii ==
- Straub Clinic & Hospital Burn Unit

== Idaho ==
- Eastern Idaho Regional Medical Center

== Illinois ==
- Loyola University Medical Center Burn Center
- Memorial Burn Care
- OSF Saint Anthony Medical Center
- Sumner L. Koch Burn Center — John H. Stroger, Jr. Hospital of Cook County
- University of Chicago Burn Center

== Indiana ==
- Indiana University School of Medicine: Riley Hospital for Children at Indiana University Health
- Sidney and Lois Eskenazi Hospital
- St. Joseph's Medical Center — Regional Burn Center
- St. Vincent Indianapolis Hospital

== Iowa ==
- University of Iowa Hospitals and Clinics Burn Treatment Center

== Kansas ==
- Ascension Via Christi St. Francis Regional Burn Center
- University of Kansas Hospital — Burnett Burn Center

== Kentucky ==
- Marion Wound and Burn Center
- Norton Children's Hospital Burn Unit
- University of Louisville Hospital Burn Unit

== Louisiana ==
- Baton Rouge General Medical Center Burn Center
- Our Lady of Lourdes Burn Center
- Louisiana State University Health Sciences Center Shreveport Regional Burn Center
- University Medical Center New Orleans ABA Verified Burn Center

== Maine ==
- Maine Medical Center — Special Care Unit

== Maryland ==
- Johns Hopkins Bayview Medical Center — Johns Hopkins Burn Center (adult, verified)
- Johns Hopkins Hospital — Johns Hopkins Burn Center (Pediatric)
- National Burn Reconstruction Center at Good Samaritan Hospital

== Massachusetts ==
- Brigham and Women's Hospital Burn Center
- Massachusetts General Hospital — Sumner Redstone Burn Center
- Shriners Hospitals for Children — Boston
- Spaulding Rehabilitation Hospital Burn Rehabilitation Program
- University of Massachusetts Medical School

== Michigan ==
- Bronson Methodist Hospital Burn and Wound Center
- Children's Hospital of Michigan Burn Center
- The Burn Center Detroit Receiving Hospital
- Hurley Medical Center HMC Burn Unit
- Spectrum Health Regional Burn Center
- St. Mary's Medical Center Burn Trauma Intensive Care Unit
- University of Michigan Health System

== Minnesota ==
- Hennepin County Medical Center Burn Center
- Regions Hospital Burn Center

== Mississippi ==
- Mississippi Burn, Hand & Reconstruction Center
- UMMC Mississippi Burn Center
- Joseph M. Still Burn and Reconstruction Center at Central Mississippi Medical Center, Jackson (closed in 2022)
- Mississippi Firefighters Memorial Burn Center at the Delta Regional Medical Center (closed in 2006)

== Missouri ==
- Barnes-Jewish Hospital
- Children's Mercy Hospital Burn Unit
- Mercy Springfield Burn Center
- Mercy St. Louis Burn Center
- Research Medical Center Grossman Burn Center
- St. Louis Children's Hospital Burn Center
- University of Missouri Hospital George David Peak Memorial Burn Center

== Montana ==
Montana, as of 2007, had no burn centers. Depending on region and severity, patients may be sent to Idaho Falls, Salt Lake City, or Seattle.

== Nebraska ==
- St. Elizabeth Regional Burn Center

== Nevada ==
- Lions Burn Care Center at University Medical Center of Southern Nevada

== New Hampshire ==
As of 2007, New Hampshire had no burn centers.

== New Jersey ==
- Saint Barnabas Medical Center Burn Center

== New Mexico ==
- University of New Mexico Hospital Burn Unit

== New York ==
- Erie County Medical Center — Roger W. Seibel Burn Treatment Center
- Harlem Hospital Center — Harlem Burn Center
- Jacobi Medical Center — Jacobi Burn Center
- Nassau University Medical Center - Nassau County Firefighters Burn Center
- Staten Island University Hospital - Jerome L. Finkelstein, MD, Regional Burn Center
- Stony Brook University Hospital — Suffolk County Volunteer Firefighters Burn Center
- Strong Memorial Hospital - Kessler Family Burn/Trauma Unit
- Upstate University Hospital - Clark Burn Center
- Weill Cornell Medical Center - William Randolph Hearst Burn Center
- Westchester Medical Center — Burn Center at Westchester Medical Center

== North Carolina ==
- Atrium Health Wake Forest Baptist Medical Center
- North Carolina Jaycee Burn Center / UNC Medical Center

== North Dakota ==
North Dakota does not have a burn center; burn patients are sent to University of Colorado Hospital or Hennepin County Medical Center Burn Center.

== Ohio ==
- Akron Children's Hospital Burn Unit (adult and pediatric)
- C. R. Boeckman Regional Burn Center
- MetroHealth Medical Center Comprehensive Burn Care Center
- Miami Valley Hospital Regional Adult Burn Center
- Nationwide Children's Hospital Burn Unit
- Shriners Hospitals for Children — Cincinnati Burns Hospital
- St. Vincent Mercy Medical Center Burn Care Center
- University of Cincinnati Hospital Burn Special Care Unit
- Wexner Medical Center at Ohio State University Burn Center

== Oklahoma ==
- Alexander Burn Center
- INTEGRIS Paul Silverstein Burn Center

== Oregon ==
- Legacy Emanuel Hospital Oregon Burn Center

== Pennsylvania ==
- Lehigh Valley Hospital Burn Center
- The Nathan Speare Regional Burnt Treatment Center in Crozer-Chester Medical Center in Upland (closed in 2025)
- St. Christopher's Hospital for Children Pediatric Burn Center
- Temple University Hospital Temple Burn Center
- Temple University Burn Rehabilitation Center
- Thomas Jefferson University Hospital Thomas Jefferson University Burn Center
- UPMC Mercy
- Western Pennsylvania Hospital Burn Trauma Center

== Rhode Island ==
- Rhode Island Hospital

== South Carolina ==
- Medical University of South Carolina Burn Center (adult and pediatric)

== South Dakota ==
- McKennan Hospital

== Tennessee ==
- Regional Firefighter's Burn Center — Memphis
- Vanderbilt Burn Center — Nashville
- Burn and Reconstructive Center at TriStar Skyline Medical Center

== Texas ==
- The House of Charity
- Kyle P. McLeroy Burn Center
- Medical City Plano — The Burn and Reconstructive Center of Texas
- Memorial Hermann Hospital — John S. Dunn Burn Center
- Methodist Health System - The Burn Center at Methodist Dallas
- Methodist Hospital Burn and Reconstructive Center in San Antonio
- San Antonio Military Medical Center
- Shriners Hospital for Children-Galveston
- Southwestern Regional Burn Center — Parkland Memorial Hospital
- Spencer Memorial Burn Center — TC Jester
- University Health - Pediatric Trauma & Burn Center
- University Medical Center – Lubbock (Timothy J. Harnar Burn Center)
- University of Texas Medical Branch — Blocker Burn Center
- University of Texas, Austin - Dell Seton Medical Center
- US Army Institute of Surgical Research — Fort Sam Houston

== Utah ==
- University of Utah Hospital — Burn Center

== Vermont ==
- The University of Vermont Medical Center Hospital Campus — Burn Program

== Virginia ==
- Evans Haynes Burn Center — VCU Medical Center
- Retreat Wound Healing Center — Burn Program
- Sentara Norfolk General Hospital Burn Trauma Unit — Eastern Virginia Medical School
- Burn and Reconstructive Center at Chippenham Hospital

== Washington ==
- Firefighter's Burn Center — St. Joseph Medical Center
- Sacred Heart Medical Center Burn Program
- University of Washington Burn Center/Harborview

== Washington, D.C. ==
- Children's National - Trauma Care
- The Burn Center at MedStar Washington Hospital Center

== West Virginia ==
- Cabell Huntington Hospital's Burn Unit

== Wisconsin ==
- Children's Hospital of Wisconsin
- Columbia St. Marys-Milwaukee Burn Unit
- University of Wisconsin Hospital and Clinics Burn Center

== Wyoming ==
As of 2007, Wyoming had no burn centers. Wyoming sends its burn victims to Colorado:

- University of Colorado Hospital Burn Center
