= Stroke center =

Medical center specializing in strokes

Stroke Center
- System: Stroke certification
- Focus: Stroke triage, health care efficiency, improved outcomes
- Significant diseases: stroke
- Specialist: First responder

Stroke centers are medical centers having health professionals specially trained in emergency stroke care. They are considered preferred first responders in the diagnosis and treatment of strokes. Certifying authorities recognize four levels of certification, highest to lowest, as follow:

- comprehensive stroke center
- thrombectomy-capable stroke center
- primary stroke center
- acute stroke-ready hospital

The Stroke Center Certification Program was developed by The Joint Commission in collaboration with the American Heart Association and the American Stroke Association. These organizations offer guidance for the development of state-level policy standards in stroke care, including the designation of qualified facilities.

In order to be recognized as a stroke center, a medical center must meet national guidelines for specialized medical care as recommended by a certifying authority. A facility must either obtain certification by training or by being recognized by a certification or accreditation authority for its existing level of skilled care. Certifying authorities include DNV GL Healthcare; Healthcare Facilities Accreditation Program (HFAP), now a division of Accreditation Commission for Health Care (ACHC); or The Joint Commission (TJC). In some states a state health department or medical board may be the certifying authority. For example, in New York, centers are designated by the New York State Department of Health (NYSDOH).

Pre-admission triage by Emergency Medical Service (EMS) technicians dictate the level of stroke center to which a stroke patient will be routed; considerations include severity of the symptoms, evaluation of the level of medical care that may be needed, and the relative distance of various certified stroke centers in the vicinity of each medical event. Upon patient arrival, the qualified medical center should follow recommended protocols for stroke triage, developed by the American Heart Association and American Stroke Association. These include specified, time-sensitive medical care at exact intervals between ten minutes and one hour, starting at the time of arrival at the hospital's emergency department. Typically, medical interventions are timed using a stopwatch, while a qualified member of the stroke team announces each interval.

Adherence to this critical one-hour time scale recognizes that speedy care creates a better chance of recovery. Nursing Management says, "Research has shown that early evaluation and treatment are directly linked to reduced motor and cognitive deficits, as well as lower mortality." Protocols generally include physical examination, obtaining a summary of the patient's medical history, cursory physical coordination and speech tests, blood tests, CT scans or MRI, scan evaluation, and recommended treatment (such as administering blood-thinners, thrombolysis, or preparation for surgery).

== Comprehensive stroke center ==
Comprehensive Stroke Centers must meet the requirements of all lower tiers of certification. In addition, at this level, the acute stroke team must include "personnel trained in vascular neurology, neurosurgery and endovascular procedures." These skilled personnel should be on staff or on call 24 hours a day, seven days a week. The Stroke Awareness Foundation (SAF) states that these centers must be able to perform "advanced imaging techniques, including MRI/MRA, CTA, DSA and TCD."

For Comprehensive Stroke Centers, readiness to receive complex stroke cases is crucial. According to SAF, these centers should have "24/7 availability of personnel, imaging, operating room and endovascular facilities", as well as "ICU/neuroscience ICU facilities and capabilities." Further, it says, the comprehensive center must show "expertise treating patients with large ischemic strokes, intracerebral hemorrhage and subarachnoid hemorrhage." The center must serve a sufficient number of stroke patients to prove experience and must maintain an adequate number of dedicated beds in intensive care units. Typically these advanced-care facilities are found in metropolitan areas.

== Thrombectomy-capable stroke center ==
In addition to the certification requirements designated for the Acute Stroke-Ready Hospital (ASRH) and the Primary Stroke Center (PSC), a Thrombectomy-Capable Stroke Center (TCSC) must be able to perform a surgical thrombectomy. According to Johns Hopkins Medicine, this procedure is sometimes necessary "to remove a blood clot from inside an artery or vein." Smaller clots may be removed using blood thinners, which may be done at a lower-tiered stroke facility. The capability of performing the surgery and followup care is what distinguishes the TCSC from the lower-tiered PSC. Whenever possible, a patient's potential as a candidate for this procedure should be identified by EMS technicians during the initial, pre-admission triage, so that the patient may be taken to a center of this surgical-skill level. The TCSC is a second-level stroke center, less skilled than the top-level Comprehensive Stroke Center (CSC) for more complex stroke cases needing advanced or long-term-care.

== Primary stroke center ==
Of the four levels of stroke centers recognized by certifying authorities, the Primary Stroke Center (PSC) is at Level 2, ranking lower than Comprehensive Stroke Centers and Thrombectomy-Capable Stroke Centers, but ahead of Acute Stroke-Ready Hospitals.

The Joint Commission defines a Primary Stroke Center as follows: "This program is designed for hospitals providing the critical elements to achieve long-term success in improving outcomes for stroke patients." Primary stroke centers have "acute stroke teams" as recommended by the Brain Attack Coalition. The centers should have a certain number of dedicated beds in intensive care. They may have access to or be more likely to use special processes and medications for diagnosing and treating strokes than acute stroke centers. After the initial emergency treatment for patient stabilization and evaluation, centers may recommend transport to a comprehensive stroke center for further treatment by qualified stroke specialists or long-term stroke care. In a study of one state's program (Georgia), researchers found that "Primary stroke centers (PSCs) are associated with greater rates of tissue plasminogen activator use and improved outcomes."

The United States has over a thousand primary stroke centers. Stroke Awareness Foundation mentions that 49 states, Washington, D.C., and Puerto Rico, have stroke centers which meet this level of certification. "A Summary of Primary Stroke Center Policy in the United States," released in 2011 by the Centers for Disease Control and Prevention, places the number of states having certified PSCs at fifty, plus the District of Columbia (as of 2009). Primary Stroke Centers typically serve patients who do not need thrombectomy or patients in underserved rural communities where higher-level stroke centers are more than ninety minutes away.

The CDC's 2011 Summary addresses public policy regarding Primary Stroke Centers. It lists thirty-one states and the District of Columbia as having no policy. The other states, it says, have either enacted some type of policy (legislative or administrative) or, by 2010, had legislation pending. Those which had enacted legislation by July 2010 were: "Delaware, Florida, Georgia, Illinois, Kentucky, Missouri, New Jersey, New Mexico, North Dakota, Oklahoma, Rhode Island, Texas, Virginia, and Washington."

== Acute stroke-ready hospital ==
An acute stroke-ready hospital (ASRH) is at level 4, the lowest skill level for hospitals designated as stroke centers. To meet this certification, it is required to have "a dedicated stroke-focused program." It must be able to provide basic stroke triage, acute emergency services, and other basic services, as well as coordinating with other stroke facilities for advanced stroke care.

== See also ==
- List of stroke centers in the United States
