= Saint Francis Hospital - Evanston =

Coordinates: 42.024578°N 87.684246°W

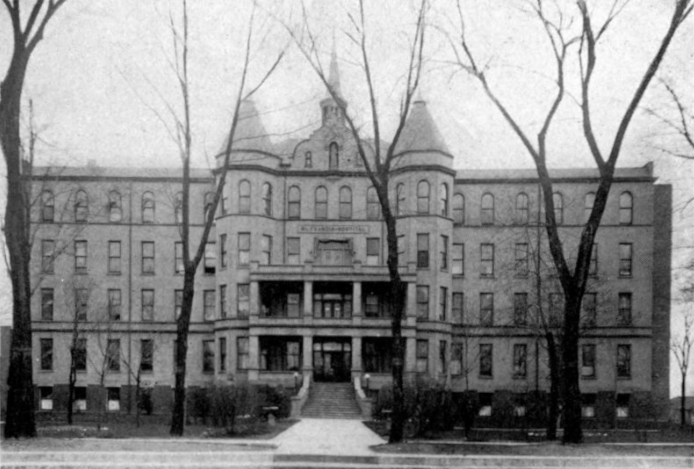
- Saint Francis Hospital in 1922

Geography
- Location: Evanston, Illinois, United States

Organization
- Care system: Prime Healthcare
- Affiliated university: None
- Patron: None

Services
- Emergency department: 24 Hours
- Beds: 197 general Acute care beds

Helipads
- Helipad: No

History
- Founded: Saint Francis Hospital.

Links
- Website: saintfrancisevanston.org
- Lists: Hospitals in the United States

Saint Francis Hospital is a hospital in Evanston, Illinois, a northern suburb of Chicago. Its facilities include a Level 1 Trauma and Heart Center, and it has 270 general acute care beds.

== History ==
In 1900, Saint Francis Hospital of Evanston was founded by the pastor of the nearby St. Nicholas Roman Catholic Church. In 1977, Resurrection Health Care took over Saint Francis Hospital. In 2011 Resurrection Health Care merged with Provena Health to form Presence Health, the hospital was renamed Presence St. Francis Hospital. In 2017, he hospital was renamed AMITA Health St. Francis Hospital when Presence Health merged with AMITA Health.

On October 21, 2021, AMITA Health announced that it would split up, and later on April 1 it officially did. In 2022, the hospital was renamed Ascension St. Francis Hospital. In late July 2024, it was announced that Ascension would sell the hospital to Prime Healthcare. On March 1, 2025, the sale of the Ascension St. Francis Hospital was finalized.
