= Amyloid (disambiguation) =

An amyloid is any of certain insoluble fibrous protein aggregates.

Amyloid may also refer to:

- Amyloid (mycology), a chemical reaction used in characterization of fungi
- Amyloid (journal), the Amyloid: the Journal of Protein Folding Disorders peer-reviewed scientific journal

== See also ==
- Active-matrix organic light-emitting diode (AMOLED), a display technology
- Amyl (disambiguation)
