= Lawreen Connors =

American biochemist (1954–2024)

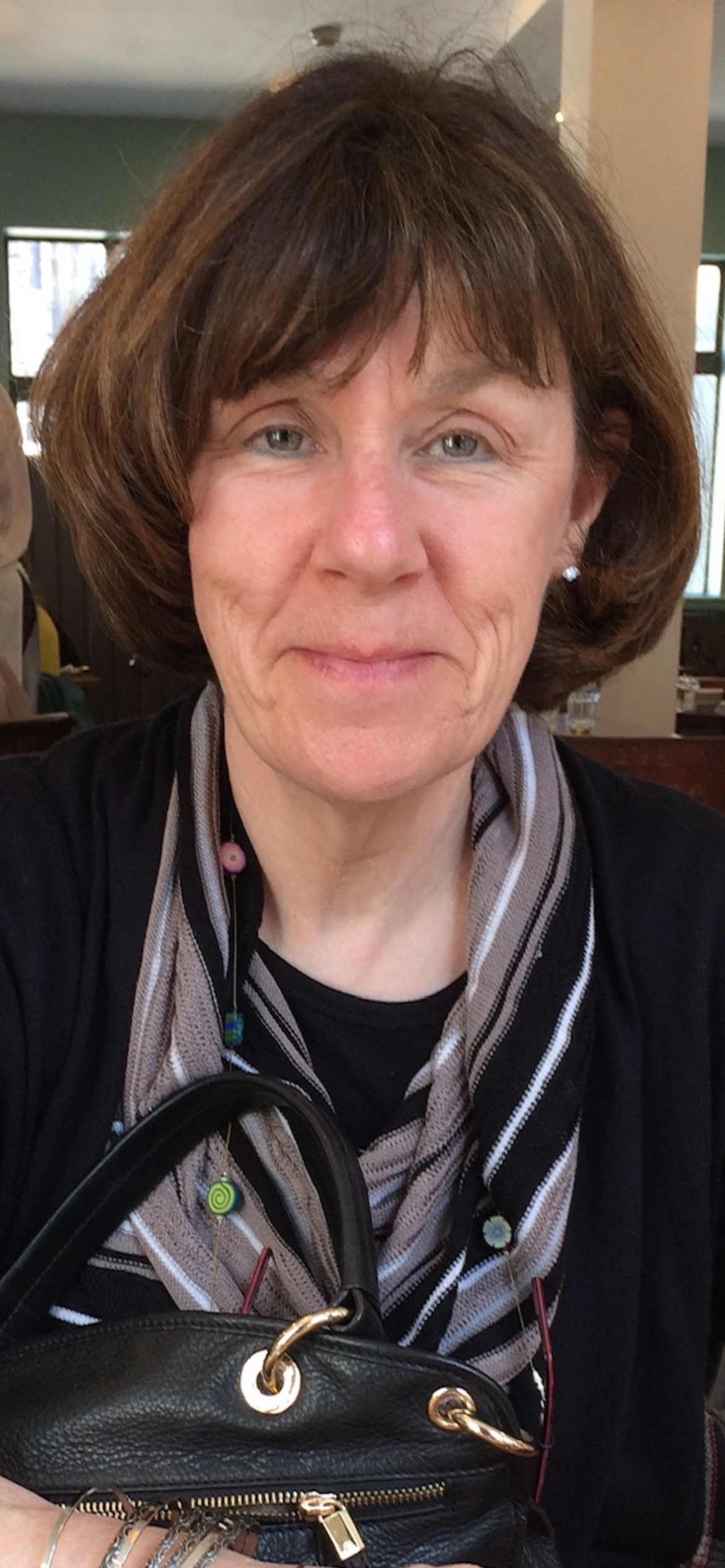
- Connors in 2015
- Born: Lawreen Marie Heller; August 9, 1954; Ogdensburg, New York, U.S.
- Died: October 20, 2024 (age 70); Boston, Massachusetts, U.S.
- Occupations: Biochemist, medical researcher, college professor

Lawreen Marie Heller Connors (August 9, 1954 – October 20, 2024) was an American biochemist, medical researcher, and college professor. She was a professor of pathology and laboratory medicine at Boston University School of Medicine from 1998 until she retired in 2022. Her research focused on the protein amyloid, and the related disease, amyloidosis. She was director of the Amyloidosis Center at Boston University, and co-director of the Amyloid Pathology Diagnostic Testing Laboratory.

== Early life and education ==
Heller was born in Ogdensburg, New York, the daughter of Warren Heller and Helen Amelia Fleming Heller. Her father was a cardiologist. She graduated from Ogdensburg Free Academy in 1972. She graduated from Boston College in 1976, with a double degree in chemistry and mathematics. She completed a master's degree at Tufts University, and a Ph.D. in biochemistry at Boston University.

== Career ==
Connors was a professor of pathology and laboratory medicine at Boston University School of Medicine beginning in 1998. Her research involved studies in the structure and development of the protein amyloid, and the related disease, amyloidosis. She was director of the Amyloidosis Center at Boston University, and co-director of the Amyloid Pathology Diagnostic Testing Laboratory. She was active in the International Society of Amyloidosis. She was named the Charles Brown Professor for Amyloidosis Research in 2020, and retired from Boston University in 2022, as emeritus professor.

== Publications ==
Connors' work was published in academic journals including Archives of Internal Medicine, Biochemistry, Amyloid, Circulation Research, Circulation, Blood, American Heart Journal, American Journal of Physiology, Molecular & Cellular Proteomics, Arthritis & Rheumatology, Journal of Proteome Research, Stem Cell Reports, and Journal of Cardiac Failure. She was also on the editorial board of the journal Amyloid.

== Personal life ==
Lawreen Heller married Michael K. Connors. They had three children and lived in Woburn, Massachusetts. She died from breast cancer in 2024, at the age of 70, in Boston. The Dr. Lawreen Connors Research Scholar Fund was established at Boston University, in her memory.
