= Terry Myerson =

American technology executive (born 1972)

- Born: 1972 (age 53–54)
- Education: Duke University
- Occupations: Truveta Chief Executive Officer Madrona Venture Group Venture Partner The Carlyle Group Operating Executive Microsoft Former Executive Vice President, former head of Microsoft's Windows and Devices Group
- Website: LinkedIn profile

Terry Myerson (born 1972) is an American technology executive who serves as the chief executive officer at Truveta and is a board member of Seattle Sounders FC. Myerson was previously an Executive Vice President at Microsoft, and head of its Windows and Devices Group.

Myerson graduated from Duke University in 1992 and founded Intersé Corporation, which Microsoft purchased in 1997. At Microsoft, he led software and engineering teams behind Microsoft Exchange and Windows Phone before being promoted to lead Microsoft's newly formed operating systems engineering division in July 2013. In March 2018, Myerson announced that he would leave Microsoft after a transition period. In October 2018, Myerson announced his new roles at Madrona Venture Group and The Carlyle Group in a post on his LinkedIn page. Terry Myerson is currently the chief executive officer at Truveta since March 2020.

== Education and career ==
Myerson attended Duke University, where he studied in the college of arts and sciences for a semester before choosing a mechanical engineering major. While in college, he worked as a waiter and as a part-time graphics creator at the Environmental Protection Agency. Upon graduation in 1992, he worked in computer graphics before starting his own company, Intersé Corporation, which made websites and data mining software before being acquired by Microsoft in 1997. Myerson received $16.5 million in stock with the acquisition.

=== Microsoft ===
At Microsoft, Myerson worked in business Internet services and server applications, including Site Server, BizTalk Server, and Windows Management Instrumentation. He joined the corporate email and calendar Microsoft Exchange software team in 2001, which he led for eight years.

He became the head of mobile engineering near the end of 2008, and called a meeting in December that scrapped Microsoft's Windows Mobile product and programming code in favor of a completely rebuilt system designed to better compete with the iPhone. He was promoted to lead the Windows Phone operation in 2011, directly reporting to CEO Steve Ballmer. Myerson restructured the mobile team, and was responsible for hiring Joe Belfiore, who later redesigned the Windows Phone interface. Myerson also connected Microsoft with Nokia's hardware division via a personal relationship with Nokia's executive vice president of smart devices, which grew into Microsoft's biggest Windows Phone partnership.

In July 2013, Myerson was promoted to executive vice president of Microsoft's new operating systems engineering division, which controlled Microsoft Windows as well as Windows Phone, Xbox system software, and various services. The Verge called Myerson "the most important man at Microsoft" after the company's executive reorganization. In 2015, Microsoft merged their Devices Group into the Operating Systems Group to form a new Windows and Device Group which was led by Myerson and which was responsible for Windows operating systems, Xbox system, Windows back-end services and the Surface and HoloLens lineup of hardware products. In March 2018 Microsoft announced it would split the Windows & Devices division into Experiences & Devices and Cloud & AI and that Myerson would leave.

=== Personal life ===
He has a wife and three children. He is a member of the Seattle Foundation Board of Trustees and a member of the Board of Visitors at Duke University's Pratt School of Engineering. His younger brother works at Microsoft.

Myerson organized the purchase of a minority stake in the Seattle Sounders FC of Major League Soccer with 10 Seattle-area families, including Microsoft CEO Satya Nadella.
