= UChicago Medicine AdventHealth La Grange =

- AdventHealth and UChicago Medicine

Geography
- Location: 5101 South Willow Springs Road, La Grange, Illinois, United States
- Coordinates: 41°47′49″N 87°53′11″W

Organization
- Care system: Private hospital
- Type: General hospital
- Religious affiliation: Seventh-day Adventist Church

Services
- Emergency department: Level II trauma center
- Beds: 186

Helipads
- Helipad: Aeronautical chart and airport information for 18IL at SkyVector

History
- Former names: La Grange Memorial Hospital; Adventist La Grange Memorial Hospital; AMITA Health Adventist Medical Center La Grange; AdventHealth La Grange
- Opened: 1955

Links
- Website: www.uchicagomedicineadventhealth.org/uchicago-medicine-adventhealth-la-grange
- Lists: Hospitals in Illinois

Adventist Midwest Health (doing business as UChicago Medicine AdventHealth La Grange) is a non-profit hospital campus in La Grange, Illinois, United States that is part of a joint venture between AdventHealth and UChicago Medicine. The hospital is a primary stroke center and also a designated Level II trauma center by the Illinois Department of Public Health.

== History ==
=== 1955–1998 ===
In 1955, La Grange Memorial Hospital was founded.

On January 10, 1995, Columbia/HCA Healthcare announced that it would purchase La Grange Memorial Hospital. The for-profit hospital network purchased La Grange Memorial Hospital for $155 million.

On August 20, 1998, Adventist Health System announced that it was purchasing La Grange Memorial Hospital from Columbia/HCA Healthcare Corp. In September, Adventist Health System purchased La Grange Memorial Hospital for $155 million. Before the sale Columbia/HCA Healthcare invested $91 million into La Grange Memorial Hospital, and also Loyola Medicine had been interested in purchasing the hospital. After the purchase Adventist Health System upgraded La Grange Memorial Hospital for $40 million, the upgrades were an agreement between Columbia/HCA Healthcare and the Illinois Department of Public Health.

=== 2003–present ===
In early October 2003, La Grange Memorial Hospital announced that it would renovate and expand for $79 million, it would add a five-story, 225,000-square-foot tower. The private patient rooms would be 221-square-foot, doubling the size of the older rooms that were 116-square-foot. At the end of construction the number of beds would stay the same at 223. And the hospitals generator and cooling system would be made bigger. A new parking lot would be built for physicians' demolishing part of the hospital. And also an office building would be demolished and a road by the hospital would be reconstructed.

In early February 2013, Adventist La Grange Memorial Hospital announced that it would purchase two hyperbaric oxygen chambers for its wound care center. To create space for the chambers it would be adding 950-square-foot onto the wound care center, by eliminating four parking spaces. On August 29, the Natural Birthing Center opened one day early, when a woman who was in labour had a water birth at the hospital.

In late June 2014, Adventist La Grange Memorial Hospital got approval from the La Grange village board to expand and renovate its emergency department to 7,000-square-foot. In early October, Adventist La Grange Memorial Hospital had a groundbreaking for its emergency department. The construction was completed in late September 2016 for a total of $10 million. The number of rooms had been increased from sixteen to twenty-four and they had been made private.

On June 17, 2014, Adventist Midwest Health from Hinsdale, Illinois, a subsidiary of Adventist Health System; and Alexian Brothers Health System from Arlington Heights, Illinois, a subsidiary of Ascension Health, signed a letter to create a joint venture company. The nine-hospital company would be the third largest in Illinois. On February 1, 2015, the joint venture AMITA Health was created by Adventist Midwest Health and Alexian Health System.

In late July 2017, AMITA Health applied for a certificate of need with the Illinois Health Facilities and Services Review Board. It wanted to build a two-story 30,000-square-foot expansion for $43 million at AMITA Health Adventist Medical Center La Grange. It wanted to add orthopedics with six operating theaters, cardiac testing and rehabilitation. In early May 2018, the La Grange village board approved the expansion and renovation by 5 to 0, even thou some of the people in the neighborhood were concerned about the traffic the construction would create. In July, Walsh Construction started expansion of the outpatient center at AMITA Health Adventist Medical Center La Grange, a total of 26,000-square-foot would be added to the outpatient center. And also the hospital would have 25,000-square-foot in renovations. In March 2020, Walsh Construction finished the construction for $21 million saving AMITA Health $22 million.

On October 21, 2021, AMITA Health announced that it would split up. On April 1, 2022, it split up and AMITA Health Adventist Medical Center La Grange rebranded to AdventHealth La Grange. On September 13, UChicago Medicine announced that it planned to purchase a controlling interest in the AdventHealth hospitals in Illinois. The joint venture became finalized on January 1, 2023.

== Controversy ==
On June 25, 2018, AMITA Health Adventist Medical Center La Grange reached a settlement with the United States Department of Justice for violating the Americans with Disabilities Act. The hospital had been reported by a man who claimed that he had not been provided an American Sign Language interpreter in 2015.

== Awards and recognitions ==
The hospital received a grade A from The Leapfrog Group from November 2013 to November 2026. The medical facility received from the Centers for Medicare & Medicaid Services a five-star rating from 2020 to 2022, and again from 2025 to 2026. On December 4, 2025, UChicago Medicine AdventHealth La Grange was recognized by Forbes in its new Top Hospitals list with a five star ranking.

== See also ==
- List of Seventh-day Adventist hospitals
- List of stroke centers in the United States
- List of trauma centers in the United States
