= AdventHealth =

American health care system

Adventist Health System/Sunbelt Inc.

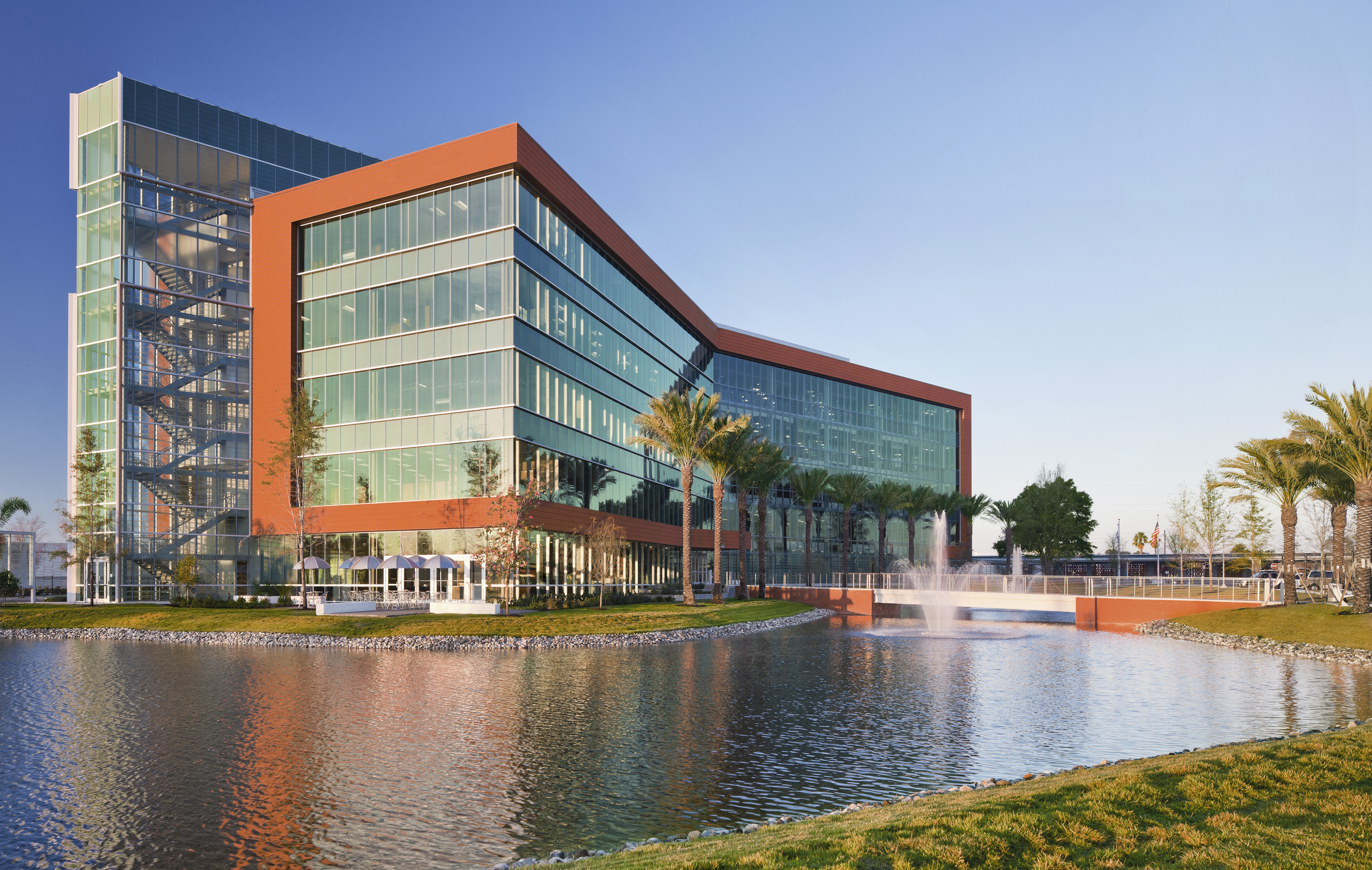
- Mardian J. Blair Administrative Center
- Trade name: AdventHealth
- Formerly: Southern Adventist Health and Hospital Systems, Inc.
- Type: 501(c)(3) Nonprofit organization
- Industry: Healthcare
- Founded: February 15, 1973; 53 years ago, in Orlando, Florida, U.S.
- Founder: Donald W. Welch
- Headquarters: 900 Hope Way, Altamonte Springs, Florida, United States
- Number of locations: 57 hospitals (2026)
- Area served: Colorado, Florida, Georgia, Illinois, Kansas, Kentucky, Missouri, North Carolina, Texas, Wisconsin
- Key people: David Banks (president/CEO, 2025-present)
- Revenue: ▲US$8.31 billion (2024)
- Operating income: ▲US$22.99 million (2025)
- Net income: ▲US$1.45 billion (2024)
- Total assets: ▲US$14.08 billion (2024)
- Number of employees: 100,000 (2025)
- Divisions: AdventHealth Central Florida Division; AdventHealth East Florida Division; AdventHealth West Florida Division; AdventHealth Multi-State Division
- Rating: A (Fitch Ratings), July 2026
- Website: www.adventhealth.com

Adventist Health System Sunbelt Healthcare Corporation (doing business as AdventHealth, and formerly as Adventist Health System initialed as AHS) is an American hospital network. It is headquartered in Altamonte Springs, Florida. It operates healthcare facilities across multiple states. It is the largest Protestant nonprofit organization in the country and is affiliated with the Seventh-day Adventist Church.

AdventHealth is a founding member of Truveta, Coalition for Health AI (CHAI) and the Trustworthy and Responsible AI Network (TRAIN). The hospital network is the Official Health Care Provider for Florida Citrus Sports, Legoland Florida Resort, Orlando Magic, Orlando Solar Bears, Orlando Squeeze and Orlando Valkyries; the Official Health Care Partner for Daytona International Speedway; the Official Health and Wellness Partner for the Tampa Bay Lightning; the Official Medical Provider for runDisney and also Osceola Magic . Other partners of AdventHealth are Dr. Phillips Center for the Performing Arts, Track Shack, USTA National Campus and Walt Disney World.

In 2021, AdventHealth was the second-largest hospital network in Florida. In February 2026, it was listed as the eleventh-largest hospital system nationwide. In July 2026, it was listed as the second largest employer in central Florida. As of October 2026, AdventHealth operates 57 hospitals across nine states, spanning 55 campuses. Becker's Hospital Review and Healthcare Dive, mistakenly exclude AdventHealth for Children and AdventHealth for Women, for they do not have their own separate campus.

On March 19, 2015, Adventist Health System settled a lawsuit that accused it of violating the False Claims Act for $5.4 million, for unsupervised radiation precedures. On September 21, the hospital network settled multiple lawsuits for a total of $118.7 million, that accused it of violating the Stark Law and False Claims Act. It was the largest settlement ever paid by a hospital network for violating the Stark Law. On February 19, 2016, the hospital network settled a lawsuit that accused it of violating the False Claims Act for $2.09 million, after one of its hospitals used leftover chemotherapy drugs. On January 2, 2019, the majority of the medical facilities were rebranded to AdventHealth; excluded were facilities in Colorado, Illinois, and Texas operated through joint ventures.

In March 2022, the hospital network became the first to receive the Emerald Award from the Leapfrog Group, recognizing achievements in healthcare quality and safety. In April, AdventHealth and Ascension dissolved their joint venture AMITA Health. On September 1, the organization announced a rapid diagnostic test to detect Naegleria fowleri, commonly referred to as brain-eating amoebas. In August 2023, AdventHealth and CommonSpirit Health dissolved their joint venture Centura Health. In November 2024, AdventHealth ranked first on Gartner's Healthcare Supply Chain Top 25 list, its first time at the top. In April 2025, David Banks became president and CEO of AdventHealth, replacing Terry Shaw who retired after 40 years with the hospital network. On October 25, 2026, the first telesurgery done between two United States hospitals, took place between AdventHealth Celebration and AdventHealth Minneola.

== Structure ==
AdventHealth organizes its hospitals into four divisions.

Division	President/CEO	Term in office
AdventHealth Central Florida	Brian Adams	?-Present
AdventHealth East Florida	Rob Deininger	May 4, 2025 – Present
AdventHealth West Florida	David Ottati	August 19, 2021 – Present
AdventHealth Multi-State	Andrew Jahn	April 1, 2024 – Present

== Workforce ==
In March 2026, AdventHealth had 3,827 employees in Osceola County, only the School District of Osceola County has more employees. In June, it had 6,500 employees in Seminole County, only Seminole County Public Schools has more employees. In July, hospital network had 3,300 employees in Lake County, only Lake County Schools and Orlando Health has more employees. In September, it had 6,402 employees in Volusia County, on Volusia County Schools has more employees.

== History ==
=== Early history ===
On February 15, 1973, Southern Adventist Health and Hospital Systems, Inc. was founded at Florida Hospital Orlando. The organization unified nine hospitals across the Southern Union Conference, uniting facilities that had operated independently for decades. The system later adopted the name Adventist Health System Sunbelt Healthcare Corporation. They did this after the General Conference of Seventh-day Adventists applied for the trade name Adventist Health System on December 26, 1979.

Mardian J. Blair served as president and CEO of AHS from 1984 until his retirement on January 1, 2000. He was succeeded by Thomas L. Werner.

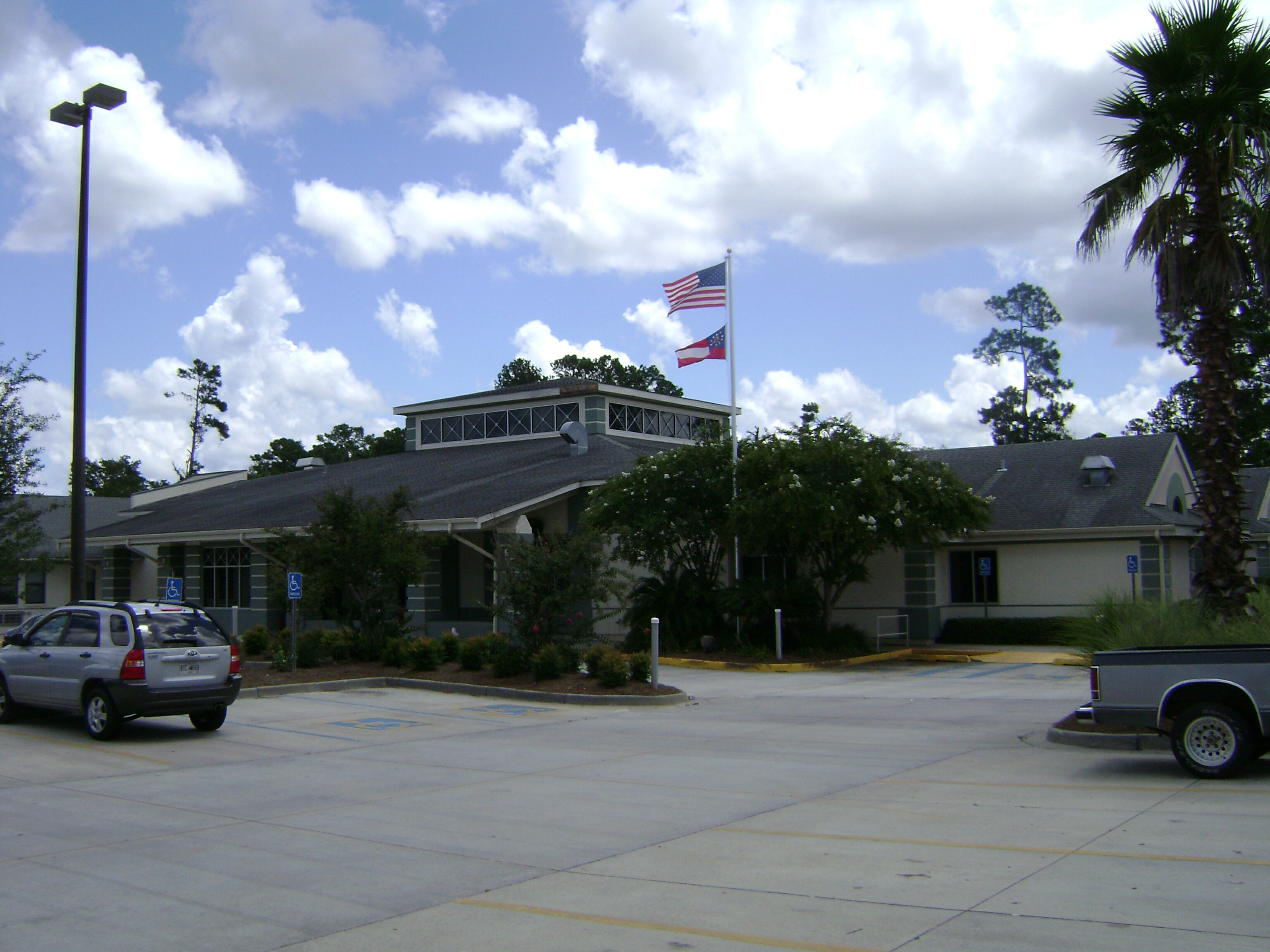
Louis Smith Memorial Hospital

In 1993, Louis Smith Memorial Hospital in Lakeland, Georgia was sold to Lanier Health Services, Inc. In 1996, the Centura Health joint venture was founded by Adventist Health System and Catholic Health Initiatives. On August 1, 2023, Centura Health was dissolved with Avista Adventist Hospital, Castle Rock Adventist Hospital, Littleton Adventist Hospital, Parker Adventist Hospital, Porter Adventist Hospital in Colorado being rebranded to AdventHealth.

In May 1999, AHS withdrew from negotiations to purchase three hospitals in the Tampa Bay area from Tenet Healthcare. The decision followed disagreement over valuation, with Tenet reportedly seeking between $200 million and $250 million.

=== 2005-2019 ===
In November 2005, Werner was succeeded by Donald L. Jernigan. During Jernigan's tenure, the organization relocated its headquarters from Winter Park, to a new administrative campus in Altamonte Springs. The first phase, a five-story office building, opened in 2011 and received a Silver Leadership in Energy and Environmental Design (LEED) certification from the U.S. Green Building Council. The second office building opened in 2013.

On December 20, 2005, HCA Healthcare agreed to purchase from Adventist Health System, Tennessee Christian Medical Center, a medical office building and a therapy center in Madison, Tennessee. As well as Tennessee Christian Medical Center Portland in Portland, Tennessee. On March 31, 2006, HCA Healthcare purchased the properties for $19.7 million.

On April 16, 2012, Adventist Health System joined the Partnership for Patients program from the Centers for Medicare & Medicaid Services. On October 31, 2014, Emory-Adventist Hospital in Smyrna, Georgia closed.

On February 1, 2015, Adventist Midwest Health and Alexian Brothers Health System founded AMITA Health a nine hospital joint venture, the third-largest in Illinois. On April 1, 2022, AMITA Health was dissolved with AMITA Health Adventist Medical Center Bolingbrook, AMITA Health Adventist Medical Center Hinsdale, AMITA Health Adventist Medical Center GlenOaks and AMITA Health Adventist Medical Center La Grange being rebranded to AdventHealth. On May 1, Adventist Health System stopped leasing Jellico Community Hospital, in Jellico, Tennessee after 40 years.

On December 8, 2016, Terry Shaw became president and CEO. On January 5, 2017, Wellmont Health System purchased Greeneville Takoma Regional Hospital in Greeneville, Tennessee from Adventist Health System for $13.5 million.

In 2018, a five-story office building and a seven-story parking garage were completed. On August 14, AHS announced that it would rebrand itself as AdventHealth. At the time it had forty-six hospital campuses and 80,000 employees.

On January 2, 2019, Florida Hospital, Gordon Hospital, Manchester Memorial Hospital, Metroplex Health System, Park Ridge Health and Shawnee Mission Health rebranded to AdventHealth. Its facilities in Colorado, Illinois, and Texas did not change, as they were managed via joint ventures.

On August 28, the hospital network launched a command center. The 12,000 square foot (1,100 m^{2}) facility was built for $20 million on the Orlando campus. GE Healthcare helped build it. At the time it was their largest command center and the second-largest in Florida. Upon opening, Mission Control was staffed by 50 nurses, EMS personnel, flight dispatchers, transport techs, and other specialists. Its mission was better tracking of its patients in central Florida. In November 2019, AdventHealth ended a partnership with University of Central Florida College of Medicine, after it had agreed to become a part owner of a teaching hospital with HCA Healthcare. The partnership with the medical school had started with Florida Hospital in October 2007.

=== 2020-present ===
From 2020 to May 2024, AdventHealth hired 10,000 nurses to fill a predicted future nursing shortage in central Florida. A Nursing Advisory Panel provided input from nurses. The panel asked for more money and to continue nurses' education. AdventHealth invested $140 million to improve pay and education.

On April 1, 2020, the hospital network sold Central Texas Medical Center to Christus Health, which it renamed Christus Santa Rosa Hospital-San Marcos. AdventHealth became a founding member of Truveta, which was launched on February 11, 2021.

==== COVID-19 ====
On March 5, 2020, AdventHealth began treating its first COVID-19 patient. Later that month AdventHealth received $110 million from the CARES Act to pay for employees during the pandemic. In April, the Director of Pharmacy at AdventHealth Ocala developed a pharmacotherapy regime named ICAM to treat patients. In May, the hospital had a 96.4 percent success with it. ICAM is made up of antibiotics, blood thinners, steroids and vitamins. On April 10, AdventHealth opened its first COVID-19 testing site at Daytona International Speedway. On April 14, it opened a testing site at Daytona State College. On April 15, it opened a testing site at The Mall at Millenia. On April 21, it opened a testing site at Seminole Towne Center. On April 22, it opened a testing site at Adventure Island. On April 23, it opened a testing site at Osceola Heritage Park. On April 25, it opened a testing site at Lake-Sumter State College. On April 28, it opened a testing site at Posner Park. On April 29, it opened a testing site at AdventHealth Center Ice. On May 4, all AdventHealth hospitals in the state resumed elective surgeries; all employees and patients were required to get tested, visitors were limited, and everyone was required to wear a mask. On May 16, AdventHealth Central Florida Division terminated its partnership with COVID-19 testing laboratory MicroGen DX after it failed to deliver on time and gave mishandled 60,000 tests, triggering a Food and Drug Administration investigation. On July 28, Governor Ron DeSantis visited AdventHealth Orlando. He praised it for allowing end-of-life visitation unlike many other hospitals. On December 16, AdventHealth Orlando began administering the Pfizer vaccine, vaccinating over 20,000 frontline workers in Orlando and Celebration, Florida in one day. They shared supplies with HCA Healthcare, Nemours Children's Health and Orlando Health. Also on the same day frontline workers were vaccinated at AdventHealth Tampa, five days later the frontline workers at AdventHealth Daytona Beach were vaccinated and six days later frontline workers at AdventHealth Ocala were vaccinated. On December 23, AdventHealth opened a monoclonal antibody outpatient clinic at AdventHealth Orlando. Patients were treated with Casirivimab/imdevimab and Bamlanivimab.

On January 4, 2021, AdventHealth Central Florida Division moved to "yellow status" and two days later to "red status". On January 15, AdventHealth opened a testing site inside of Orlando International Airport at Terminal A. During the first week of March, AdventHealth honored those who lost their lives to the COVID-19 pandemic by having its medical facilities lights blue during the night. By April, geneticists at AdventHealth with the help of California-based Helix, had tested 1,000 patients for COVID-19 variants. On July 22, the division returned to "yellow status". Elective surgeries were deferred, visitors were limited, and everyone was required to wear a mask. On July 26, the division moved to "red status". It began rescheduling non-emergency elective surgeries to increase capacity. On July 30, the division willingly moved to "black status" and stopped doing elective surgeries. On August 19, half of the division's 1,620 patients were under 40. On August 26, it was announced that the morgues at the division were at capacity. Ten of its hospitals rented coolers. AdventHealth blamed funeral homes for the backlog. AdventHealth then ordered 14 portable morgues to hold 168 cadavers. On August 31, the division announced it would return to "red status" on September 1, allowing outpatient surgeries to resume. On September 9, the division moved to "yellow status" and resumed 85-90% of its operations, including surgeries. On September 15, AdventHealth Central Florida Division announced it would move to "green status" on September 16, providing its full set of services.

In October 2021, researchers from AdventHealth Research Institute, Oak Ridge National Laboratory and the University of Tennessee reported that Ondansetron lowered the mortality rate among COVID-19 patients on ventilators. On December 2, AdventHealth stopped requiring its employees to take a COVID-19 vaccine.

In January 2022, AdventHealth began restricting patients to one visitor a day at six Tampa Bay area hospitals, the following month the restrictions were lifted. In March, AdventHealth Orlando opened a clinic to treat patients with Long COVID.

==== 2022- ====
AdventHealth became a founding member of Coalition for Health AI, which was launched in March 2022. In May 2022, AdventHeath sold the vacant lot where Florida Hospital Oceanside once stood for $2.05 million to Ormond Holdings LLC/Blackstream Development LLC. On June 12, 2023, the hospital network exited the nursing home market after selling 8 facilities in Florida, one in Texas, and one in Kansas. In July, the hospital network created an AI Advisory Board to guide its adoption of AI technology.

On March 4, 2024, AdventHealth launched its AirStar 1 helicopter to transport patients from its smaller hospitals to larger facilities. Until then, West Florida relied on third parties. It became a founding member of Trustworthy and Responsible AI Network, which was formed by Microsoft and later launched in March 2024. It also became a founding member of Culinary Health Institute in Orlando.

On April 3, 2025, David Banks became president and CEO. On June 14, the first prostatectomy via transcontiental telesurgery was performed by Vipul Patel on an Angola man.

On March 26, 2026, AdventHealth announced that patient rooms across its hospitals would become camera-equipped smart rooms. AdventHealth Castle Rock and AdventHealth Manchester were the first hospitals to proceed. Some patients considered it an invasion of privacy, even though the cameras do not record. Patients can opt out of the camera technology. The hospital network plans to upgrade its hospitals by end of year. Papers and clipboards normally kept outside patient rooms are to be replaced with digital door signs. On October 25, Patel performed the first telesurgery between two United States hospitals, AdventHealth Celebration and AdventHealth Minneola.

== Recognitions ==
- Gallup Great Workplace Award (2011 to 2017) from Gallup for creating an engaged workplace culture that drives business outcomes.
- CHIME Digital Health Most Wired Award (2013 to 2021) from the College of Healthcare Information Management Executives for improving healthcare with new technology at their facilities. AdventHealth received the award again in 2025, after the organization changed its methodology to include artificial intelligence, climate resilience, cybersecurity, digital pathology, emerging care delivery models and virtual care.
- Emerald Award (2022) from The Leapfrog Group for 24 of its hospitals receiving an A grade, and for 14 receiving a Top Hospital award. Making AdventHealth the first hospital network to receive the award.
- Ranked 288 by Fortune in its America's Most Innovative Companies list (2023) for innovation culture, process innovation and product innovation.
- Ranked first by Gartner in its Healthcare Supply Chain Top 25 list (2024, 2025, 2026)
- Cheers Award (2025) from the Institute for Safe Medication Practices, after its 95 percent compliance with the infusion pump.

== Finances ==
In July 2026, Fitch Ratings gave AdventHealth an A rating.

Year	Revenue	Operating income	Expense	Net income	Total Asset	Total Liability
2011	$2.93 billion		$2.71 billion	$222.70 million	$5.91 billion	$3.95 billion
2012	▲$3.11 billion		▲$2.86 billion	▲$249.98 million	▲$6.29 billion	▲$4.06 billion
2013	▲$3.22 billion		▲$2.93 billion	▲$294.69 million	▲$7.03 billion	▲$4.52 billion
2014	▲$3.55 billion		▲$3.25 billion	▲$299.41 million	▲$7.38 billion	▲$4.60 billion
2015	▲$3.64 billion		▲$3.34 billion	▲$301.97 million	▼$6.85 billion	▼$4.07 billion
2016	▲$3.90 billion		▲$3.53 billion	▲$372.01 million	▲$7.15 billion	▼$3.99 billion
2017	▲$4.08 billion		▲$3.54 billion	▲$535.62 million	▲$7.63 billion	▼$3.93 billion
2018	▲$4.42 billion		▲$3.87 billion	▲$550.14 million	▲$8.11 billion	▲$4.04 billion
2019	▲$4.69 billion		▲$3.99 billion	▲$694.55 million	▲$8.92 billion	▼$4.01 billion
2020	▲$4.82 billion	$12.62 million	▲$4.45 billion	▼$376.24 million	▲$9.56 billion	▲$4.20 billion
2021	▲$5.90 billion	▲$14.88 million	▲$5.14 billion	▲$758.89 million	▲$11.27 billion	▲$5.20 billion
2022	▲$6.25 billion	▲$15.70 million	▲$5.80 billion	▼$443.47 million	▼$11.01 billion	▼$4.98 billion
2023	▲$7.06 billion	▲$16.79 million	▲$6.27 billion	▲$789.53 million	▲$12.36 billion	▲$5.20 billion
2024	▲$8.31 billion	▲$19.81 million	▲$6.85 billion	▲$1.45 billion	▲$14.08 billion	▲$5.37 billion
2025		▲$22.99 million				

== Charity and relief work ==
In September 2019, AdventHealth sent doctors, an architect and a construction manager to The Bahamas after Hurricane Dorian where they helped rebuild Rand Memorial Hospital in Freeport.

In December 2023, the hospital network donated 40 beds to the Ministry of Health and Wellness worth US$120,000 (J$17.4 million), along with Andrews Memorial Hospital and GSI Foundation. The beds went to Spanish Town Hospital and May Pen Hospital in May Pen, Jamaica.

In April 2025, AdventHealth donated 70 beds to the Ministry of Health and Wellness, valued at US$175,000 (J$27.7 million) along with Andrews Memorial Hospital and the GSI Foundation. The beds went to Princess Margaret Hospital in Lyssons and other hospitals in southern Jamaica. In November, the hospital network gave grants totaling $2 million to 8 nonprofits in central Florida that treat mental health issues and provide job training.

== Technology contracts ==
=== Electronic health record ===
In October 2002, Adventist Health System signed a six-year contract with Cerner. In February 2020, AdventHealth announced a switch from Cerner and to Epic Systems electronic health record system for its hospitals, partnering with Virtustream at an eventual cost of $660 million.

=== Renewable energy ===
In February 2024, AdventHealth signed a Virtual Power Purchase Agreement with Scout Clean Energy for 90 megawatts of electricity from its wind farm in Texas totaling 380,000 megawatts of electricity, about 40% of its needs. In March, it hired ESA to install 7,500 solar panels on its office buildings and parking garages and build solar canopies and charging stations for the parking lots. The solar system will produce 4,200 megawatts of electricity and save $20 million over 20 years.

On March 18, 2025, ESA finished its work. In April, AdventHealth subscribed with Orlando Utilities Commission to receive solar energy from its new Harmony II Solar Energy Center east of St. Cloud, Florida.

=== Wireless networks ===
On October 21, 2025, AdventHealth signed a contract with Verizon Business to use its 5G and Neutral Host networks.

=== AI ===
On October 1, AdventHealth physicians, nurses, pharmacists, case managers, therapists and other medical employees began using OpenEvidence. The LLM technology will help reduce time that health professionals spend searching for information, and more time talking to patients and their families.

== Testifying to government ==
On September 20, 2021, Neil Finkler, the chief clinical officer of the AdventHealth Central Florida Division, told the House Health & Human Services Committee that there was a shortage of nurses before the COVID-19 pandemic. Many have left the profession altogether or have accepted $10,000 to become traveling nurses in COVID-19 hot spots around the United States. To alleviate the problem, AdventHealth is requiring nurses to take on additional patients, and looking for a way to get patients out of its hospitals.

On August 3, 2022, Barry Friedman, executive director of the AdventHealth Transplant Institute, told the United States Senate Committee on Finance that the United Network for Organ Sharing had failed many patients. And that it was not dependable, and that the institute had switched to a different company with less expensive, higher-quality trackers.

== AdventHealth Orchestra ==
In July 2020, the AdventHealth Orchestra was founded at AdventHealth Orlando by Richard Hickam. It is made up of sixty employees. The orchestra had its first concert in November 2021, at the Dr. Phillips Center for the Performing Arts, honoring those who died of COVID-19. The AdventHealth Orchestra performed Christmas concerts at Disney Springs and Orlando Union Rescue Mission.

== Brain-eating amoebas test ==
On September 1, 2022, it was announced that physicians at AdventHealth Central Florida Division developed a new five-hour test for brain-eating amoebas. The test detects the three most common amoebas contracted from sources of freshwater. Before the new test, the laboratory specimens from hospitals were preserved and transported to the Centers for Disease Control and Prevention in Atlanta. The Smelski family, who lost their son to a brain-eating amoeba, worked with AdventHealth to develop the test.

== Partnerships and sponsorships ==
=== Seminole County Sheriff's Office ===
On October 24, 2019, AdventHealth and the Seminole County Sheriff's Office announced a partnership to fight the opioid crisis in Seminole County. On March 8, 2021, the AdventHealth Hope & Healing Center opened across from Seminole County Jail in Sanford, Florida. A second treatment center was planned for Altamonte Springs, Florida.

=== Walt Disney World ===
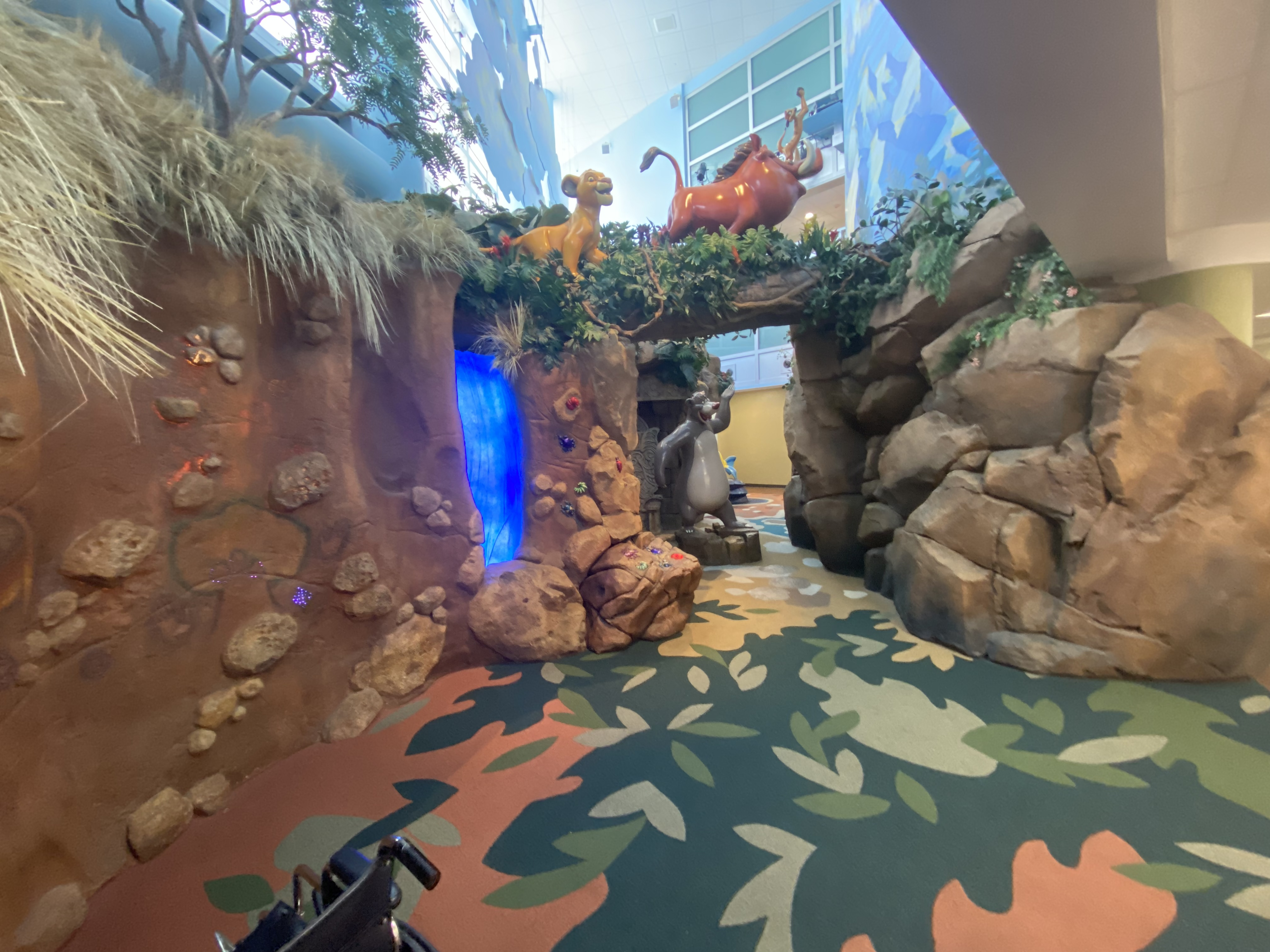
The Walt Disney pavilion at AdventHealth for Children

On May 6, 2021, AdventHealth was chosen by Walt Disney World as its official healthcare provider and its official virtual healthcare provider. AdventHealth opened a 200,000 square feet (19,000 m^{2}) emergency room and primary care facility on Walt Disney World's campus on May 17, 2023.

=== Sport ===
==== Orlando Magic ====
In 1989, Florida Hospital became the Official Healthcare Provider of the Orlando Magic.

In December 2020, AdventHealth became the teams practice jersey sponsor. On May 13, 2021, the hospital network and the Orlando Magic had a vaccination event at the Amway Center, where fans received the Moderna vaccine. On August 31, 2022, AdventHealth and the Orlando Magic opened the $70 million AdventHealth Training Center. 130,000 square feet (12,000 m^{2}) building is located near the Amway Center. AdventHealth's 33,300 square feet (3,090 m^{2}) medical hub treats athletes of all ages. It offers orthopedics, primary care, sports medicine, imaging, rehabilitation, and sports performance services.

===== Magic Gaming =====
In May 2021, AdventHealth became the Official Healthcare Provider and jersey sponsor of Magic Gaming.

==== Tampa Bay Lightning ====
In September 2014, Florida Hospital became the Official Health and Wellness Partner of the Tampa Bay Lightning. Since 2017, Florida Hospital (later AdventHealth) and the Tampa Bay Lightning have been giving away teddy bears to fans at Benchmark International Arena. Teddy bears are also given to sick children with a note from a team fan.

On June 24, 2021, AdventHealth and the Tampa Bay Lightning hosted Shots on Ice, also known as the Take a Shot, at Amalie Arena. Fans had a choice of the Johnson & Johnson vaccine or the Pfizer vaccine, and they took photographs with team mascot ThunderBug. Jill Biden and Anthony Fauci attended.

In September 2024, the hospital network became the team's first jersey patch sponsor, AdventHealth's logo appears on the Lightning's white away jersey. The logo also appears on the jerseys that fans can purchase. AdventHealth also became the founding partner of the 'Patch with a Purpose'.

==== Tampa Bay Buccaneers ====
In August 2018, Florida Hospital became the Exclusive Hospital of the Tampa Bay Buccaneers and has naming rights for the team training facility, the AdventHealth Training Center.

==== NASCAR ====
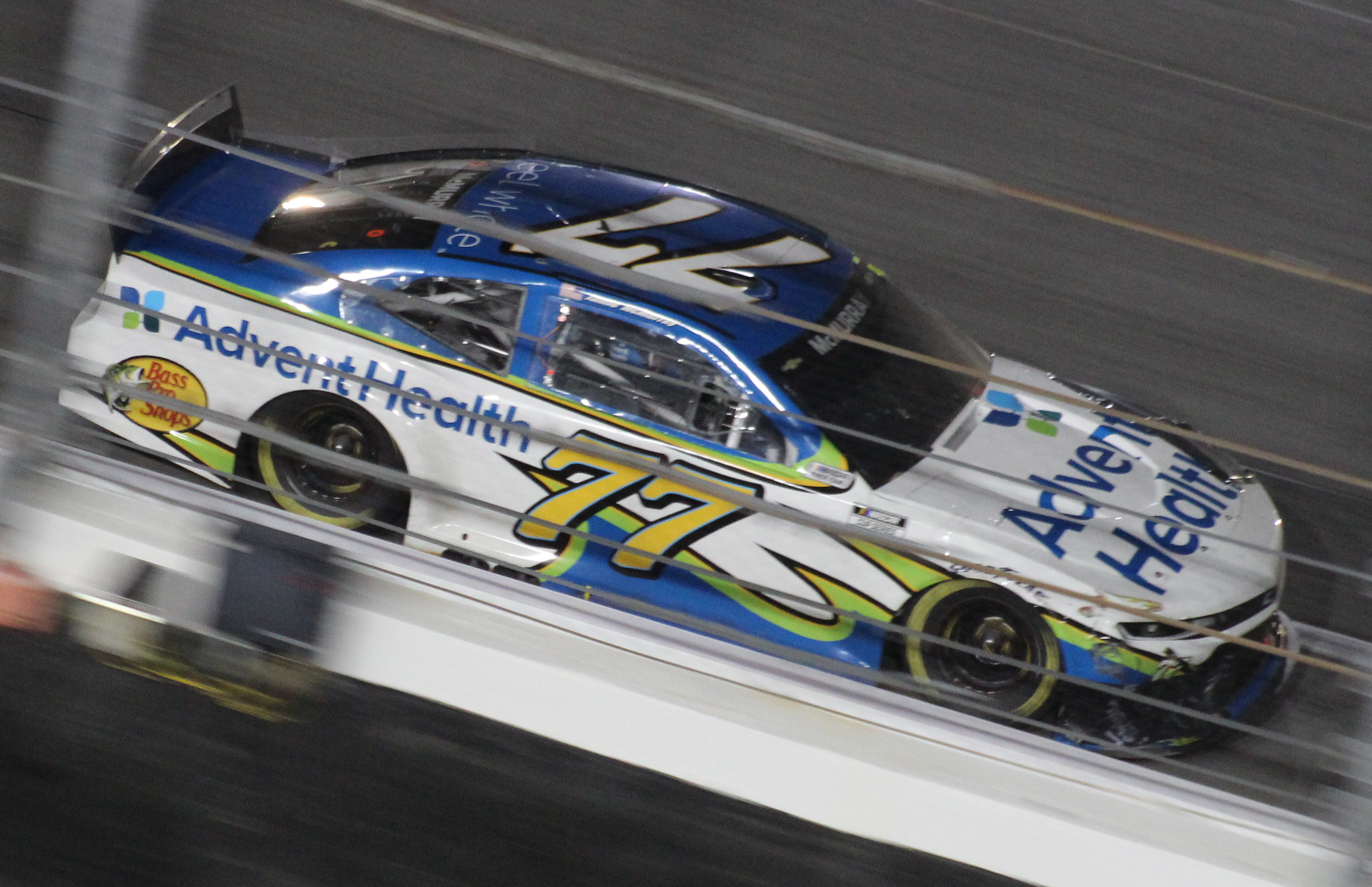
Jamie McMurray racing in the 2021 Daytona 500

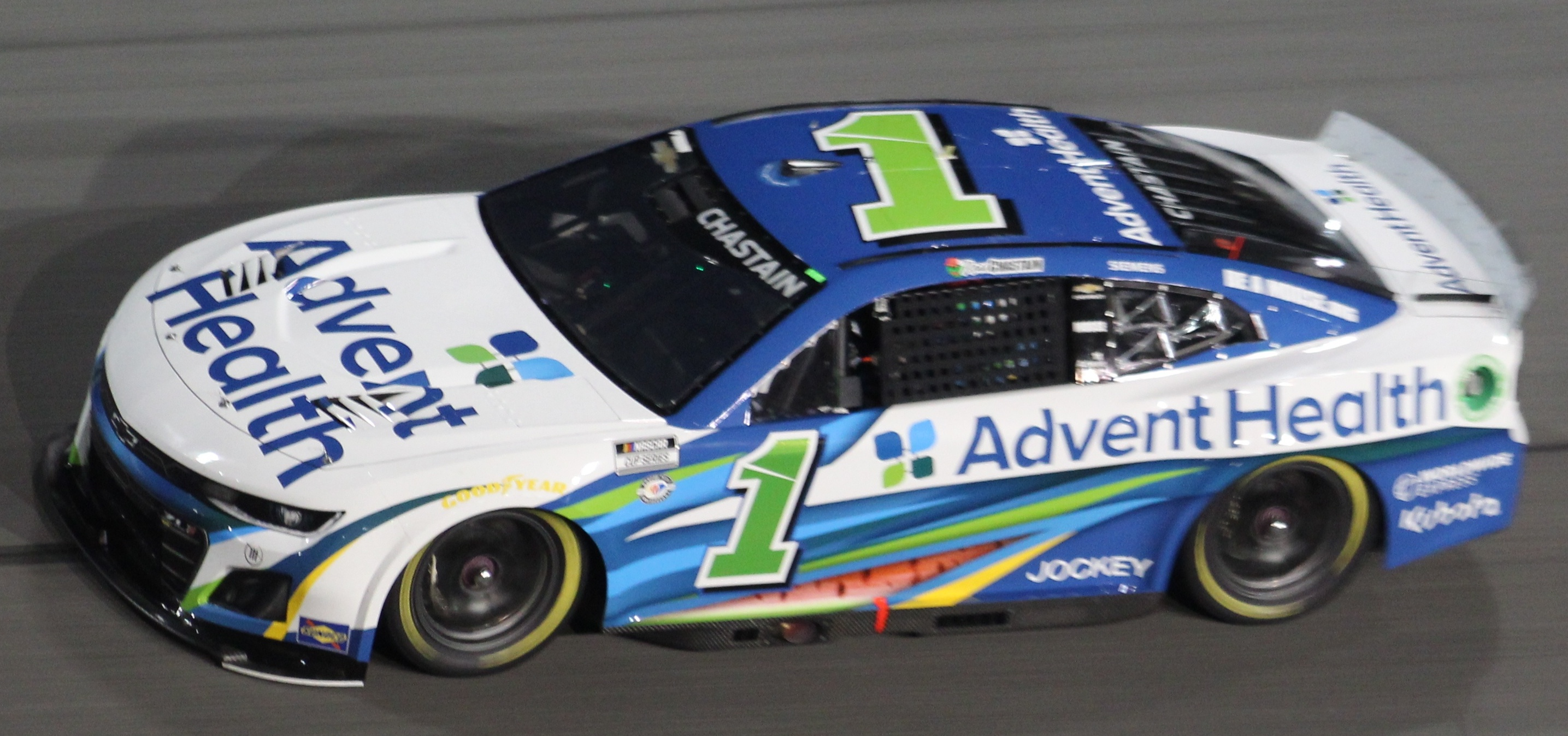
Ross Chastain racing in the 2023 Daytona 500

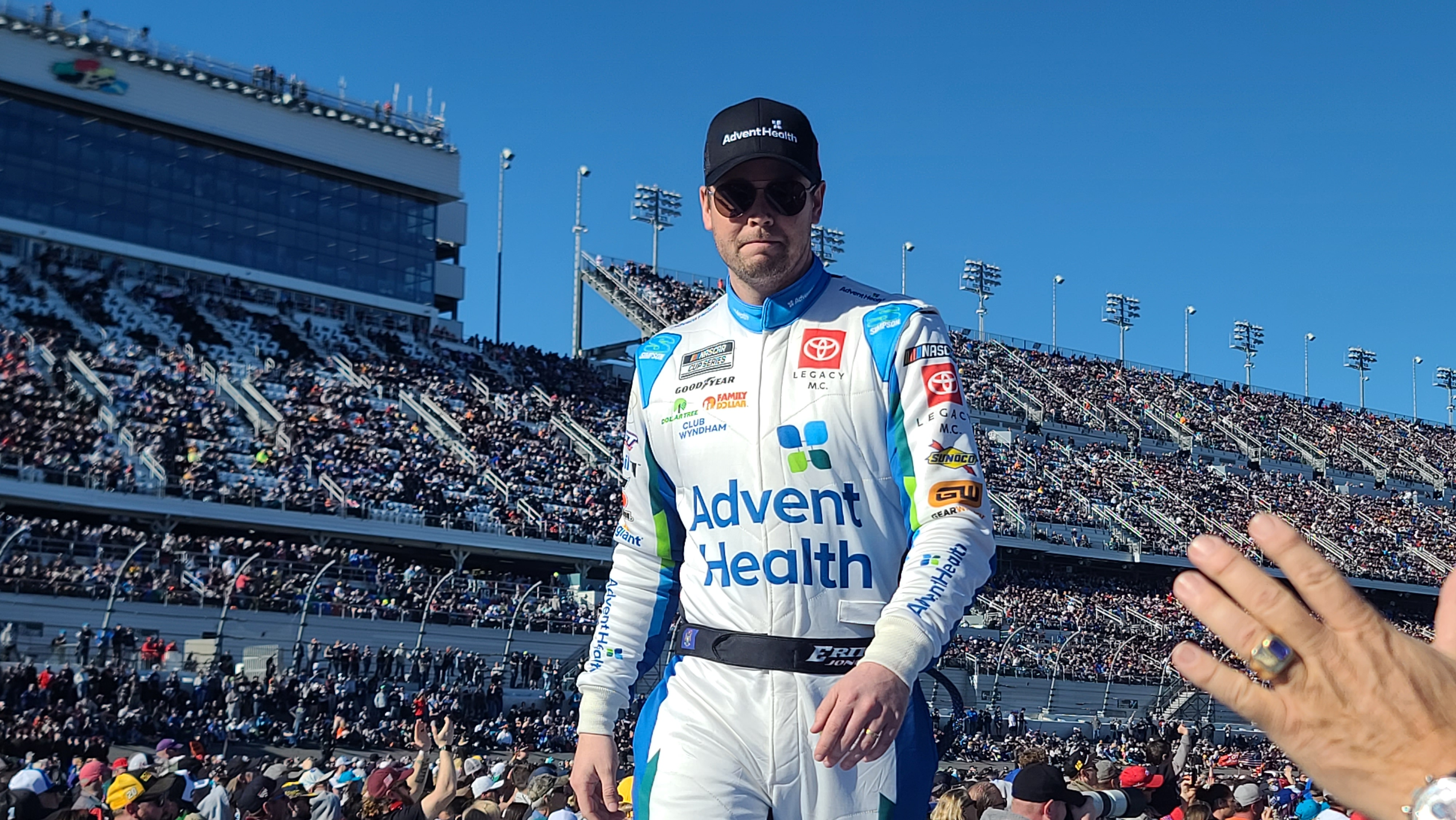
Erik Jones at the 2024 Daytona 500

On October 30, 2014, Florida Hospital became the Official Healthcare Partner of Daytona International Speedway and the second founding partner of Daytona Rising, following Toyota.

On January 1, 2015, Florida Hospital became the track's official sponsor. AdventHealth treats over 1,000 patients there every year at its two care centers and nine first aid stations.

From 2016 to 2020, Florida Hospital and later AdventHealth sponsored Chip Ganassi Racing. In October 2018, Adventist Health System purchased one of the track's injector entrances and rebranded and redesigned it for $1–2 million.

In October 2018, Florida Hospital became the sponsor of Daytona Speedweek. In 2019 and 2021, AdventHealth sponsored Jamie McMurray who, came out of retirement to race at the Daytona 500. At the 2021 Daytona 500 the Grand Marshal SUV was signed by 3,000 AdventHealth workers.

On December 11, 2021, AdventHealth, the NASCAR Foundation, and ONE DAYTONA partnered on a children's vaccination event at ONE DAYTONA. After the children were vaccinated they were given a voucher to local businesses.

On January 11, 2022, AdventHealth became a sponsor of Trackhouse Racing. It severed its sponsorship with Trackhouse Racing after they signed with Busch Beer. In February, the hospital network became a sponsor of Kansas Speedway, and also the sponsor of the AdventHealth 400.

On March 18, 2023, AdventHealth partnered with Hailie Deegan to celebrate Women in NASCAR at Atlanta Motor Speedway. AdventHealth sponsored Legacy Motor Club during the 2024 NASCAR Cup Series season.

On February 13, 2024, AdventHealth it bought naming rights to lactation rooms at Speedweeks. On February 15, the hospital network partnered with Erik Jones and his foundation to donate a bookworm vending machine to Blue Lake Elementary School in DeLand. AdventHealth committed to donate $5,000 a year to fill it with books.

In February 2025, AdventHealth partnered with Jones to donate a bookworm vending machine to Chisholm Elementary School in New Smyrna Beach, and another vending machine to Rymfire Elementary School in Palm Coast on August 22.

In February 2026, the hospital network partnered with Jones to donate a second bookworm vending machine in DeLand, at Edith I. Stark Elementary School, and another vending machine at John A. Crookshank Elementary School in St. Augustine in August.

==== PGA Tour ====
In February 2021, AdventHealth began to sponsor the KC Golf Classic event on the PGA Tour, those who win the event are given a trophy shaped like the AdventHealth butterfly logo.

==== Orlando Guardians ====
In March 2023, AdventHealth became the Official Healthcare Partner of the Orlando Guardians. The team was later dissolved after the XFL, and the United States Football League merged to create the United Football League on December 31.

==== Daytona Tortuga ====
On January 12, 2024, AdventHealth became the Exclusive Healthcare Provider of the Daytona Tortugas. AdventHealth opened a 30,000 square feet (2,800 m^{2}) training center at Jackie Robinson Ballpark on April 2, 2026.

=== Health ===
==== Joint ventures ====
In February 2007, Adventist Health System and University Community Health formed a joint venture to build Wesley Chapel Medical Center.

In 2012, Adventist Health System and Texas Health Resources created a joint venture to own and operate Huguley Memorial Medical Center.

On September 13, 2022, UChicago Medicine announced plans to purchase a controlling interest in the AdventHealth hospitals in Illinois. The joint venture became finalized on January 1, 2023.

On July 21, 2026, AdventHealth and Intermountain Health signed a letter of intent to create a joint venture in the Denver metropolitan area. It would include all five AdventHealth hospitals and their affiliated medical facilities; three Intermountain Health hospitals and their affiliated medical facilities. On August 6, the hospital networks signed a definitive agreement to create it. On November 16, the hospital networks signed a letter of intent to include Saint Joseph Hospital in the joint venture, originally Intermountain Health had planned to find another partner for the hospital.

==== Other ====
In June 2017, Florida Hospital began operating 15 walk-in clinics inside Walgreens in the Tampa Bay area, as Florida Hospital Express Care at Walgreens. After company wide rebranding they were renamed AdventHealth Express Care at Walgreens Locations Currently they go by the name AdventHealth Primary Care + at Walgreens.

In April 2019, AdventHealth and Orlando Hand Surgery Associates signed a joint venture to create The Hand to Shoulder Center which will be on the campus of AdventHealth Orlando. AdventHealth announced a partnership with Helix a genomics company, to create a DNA study named WholeMe, to gather DNA from 10,000 Florida residents. In June, AdventHealth purchased a minority interest in Health First. On October 17, Enterprise Ireland signed a partnership agreement with AdventHealth to allow companies in Ireland access to US markets. AdventHealth could purchase medical devices, diagnostics, healthcare services, software and information technology from Irish companies.

On September 22, 2020, AdventHealth partnered with Rothman Orthopaedics in Florida to build AdventHealth Innovation Tower, a 12-story tall 328,000-square-foot, $170 million headquarters for Rothman Orthopaedics across from AdventHealth Orlando. It began to open in phases beginning in August 2022. On November 23, AdventHealth partnered with Berg Health to create a patient-registration biobank using electronic medical records. Data scientists used AI to treat COVID-19 patients. It was already using Berg technology to treat nonalcoholic fatty liver disease and sarcopenia.

In May 2021, DispatchHealth partnered with AdventHealth to offer home health care in Daytona Beach, Ocala, Orlando, and Kansas City. Patients can receive care via phone, app, website. They can be treated for viral infections, COPD, heart failure, and more.

In February 2022, AdventHealth expanded its partnership with Orlando Neurosurgery. In August, AdventHealth partnered with SpotRx Pharmacy to install pharmacy kiosks at in Hillsborough County and Marion County. The kiosks dispense prescription and over-the-counter drugs.

In October 2023, AdventHealth partnered with Wellvana from Nashville, Tennessee on its AdventHealth Primary Care Network to help transition the network to value-based care for Medicare and Medicare Advantage patients in Florida. Wellvana agreed to send care coordinators pharmacists and social workers to AdventHealth's clinics to help patients get better access to healthcare workers, improve scheduling, care coordination, continued education, support on HEDIS, quality and risk adjustment.

On February 28, 2024, AdventHealth and Medline Inc. announced the opening of a 375,000 square feet (34,800 m^{2}) distribution center in Apopka. In December 2025, the hospital network purchased it for $84.25 million; the facility employs about 250 workers. In September 2024, AdventHealth partnered with OurLegacy to open its first organ donation center in Orlando.

On May 18, 2026, AdventHealth announced that it would use CelLBxHealth's technology in two clinical cancer trials.

=== Education ===
==== Volusia County School District ====
In June 2018, Volusia County Schools began a $2 million, five-year partnership with Florida Hospital. Fifteen health middle school and high school services academies and programs were renamed . Students are taught biomedical sciences, sport science and emergency medical technician/paramedic classes for future jobs in the medical field.

In 2019, AdventHealth donated tablet computers and printers to schools with the highest levels of student truancy. The tablet computers are equipped with the hospital network's eCare app, which allows sick students and their parents to video chat with a physician or nurse.

As of 2024, AdventHealth had provided 5,200 free sports physicals and 4,300 free cardiac screenings to students along with $12,000 of medical supplies.

==== Flagler County School District ====
In 2021, AdventHealth and Flagler County Schools signed a $750,000, 5-year partnership. AdventHealth offers mental health treatment athletic trainers for Flagler Palm Coast High School and Matanzas High School. The school district will pay AdventHealth $150,000 over five years for the trainers. In return the hospital network would pay the school district $10,000 for five consecutive years.

==== University of Central Florida College of Nursing ====
On June 22, 2023, AdventHealth pledged to donate $5 million for a new nursing facility at University of Central Florida College of Nursing.

==== Georgia Northwestern Technical College ====
On July 28, 2025, AdventHealth donated of $830,000 to Georgia Northwestern Technical College, to help the college expand its associate degree nursing program given over five years.

== Lawsuits ==
In July 1993, Adventist Health System sued Columbia Hospital Corporation to keep it from acquiring Galen Healthcare, for they did not want it to have a monopoly by owning two hospitals in Kissimmee, Florida. In August, the lawsuit was settled when Columbia Hospital Corporation, sold Kissimmee Memorial Hospital to Florida Hospital; and sold Willow Creek Hospital in Arlington, Texas to Adventist Health System.

In December 2012, three whistleblowers at Park Ridge Health sued Adventist Health System for fraud. Later in 2013, a former senior executive sued. The hospital network was accused of violating the Stark Law and the False Claims Act. The United States Department of Justice, Government of North Carolina, Government of Florida, Government of Tennessee and Government of Texas then intervened. On September 21, 2015, Adventist Health System agreed to settle for $118.7 million, with $115 million going to the United States government. While $3.48 million went to Florida, $198,453 to North Carolina, $66,897 to Tennessee and $4,711 to Texas. This settlement was the largest that a hospital network has ever paid for violating the Stark Law.

In January 2013, a whistleblower sued Adventist Health System in a Tampa court, accusing it of violating the False Claims Act, by not supervising patients receiving radiation therapy. Later the United States Department of Justice intervened and the hospital network settled the lawsuit for $5,412,502 on March 19, 2015; the whistleblower received $1,082,500 of the settlement. In February, a whistleblower sued Adventist Health System for violating the False Claims Act. Later the United States Department of Justice intervened and the hospital network settled the lawsuit for $2.09 million on February 19, 2016; the whistleblower received $376,452 of the settlement. At the end of the lawsuit it did not have to pay the full amount, since Florida Hospital had reimbursed the federal government $819,828.82 in January 2012, after it had found out that Florida Hospital East Orlando had used leftover chemotherapy drugs on patients from 2007 to 2011. On April 9, a former patient sued Adventist Health System, in United States District Court for the Middle District of Florida - Orlando Division; claiming that Florida Hospital had failed in its obligation to protect patients medical records, and for failing to properly train and monitor its employees. On July 3, district judge Roy B. Dalton Jr. dismissed the lawsuit, since it was not in the jurisdiction of the federal court. It was later refiled at the Orange County Courthouse.

In 2015, Mid Florida Cancer Center sued Florida Hospital, for anti-competitive conduct in Flagler County and Volusia County. In October 2020, a judge ruled that AdventHealth violated Florida's antitrust law.

On October 28, 2016, an employee sued Adventist Health System, in United States District Court for the Middle District of Florida - Orlando Division; accusing it of violating the Employee Retirement Income Security Act by underfunding pension plans by $134 million. The hospital network claimed it did not have to follow the ERISA, since they are a religious organization and instead give church plans. In March 2019, district judge Gregory A. Presnell considered the lawsuit convoluted and a waste of his time. In January 2020, he dismissed it without prejudice.

On October 25, 2017, a residency physician from Kenya sued Florida Hospital for violating the Florida Civil Rights Act by discriminating against him because of his race, national origin, disability and for retaliating after he was dismissed from the residency program. The jury awarded the plaintiff $2.75 million, but circuit judge Kevin Weiss overturned the verdict. After the reversal the hospital network asked the judge to have the allegations overturned as frivolous; and that the plaintiff pay their attorney fees and other filing costs.

On August 30, 2019, AdventHealth was sued by Oviedo Medical Center for trademark infringement, unfair competition and cybersquatting. Oviedo Medical Center claimed that the name for AdventHealth's new ER would confuse the public. The judge dismissed the suit on technical grounds. Oviedo refiled. On December 20, 2020, the lawsuit was settled and its ER was renamed AdventHealth ER.

On May 28, 2020, AdventHealth sued California attorney Michael Weiss, his law firm, Tomax Capital Management Inc. and its CEO Yehoram Efrati in United States District Court for the Middle District of Florida - Orlando Division. After failing to deliver 10 million N95 respirators to the hospital network valued at $57.5 million. AdventHealth asked Weiss to return the money; he returned only $55.5 million and told AdventHealth that Tomax Capital Management Inc. had the remaining funds. AdventHealth claimed that the defendants knew the masks were unavailable and conspired to keep the money. A federal judge dismissed the suit against Weiss and his firm, after they agreed to resolve the claims. On May 12, 2021, district judge Paul G. Byron ruled in favor of AdventHealth after Tomax Capital Management Inc. failed to make its first payment of $300,000, to AdventHealth.

On August 10, 2023, AdventHealth sued MultiPlan in United States District Court Southern District of New York, in court it said this:

"The money that MultiPlan and competing payers withhold from healthcare providers does not go to patients; it goes to insurance companies, their investors and their executives."

The hospital network claimed that it had proof that MultiPlan had cheated hospitals and doctors out of $19 billion per year; and that the anti-competitive conduct cost AdventHealth hundreds of millions violated the Sherman Antitrust Act. In June 2025, the lawsuit was moved to the United States District Court for the Northern District of Illinois, to consolidate the multiple lawsuits against MultiPlan. And district judge Matthew Kennelly approved the lawsuits.

== Florida investigation ==
On May 30, 2025, James Uthmeier sent subpoenas to AdventHealth and other hospital networks, claiming they were violating Florida law and federal transparency rules, by deliberately overbilling; and because Donald Trump had signed an executive order requiring the United States Department of Treasury, the United States Department of Labor, and the Department of Health and Human Services to enforce healthcare price transparency regulations.

In June 2026, The Centers for Medicare & Medicaid Services did not include AdventHealth hospitals on its list of hospitals that were in violation.

== Facilities ==
=== Hospitals ===
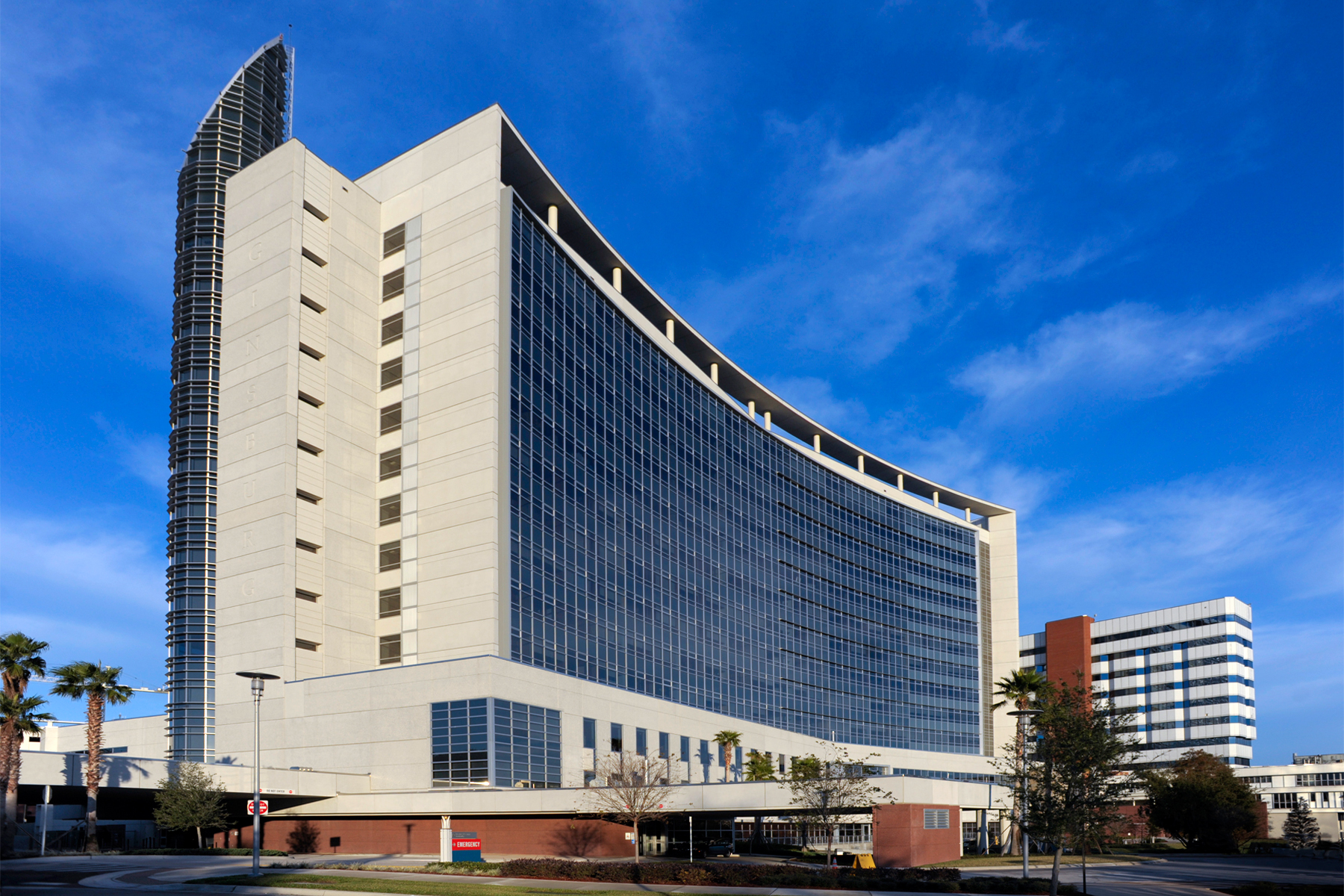
Florida Hospital Orlando in 2010, before it rebranded in 2019 to AdventHealth Orlando

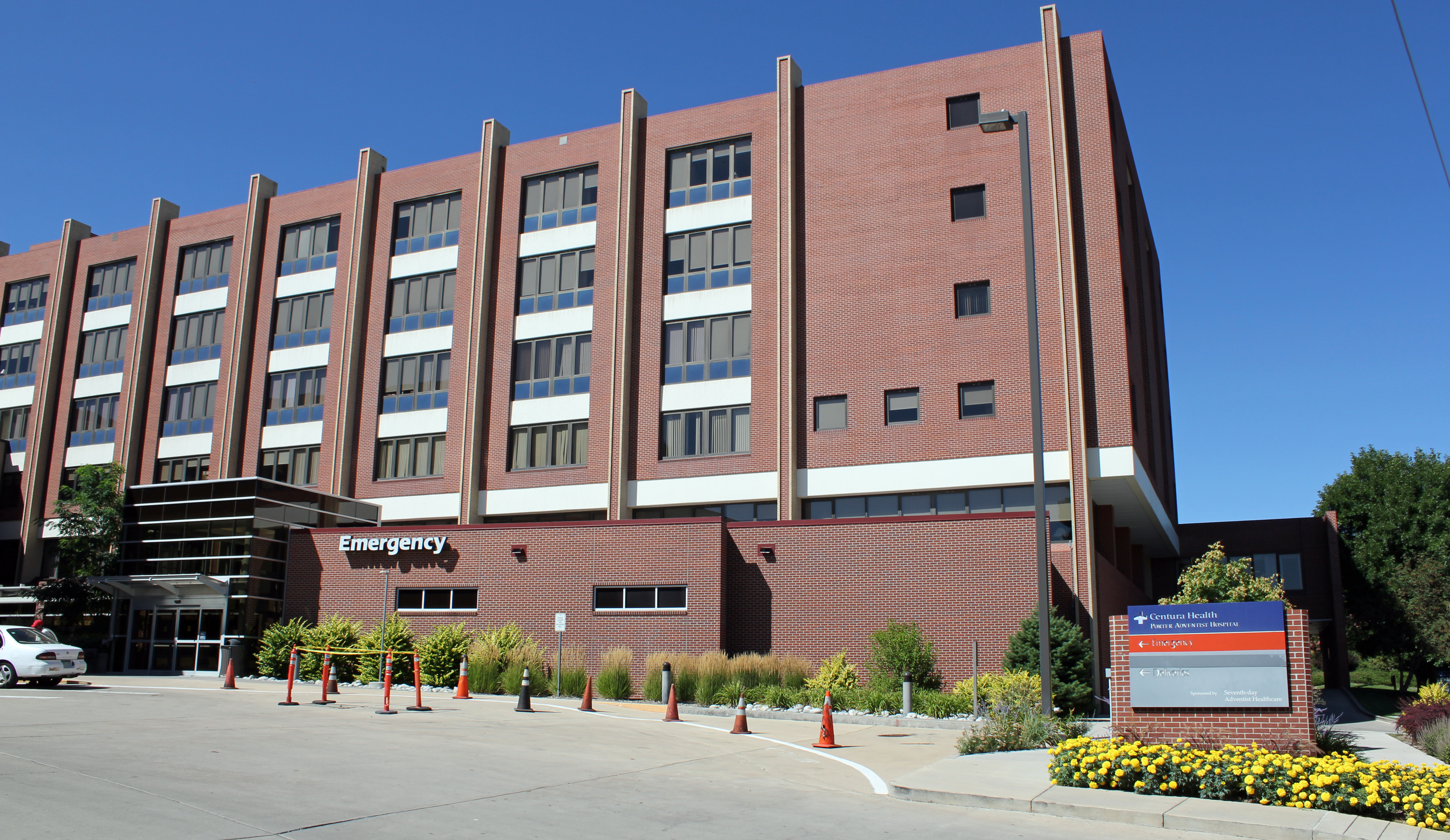
Porter Adventist Hospital in 2011, before it rebranded in 2023 to AdventHealth Porter

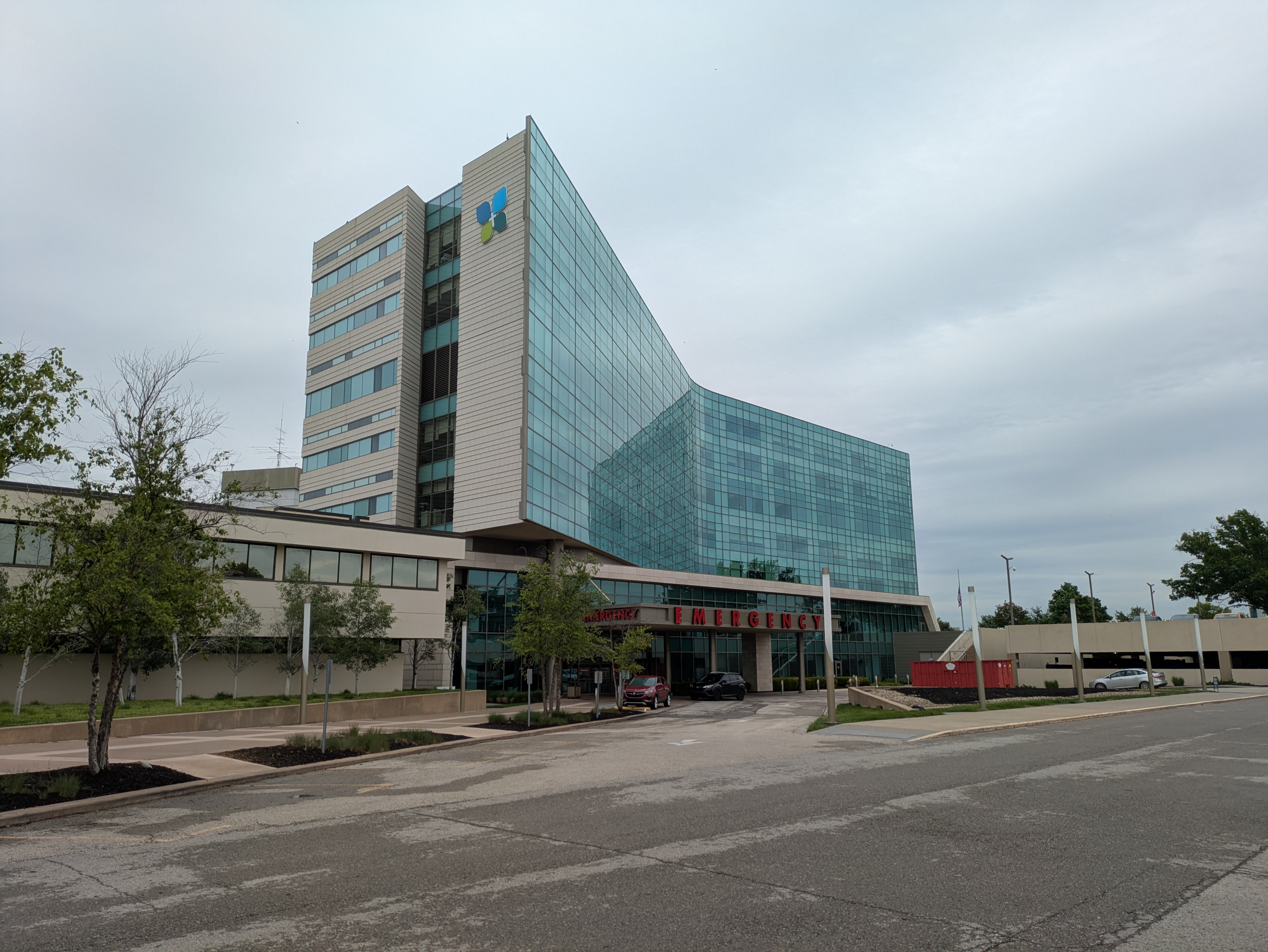
AdventHealth Shawnee Mission emergency department entrance in 2024

AdventHealth Orlando is Florida's second largest hospital, and the largest in Central Florida, it also was the third largest hospital in the United States in 2023. Their second largest Florida hospital is AdventHealth Tampa, it is also the fifth largest hospital in the Tampa Bay area. AdventHealth Daytona Beach is their third largest hospital in Florida, it is also the second largest hospital in the Deltona-Daytona Beach-Ormond Beach metropolitan area.

AdventHealth Porter is the largest hospital owned by AdventHealth in Colorado and the state's ninth largest. AdventHealth Shawnee Mission is the largest hospital owned by AdventHealth in Kansas. AdventHealth Redmond is the largest hospital owned by AdventHealth in Georgia.

=== Other facilities ===
In 1992, AdventHealth University was founded as Florida Hospital College of Health Sciences at Florida Hospital Orlando. Its original campus is in Orlando, with a second campus in Denver and a third in Tampa.

In November 2025, AdventHealth Medical Group opened a clinic in St. Johns County, Florida, the county's first medical facility owned by AdventHealth.

=== Mergers and acquisitions ===
==== 1997–2002 ====
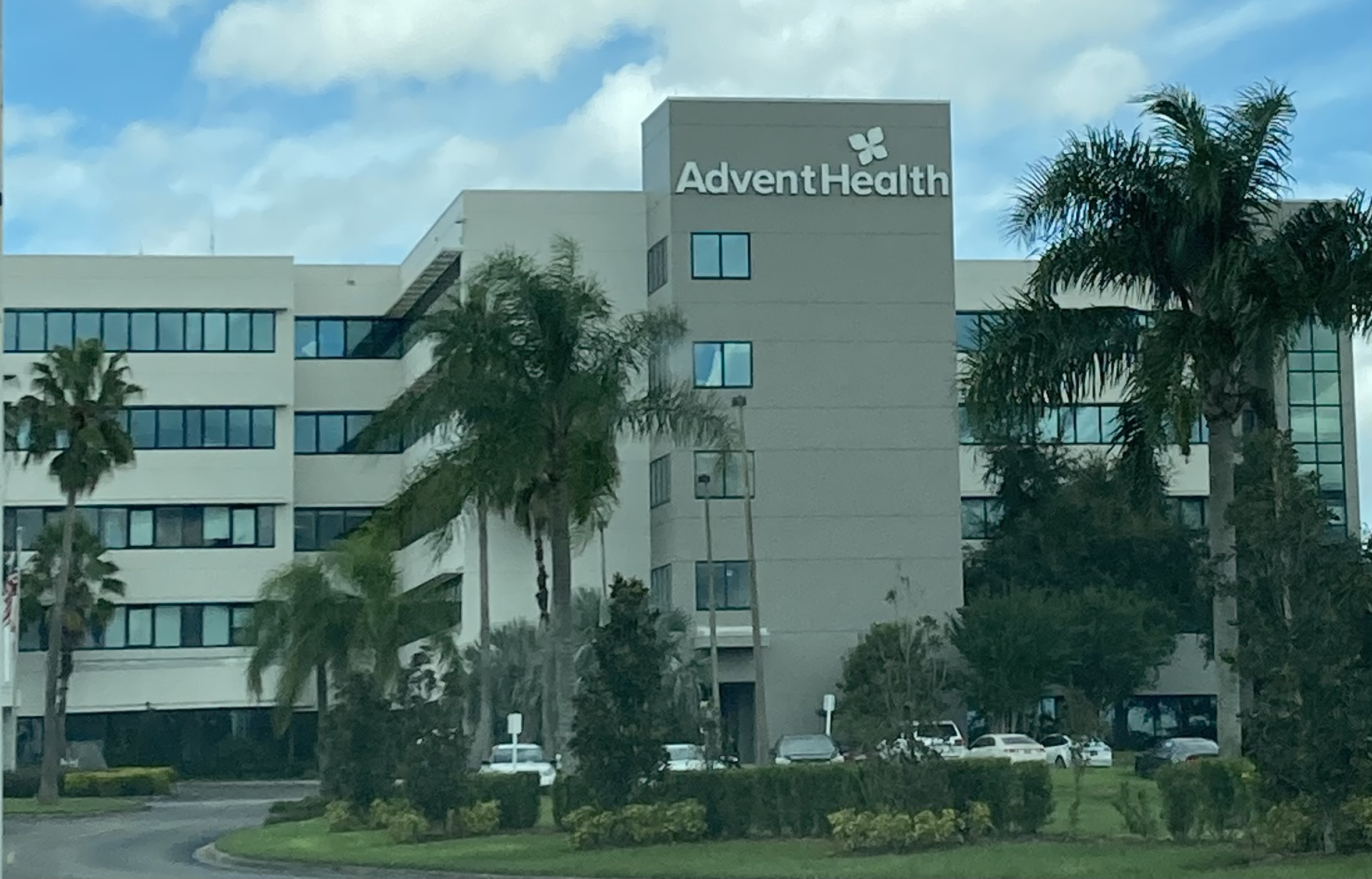
AdventHealth Heart of Florida in 2023

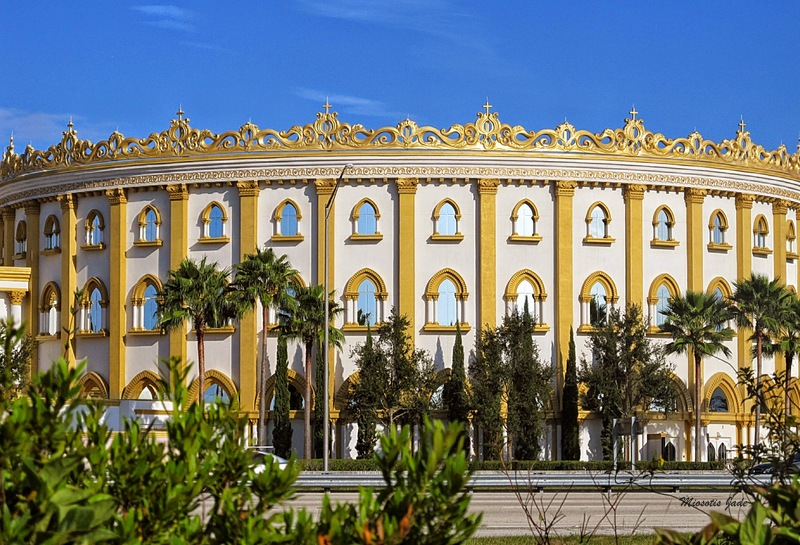
The colosseum at Holy Land Experience before being demolished in 2023

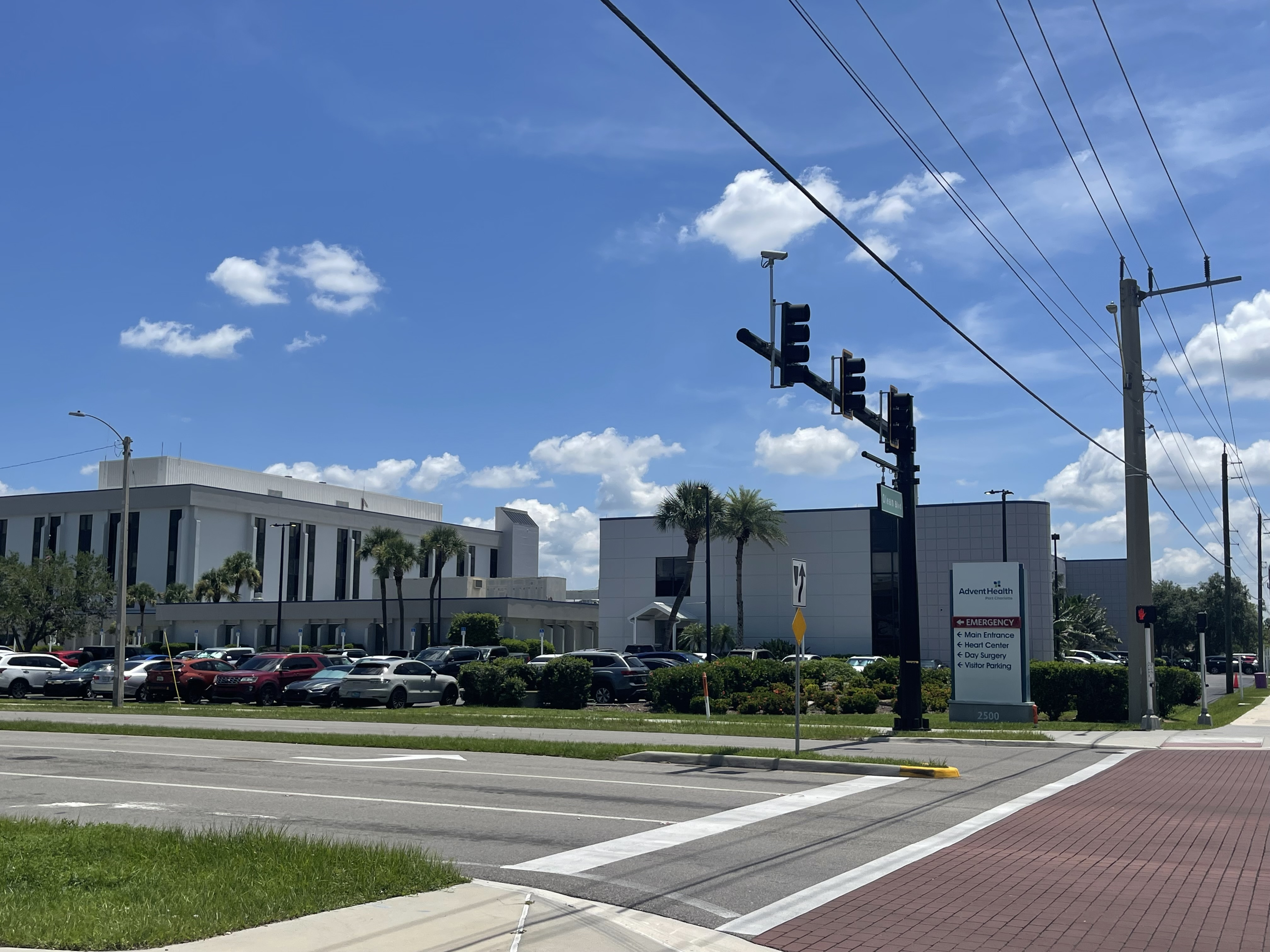
AdventHealth Port Charlotte in 2025

In May 1997, Hinsdale Health System in Hinsdale, Illinois merged with Adventist Health System. In September 1998, Adventist Health System purchased La Grange Memorial Hospital from Columbia/HCA Healthcare for $155 million.

In May 2000, Memorial Health Systems chose to merge with Adventist Health System, since it needed money to replace a hospital campus. On October 1, 2001, PorterCare Adventist Health System merged with Adventist Health System Sunbelt Healthcare Corporation. In October 2002, Shawnee Mission Medical Center split from Saint Luke's Health System and joined Adventist Health System.

==== 2010–2019 ====
On September 1, 2010, University Community Health merged with Adventist Health System, due to being $220 million in debt.

In April 2018, Adventist Health System purchased Bayfront Health Dade City, renaming it Florida Hospital Dade City; and a forty-year lease on Munroe Regional Medical Center from Community Health Systems, renaming it to Florida Hospital Ocala August 1.

On September 1, 2019, AdventHealth purchased Heart of Florida Regional Medical Center and Lake Wales Medical Center from Community Health Systems for $100 million, renaming them AdventHealth Heart of Florida and AdventHealth Lake Wales. Also the same month it purchased a freestanding emergency department in Winter Garden for $9.6 million; and the Family Medicine Clinics in Copperas Cove and Lampasas, Texas.

==== 2020–present ====
In October 2020, AdventHealth purchased Exodus Women's Center medical offices in Hillsborough and Polk Counties and its administrative office in Tampa. And in December, it also purchased AdventHealth Murray from the Murray County Hospital Authority Board.

On October 1, 2021, AdventHealth purchased Redmond Regional Medical Center and its businesses, physician clinic operations, outpatient services and equity interests from HCA Healthcare for $635 million and renamed it AdventHealth Redmond. On August 2, it also acquired Holy Land Experience from Trinity Broadcasting Network for $32 million.

In April 2024, it purchased the AdventHealth Championship.

On March 1, 2025, AdventHealth purchased ShorePoint Health in Southwest Florida from Community Health Systems for $260 million. In April, it purchased the medical office building Upshot Medical Center for $60 million. On July 2, it purchased Bond Clinic in Winter Haven, who they had a partnership with since October 2021. On October 1, AdventHealth purchased the GenesisCare clinics in North Carolina, they were later rebranded to AdventHealth Medical Group Radiation Oncology; it also purchased Asheville Urological Associates. In November, it purchased The Family Medicine Clinic in Cartersville, Georgia.

== See also ==
- AdventHealth Arena
- AdventHealth Field
- AdventHealth Nicholson Center
- AdventHealth Stadium
- AdventHealth station
- Audrey Gregory
- Jeffrey Kuhlman
- Vipul Patel
