= AdventHealth Hendersonville =

- AdventHealth

Geography
- Location: 100 Hospital Drive, Hendersonville, North Carolina, United States
- Coordinates: 35°23′24″N 82°29′18″W

Organization
- Care system: Private hospital
- Type: General hospital
- Religious affiliation: Seventh-day Adventist Church

Services
- Standards: Joint Commission
- Emergency department: Yes
- Beds: 103

Helipads
- Helipad: No

History
- Former names: Mountain Sanitarium; Mountain Sanitarium and Hospital; Fletcher Hospital; Park Ridge Hospital; Park Ridge Health
- Opened: 1910

Links
- Website: www.adventhealth.com/hospital/adventhealth-hendersonville
- Lists: Hospitals in North Carolina

Fletcher Hospital, Inc. (doing business as AdventHealth Hendersonville) is a non-profit hospital campus in Hendersonville, North Carolina owned by AdventHealth. The medical facility is a tertiary and psychiatric hospital that has multiple specialties.

== History ==
In 1910, Mountain Sanitarium was founded. In 1927, its name was changed to Mountain Sanitarium and Hospital. In 1976, Mountain Sanitarium and Hospital changed its name to Fletcher Hospital. And then Fletcher Hospital changed its name to Park Ridge Hospital. In 1984, Park Ridge Hospital was acquired by Adventist Health System. In late June 2010, Park Ridge Hospital changed its name to Park Ridge Health, due to many of their services not being offered at the hospital.

In 2012, three whistleblowers at Park Ridge Health sued Adventist Health System for fraud. When the lawsuit was filed the United States Department of Justice, Government of North Carolina, Government of Florida, Government of Tennessee and Government of Texas intervened. Adventist Health System agreed to settle the lawsuits for a total of $118.7 million on September 21, 2015.

On April 6, 2013, Park Ridge Health announced that it would build a medical center in south Asheville, North Carolina at Biltmore Park for $10 million. The four-story, 25,000 square foot (2,300 m^{2}) medical center will be close to Interstate 26. It planned on consolidating six locations. On April 9, Park Ridge Health had a groundbreaking for its medical center. On September 4, 2014, there was a grand opening for Park Ridge Health South Asheville.

On June 20, 2014, Park Ridge Health purchased a movie theater which was vacant for five years and surrounding land for $1.8 million. To build a new medical campus to consolidate its physician offices and outpatient services. On December 15, demolition began on the movie theater.

On August 14, 2018, it was announced that Park Ridge Health would be rebranding its name to AdventHealth Hendersonville on January 2, 2019.

On October 10, 2023, the hospital had a groundbreaking for a 60,000 square foot (5,600 m^{2}) medical office building.

In late March 2026, AdventHealth Hendersonville opened the counties first Level II Neonatal Intensive Care Unit.

== Services ==
In late December 2018, Park Ridge Health was awarded a grant from The Duke Endowment for $730,000. It provided funding for the Phoenix Project, to help women who are victims of sexual assault, domestic violence and human trafficking.

== Controversy ==
In early August 2023, AdventHealth Hendersonville was fined by the North Carolina Department of Health and Human Services, and by the Centers for Medicare & Medicaid Services, for refusing to allow a behaviour therapy patient to see an advocate.

== Partnerships and sponsorships ==
In early August 2018, Park Ridge Health created a partnership with Wake Forest Baptist Medical Center to allow their physicians to fill job openings at Park Ridge Health. The partnership was created due to more patients at the hospital.

In early July 2023, AdventHealth Hendersonville announced a partnership with Mountain Area Pregnancy Services. At the MAPS location in Asheville, their clients will be able to see an AdventHealth certified nurse-midwife. In late October, AdventHealth Hendersonville announced that it was sponsoring the Ecusta Trail. The 19.4 miles (31.2 km) biking/hiking trail is being constructed on an old railroad track that had been owned by Norfolk Southern Railway between Hendersonville and Brevard, North Carolina.

== Awards and recognitions ==
The hospital received a grade B from the Leapfrog Group in fall 2013 and spring 2014. It received a grade A in fall 2014 and spring 2015, the hospital received it again from November 2016 to May 2026. In 2021, it was the only hospital in western North Carolina to be designated a top general hospital by The Leapfrog Group. It was recognized again in 2022

In 2024, AdventHealth Hendersonville received a 5-star rating from the Centers for Medicare & Medicaid Services.

== See also ==
- List of Seventh-day Adventist hospitals
