= AdventHealth for Children =

- AdventHealth

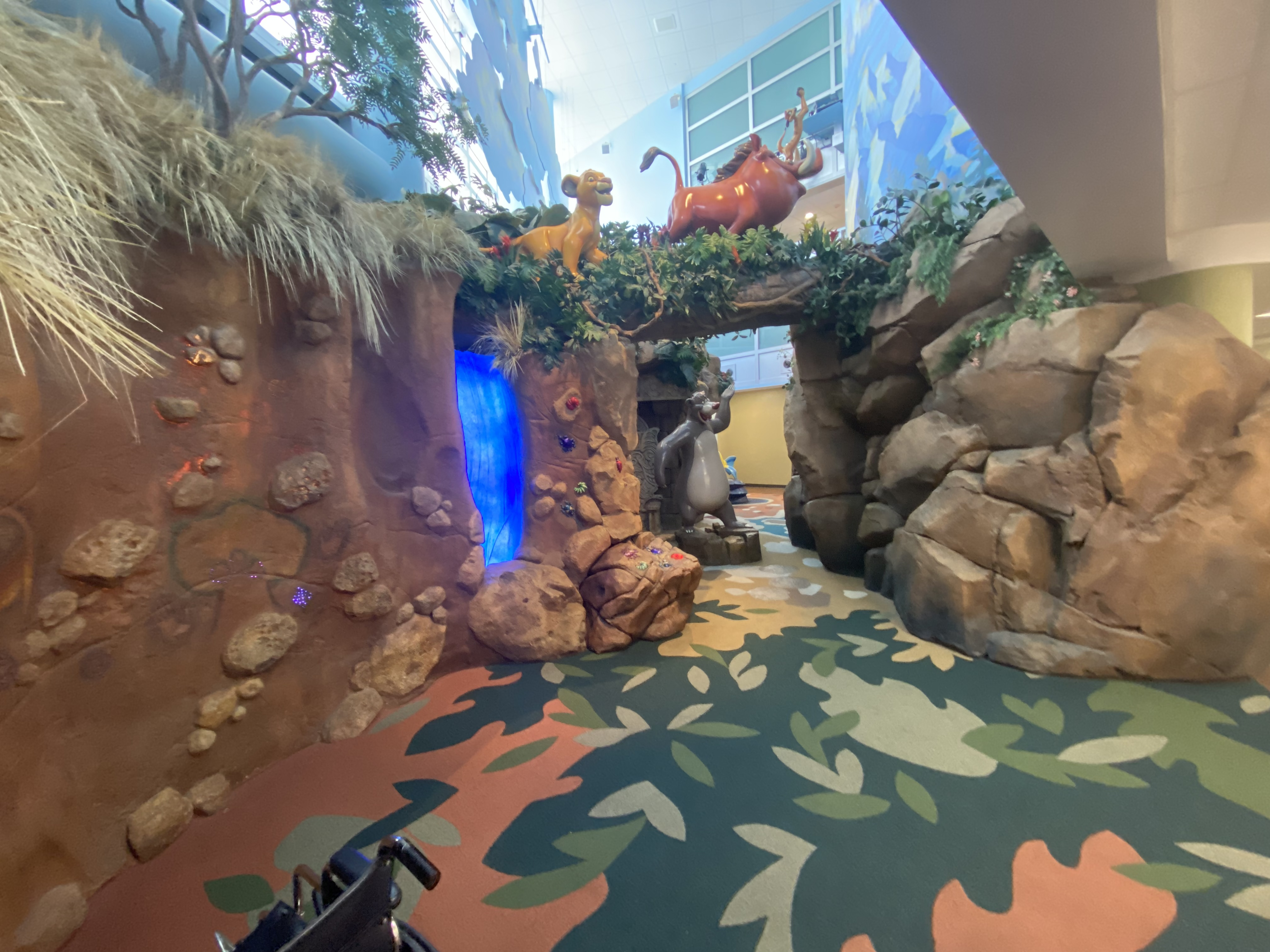
- The Walt Disney Pavilion

Geography
- Location: Orlando, Florida, United States
- Coordinates: 28.5746°N 81.3708°W

Organization
- Care system: Private hospital
- Type: General hospital
- Religious affiliation: Seventh-day Adventist Church

Services
- Emergency department: Yes
- Beds: 206

History
- Former name: Florida Hospital for Children
- Constructed: September 19, 2007
- Opened: March 30, 2011

Links
- Website: www.adventhealth.com/hospital/adventhealth-children
- Lists: Hospitals in Florida

AdventHealth for Children is a non-profit hospital in Orlando, Florida, United States that is located on the AdventHealth Orlando campus.

== History ==
On September 19, 2007, construction work began on new children's hospital to replace the older 155 bed Florida Children's Hospital. The bigger $35 million replacement children's hospital would be seven-stories and have 200 beds. Florida Hospital received $10 million from The Walt Disney Company for the hospital, it will be the first hospital to have the Disney name on it. On March 22, 2017, Florida Hospital for Children had increased its neonatal intensive care unit from 81 to 102 beds. In late June 2010, the hospital had launched its Healthy 100 Kids program to help children to live to be 100 years old. In November, Denny Sanford donated $10 million for Florida Hospital for Children.

On March 30, 2011, Florida Hospital for Children and the Walt Disney Pavilion opened, at the grand opening was Mickey Mouse, Bob Iger, Tom Staggs and Meg Crofton. In late September 2020, AdventHealth for Children began using robots during the Covid-19 pandemic, allowing patients to socialize with people outside of their room.

== Services ==
On October 17, 2023, the Stella Tremonti Down Syndrome Clinic opened at AdventHealth for Children, the facility also goes by the name of SMILE. Stella's parents donated the money for the clinic, her father is the guitarist Mark Tremonti. The clinic is the first in Orlando to treat both children and adults with down syndrome, by offering occupational therapy, physical therapy and speech therapy.

== Visitors ==
On April 12, 2017, Mark Hamill, stormtroopers and R2-D2 visited Florida Hospital for Children on behalf of the Starlight Children's Foundation and Lucasfilm. In late February 2024, Belle visited children at AdventHealth for Children and handed out books and toys from the Starlight Children's Foundation at a party. The children also dressed up in hospital gowns provided by the foundation: Such as Ariel, Mulan, Tiana, Spider-Man and other Marvel Comics characters.

== Charity giving ==
In early August 2025, AdventHealth for Children donated $1 million to Orlando Science Center for its Unlock Science Campaign to advance STEM education for residents in central Florida.

== Partnership ==
In early October 2020, AdventHealth for Children announced a partnership with Rady Children's Institute for Genomic Medicine to diagnose infants and children who are critically ill in the intensive care unit with genome sequencing.

== Awards and recognitions ==
AdventHealth for Children was recognized by The Leapfrog Group as a top children's hospital 2021 and 2022.

== See also ==
- List of Seventh-day Adventist hospitals
- List of children's hospitals in the United States
