= AdventHealth Heart of Florida =

- AdventHealth

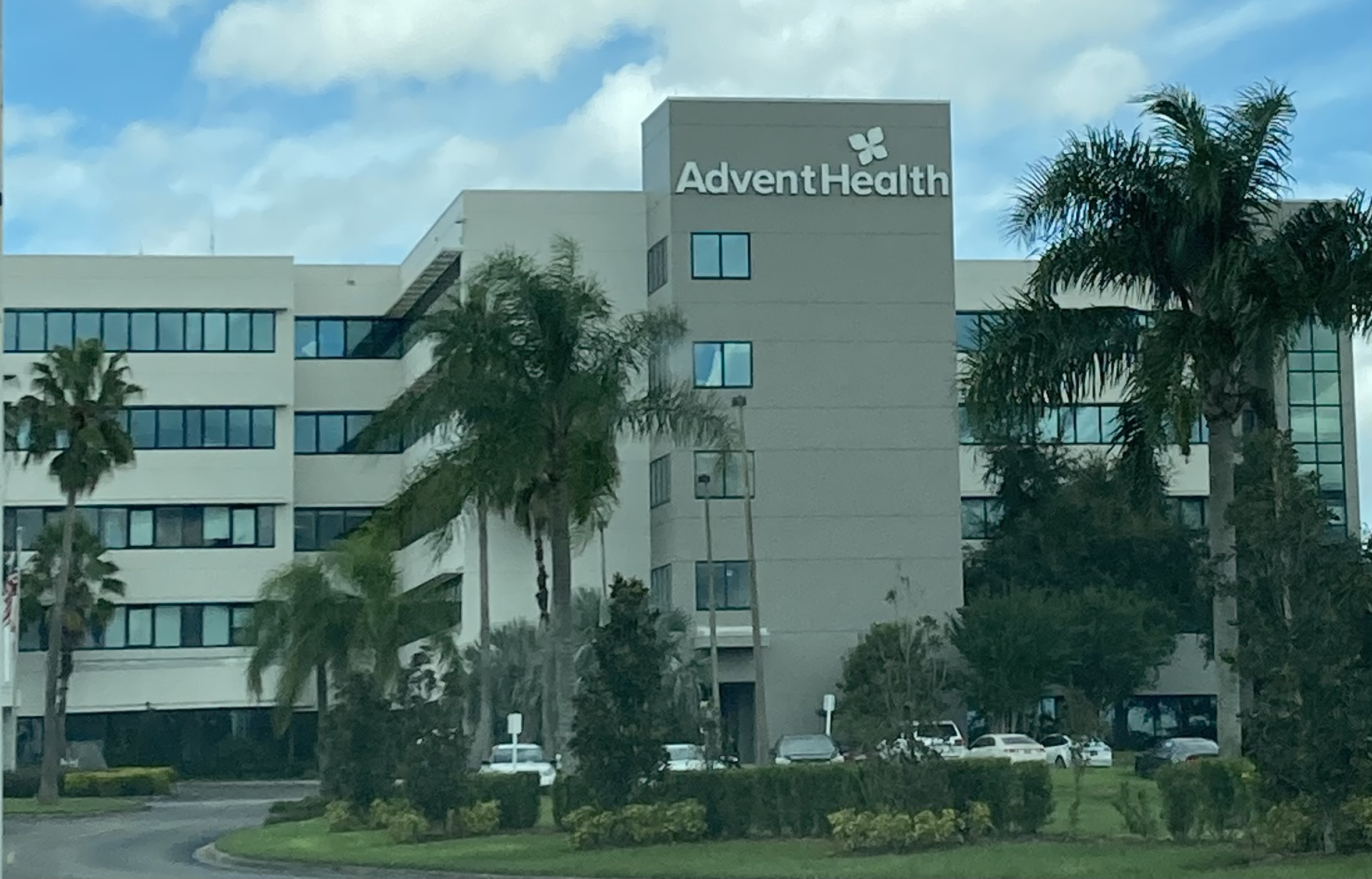

Geography
- Location: 40100 Highway 27, Davenport, Florida, United States
- Coordinates: 28°10′52.25″N 81°38′29.52″W

Organization
- Care system: Private hospital
- Type: General hospital
- Religious affiliation: Seventh-day Adventist Church

Services
- Standards: DNV Healthcare
- Emergency department: Yes
- Beds: 202

Helipads
- Helipad: Aeronautical chart and airport information for 2FL9 at SkyVector

History
- Former name: Heart of Florida Regional Medical Center
- Opened: March 27, 1966 and June 6, 1997

Links
- Website: www.adventhealth.com/hospital/adventhealth-heart-florida
- Lists: Hospitals in Florida

AdventHealth Polk North, Inc. (doing business as AdventHealth Heart of Florida) is a non-profit hospital campus in Davenport, Florida, United States owned by AdventHealth. The medical facility is tertiary and a primary stroke center that has multiple specialties. The hospital was purchased from Community Health Systems in May 2019.

== History ==
=== 1964-1997 ===
In 1964, physician David Green donated real estate to Heart of Florida Hospital Association. On March 27, 1966, Heart of Florida Hospital opened to the public in Haines City. In August 1993, Health Management Associates began to lease the hospital. On June 6, 1997, Heart of Florida Regional Medical Center opened to the public on U.S. Route 27. The three story 120,000 square foot (11,000 m^{2}) hospital was built on 60 acres (24 ha) for $30 million, it had fifty-one licensed beds, twenty-one outpatient beds, an MRI and a cardiac catheterization lab.

=== 2000-2008 ===
In the spring of 2000, an expansion project began with a 7,000 square foot (650 m^{2}) $5 million for a diagnostic radiology suite. In August 2000, Heart of Florida Regional Medical Center had 75 beds. In March 2002, construction workers began to expand the emergency department by 7,000 square feet (650 m^{2}), and renovating it for a total of $3.8 million. In August, construction workers began expanding the second and third floors of Heart of Florida Regional Medical Center for $3.4 million.

In late January 2003, construction was finished on the hospital adding forty-five beds, that increased the total number of beds to 115. Originally the hospital had planned to add only 30 beds. In late October, the cities of Davenport and Haines City wanted to annex the land that Heart of Florida Regional Medical Center was on. In the end the city of Davenport annexed the land. In late November, Heart of Florida Regional Medical Center broke ground on an $11 million, 38,000 square foot (3,500 m^{2}) addition. It added a 15-bed cardiac intensive care unit, it expanded its laboratory, upgraded and enlarged offices, added a cafeteria and a physician's lounge. It also added two operating theaters, expanded its anesthesia care unit from five beds to nine and added a surgery unit for ambulatory care. In 2005, the hospital had 142 beds. On August 2005, Heart of Florida Regional Medical Center announced that it would have a 5,981 square feet (555.7 m^{2}), two-story $4 million addition built, for emergency cardiac procedures. In March 2006, the hospitals cardiac imaging center opened. In late August 2008, Heart of Florida Medical Center opened its fourth floor for $25 million, the joint replacement unit moved to the floor from the third floor. The new floor added fifty-two beds to the hospital.

=== 2012-2016 ===
In 2012, Heart of Florida Regional Medical Center had 194 beds. In early March, construction workers began a 31,000 square foot (2,900 m^{2}) expansion onto the fifth floor at the hospital for $9.5 million. When the construction was finished on the expanded floor, it included two operating theaters, a women's surgical suit with five beds, ten birthing suites, twenty post-partum beds and thirty-five beds for observation. The former women's and obstetrics space was taken over by the Acute Care for the Elderly unit and a fourteen room pediatrics unit. Originally the hospital had planned to only add 47 beds for $9 million. In late June, Heart of Florida Regional Medical Center had a grand opening for its Women's Health Center and opened it to the public later that same week.

On July 30, 2013, Community Health Systems agreed to purchase Health Management Associates for $7.6 billion. On January 24, 2014, the Federal Trade Commission approved the merger of Health Management Associates with Community Health Systems and two days later the merger was completed.

In late May 2016, Heart of Florida Medical Center renovated its radiology department, for a new MRI that it purchased for $2.5 million. In early June, renovations on the hospitals lobby were finished for $400,000.

=== 2019-present ===
On May 22, 2019, AdventHealth signed a definitive agreement to purchase Heart of Florida Regional Medical Center from Community Health Systems. On September 1, AdventHealth took over the management of Heart of Florida Regional Medical Center, it had purchased the hospital for $90 million and renamed it AdventHealth Heart of Florida.

On January 1, 2021, all hospitals were required to have their chargemaster on its website by Centers for Medicare & Medicaid Services. In a survey done in 2022, the majority of hospitals in Florida including AdventHealth Heart of Florida had failed to comply with the Hospital Price transparency Law. It was not until early February 2023, that the hospital was in full compliance with the law.

On November 2, 2022, AdventHealth Heart of Florida began a $7.5 million construction project to expand its emergency department and build a larger chapel. Also to renovate its outpatient and emergency registration areas. Construction was completed in November 2023.

On September 29, 2026, the hospital purchased a 43,100 square foot (4,000 m^{2}) adjacent medical office building from Flagship Healthcare Properties that it had been renting.

== Off campus facilities ==
On February 9, 2005, it opened the two-story medical office building Berry Physician's Plaza in Four Corners. In late July 2009, it opened Urgent Care Cypress in Winter Haven, currently the urgent care center is named AdventHealth Centra Care Winter Haven. On October 18, 2017, the hospital had a groundbreaking ceremony for its freestanding emergency department in Winter Garden. Construction began on the 12,000 square foot (1,100 m^{2}), Four Corners ER in November. In March 2019, the freestanding emergency department opened to patients. In early September, AdventHealth purchased it from Community Health Systems for $9.6 million.

== See also ==
- List of Seventh-day Adventist hospitals
- List of stroke centers in the United States
