= AdventHealth Porter =

- AdventHealth

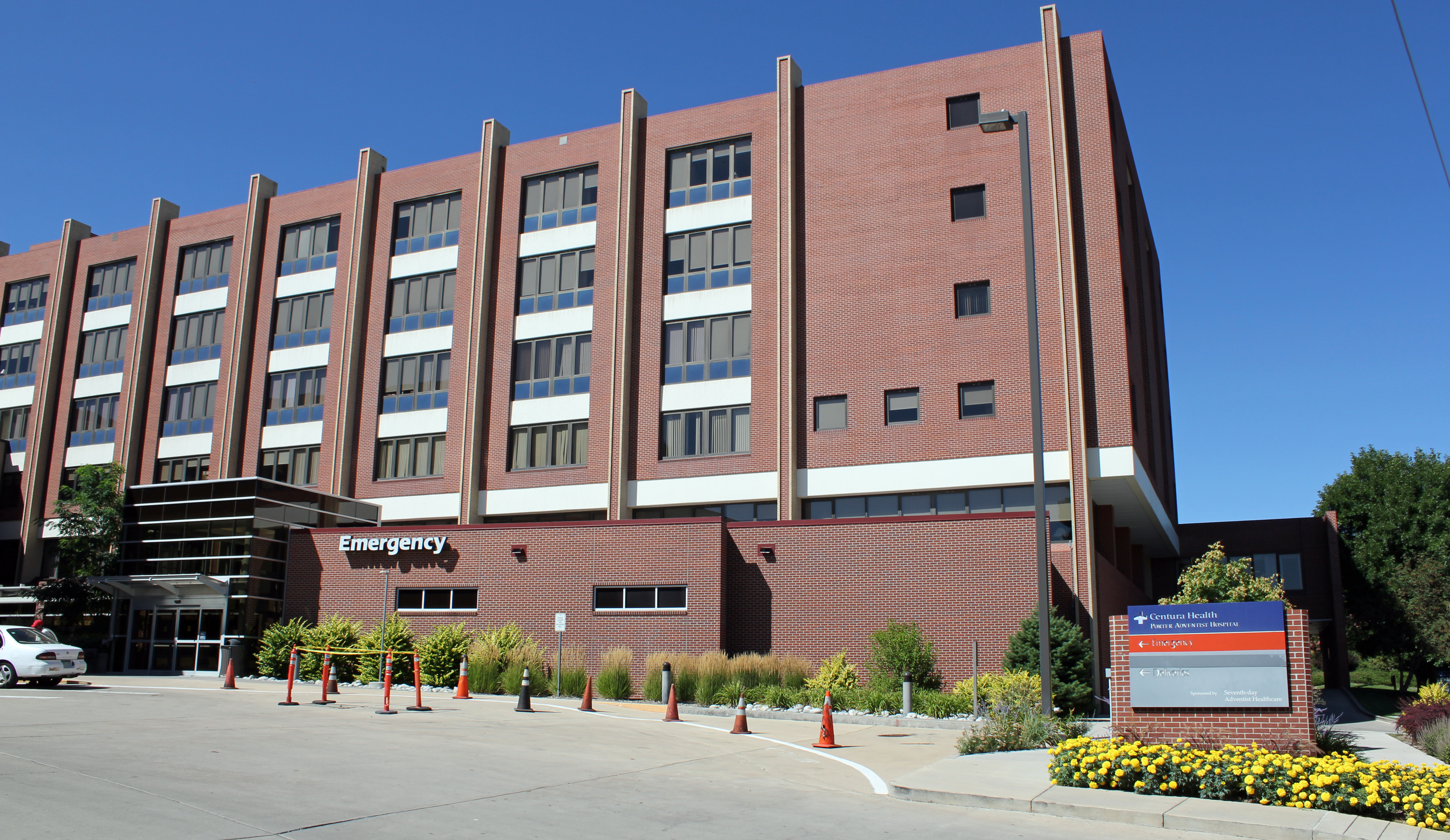
- Porter Adventist Hospital in 2011, before it rebranded in 2023 to AdventHealth Porter

Geography
- Location: 2525 S. Downing Street, Denver, Colorado, United States
- Coordinates: 39°40′13″N 104°58′30″W

Organization
- Care system: Private hospital
- Type: General hospital and Teaching hospital
- Religious affiliation: Seventh-day Adventist Church

Services
- Standards: Joint Commission
- Emergency department: Level III trauma center
- Beds: 368

Helipads
- Helipad: Aeronautical chart and airport information for 69CO at SkyVector

History
- Former names: Porter Sanitarium Hospital; Porter Memorial Hospital; Porter Adventist Hospital
- Opened: February 16, 1930

Links
- Website: www.adventhealth.com/hospital/adventhealth-porter
- Lists: Hospitals in Colorado

Portercare Adventist Health System (doing business as AdventHealth Porter) is a non-profit hospital in Denver owned by AdventHealth. The medical facility is a tertiary, psychiatric hospital, and teaching hospital that has multiple specialties. In 2014, the hospital was designated a Level III trauma center by the Colorado Department of Public Health and Environment. In 2018, the hospital had a sterilization breach and was sued by 3,000 people. It settled the lawsuits for $6.5 million.

== History ==
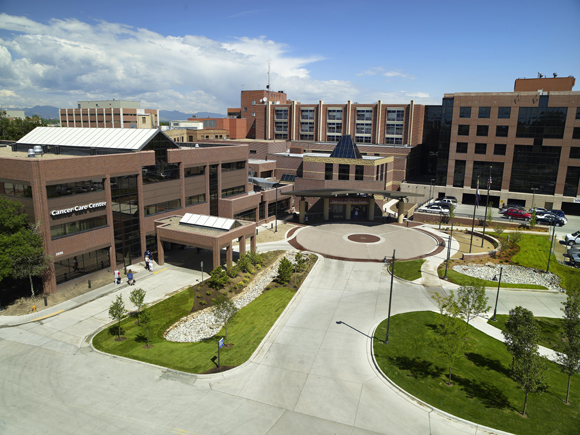
AdventHealth Porter entrance to its cancer care center

On February 16, 1930, Porter Sanitarium Hospital opened with 100 beds. It was named after businessman Henry M. Porter who was inspired to give $1 million and 40 acres (16 ha) to the Seventh-day Adventist Church after being treated at two sanatoriums owned by the Seventh-day Adventist Church.

In 1996, Porter Adventist Hospital became part of the joint venture Centura Health when it was founded by PorterCare Adventist Health System and Catholic Health Initiatives.

In late June 2000, PorterCare Adventist Health System and Adventist Health System/Sunbelt reached a $10 million agreement. It would allow Adventist Health System to acquire the 30 percent of Centura Health owned by PorterCare Adventist Health System. On October 1, 2001, PorterCare Adventist Health System merged with Adventist Health System Sunbelt Healthcare Corporation after approval from the Federal Trade Commission.

In late 2017, the Colorado Senate passed a law requiring hospitals to have their chargemaster on its website by January 1, 2018. The Centers for Medicare & Medicaid Services also required all hospitals to do the same by January 1, 2021. On August 9, 2022, Porter Adventist Hospital still had refused to comply. To force hospitals to comply the Colorado House of Representatives and Colorado Senate both passed laws forbidding hospitals from collecting debt by reporting patients to collection agencies.

On February 14, 2023, Centura Health announced that it would split up. On August 1, Centura Health split up with Porter Adventist Hospital rebranding to AdventHealth Porter. On October 30, AdventHealth Porter closed when it lost heat and hot water at 8:45 a.m. after their second boiler failed during a cold snap. Two weeks before, the hospital had its first boiler fail and they ordered a replacement from a company in Texas. 90 patients were transferred to AdventHealth Castle Rock, AdventHealth Littleton and AdventHealth Parker by South Metro Fire Rescue and local EMS. On October 31, 55 patients were transferred and 30 others were released. Its two boilers were fixed and a temporary one was installed on November 1. On November 9, at 7:00 a.m. AdventHealth Porter reopened resuming its emergency and acute care services.

== Sterilization breach and aftermath ==
On February 21, 2018, the Colorado Department of Public Health and Environment was told of a sterilization breach at Porter Adventist Hospital. The following day they did a survey of the infection control practices at the hospital. The Joint Commission visited the hospital in February after hearing complaints at the hospital. On April 3, the Colorado Department of Public Health and Environment did a second survey after hearing about inadequately cleaned surgical equipment.

On April 4, the Colorado Department of Public Health and Environment announced to the public that at Porter Adventist Hospital they were investigating a sterilization breach. On the same day as the announcement the hospital mailed 5,800 letters to patients who were put at risk from July 21, 2016, to February 20, 2018. Later it was extended to April 5. During that time period patients who had orthopedic surgery were put at risk of Hepatitis B, Hepatitis C and HIV. During its investigation the Colorado Department of Public Health and Environment found out that the hospital knew that patients were getting infections as early as 2017.

On April 5, Porter Adventist Hospital canceled almost all of its surgeries. On April 6, the hospital offered patients testing for blood diseases. On the same day Porter Adventist Hospital suspended all surgeries until the Colorado Department of Public Health and Environment considered it safe to reopen all operating theaters. On April 11, the Colorado Department of Public Health and Environment found some patients had surgical site infections. The next day Porter Adventist Hospital resumed some of its surgeries.

On June 15, Porter Adventist Hospital was sued by 67 former patients and 20 spouses. Those suing the hospital later increased to over 200 and then to over 3,000. They claim that the contaminated surgical instruments were also used for other surgeries, with hundreds of them getting sick from hepatitis B, meningitis, urinary tract infections, E. coli and staph infections. One patient died from sepsis and pneumonia after having surgery at the hospital.

Before the plaintiffs sued they used the Colorado Open Records Act to request the release of the documents of the Colorado Department of Public Health and Environments investigation. They were released in August 2018. After the documents were released Porter Adventist Hospital asked a judge to ban the use of some of the documents, even to order them to be destroyed or returned. The Colorado Attorney General also agreed that the documents should have never been released and ordered them destroyed, which the plaintiffs refused to do. In July 2020, Denver District Court Judge Morris B. Hoffman rejected all of the protective orders requested by Porter Adventist Hospital, which it had requested in May of that year. Porter Adventist Hospital appealed the ruling to the Colorado Supreme Court.

On January 13, 2021, the judges heard the appeal and were reluctant to overturn the decision of the district court judge. In the end the judges dismissed the appeal and returned the case back to Denver District Court Judge Morris B. Hoffman. On June 21, 2023, the Denver District Court Judge accepted the $6.5 million class action settlement.

== Services ==
On July 3, 2018, Porter Adventist Hospital announced that it would suspend its kidney, liver and pancreas organ transplantation program to make improvements with the help of the Florida Hospital Transplant Institute. This affected 232 patients who received letters telling them that they would have to go to other Presbyterian/St. Luke's Medical Center and UCHealth hospitals for their procedures. On July 19, 2019, Porter Adventist Hospital announced that it would resume its organ transplantation program.

On October 25, 2023, AdventHealth Porter signed a commercial agreement with Aclarion to bring their Nociscan technology to Denver. The hospital will become the first health facility in the city to use the technology, to treat patients with chronic low back pain. In February 2026, the hospital began offering the Voucher Program from the National Kidney Registry, it allows donors to give a kidney to family members years in advance.

== Awards and recognitions ==
The hospital received a grade A from The Leapfrog Group from June 2012 to April 2018, and again from May 2022 to May 2026. AdventHealth Porter received from the Centers for Medicare & Medicaid Services a five-star rating from 2023 to 2024.

== See also ==
- List of Seventh-day Adventist hospitals
- List of trauma centers in the United States
