= Truveta =

American health data analytics company

Truveta, Inc.
- Type: Private
- Industry: Health technology
- Founded: 2020
- Headquarters: Bellevue, Washington, U.S.A.
- Website: www.truveta.com

Truveta, Inc. is an American health data and analytics company headquartered in Bellevue, Washington and owned and governed by 30 U.S. health systems.

Truveta was established in 2020 by Providence, Advocate Aurora Health, Tenet Healthcare, and Trinity Health. The company was publicly introduced in February 2021 with fourteen founding health system members. As of 2025, Truveta includes 30 U.S. health systems as members. Truveta provides de-identified electronic health record data for more than 120 million U.S. patients.

== History ==
Truveta was formed in September 2020 by a group of U.S. health systems seeking to develop a shared data resource. The company was publicly introduced in February 2021, with initial participating systems including AdventHealth, Advocate Aurora Health, Baptist Health of Northeast Florida, Bon Secours Mercy Health, CommonSpirit Health, Hawaii Pacific Health, Henry Ford Health System, Memorial Hermann Health System, Northwell Health, Novant Health, Providence, Sentara Healthcare, Tenet Healthcare, and Trinity Health.

In 2021, Truveta entered a partnership with Microsoft to support its cloud and artificial intelligence infrastructure. Later that year, the company released its first data platform and shared initial analytic findings.

In 2022, Pfizer became Truveta's first life sciences customer, and Boston Scientific also began using the company's data platform. In 2023, Truveta introduced the Truveta Language Model, a multimodal large-language model designed to structure clinical data from electronic health records. In 2025, the company launched the Truveta Genome Project in collaboration with participating health systems, Regeneron, Illumina, and Microsoft, alongside raising $320 million in Series C funding.

== Research using Truveta data ==
Studies using Truveta data have been published in peer-reviewed journals across infectious diseases, cardiology, pediatrics, gastroenterology, medical informatics, health services research, and population health.

=== Infectious diseases and public health ===
A 2023 study published in Vaccine assessed the risk of COVID-19 breakthrough infection and hospitalization among individuals with comorbidities using data from U.S. health-system records, including those from Truveta-affiliated systems. A 2023 study in Frontiers in Public Health evaluated racial inequalities in COVID-19 treatment and in-hospital length of stay in the United States over time, using data derived from large health-system datasets including those affiliated with Truveta. A 2025 study published in the American Journal of Preventive Medicine analyzed trends in syphilis incidence among U.S. adults from January 2017 to October 2024 using Truveta data. Another 2025 study in Sexually Transmitted Diseases assessed the need for creating ICD-10 codes to improve monitoring of doxycycline postexposure prophylaxis prescriptions in the United States.

=== Cardiology and cardiovascular outcomes ===
Truveta data have been used in several cardiovascular studies. A real-world, big-data analysis in the Journal of the Society for Cardiovascular Angiography & Interventions compared ultrasound-assisted catheter-directed therapy (USCDT) with medical therapy for pulmonary embolism (the REAL-PE study), based on data drawn from Truveta-affiliated health systems. A subsequent 2024 analysis in the same journal reported additional real-world findings on USCDT versus standard medical therapy for pulmonary embolism using U.S. health-system records, including those from Truveta-affiliated systems. A 2024 cohort study in JACC: Heart Failure evaluated decongestion strategies in patients hospitalized for heart failure using a large community-based dataset including records from Truveta-affiliated health systems. In 2025, a real-world analysis in the Journal of Cardiac Failure evaluated survival outcomes associated with cardiac contractility modulation devices, using cardiac resynchronization therapy data to validate methodological approaches with large U.S. health-system records, including those from Truveta-affiliated systems.

=== Pediatrics ===
In pediatrics, a 2023 time-series study published in JAMA Pediatrics examined first-time pediatric speech delay incidence from 2018 to 2022 using data from U.S. health systems, including those affiliated with Truveta. A 2025 study in Pediatrics Open Science examined changes in pediatric obesity treatment practices in the United States following updated guidelines from the American Academy of Pediatrics, using data from large health-system records, including those affiliated with Truveta.

=== Pharmacoepidemiology and therapeutics ===
A 2023 study in JAMA Network Open examined changes in prescribing patterns of oral minoxidil for hair loss after media attention, using prescription data from U.S. health-system records, including those affiliated with Truveta. A 2025 study, also in JAMA Network Open, examined patterns of discontinuation and reinitiation of dual-labeled GLP-1 receptor agonists among U.S. adults with overweight or obesity using Truveta data. In 2024, a study in JAMA Internal Medicine compared the effectiveness of semaglutide versus tirzepatide for weight loss in adults with overweight or obesity, using data from Truveta-affiliated health systems.

=== Gastroenterology and cancer screening ===
A 2024 study published in The American Journal of Gastroenterology examined real-world adherence to repeat stool-based colorectal cancer screening among individuals at average risk, using fecal immunochemical tests (FIT) and multi-target stool DNA tests (mt-sDNA). The authors analyzed patterns of repeat testing and evaluated factors associated with adherence over time.

=== Nephrology and procedural outcomes ===
A 2025 retrospective evaluation in The International Journal of Artificial Organs analyzed design features, associated risks, and usage trends of non-tunneled hemodialysis catheters, comparing dual- and triple-lumen devices based on real-world data. Another 2025 study, published in Journal of Endourology / Urology & Nephrology Clinics, compared postoperative infection rates for patients using a single-use ureteroscope with real-time intrarenal pressure monitoring versus other single-use ureteroscopes in clinical practice, using large health-system datasets.

=== Medical informatics, AI, and multimodal modeling ===
Several studies have focused on data standards and artificial intelligence using Truveta data. A 2023 preprint titled Truveta Mapper: A Zero-shot Ontology Alignment Framework presented a methodology for aligning biomedical ontologies using zero-shot learning, as a tool that could support data interoperability for health systems. A 2025 study published in Studies in Health Technology and Informatics explored structured large language model (LLM) augmentation for clinical information extraction, assessing its performance and potential for healthcare data analysis. In 2025, a study in Radiology Advances developed "XComposition", a multimodal deep-learning model that uses chest radiographs and clinical data to estimate body composition, as an application of large health-system data for medical imaging research.
