= AdventHealth Central Texas =

- AdventHealth

Geography
- Location: 2201 South Clear Creek Road, Killeen, Texas, United States
- Coordinates: 31°6′49″N 97°48′5″W

Organization
- Care system: Private hospital
- Type: General hospital
- Religious affiliation: Seventh-day Adventist Church

Services
- Standards: Joint Commission
- Emergency department: Level IV trauma center
- Beds: 255

Helipads
- Helipad: Aeronautical chart and airport information for 92TS at SkyVector

History
- Former name: Metroplex Adventist Hospital

Links
- Website: www.adventhealth.com/hospital/adventhealth-central-texas
- Lists: Hospitals in Texas

Metroplex Adventist Hospital, Inc. (doing business as AdventHealth Central Texas) is a non-profit hospital in Killeen, Texas, United States owned by AdventHealth. The hospital is a primary stroke center and it is also designated a Level IV trauma center by Texas Health and Human Services.

== History ==
On September 29, 2016, Metroplex Adventist Hospital opened The Heart and Vascular Center for $4.5 million. On September 22, 2018, the hospital had a power outage that forced the medical facility to evacuate 41 patients by ambulance to Baylor Scott & White Medical Center - Temple and Rollins Brook Community Hospital in Lampasas. The next day power was restored when new generators were installed.

On January 2, 2019, Metroplex Adventist Hospital rebranded to AdventHealth Central Texas. On September 12, 2022, the hospital and Central Texas College, partnered for the Comprehensive Lifestyle Intervention Program (CLIP). On September 16, 2023, AdventHealth Central Texas revealed a statue of an angel to was donated.

== Off campus facilities ==
In September 2019, AdventHealth Central Texas began to operate clinics in Copperas Cove and Lampasas after they were purchased. In October 2023, the hospital opened a clinic in Harker Heights.

== See also ==
- List of Seventh-day Adventist hospitals
- List of stroke centers in the United States
- List of trauma centers in the United States
