= Presence Health =

Presence Health was a health care system formed by the merger of two Chicago-area Catholic health care systems, Resurrection Health Care and Provena Health. At the time, Presence Health was the second-largest health care system in the Chicago metropolitan area. Presence Health was acquired by Ascension in 2018 and was integrated into AMITA Health. AMITA Health split up in 2022, and former Presence Health locations took on the Ascension name.

== History ==
Presence Health was formed in 2011 by the merger of two Chicago-area Catholic health care systems, Resurrection Health Care and Provena Health. Sandra Bruce was named CEO of the company. She had been chief executive of Resurrection Health since 2008. Bruce retired from the company in July 2015. In October 2015, Michael Englehart became CEO and president of Presence.

In 2018, Presence Health was acquired by Ascension and integrated into AMITA Health. After the merger was announced, Presence's CEO Michael Englehart stepped down.
