= College of Healthcare Information Management Executives =

US professional organization

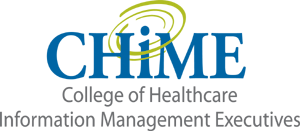
- Formation: 1992
- Type: Healthcare Association
- Purpose: Shaping the future of healthcare through IT leadership
- Headquarters: Ann Arbor, Michigan
- Members: more than 1,800
- President and CEO: Russel Branzell
- Website: chimecentral.org

The College of Healthcare Information Management Executives (CHIME) is a professional organization for chief information officers and other senior healthcare IT leaders. CHIME allows for healthcare and medical executives to collaborate, develop professionally, and advocate the effective use of information management to improve the health and healthcare internationally.

CHIME is directed by an elected 16-member board composed of leading chief information officers (CIOs) and CHIME Foundation representatives.

== History ==
CHIME was founded in 1992 with the dual objective of serving the professional development needs of healthcare CIOs and advocating the more effective use of information management within healthcare.

== Membership ==
Currently, CHIME has more than 5,000 members. Its membership is exclusive, and is typically open to senior IT executives, division leaders, and CIOs within a healthcare organization or facility, and is open to all nations.

CHIME is composed of members of a variety of medical and healthcare systems, including hospital systems, organizations who oversee direct patient care, government agencies, and RHIOs.

== Certification and education ==
In July 2009, CHIME launched the Certified Healthcare CIO (CHCIO) Program, the first certification program designed specifically for CIOs and IT executives in the healthcare industry.

CHCIO is heavily member-influenced. Members are in charge of creating and maintaining the development of the initiative, which serves to aid healthcare IT executives transition to and through CIO 2.0 to CIO 3.0.

To become certified, candidates must hold a baccalaureate degree, pass the CHCIO Examination, have three years of experience as a CIO or equivalent, and earn a minimum number of continuing education units (CEUs) to maintain certification. As of March 13, 2023, there are about 720 CHCIOs and about 30 CHCIO-Eligible Professionals.

== Advocacy leadership and State Net ==
CHIME plays a role in informing and influencing public policy in legislation within the United States, and aids in supplying information about the role of information technology in the delivery of healthcare. CHIME delivers information regarding new healthcare IT legislation, regulations, and policies to its members.

CHIME played a role in creating the HITECH legislation, which included funding for the implementation and meaningful use of electronic health records. Ten members reviewed proposed federal regulations and rules, and provided comments on regulations impacting the use of IT in healthcare.

CHIME operates a non-profit organization, the "CHIME Foundation", for nonmembers to partner and collaborate with CHIME member CIOs.

== Publications ==
CHIME regularly releases opinions, guidance and information on matters of importance to the healthcare IT community. In August 2010, CHIME issued the CIO's Guide to Implementing EHRs in the HITECH Era, which included best practices and steps health care organizations should take to successfully implement EHRs, from the initial planning stages through the final documentation of results. Nearly 170 of hospital CIOs were involved in compiling the information included in the guidebook. The complete guide in PDF format is available at the CHIME Web site.
