= Amyl =

Amyl may refer to:

- Amylum or starch, a carbohydrate
  - Amylopectin, a polymer of glucose found in plants; one of two components of starch
  - Amylose, a helical polymer made of α-D-glucose units; one of two components of starch
- Pentyl, a five-carbon alkyl functional group, also known by the common non-systematic name amyl
- Amyl nitrite, used to treat heart diseases and cyanide poisoning (known as Amyl when used as a recreational drug)
- Dinitrogen tetroxide, an oxidizer used in rocket fuel
- Amyl (drag queen), an Australian drag queen
- Stage name of Amy Taylor, Australian singer of the band Amyl and the Sniffers

== See also ==
- Amylamine, a solvent and raw material
- Amylase, an enzyme that catalyses the hydrolysis of starch into sugars
- Amyloid, fibrous protein aggregates, originally named in the mistaken belief that they contained starch
- Amyloplast, non-pigmented organelles found in some plant cells
- Amyl acetate, used as a flavoring agent, solvent, and in the preparation of penicillin
- Amyl alcohol, a solvent
- Amyl nitrate, organic reagent and diesel fuel additive
- Amylmetacresol, an antiseptic for mouth and throat infections
