= Amyloid (journal) =

- Language: English
- Edited by: Per Westermark

Publication details
- History: 1994–present
- Publisher: Informa Healthcare (United States)
- Frequency: quarterly
- Impact factor: 4.048 (2017)

Standard abbreviations
- ISO 4: Amyloid

Indexing
- ISSN: 1350-6129 (print); 1744-2818 (web)

Links
- Journal homepage

Amyloid: the Journal of Protein Folding Disorders is a peer-reviewed scientific journal that publishes original research and review articles on all aspects of the protein groups and associated disorders that are classified as amyloidoses as well as other disorders associated with abnormal protein folding. The Journal has a major focus on etiology, pathogenesis, histopathology, chemical structure and the nature of fibrillogenesis and also publishes papers on the genetic aspects (both basic and clinical) of many of these disorders. It is the official journal of the International Society of Amyloidosis. The Journal was established in 1994 as AMYLOID: The International Journal of Experimental & Clinical Investigation until the change of name in 2004. The impact factor in 2017 was 4.048. Dr. Alan Cohen was the founding editor and from 1994 until 2010 the first editor-in-chief of Amyloid: The Journal of Protein Folding Disorders. The present editor in chief is Per Westermark (Uppsala University, Sweden).
