= Journal of Cardiac Failure =

- Discipline: Cardiology
- Language: English
- Edited by: Anuradha Lala, Robert Mentz

Publication details
- History: 1994–present
- Publisher: Elsevier on behalf of the Heart Failure Society of America
- Frequency: Monthly
- Impact factor: 8.2 (2024)

Standard abbreviations
- ISO 4: J. Card. Fail.

Indexing
- ISSN: 1071-9164 (print); 1532-8414 (web)

Links
- Journal homepage; Online archive

The Journal of Cardiac Failure is a peer-reviewed medical journal published by Elsevier on behalf of the Heart Failure Society of America. It covers all aspects of cardiology. The editors-in-chief are Anuradha Lala and Robert Mentz. According to the Journal Citation Reports, the journal has a 2024 impact factor of 8.2.
