= AMITA Health =

Chicago interfaith healthcare system (2015–2022)

- Type: Joint venture
- Industry: Healthcare
- Founded: 2015; 11 years ago
- Defunct: April 1, 2022
- Headquarters: Lisle, Illinois, United States
- Area served: Chicago metropolitan area
- Key people: Keith A. Parrott (president and CEO); Thor Thordarson (chief operating officer)
- Owners: AdventHealth; Ascension
- Number of employees: 17,260 (2018)
- Website: www.amitahealth.org

AMITA Health was an interfaith health system formed as a joint venture between Alexian Brothers Health System and Presence Health (both part of Ascension) and Adventist Midwest Health (part of Adventist Health System). As of 2021, AMITA operated 19 hospitals and numerous medical offices, among other facilities. In 2022, the joint venture was dissolved.

== History ==
In February 2015, AMITA Health was created as a joint venture between Alex Brothers Health System (part of Ascension) and Adventist Midwest Health (part of Adventist Health System). In 2018, Ascension acquired Presence Health and merged it into AMITA Health. Company representatives stated that the name AMITA was chosen for its significant in several languages: in Hebrew, it means honesty and truth; in Hindi, it means spiritual light and boundlessness; and it Italian, it means friendship. In September 2019, several executives left Amita Health, including original CEO Mark Frey. In December 2019, the company appointed Keith A. Parrot president and CEO.

On October 21, 2021, AMITA Health announced that the joint venture would be dissolved, with each member hospital remaining in one of those two original groups. The split became effective on April 1, 2022. The Adventist locations rebranded to the AdventHealth name, while Ascension Illinois unified the former Presence Health and Alexian Brothers facilities under the Ascension name.

=== Religious heritage ===
The founders of the AMITA Health facilities were:

- Congregation of Alexian Brothers
- Franciscan Sisters of the Sacred Heart
- Servants of the Holy Heart of Jesus
- Seventh-day Adventist Church Illinois Conference
- Sisters of Mercy of the Americas
- Sisters of the Holy Family of Nazareth, Holy Family Province
- Sisters of the Resurrection, Immaculate Conception Province

All of the founders and of the acquired medical groups and centers, except for those of the Seventh-day Adventist Church, were affiliated with the Catholic Church.
