= Rush University Medical Center =

Teaching hospital in Chicago, Illinois

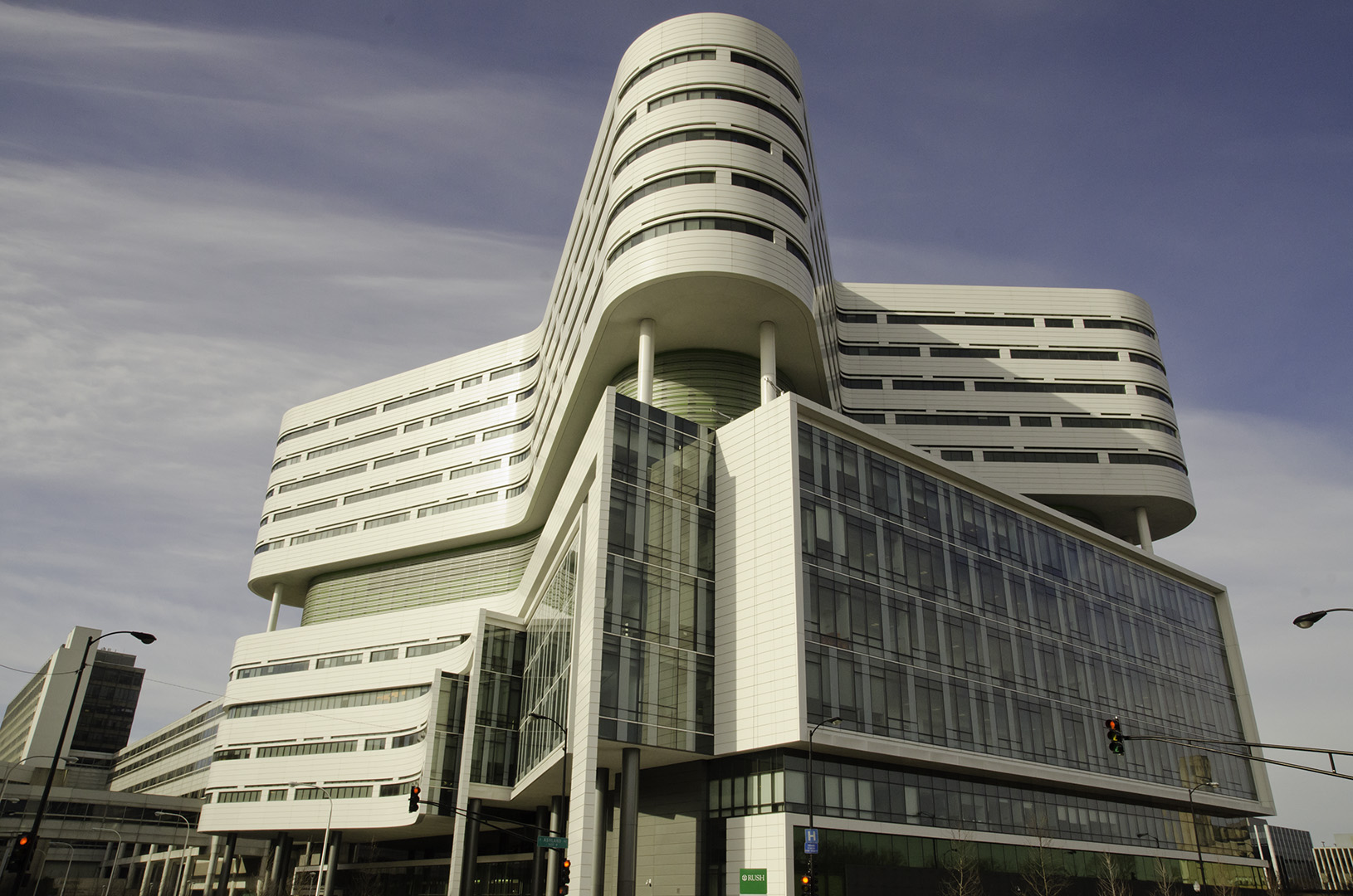
- East Tower of Rush University Medical Center in 2012

Geography
- Location: Chicago, Illinois, United States
- Coordinates: 41°52′29″N 87°40′09″W

Organization
- Type: Teaching/University
- Affiliated university: Rush University

Services
- Standards: tertiary care
- Emergency department: Yes
- Beds: 664

History
- Founded: March 2, 1837; 189 years ago

Links
- Website: www.rush.edu
- Lists: Hospitals in Illinois

Rush University Medical Center, abbreviated as Rush, is an academic medical center in the Illinois Medical District neighborhood of Chicago, Illinois, United States.

It is the hospital for the Rush University System for Health, which includes Rush Oak Park Hospital and Rush Copley Medical Center, and serves as the primary teaching hospital in affiliation with Rush University.

== History ==
Rush Medical College was chartered on March 2, 1837, two days before the city of Chicago was chartered. The college opened with 22 students on December 4, 1843. It was Chicago's first health care institution and one of the few medical schools west of the Alleghenies. Its founder, Daniel Brainard, named the school in honor of Benjamin Rush, the only physician with medical school training to sign the Declaration of Independence, who later taught Meriwether Lewis basic medical skills for his expedition with William Clark to the Pacific Northwest. The general hospital associated with the medical college was the first in Chicago.

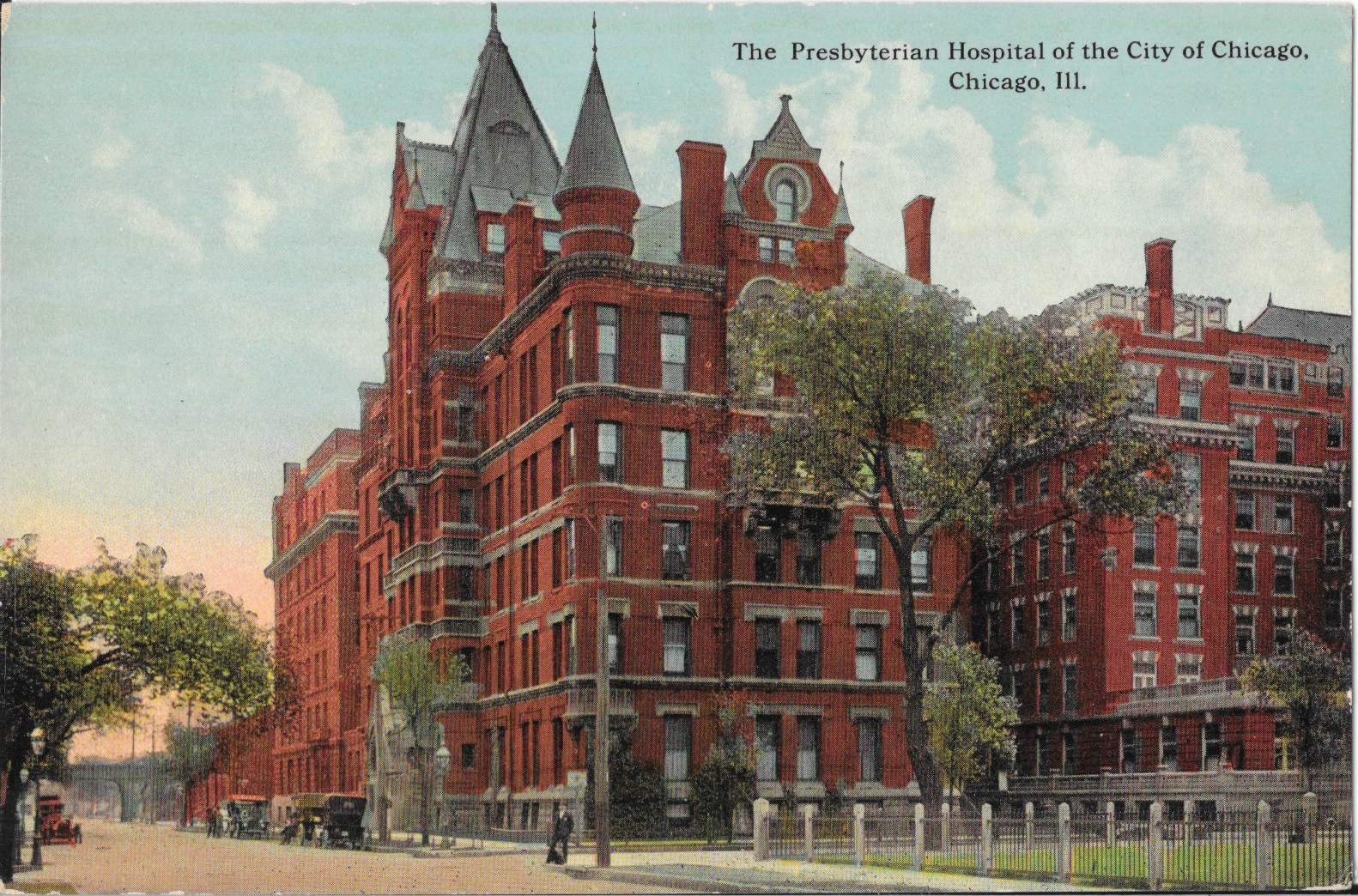
The hospital circa 1900

The early Rush faculty, well known across the American frontier for its expertise, engaged in patient care, research and teaching, and was associated with a number of scientific developments and new clinical procedures. As the city grew, so did Rush's involvement with other developing institutions: St. Luke's Hospital, established in 1864; Presbyterian Hospital, begun at the urging of the Rush faculty in 1883; and the University of Chicago, with which Rush Medical College was affiliated and later united from 1898 to 1942.

In the early 1940s, Rush discontinued undergraduate education, but its library was maintained and its faculty continued to teach at the University of Illinois School of Medicine. In 1969, Rush Medical College reactivated its charter and merged with Presbyterian-St. Luke's Hospital, which itself had been formed through merger in 1956, to form Rush-Presbyterian-St. Luke's Medical Center. Rush University, which now includes colleges of medicine, nursing, health sciences and research training, was established in 1972. The Medical Center officially changed its name in September 2003 to Rush University Medical Center, to reflect the important role education and research play in its patient care mission.

In early 2021, management from both Lurie Children's and Rush University Medical Center (RUMC) announced they were forming a pediatric alliance to better deliver pediatric care throughout the region. The alliance officially started on February 1, 2021, and aligns both inpatient and outpatient pediatric services at RUMC under the "Lurie Children's umbrella", known as "Lurie Children's & Rush Advancing Children's Health."

== Services ==
Rush University Medical Center has 664 patient beds at its 14-story, 830,000-square-foot (77,000 m^{2}) location on Chicago's Near West Side. The hospital is known for its butterfly-shaped tower, designed to handle mass casualty events. Rush offers more than 70 residency and fellowship programs in medical and surgical specialties and subspecialties. It is also the largest nongovernmental employer on Chicago's near West Side, with nearly 10,000 employees and annual spending of over $550 million.

=== Road Home Program ===
Rush University Medical Center established the Road Home Program in 2014. The program focuses on mental health treatment for veterans suffering from posttraumatic stress disorder (PTSD), traumatic brain injury (TBI) and related illnesses. In 2015, the Road Home Program was selected as a founding partner of Warrior Care Network, along with UCLA Health Operation Mend, Massachusetts General Hospital Home Base, Emory Healthcare Veterans Program and Wounded Warrior Project.

The Medical Center has a $581.8 million (2020) endowment.

=== Rankings ===
In 2026, U.S. News & World Report ranked Rush University Medical Center among the top 20 in the U.S. and tied for No. 1 in Chicago and Illinois. Rush is nationally ranked in eleven specialties and high performing in 21 procedures/conditions.

2025-2026 U.S. News & World Report Quality Rankings & Ratings for Rush University Hospital
Specialty	Rank (In the U.S.)
Cancer	#29
Cardiology, Heart & Vascular Surgery	#13
Diabetes & Endocrinology	#14
Ear, Nose & Throat	#19
Gastroenterology & GI Surgery	#25
Geriatrics	#10
Neurology & Neurosurgery	#5
Obstetrics & Gynecology	#34
Orthopedics	#11
Pulmonology & Lung Surgery	#16
Urology	#25
