= Home Base Program =

The Home Base Program is a nonprofit organization based in Boston, Massachusetts, with headquarters in Charlestown, Massachusetts. The program was founded in 2009 through a collaboration between Massachusetts General Hospital (MGH) and the Red Sox Foundation, the official team charity of the Boston Red Sox. It has supported over 50,000 members and families and raised over $48 million for programs and services since its founding.

== Service ==
Home Base provides clinical care and other support to veterans and their families. Clinicians help individuals work through treatment plans with goals to improve quality of life, manage the effects of brain injuries, and support their return to everyday activities. Services are offered at no cost. As of November 2025, the program has over 85,000 clinicians.

== History ==
Red Sox management, owners, and players, as well as MGH representatives, visited Walter Reed National Military Medical Center in Bethesda, Maryland, after the Red Sox won the World Series in 2004 and 2007. Many of these people shared time with hospitalized veterans from Afghanistan and Iraq. After the visit, the Red Sox organization wanted to make a commitment to help veterans and their families when returning home. Following guidance from those at MGH, the Department of Defense, Veterans Affairs, and Senator Edward M. Kennedy, the Home Base Program was developed.

Home Base has since grown beyond Boston, offering clinical services in Texas and maintaining a national and international reach.

== Programs ==
Home Base offers a variety of clinical care options for veterans, service members, and their families, including:

- National Intensive Care Program (ICP): A treatment program helping to mitigate brain injuries, mental illnesses, and substance abuse condensed into two weeks. This program is offered to veterans and their families, as well as a special program for families of the fallen.
- Comprehensive Brain Health and Trauma Program: A program designed specifically for special operations service members, involving care coordination, treatment, and evaluations.
- Regional Outpatient Clinical Care: An in-person and telephone-based care system for veterans, service members, and their families in Massachusetts and Florida, with availability in Arizona planned when Home Base Arizona opens.
- Warrior Health & Fitness: A supervised health and fitness program that focuses on the total healing process for veterans and their families.
- Training in Under-Resourced Communities: A program to train clinicians and first responder volunteers, aiming specifically to advance health centers caring for Black and Native American veterans.
- Innovation & Finding New Treatments: A research program through Mass General Brigham, Harvard University, and national partners working to further develop the programs at Home Base.

== Events ==
These healthcare options, which are free to participants, are funded through events put on by Home Base, including:

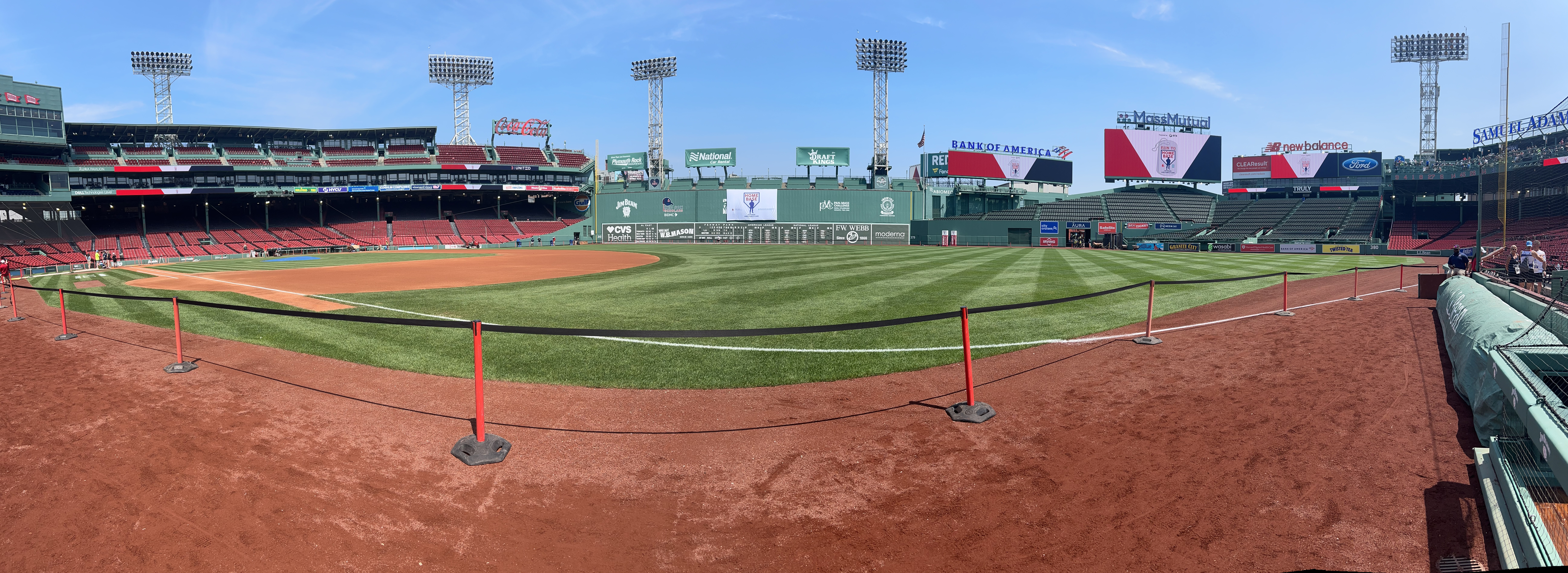
2025 Run to Home Base finish line at Fenway Park.

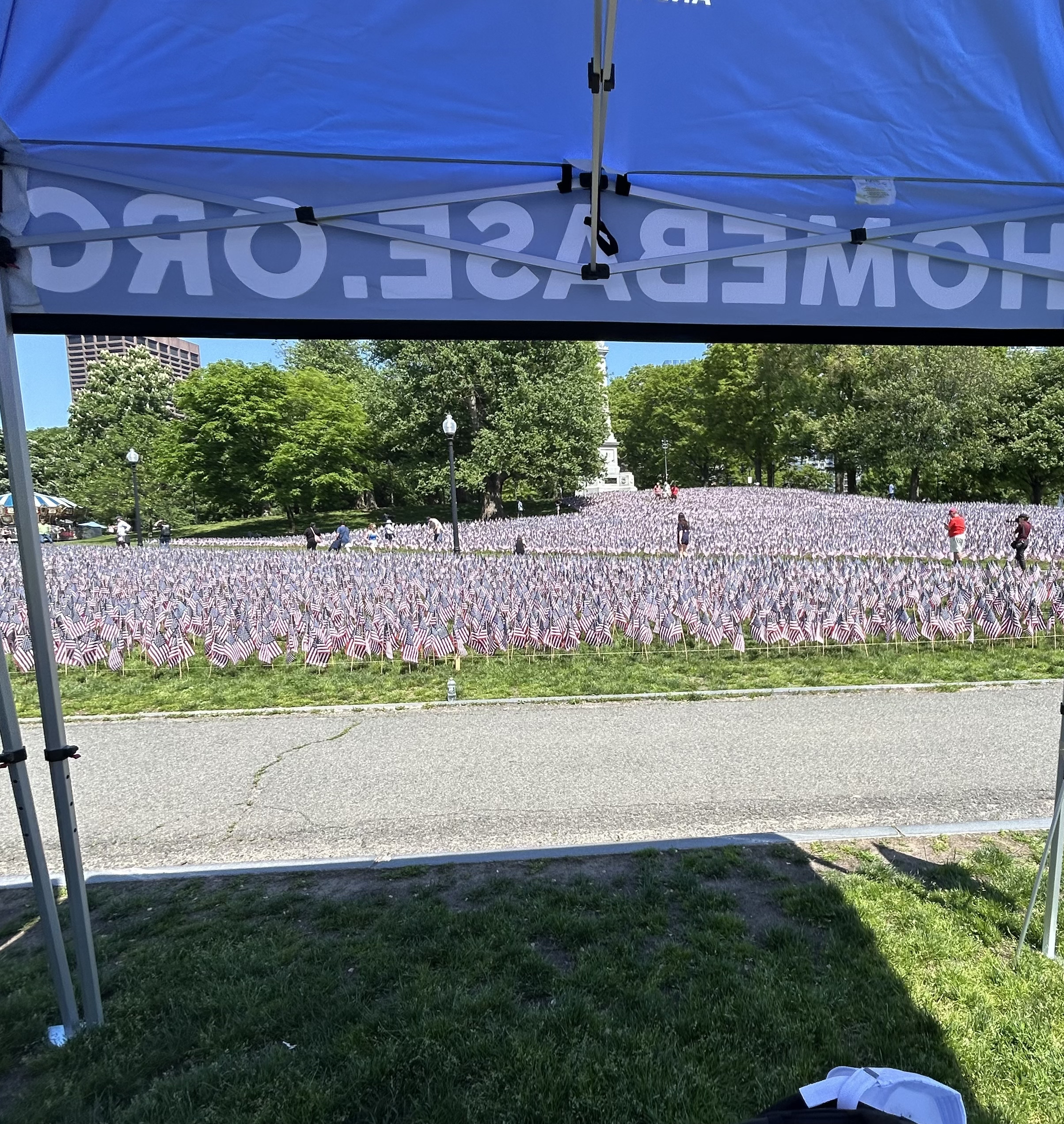
Home Base's 2024 Memorial Day Flag Garden planting in the Boston Common.

- Run to Home Base: A 9K or 5K run/walk fundraiser that allows individuals or groups to donate and raise money to help fund care for veterans, service members, and their families. The run starts outside of Fenway Park in Boston, on Jersey Street, and ends with participants crossing home plate within Fenway Park. A virtual option allows participants to contribute globally. The event had over 3,000 runners and raised over $3.6 million in 2025.
- "Helping Veterans Heal" Telethon: An event that runs from 4:30 a.m. to 8:00 p.m. EST on WCVB, spreading awareness and stories of the care and support provided by Home Base. The event is held once a year, typically around Veterans Day.
- Memorial Day Flag Garden: Volunteers, along with representatives from the Massachusetts Military Heroes Fund and Home Base, plant over 37,000 American flags at the Soldiers and Sailors Monument in the Boston Common to honor service members who have died since the Revolutionary War.

== Partners ==
Since its founding in 2009, Home Base has grown from being supported by Massachusetts General Hospital and the Red Sox Foundation to having a broad network of partner organizations. Major partners include the Benson-Henry Institute for Mind Body Medicine at Massachusetts General Hospital, the Blue Angels Foundation, Fisher House Foundation, Navy SEAL Foundation, SEAL Legacy Foundation, Tragedy Assistance Program for Survivors (TAPS), Welcome Back Veterans, and the Wounded Warrior Project. The program also works with several government agencies, including the Commonwealth of Massachusetts, the George W. Bush Institute's Veteran Wellness Alliance, the Massachusetts Department of Veterans' Services, the State of Florida, the U.S. Department of Veterans Affairs Boston Healthcare System, and the U.S. Department of Veterans Affairs National Center for Post Traumatic Stress Disorder. Home Base is also part of the Warrior Care Network, a program designed to help veterans and service members find mental health support after their service.

== See also ==
- Massachusetts General Hospital
- Warrior Care Network
