= Transition Training Academy =

The Transition Training Academy (TTA) was established as a joint effort of the United States Department of Labor (DoL), Veterans’ Employment and Training Service, Cisco, the Office of Disability Employment Policy (ODEP) and the Wounded Warrior Project (WWP). WWP administers the program as a part of their commitment to the service men and women that have been wounded or injured on active duty.

The purpose of TTA is to help US military returning wounded warriors to develop skills they will need to return to life, to the working world, to the competitive spirit, and to the American workforce in general.

Specifically, TTA helps participants explore Information Technology (IT) as a career field and to develop or recover career skills with real world potential for future employment, self-activation, and socialization.

By the end of 2008, it is expected over two hundred active duty military personnel will have completed the TTA program. Current TTA sites are located in San Diego, CA; San Antonio, TX; Fort Gordon, GA; and the next will open soon in Tacoma, WA.

== What They Do ==
Today's recovering veterans have unique challenges. Due to varying circumstances at different VA facilities, the special rehab needs and abilities of each wounded service person present special challenges. “Traditional” classroom training formats for many are not feasible. The Transition Training Academy was first created to address these issues with state-of-the-art, instructor-led eLearning specifically in the IT field developed through an initial grant from Cisco Systems.
