= Video Display Corporation =

Video Display Corp.
- Company type: Public
- Traded as: Nasdaq: VIDE
- Industry: Electronic Components and Accessories
- Founded: 1975
- Headquarters: Tucker, Georgia, USA
- Key people: Ronald Ordway, Chairman & Chief Executive Officer; David Heiden, President & Chief Operating Officer
- Products: Monitors, displays
- Number of employees: 121

Video Display Corp. is a Tucker, Georgia manufacturer of digital projector display units, and a manufacturer and distributor of cathode-ray tubes used in data display screens.

== History ==
Video Display was founded in 1975 by Ronald Ordway, who has remained chairman and CEO since that time. He is also the company's largest single shareholder.

== Products and Markets ==
Video Display's largest business segment involves designing and manufacturing digital projector display units for defense contractors, including Boeing and Lockheed Martin, for use in flight simulation and training. Video Display also makes the display units for the industrial and medical industry sectors. Its digital projector display unit operations are located at Cape Canaveral, Fla.

Video Display also manufactures and distributes cathode-ray tubes for video display terminals. Its AYON Cyber Security subsidiary, located in Palm Bay, Florida manufactures video displays for the defense industry, security and monitoring industry and other sectors.
