= U.S. Poultry & Egg Association =

- Tax ID no.: 580704657
- Legal status: 501(c)(5) organization
- Headquarters: Tucker, Georgia
- Country: United States
- Website: www.uspoultry.org

The U.S. Poultry & Egg Association is an American industry trade group located in Tucker, Georgia that "represents its poultry and egg members through research, education, communications and technical services." The association was formerly known as the Southeastern Poultry & Egg Association.

Founded in 1947, it is the world's largest and most active poultry organization. Billed as an "All Feather" association, membership includes producers and processors of broilers, turkeys, ducks, eggs, and breeding stock, as well as allied companies. As of September 2025, Jonathan Cade is the Chairman of the Board.

As of November 2025, it has affiliations in 27 states and member companies worldwide. They also sponsor the International Poultry Expo.

The group posts position papers on topics related to poultry and egg production, including controversial and timely topics such as factory farming, genetically modified organisms, induced molting for egg-laying chickens, regulatory efforts, and avian influenza.
