= Emory Saint Joseph's Hospital =

Coordinates: 33.90944°N 84.350805°W

- Emory Healthcare
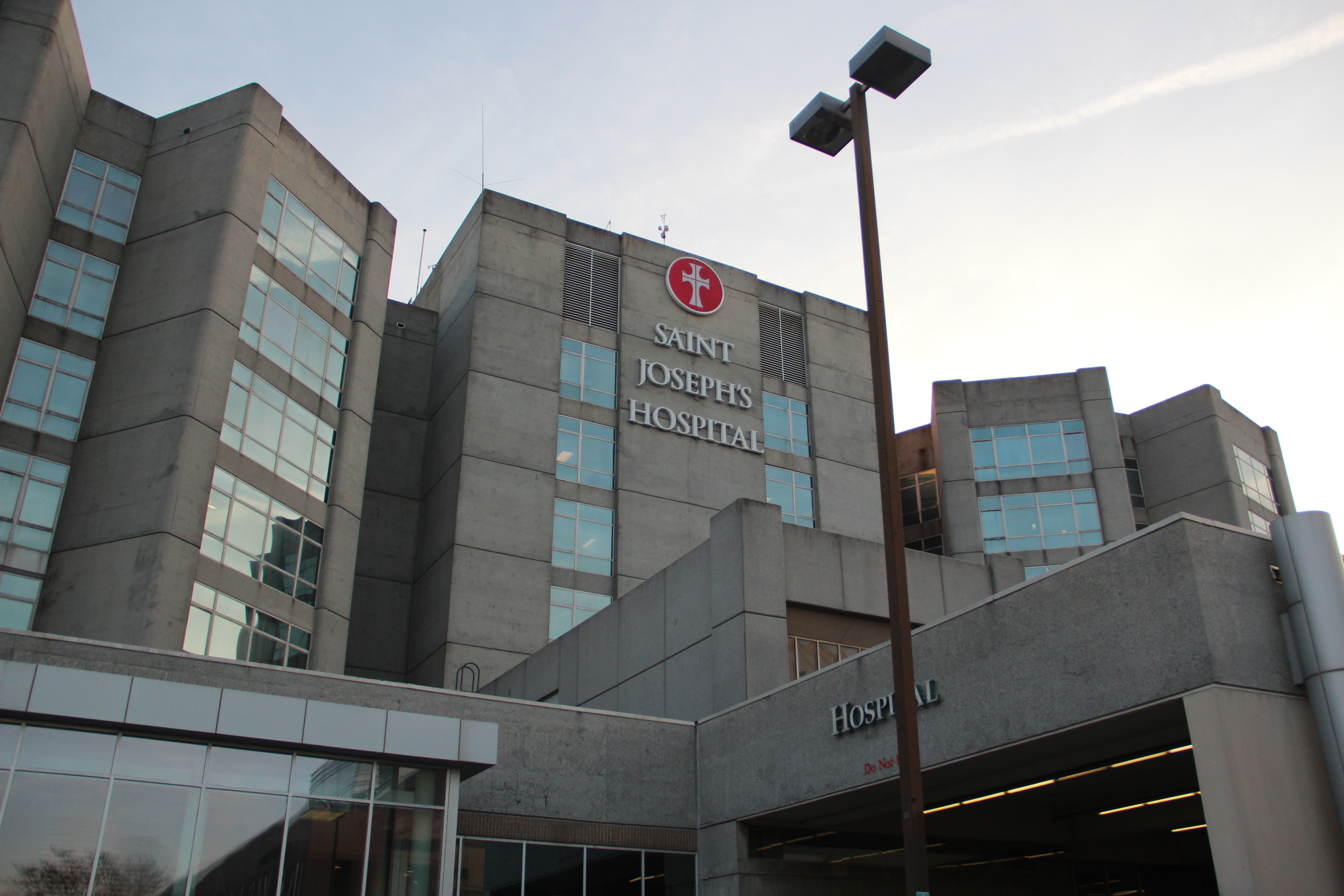
- Emory Saint Joseph's Hospital in 2017

Geography
- Location: Atlanta, Georgia, United States

Services
- Beds: 410

Helipads
- Helipad: FAA LID: GA52
Number	Length		Surface
Number	ft	m	Surface
H1	40	12	Concrete

History
- Former names: Atlanta Hospital; Saint Joseph's Infirmary; Saint Joseph's Hospital
- Opened: 1880

Links
- Lists: Hospitals in Georgia

Emory Saint Joseph's Hospital (sometimes Saint Joe or Saint Joe's) of Atlanta is an acute care hospital located in Sandy Springs, Georgia. It was a sole part of the Catholic Health East until a partnership with Emory Healthcare and Catholic Health East became effective in January 2012. Saint Joseph's (also known as SJHA) was recognized as one of the 50 finest hospitals in the country by HealthGrades for 2007.

Founded by the Sisters of Mercy in 1880, Saint Joseph's facility is Atlanta's oldest hospital.

== Atlanta's first hospital in 1880 ==
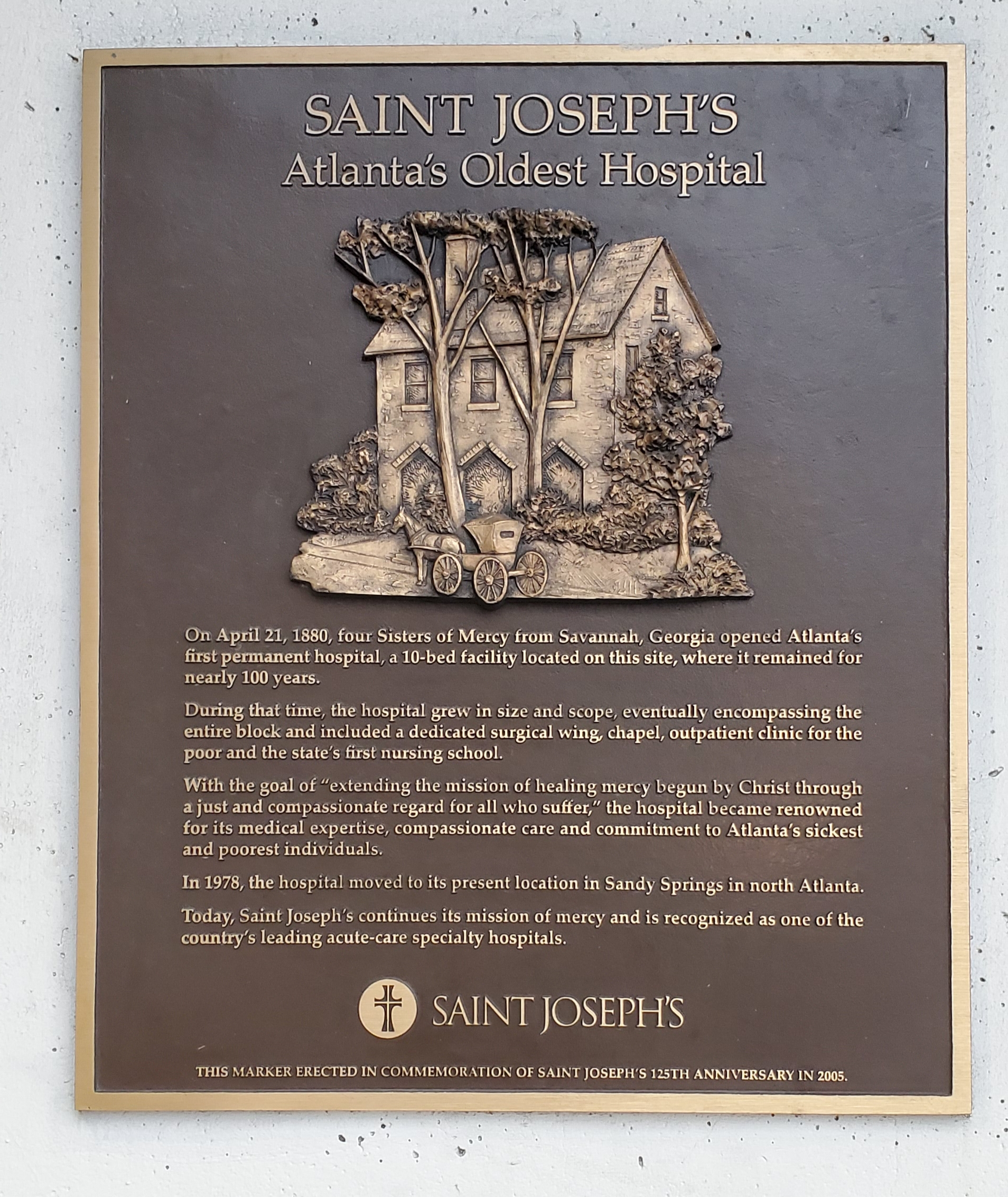
Plaque at the Atlanta Marriott Marquis commemorating Saint Joseph's Hospital

In 1880, a group of Sisters from the Sisters of Mercy order, Sisters Mary Cecilia Carroll, Mary Helena Sheehan, Mary Borgia Thomas, and Mary Bermans Young, embarked on a journey from Savannah, Georgia to Atlanta with a noble purpose in mind. They aimed to establish a hospital in Atlanta, building upon their experience of successfully running a hospital in Savannah. Endowed with the necessary skills, expertise, and compassion, these Sisters were well-equipped to provide care to those in need.

Their vision was supported and encouraged by William Gross, the Catholic bishop of Savannah, who recognized the pressing need for a hospital in Atlanta. At that time, aside from the temporary hospitals established during the Civil War, there was no permanent healthcare facility in the city.

The hospital, initially known as Atlanta Hospital, found its home at the intersection of Courtland and Baker Streets. During its inaugural year, Dr. F. H. O'Brien served as the physician in charge, overseeing the ten-bed facility. The significance of this milestone was highlighted in a May 2, 1880 article published in The Atlanta Constitution, which proclaimed, "Atlanta has a hospital at last. It is a permanent institution which will grow in importance and usefulness as the city's needs increase. The new institution is called the Atlanta Hospital and is controlled by the Sisters of Mercy, whose beautiful ministrations to the afflicted are known to all."

== Atlanta Hospital becomes St. Joseph's Infirmary ==
In 1881, an advertisement placed by the Sisters of Mercy in The Atlanta Constitution heralded a significant change—the renaming of Atlanta Hospital to St. Joseph's Infirmary. The sisters promoted the infirmary's array of modern conveniences, including hot and cold water, and highlighted the multitude of advantages offered for the comfort and treatment of the patients.

In 1900, the pioneering establishment of a nursing school commenced, marking the first of its kind in Georgia. The inaugural graduation ceremony of the St. Joseph's Infirmary School of Nursing took place in 1903 at the nearby Marist College, where five women were awarded their well-deserved diplomas. The nursing school thrived until the 1970s when nursing programs became integrated into universities, such as Georgia State University. The final cohort of students graduated from St. Joseph's School of Nursing in 1973.

Over the years, St. Joseph's Infirmary underwent various changes and improvements. In 1902, a surgical wing was added, made possible by a generous donation from Dr. Robert D. Spalding. Amid the challenges of the Great Depression, Haverty Hall was established to cater to the needs of the less fortunate. The Sisters of Mercy embraced a responsibility that extended beyond caring for the sick, as they actively provided assistance to the impoverished, offering food, clothing, and aid to those in need. They ventured into the streets of Atlanta, extending their help to the needy.

The chapel held a significant place within St. Joseph's Infirmary. Situated at the Courtland Street and Baker Street location, the chapel had Gothic architecture and adorned stained glass.

During World War II, the cost of a one-week stay at the hospital amounted to $46. Recognizing the need for future growth, the hospital strategically acquired additional property on Courtland, Ivy, Baker, and Harris Streets.

In 1953, the hospital underwent a significant expansion with the construction of a new $4 million facility on the newly purchased land. Esteemed long-time supporters of St. Joseph's, including Mr. and Mrs. Hughes Spalding Sr., Mr. Charles Haverty, and Bishop Highland, were present for the inauguration of the new facility. The Haverty family had a connection with the hospital, dating back to the early twentieth century through Mr. J. J. Haverty, the founder of Haverty Furniture Company.

== New name and location: Saint Joseph's Hospital of Atlanta ==
The 1970s marked a period of rapid growth for downtown Atlanta, prompting the decision to relocate St. Joseph's Hospital to a new site. In 1975, ground was broken for the construction of the new hospital on Peachtree Dunwoody Road. The three hundred-bed facility opened in 1978, and the hospital's name changed from St. Joseph's Infirmary to St. Joseph's Hospital.

In 1983, Mercy Care Services was established, with doctors and nurses from St. Joseph's venturing into downtown Atlanta with tackle boxes filled with medical supplies to provide care in places of need, such as soup kitchens and shelters. The following year, the Mercy Care Mobile Unit, a healthcare on wheels program, was introduced.

Another milestone occurred in 1989 with an initiative known as WINGS (Workers Involved in New Growth) took flight. This volunteer fundraising group became an integral part of St. Joseph's Mercy Care, supporting the hospital and raising funds for healthcare endeavors. Since its inception in 1990, WINGS has contributed $7.5 million.

The site has expanded greatly since it was opened in 1978 and now accommodates 410 beds serviced by over 750 physicians. The hospital had 16,358 admissions in the most recent available data. It performed 7,251 annual inpatient and 4,939 outpatient surgeries. There were 33,745 visits to its emergency room. Saint Joseph's Hospital of Atlanta is a non-profit hospital.

In 1956, St. Joseph's Infirmary was the first hospital in the southeastern United States to perform open-heart surgery. The surgery was conducted by Dr. William Hopkins, who utilized a heart-lung machine of his own invention. Dr. Hopkins also made history as the first surgeon in Atlanta to install a pacemaker.

Saint Joseph's Hospital established a comprehensive cardiac catheterization laboratory in 1967.

In 1979, the hospital once again led the way by introducing angioplasty as an alternative to traditional bypass surgery. This groundbreaking technique provided patients with a less invasive option for restoring blood flow to the heart, offering new hope and improved outcomes.

In July 1987, a milestone was reached at the hospital as Dr. Douglas A. Murphy and his transplant team successfully carried out the hospital's first heart transplant. Over the course of the subsequent year, a total of forty-seven heart transplants were performed by Dr. Murphy.

In 1989, Saint Joseph's Hospital once again made medical history in Georgia by utilizing the Jarvik 7 artificial heart technology as a temporary bridge to transplant. Dr. Douglas A. Murphy led the surgical team in this groundbreaking procedure, further solidifying the hospital's reputation as a leader in innovative cardiac interventions.

In 2002, Saint Joseph's Hospital of Atlanta reached another milestone when Dr. Douglas A. Murphy performed the first robotic heart surgery in the state.

Saint Joseph's Hospital was designated as the exclusive cardiac southeastern training center for the daVinci robotic system in 2004. Dr. Douglas A. Murphy, as principal investigator in clinical trials, successfully led one of the first U.S. cardiac surgery teams utilizing the Intuitive da Vinci® Surgical System for atrial septal defect repair and coronary bypasses prior to FDA approval.

In 2012, the name became Emory Saint Joseph's Hospital after its affiliation with Emory Healthcare.

In 2016, Emory Saint Joseph's Hospital surgeon, Dr. Douglas A. Murphy, was recognized for his world record of completing two thousand robotically assisted mitral valve surgery cases.

== Movie location ==
A number of movies have been filmed onsite. These include Ring of Fire, Flight, Anchorman 2, Dumb and Dumber To, as well as the USA network television show Necessary Roughness.
