= Emory University Orthopaedics and Spine Hospital =

Hospital in Georgia, US

Coordinates: 33.8260°N 84.2478°W

The Emory University Orthopaedics and Spine Hospital is part of the Emory Healthcare system. The hospital is situated in a six-story building at the intersection of Interstate 285 and Lawrenceville Highway in Tucker, Georgia, United States, and is staffed by full-time Emory physicians. The hospital, which does not have an emergency department, specializes in inpatient orthopedics and spine operations.
