= Emory Healthcare =

American health care system in Georgia

Coordinates: 33°47′30″N 84°19′11.7″W

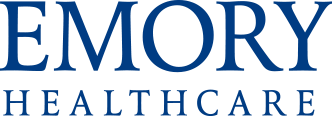
- Formation: 1905; 121 years ago
- Type: non-profit health system
- Location: Atlanta, Georgia, U.S.
- Region served: Metro Atlanta and other parts of Georgia
- Key people: Ravi I. Thadani, MD, MPH (Executive Vice President for Health Affairs)
- Staff: 25,000 (April 2022)
- Website: emoryhealthcare.org

Emory Healthcare is an American health care system in the U.S. state of Georgia. It is part of Emory University and is the largest healthcare system in the state. It comprises 13 hospitals, the Emory Clinic and more than 250 provider locations. Established in 2011, the Emory Healthcare Network is the largest clinically integrated network in Georgia with more than 2,800 physicians concentrating in 70 different subspecialties.

== Hospitals ==
- Emory University Hospital
- Emory University Hospital Midtown
- Emory University Hospital at Wesley Woods
- Emory Johns Creek Hospital
- Emory Saint Joseph's Hospital
- Emory St. Francis Hospital
- Emory Rehabilitation Hospital
- Emory University Orthopaedics and Spine Hospital
- Emory Decatur Hospital
- Emory Hillandale Hospital
- Emory Long Term Acute Care
- Emory Hospital Warner Robins
- Emory Hospital Perry

== Emory Clinic ==
Emory Clinic is the outpatient physician practice of the Emory Healthcare system.

== Affiliations and partnerships ==
Emory Healthcare has relationships with the Atlanta VA Medical Center, Children's Healthcare of Atlanta, Grady Memorial Hospital, and MinuteClinics in the Atlanta area. In 2015, Emory Healthcare's Veterans Program received a $15 million grant from Wounded Warrior Project to expand its outpatient services and become a partner of the Warrior Care Network as a PTSD treatment center.

== Awards and recognition ==
- Emory University Hospital (including Emory University Hospital at Wesley Woods and Emory Orthopaedics & Spine Hospital) has ranked #1 in metro Atlanta and in Georgia by U.S. News & World Report from 2012 through 2020.
- Emory Healthcare is the only academic medical institution to have had two hospitals ranked in the national top 10 for quality by the University Health System Consortium (UHC). In 2013, Emory University Hospital was ranked #2 and Emory University Hospital Midtown was ranked #3. In 2014, these hospitals remained in the top quartile, with Emory University Hospital ranking #2 and Emory University Hospital Midtown ranking #22.
- Winship Cancer Institute of Emory University is Georgia’s only National Cancer Institute-designated cancer center.
- Emory University Hospital and Emory Saint Joseph’s Hospital have both received Magnet recognition by the American Nurses Credentialing Center. Emory University Hospital received Magnet accreditation in 2014; the same year Emory Saint Joseph’s Hospital received its fifth consecutive accreditation, making it one of only three hospitals in the world to be accredited five times.
- Emory University Hospital was the first hospital in the United States to treat patients with known Ebola virus disease. To date, four patients with Ebola virus disease have been successfully treated at this facility. It has been designated by the White House as one of the country’s Ebola treatment centers.
