= Tucker, Georgia =

- City
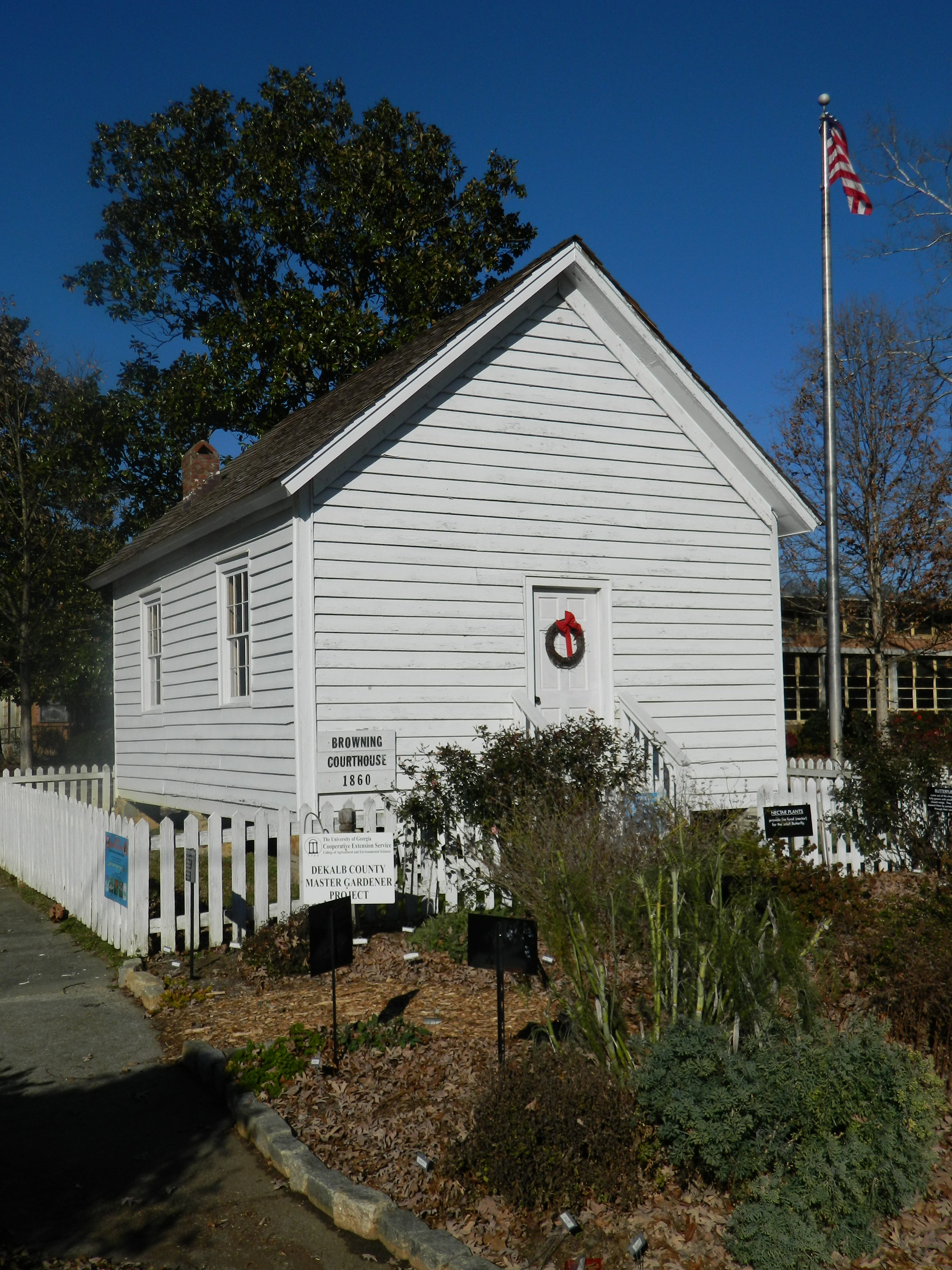
- The historic Brownings Courthouse in December 2012

- Flag Seal
- Coordinates: 33°51′6″N 84°13′17″W
- Country: United States
- State: (Georgia (U.S. state)) Georgia
- County: DeKalb

Government
  - Mayor: Frank Auman (R)

Area
  - Total: 20.34 sq mi (52.67 km^{2})
  - Land: 20.20 sq mi (52.33 km^{2})
  - Water: 0.13 sq mi (0.34 km^{2})
- Elevation: 1,122 ft (342 m)

Population (2020)
  - Total: 37,005
  - Density: 1,831.5/sq mi (707.16/km^{2})
- Time zone: UTC-5 (Eastern (EST))
  - Summer (DST): UTC-4 (EDT)
- ZIP codes: 30084 & 30085
- Area codes: 404, 770, 678
- FIPS code: 13-77652
- GNIS feature ID: 0333270
- Website: tuckerga.gov

Tucker is a city located near Atlanta in DeKalb County, Georgia, United States and was originally settled in the 1820s, and later developed as a railroad community in 1892. As of the 2020 census, Tucker had a population of 37,005. In a November 2015 referendum, by a 3:1 margin (73.94%), voters approved incorporating Tucker into a city. In March 2016, Tucker residents elected the city's first mayor and city council. City status officially started in around late August 2016 While officially in DeKalb, unincorporated areas with a Tucker address overspill into nearby Gwinnett County.

== History ==
=== Settlers ===
The 1821 Georgia Land Lottery opened portions of state land for settlement between the Flint and Ocmulgee rivers, including present-day DeKalb County. The Muscogee (Creek) Nation ceded the land to the United States in January of that year, and drawings for lots measuring 202.5 acres (81.9 ha) each began in May in Milledgeville, the state capital until 1868. The land grant fee was $19.00.

In 1821, the area that would become Tucker was in Militia District 572 in Henry County. The state created DeKalb County on December 9, 1822, and District 572 became DeKalb's 18th District, or the Brownings District, reportedly named for Andrew Browning.

Among the thirty cemeteries within a 4-mile (6 km) radius of Main Street, approximately 30 graves belong to individuals born in the 18th century, four of whom are Revolutionary War soldiers. Twelve graves belong to Confederate soldiers.

=== American Civil War ===
In spite of DeKalb County delegates voting against secession from the United States, Georgia joined the Confederacy and seceded from the Union in 1861. The full reality of that decision marched into Tucker in July 1864. Union soldiers camped at Henderson's Mill, used the Brownings Courthouse, one of the few buildings in the area they did not burn, dismantled the railroad to Stone Mountain, and formed the left wing of Sherman's advance to Atlanta.

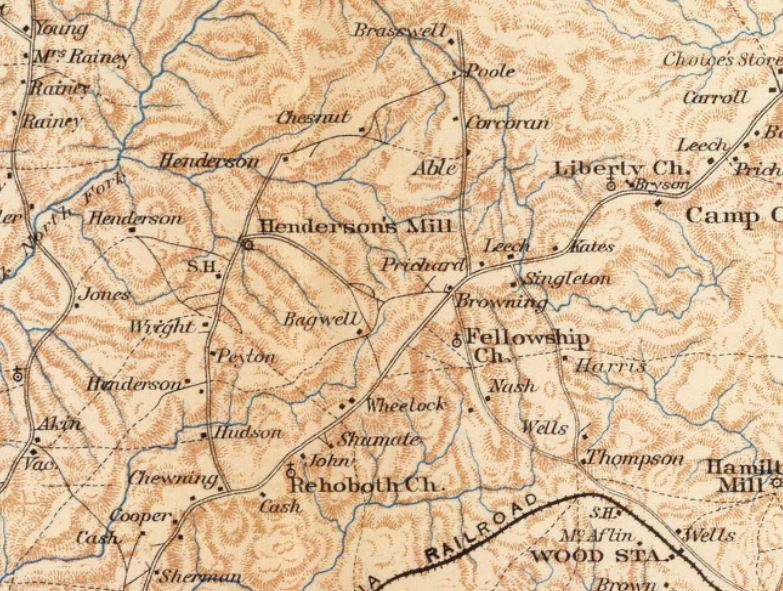
Map of Tucker area during the U.S. Civil War

=== Railroad ===
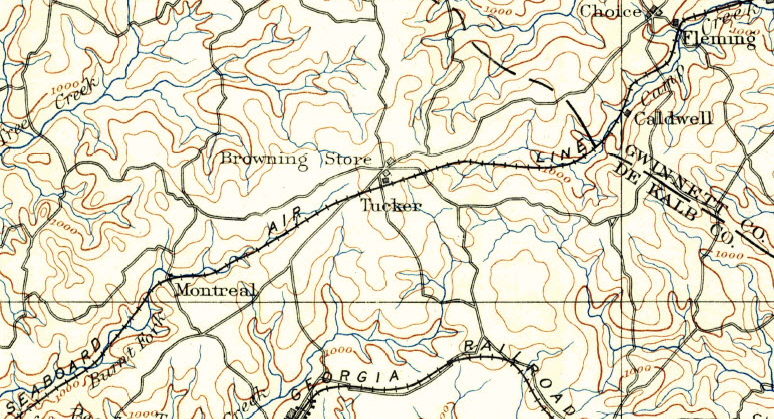
19th century geological survey showing railroad in Tucker

In 1886 the Georgia, Carolina and Northern Railway received a charter to build a new rail line between Monroe, North Carolina, and Atlanta. Prior to the project's completion, the company leased the road to the Seaboard Air Line Railroad system, a collection of regional railroads headquartered in North Carolina eager to extend its reach to Atlanta.

Seaboard built depots at a number of small villages, often little more than a crossroads, and named them for railroad company officials. The depot at Jug Tavern, for example, was named for Seaboard's general manager, John H. Winder. The stop at Bryan was named in honor of the system's general superintendent, Lilburn Meyers. Although the origin of the name is unknown, it is possible that the next stop, in the Brownings District, may have been named for Rufus S. Tucker, a director and major shareholder in several Seaboard system railroads. At the DeKalb County Centennial Celebration in 1922, Charles Murphey Candler stated that Tucker a "prosperous and promising village on the Seaboard Air Line Railway... was named in honor of Capt. Tucker, an official of the Seaboard Air Railway." Some residents attribute the name to a local family with the surname Tucker.

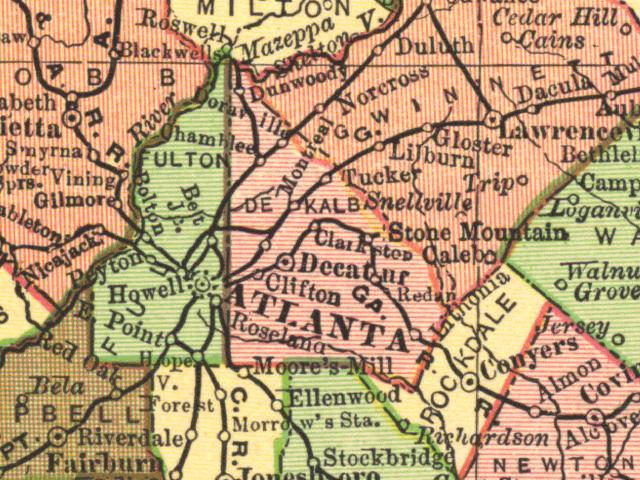
1895 Map of DeKalb County, Georgia, including Tucker.

The first train steamed into the new Tucker station on Sunday, April 24, 1892. Originating in Elberton with a final destination of the Atlanta suburb of Inman Park — a four-hour trip — the Seaboard train consisted of two cars carrying 150 passengers and a baggage car. Two months later the US Postal Service appointed Alpheus G. Chewning first Postmaster of the Tucker Post office. Rural Free Delivery began on March 2, 1903.

On Saturday, July 1, 1967, the Seaboard Air Line Railroad merged with the Atlantic Coast Line to form Seaboard Coast Line Railroad. In 1983 The line became Seaboard System and merged with the Chesapeake & Ohio, Baltimore & Ohio and the Western Maryland in 1986 Chessie System to form current railroad operator, CSXT. Although no longer a train stop for passengers, the Tucker depot is currently a CSX field office for track repair and signal maintenance.

Tucker, at 1,117 feet (340 m) above sea level, is the highest point of elevation on the railroad line between Atlanta and Richmond, Virginia.

=== 20th century ===
Following World War II, Tucker began a steady transition from an agricultural community to a mixed industrial, retail, and residential area. The strength of a county-wide water system extending into Tucker by the 1950s, and the post war establishment of nearby employers in other areas of the county including the Centers for Disease Control and Prevention in 1946 (originally known as the Communicable Disease Center), General Motors in Doraville, Kraft Foods and a large Veterans' Hospital in Decatur, and the growth of Emory University, brought new residents to Tucker from across the nation. Descendants of early settlers subdivided and sold family land for neighborhoods and shopping plazas. Local community leaders opened Tucker Federal Savings and Loan, created a youth football league, and by the 1960s newspapers identified Tucker as "DeKalb's Area of Golden Opportunity". The post–World War II baby boom drove the growth of DeKalb County schools and with the affordability of the car, the expansion of the highway system, and inexpensive fuel, Tucker became an ideal location to call home.

== Geography ==
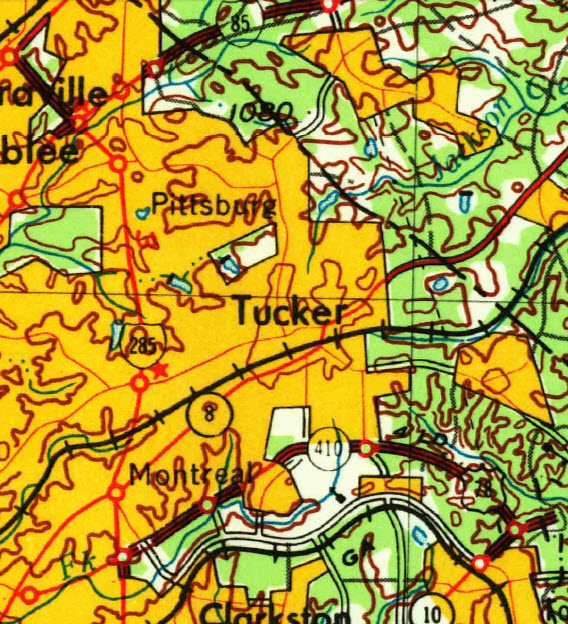
U. S. Geological Survey 1964

Tucker is located in northeastern DeKalb County at 33°51′6″N 84°13′17″W (33.851736, -84.221524), approximately 15 miles (24 km) northeast of downtown Atlanta. According to the United States Census Bureau, the CDP has a total area of 12.1 square miles (31 km^{2}), of which 12.0 square miles (31 km^{2}) is land and 0.1 square miles (0.26 km^{2}), or 0.83%, is water.

The Eastern Continental Divide cuts through Tucker, along Chamblee-Tucker Road to LaVista Road and continuing south towards Mountain Industrial Boulevard. Water falling to the west of this line flows towards the Chattahoochee River and the Gulf of Mexico. Water falling to the east of this line flows towards the Atlantic Ocean through the Ocmulgee River.

=== Topography ===
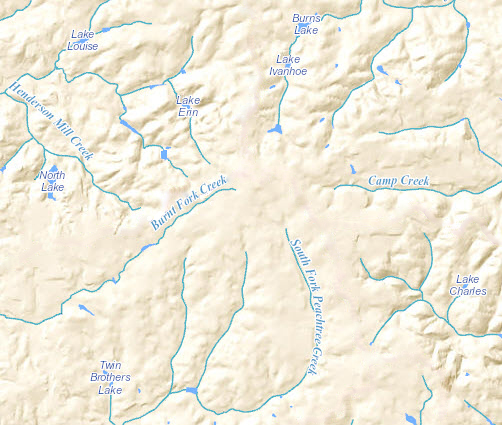
Tucker creeks and streams

Tucker is in the state's Piedmont geologic region, composed of igneous and metamorphic rocks resulting from 300 to 600 million year old sediments that were subjected to high temperatures and pressures and re-exposed roughly 250 to 300 million years ago. Rocks typical of the region include schist, amphibolite, gneiss, migmatite, and granite.

Over a dozen creeks originate in Tucker including Burnt Fork Creek, South Fork Peachtree Creek, Camp Creek, and Henderson Mill Creek. Prior to the widespread accessibility of electricity and indoor plumbing, several were used as mill ponds or dammed for baptism. From 1906 until its demise in the 1940s, Burnt Fort Creek was the primary tributary for the Decatur Waterworks.

== Climate ==
Tucker

Climate chart (precipitation, max. and min. temperature)
J	F	M	A	M	J	J	A	S	O	N	D
4.8 51 33	5 56 36	5 65 42	3.7 74 50	4.1 80 59	4.8 87 67	5 89 70	4.3 88 70	4.6 83 63	3.5 73 51	4.2 63 42	4.2 54 35
- █ Average max. and min. temperatures in °F
- █ Precipitation totals in inches
Metric conversion
J	F	M	A	M	J	J	A	S	O	N	D
122 11 1	127 13 2	126 18 6	93 23 10	103 27 15	121 30 19	128 32 21	109 31 21	116 28 17	88 23 11	107 17 6	106 12 2
- █ Average max. and min. temperatures in °C
- █ Precipitation totals in mm

Tucker's climate, typical of a humid subtropical climate, features mild winters and hot summers. In spite of moderate conditions compared to communities in many other states, Tucker has occasional extreme weather. The record high is 110 °F (43 °C), recorded on July 8, 1927, and the record low, January 21, 1985, −10 °F (−23 °C).

== Demographics ==
Historical population
Census	Pop.	Note	%±
1980	25,399		—
1990	25,781		1.5%
2000	26,532		2.9%
2010	27,581		4.0%
2020	37,005		34.2%
2025 (est.)	37,290	▲	0.8%
U.S. Decennial Census; 1850-1870 1870-1880; 1890-1910 1920-1930; 1940 1950 1960; 1970 1980 1990; 2000 2010 2020; 2025

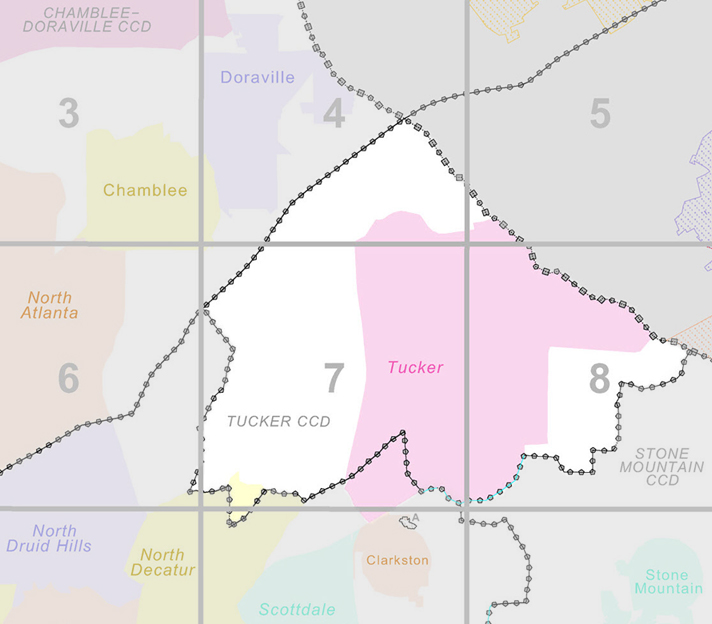
Map of the US Census Bureau's Tucker CCD and Tucker Census-designated place (CDP)

Tucker first appeared as a census designated place in the 1980 U.S. census and after incorporation was listed as a city in the 2020 U.S. census.

=== Racial and ethnic composition ===
Tucker, Georgia – Racial and ethnic composition Note: the U.S. census treats Hispanic/Latino as an ethnic category. This table excludes Latinos from the racial categories and assigns them to a separate category. Hispanics/Latinos may be of any race.
Race / Ethnicity (NH = Non-Hispanic)	Pop 2000	Pop 2010	Pop 2020	% 2000	% 2010	% 2020
White alone (NH)	18,239	15,951	14,387	68.74%	57.83%	38.88%
Black or African American alone (NH)	3,670	6,003	13,209	13.83%	21.76%	35.70%
Native American or Alaska Native alone (NH)	31	57	72	0.12%	0.21%	0.19%
Asian alone (NH)	2,095	2,022	3,054	7.90%	7.33%	8.25%
Native Hawaiian or Pacific Islander alone (NH)	10	19	7	0.04%	0.07%	0.02%
Other race alone (NH)	55	75	230	0.21%	0.27%	0.62%
Mixed race or Multiracial (NH)	385	526	1,423	1.45%	1.91%	3.85%
Hispanic or Latino (any race)	2,047	2,928	4,623	7.72%	10.62%	12.49%
Total	26,532	27,581	37,005	100.00%	100.00%	100.00%

=== 2020 census ===
As of the 2020 census, Tucker had a population of 37,005. The median age was 40.5 years. 20.2% of residents were under the age of 18 and 17.7% of residents were 65 years of age or older. For every 100 females there were 90.8 males, and for every 100 females age 18 and over there were 87.9 males age 18 and over.

100.0% of residents lived in urban areas, while 0.0% lived in rural areas.

There were 15,100 households in Tucker, including 8,753 families; 28.1% had children under the age of 18 living in them. Of all households, 41.3% were married-couple households, 19.2% were households with a male householder and no spouse or partner present, and 33.2% were households with a female householder and no spouse or partner present. About 30.7% of all households were made up of individuals and 10.4% had someone living alone who was 65 years of age or older.

There were 16,255 housing units, of which 7.1% were vacant. The homeowner vacancy rate was 2.3% and the rental vacancy rate was 9.5%.

Racial composition as of the 2020 census
Race	Number	Percent
White	14,888	40.2%
Black or African American	13,398	36.2%
American Indian and Alaska Native	200	0.5%
Asian	3,064	8.3%
Native Hawaiian and Other Pacific Islander	7	0.0%
Some other race	2,743	7.4%
Two or more races	2,705	7.3%
Hispanic or Latino (of any race)	4,623	12.5%

== Culture and contemporary life ==
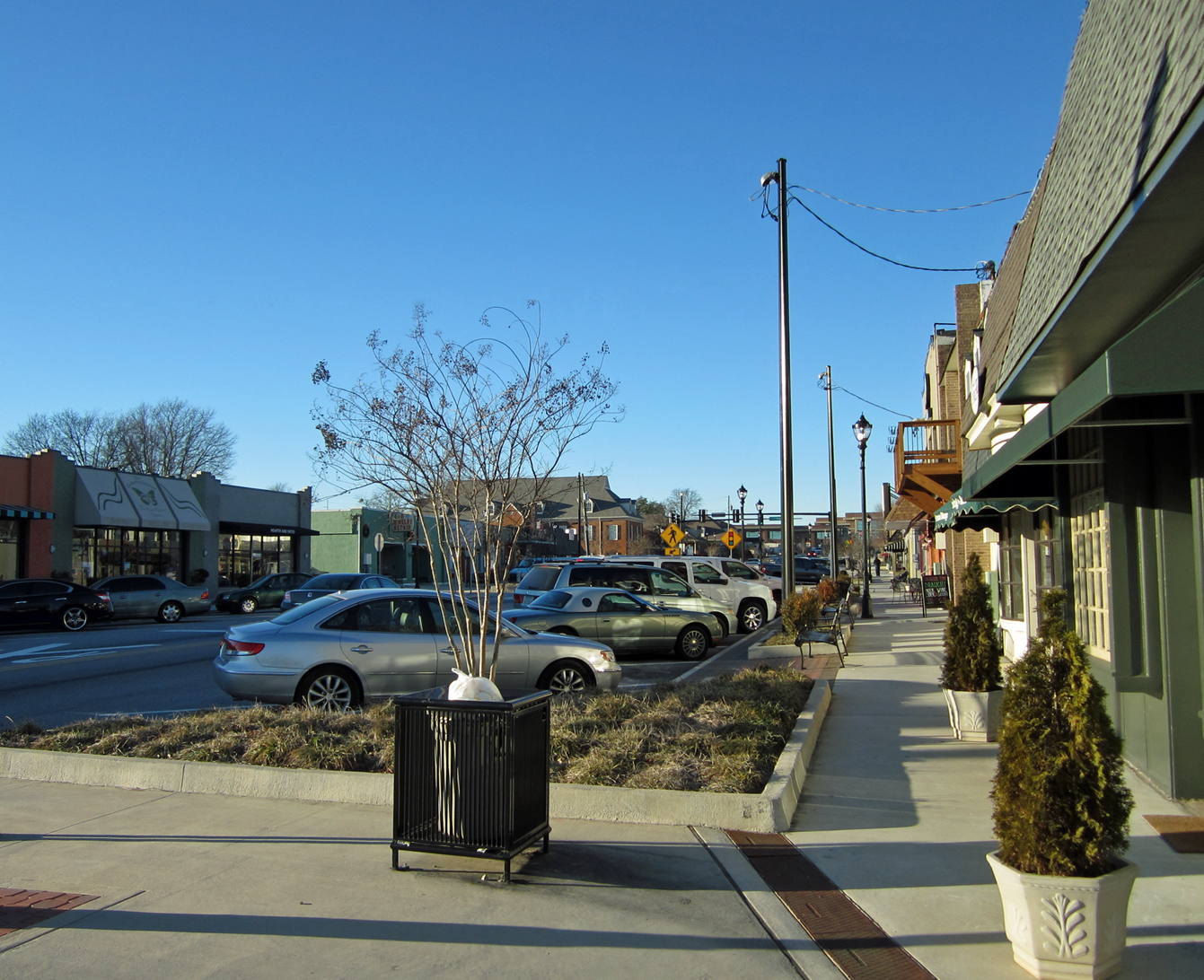
Downtown Tucker in January

Tucker primarily consists of 1960s and 1970s-era ranch and split-level homes, and 1970s and 1980s-era multi-story homes. The latter two often feature daylight basements. Various neighborhoods are typically groups by geographic association with elementary schools and other centers of community life such as parks.

=== Community organizations ===
The desire for community involvement continues to foster growth in various Tucker groups and associations. Some of the more significant include; the Tucker Business Association, Tucker-Northlake Community Improvement District, Tucker Civic Association, Tucker Historical Society, Main Street Theatre, Friends of Henderson Park, Friends of Johns Homestead, Friends of Kelley C. Cofer Park, Main Street Tucker Alliance, Friends of the Tucker Nature Preserve, Old Town Tucker Merchants Association, Tucker Parent Council, and Smoke Rise Community Association.

With the exception of sports organizations, involving residents in multiple counties, most of these groups are predominantly led by and serve residents within the Tucker area.

Tucker includes multiple Baptist, Lutheran, Methodist, Pentecostal, and Presbyterian churches; Catholic, Mormon, and over a dozen non-denomination Christian churches, some holding services in Chinese, Korean, Spanish, and Vietnamese. Several churches including Rehoboth Baptist, established in 1854, and First Baptist of Tucker, established in 1893, maintain large youth athletic programs. In the 1970s, The Church of Jesus Christ of Latter-day Saints built a regional welfare and emergency response center in Royal Atlanta Business Park.

=== Outdoor events ===
Outdoor events held on Main Street are a central part of the community for numerous residents and organizations. The Tucker Day celebration, first held in the 1950s, is an annual event typically including a parade, that runs the length of Main Street with food vendors, artist, musicians, and merchants. Other annual events on Main Street include the Taste of Tucker and Tucker Chili Cook-Off. The street is also closed for the Tucker Cruise-In held monthly between April and September. The Farmers Market on Main Street has recently moved from its position in Downtown Tucker, to a venue just outside Downtown at a church on LaVista Rd.

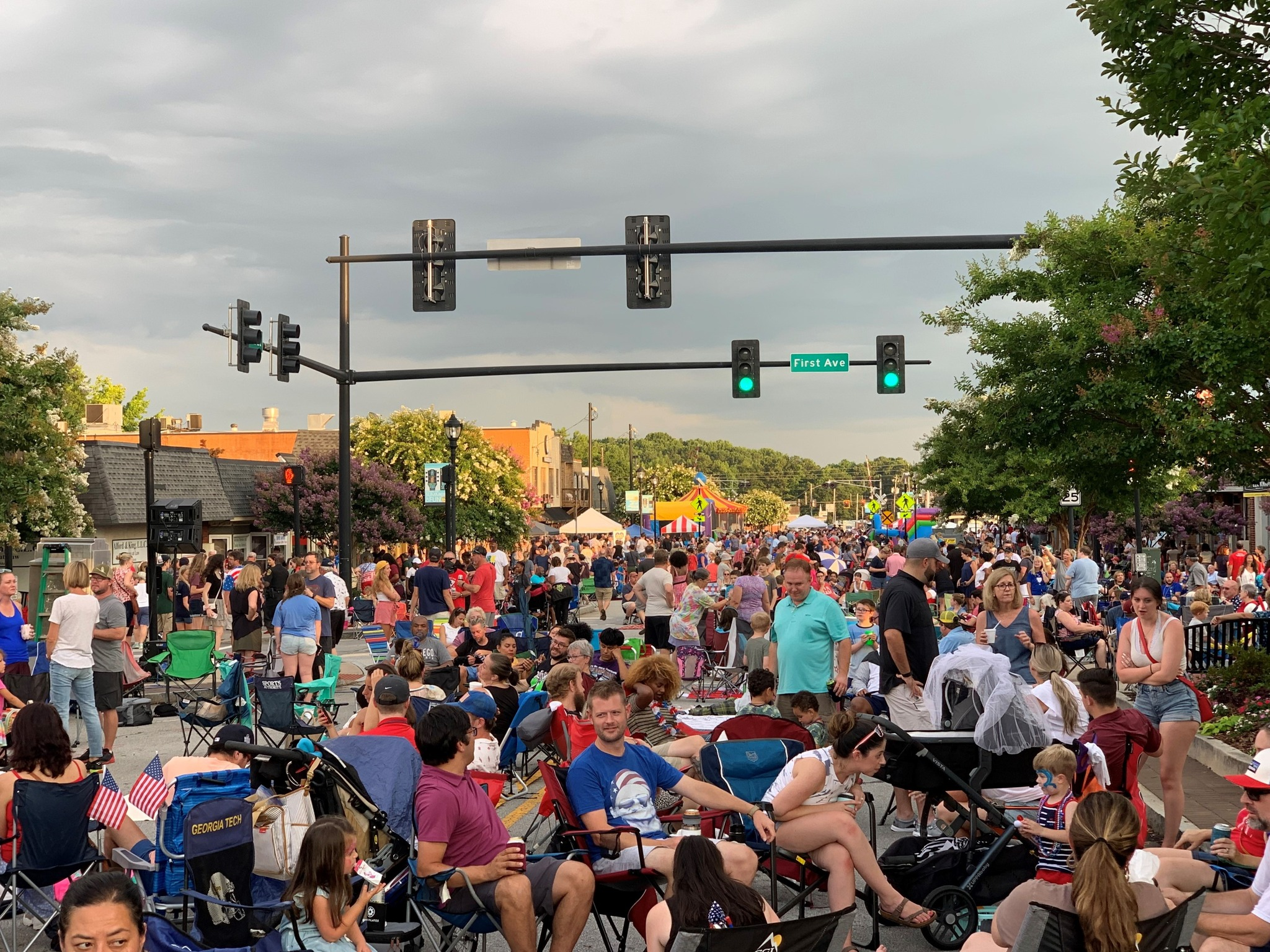
Independence Day Celebration on Main Street in Tucker, Georgia.

The Tucker Civic Association, Friends of Henderson Park, Friends of the Tucker Nature Preserve, Friends of Kelley C. Cofer Park, and neighborhood groups regularly organize park and roadside cleanup efforts. The Tucker Historical Society hosts the annual Brownings Courthouse Day and the annual Garden Tour.

The Tucker High School varsity football team, the Tucker Tigers, is a large seasonal draw for former and current Tucker alumni and residents. Like most high schools in DeKalb County, Tucker does not have a local football stadium, thus home games are technically away games.

=== Amateur sports ===
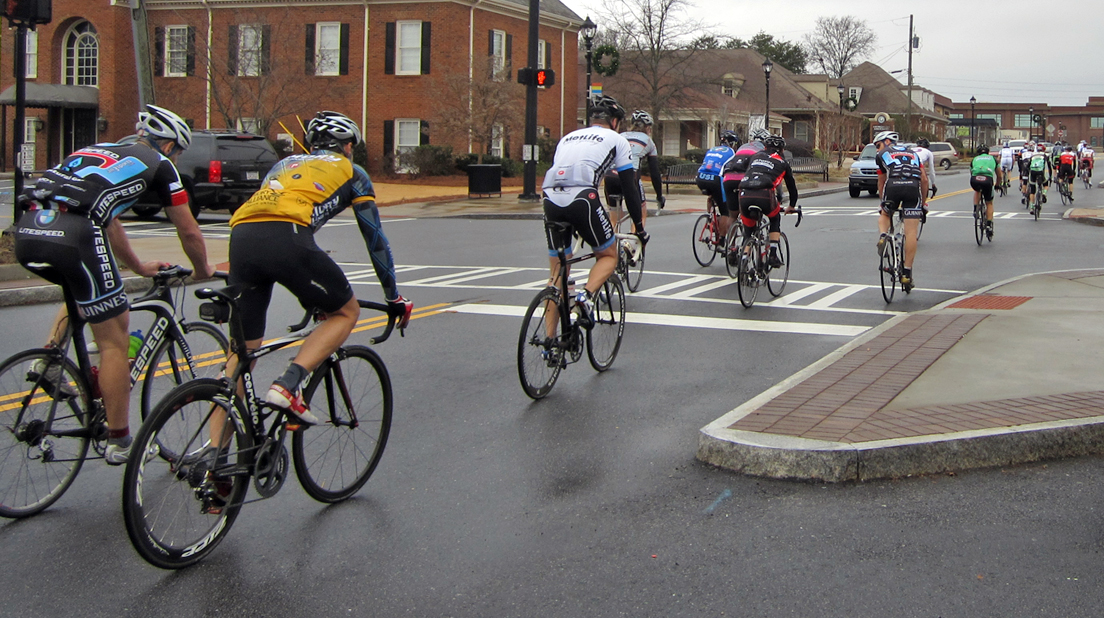
Cyclist completing the weekly 42-mile (68 km) "Tucker Ride".

Tucker Football League (TFL) and Triumph Youth Soccer Association (TYSA), formerly the Tucker Youth Soccer Association, are the two largest independent youth sports organizations in the community. TYSA is the largest in DeKalb County, and the fourth largest youth soccer association in Georgia. The TFL holds games and practices at the privately owned Fitzgerald Field. TYSA uses county fields at Henderson Park and the privately owned Granite – Patillo Field.

Adult sports include road bicycle racing. The weekly 42-mile (68 km) Tucker Ride and Baby Tucker. According to Southeastern Cycling, "This is where the big boys and racers show up to play." The Tucker ride maintains speeds over 24-mile (39 km) per hour. The Baby Tucker is slightly less strenuous at 20-mile (32 km) per hour.

== Economy ==
According to data from 2007, the Tucker CDP had 3,709 businesses, and the ethnic composition of the owners was as follows:

- Black or African-owned: 18.3%
- Asian-owned: 10.3%
- Indian and Alaska Native-owned: (Not available)
- Native Hawaiian and Other Pacific Islander-owned: (Fewer than 25 firms)
- White (Non-Hispanic): 71.3%

More demographic figures:

- Hispanics (of any race) were 4.7% of the owners
- Women were 28.8% of the owners

Tucker serves as corporate headquarters for several nationally recognized companies including; Oglethorpe Power, YP Holdings (Publisher of The Real Yellow Pages), Primo Grills and Smokers, and Inland Seafood. Tucker is also home of the U.S. Poultry & Egg Association the Emory University Orthopaedics and Spine Hospital, the Montreal Industrial district, a portion of the Northlake retail area, and Royal Atlanta Business Park.

=== Community Improvement Districts ===
In February 2013, DeKalb County Board of Commissioners approved the formation of the Tucker Community Improvement District (CID). In August 2014 the Tucker CID changed its name to Tucker-Northlake CID to reflect expansion into the Northlake business district. Tucker is also home to the Stone Mountain CID along Mountain Industrial Boulevard.

Commercial property owners in both districts vote on a self-imposed millage rate increase and use the funds for community improvements. The tax and millage rate increase applies to commercial property only and not residential. Under Georgia law CID funds may be used for street and road construction and maintenance, parks and recreation area, public transportation, and other services. CID investments are often leveraged through state and local grants increasing return on investment.

== Government ==
Tucker is in Georgia's 4th and 6th Congressional Districts; Georgia State Senate Districts 40 and 41; and Georgia House of Representatives House Districts 81, 86, 87, and 88. Tucker is in DeKalb County Commission Districts 1 and 4 and Super Commission District 7.

In a November 2015 referendum, 74% of voters approved incorporating Tucker into a city. In March 2016, residents elected Frank Auman the city's first mayor, and Honey VanDeKreke, Matt Robbins, Michelle Penkava, William Rosenfield, Noelle Monferdini, and Anne Lerner its inaugural city council. The city seal that was adopted was designed by Jay Hicks

== Education ==
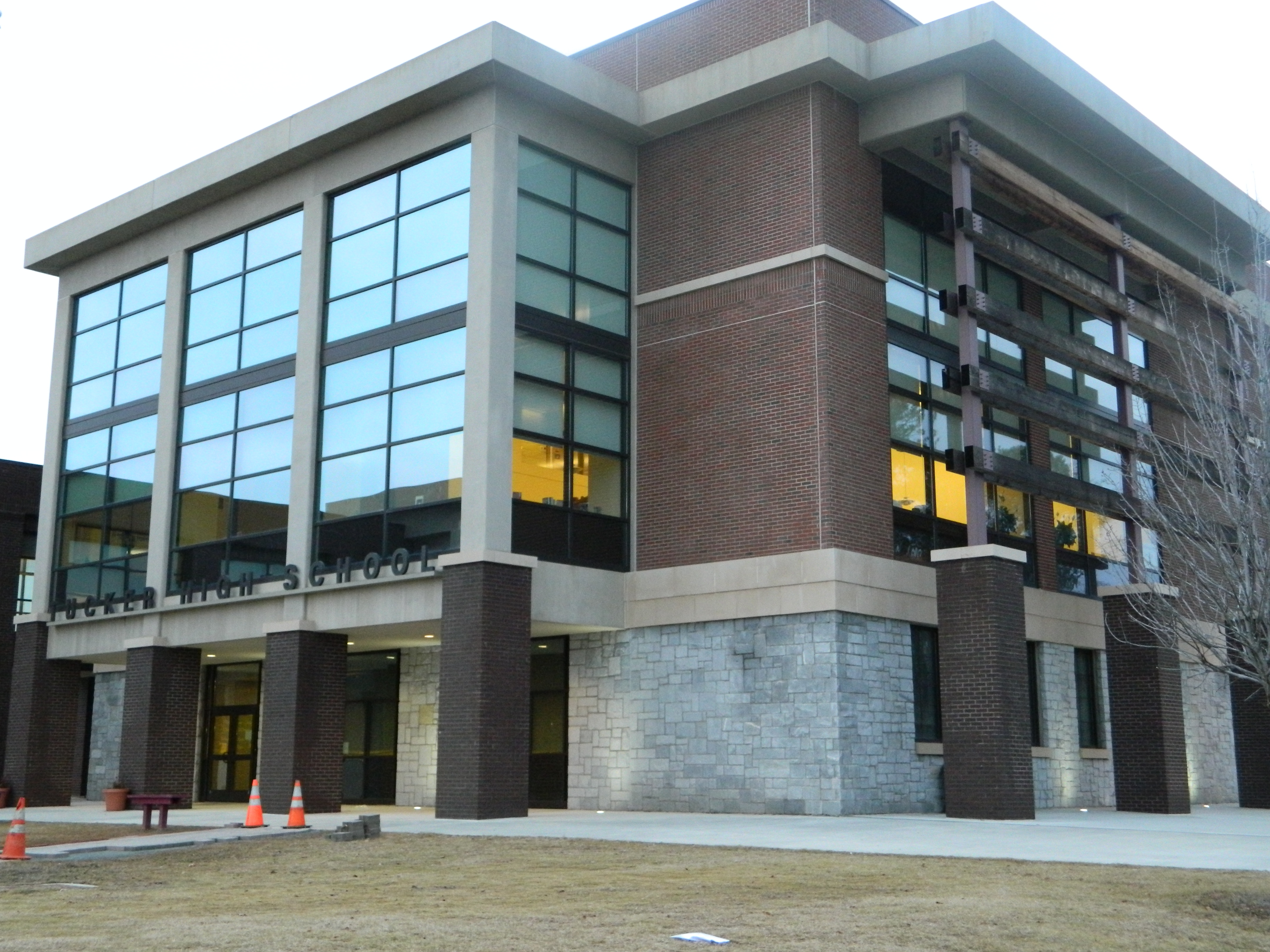
Tucker High School 2013

In the Tucker CDP, 91.4% of adults have graduated high school, 7% higher than the state average, and 46.8% of adults age 25 or older have a bachelor's degree or higher, 19% higher than the state average.

=== Primary and secondary education ===
All public schools in Tucker operate under the jurisdiction DeKalb County School District. Tucker is served by portions of three DeKalb County high school clusters, including eight schools located in the city and seven schools located south and west of the city.

=== Elementary schools ===
- Briarlake Elementary School
- Brockett Elementary School
- Evansdale Elementary School
- Henderson Mill Elementary School
- Idlewood Elementary School
- Livsey Elementary School
- Midvale Elementary School
- Smoke Rise Charter Elementary School
- Stone Mill Elementary School
- Stone Mountain Elementary School

=== Middle school ===
- Henderson Middle School
- Stone Mountain Middle School
- Tucker Middle School

=== High school ===
- Lakeside High School
- Stone Mountain High School
- Tucker High School

== Infrastructure ==
Tucker owes the origins of its infrastructure in large measure to the efforts of former DeKalb County Commissioner, Scott Candler Sr. In the 1940s and 50s Candler brought resources typically reserved for cities to rural communities. Road improvements, public safety, water, and library resources were pushed to the far ends of the County under his administration. Tucker residents continued the tradition of expansion by maintaining and improving these resources throughout the 1960s, 70s, and 80s. Local businesses like Cofer Brothers, a lumber and supply company, thrived under the mid-century housing boom.

DeKalb County continues to acquire green space in Tucker, invest in road improvement projects, and work with local committees and organizations to improve the area.

=== Livable Centers Initiative ===
In 2000, the Tucker Civic Association adopted a Neighborhood Strategic Plan created to assist in identifying goals and policies from the 1996 DeKalb County Comprehensive Land Use Plan, and to make recommendations for strategic planning and development of the Tucker neighborhood identity. In 2005, the Atlanta Regional Commission issued Tucker a grant for the development of a Livable Cities Initiative (LCI). The LCI study focused to reestablishing Main Street as a central point for the greater Tucker community, create a more pedestrian-friendly and interconnected town center by encouraging walking and other modes of transportation to and around the commercial core.

=== Police, fire and rescue ===
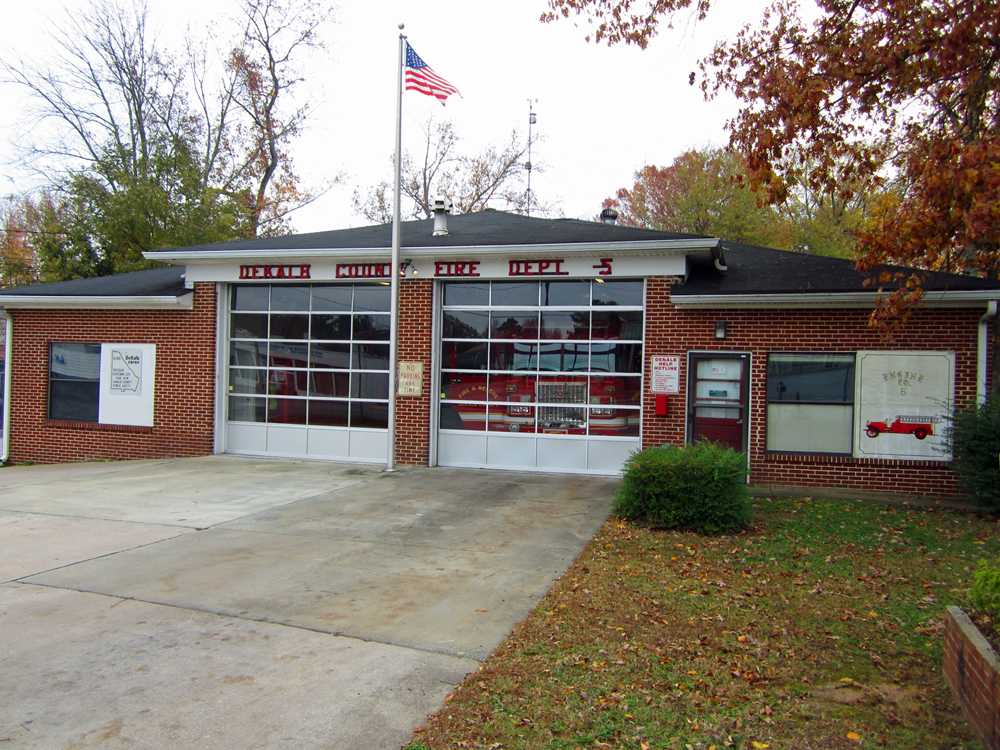
DeKalb Fire Station 5

In 2006 the DeKalb County Police Department headquarters relocated to Tucker off Northlake Parkway. The Tucker Precinct is located next to the Cofer Crossing Shopping Center.

Tucker is also home to DeKalb County Fire and Rescue Department's Station 5 on Lawrenceville Hwy, and Station 22 on Montreal Road. The portion of Tucker in Gwinnett County is serviced by Gwinnett Police Department, North and South Precincts, and by Gwinnett County Fire Department Station 2 on Harmony Grove Road.

=== Parks and recreation ===
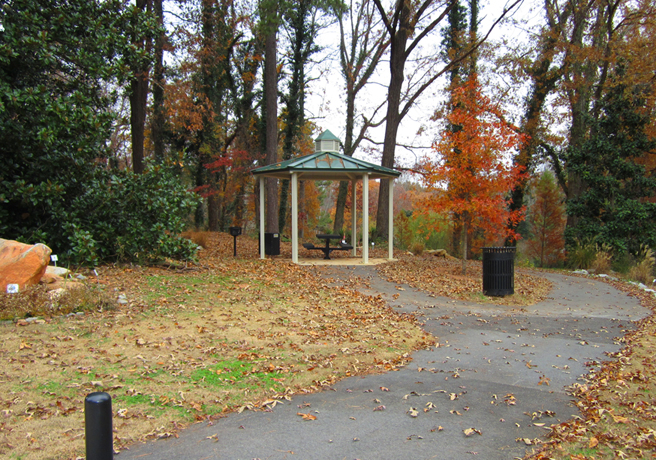
Gazebo at Henderson Park

The Tucker zip code is home to over 230 acres (93 ha) of DeKalb County parks and recreation areas including lakes, creeks, trails, tennis courts, baseball and soccer fields, a swimming pool, and playgrounds.

- Henderson Park
- Johns' Homestead (Undeveloped)
- Kelley C. Cofer Park
- Montreal Park
- Peters Park
- Smoke Rise Park
- Tucker Nature Preserve
- Tucker Recreational Center (formerly Tucker Elementary School)
- Rosenfeld Park

=== Public libraries ===
The DeKalb County Public Library operates two branches in Tucker. The Tucker-Reid H. Cofer Library, and the Northlake-Barbara Loar Library.

The Tucker-Reid H. Cofer area branch open on Church Street in 1965. In 2010, the library moved to a 25,000-square-foot (2,300 m^{2}) facility at the intersection of LaVista Road and Lawrenceville Highway. The new facility received LEED Gold Certification from the U.S. Green Building Council.

In 1991, the county built a second library on LaVista Road in Tucker, the Northlake Barbara-Loar community branch, approximately 3.4 miles (5.5 km) west of the Tucker-Reid H. Cofer branch. In 2009, the library expanded from 10,000 to 15,000 square feet (930 to 1,390 m^{2}).

== Transportation ==
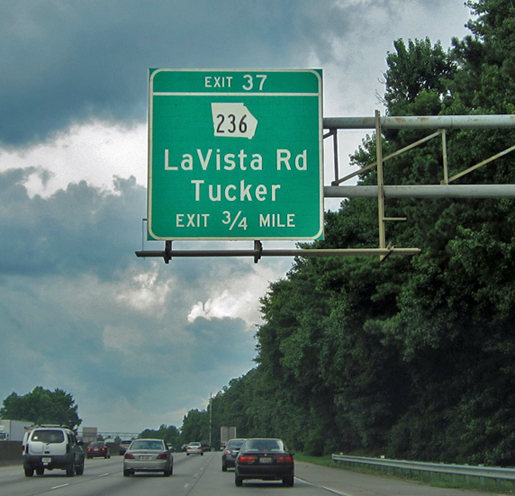
Lavista Road, Tucker, exit 37 on I-285

=== Rapid-transit ===
MARTA, the Metro Atlanta Rapid Transit Authority, has nine daily bus routes traversing Tucker connected commuters to four heavy rail stations south and west of the city.

=== Interstate highways ===
- Interstate 285
- Interstate 85

=== U.S. highways ===
- U.S. Route 29
- U.S. Route 78

=== State routes ===
- State Route 8
- State Route 236
- State Route 407
- State Route 410

=== Pedestrians and cycling ===
- Stone Mountain Trail
- Tucker Path

== Notable people ==
- Asher Allen, professional football player (NFL Minnesota Vikings)
- A. J. Bouye, professional football player (NFL Denver Broncos)
- Stephen Hill, professional football player (NFL New York Jets)
- Seantavius Jones, professional football player (NFL New Orleans Saints)
- Brendan O'Brien, record producer, mixer, engineer, and musician
- Patrick Pass, professional football player (NFL New England Patriots and others)
- Kyle Sieg, NASCAR driver
- Ryan Sieg, NASCAR driver
- Shane Sieg, NASCAR driver
- Andy Stanley, founder and preacher of North Point Community Church and satellite churches
- Steve Walsh, keyboardist and vocalist for American rock band Kansas, is a Tucker resident.
