= Warrior Care Network =

U.S. military veteran mental health program

- Warrior Care Network logo
- Abbreviation: WCN
- Formation: 2015
- Type: NGO, NPO
- Purpose: PTSD treatment for veterans
- Locations: Los Angeles, Atlanta, Boston, Chicago
- Region served: United States
- Parent organization: Wounded Warrior Project
- Website: Official website

Warrior Care Network is a mental health program that provides care, travel, and accommodations at no cost for United States veterans and their families. Treatment options consist of intensive outpatient care, mainly focusing on post-traumatic stress disorder (PTSD) and traumatic brain injury (TBI), military sexual trauma (MST), and related conditions such as anxiety and depression. Warrior Care Network began accepting veterans into the program on January 15, 2016. It was created by a joint effort between Wounded Warrior Project, the U.S. Department of Veterans Affairs and partners consisting of four academic medical research hospitals located throughout the United States. The four programs are Operation Mend at UCLA Health, the Veterans Program at Emory Healthcare, Road Home at Rush University Medical Center, and Home Base, a Red Sox Foundation and Massachusetts General Hospital Program.

Initial cost of the project was $100 million which was funded by a three-year grant from Wounded Warrior Project and its treatment center medical partners.

On October 23, 2018, Wounded Warrior Project announced a reinvestment of $160 million to the Warrior Care Network. In 2024, it invested another $100 million to fund programs aimed at alleviating depression, anxiety, and substance use disorders among post-9/11 veterans.

Warrior Care Network offers evidence-based individual psychotherapy for PTSD, including prolonged exposure (PE) or cognitive processing therapy (CPT).

== Medical PTSD treatment centers ==
=== Los Angeles, CA ===
In 2007, UCLA Health created the Operation Mend Program via a partnership with the U.S. military and the Department of Veterans Affairs. In 2010, Operation Mend began treating PTSD and symptoms of mild to moderate TBI. There is no charge for the patient. Operation Mend handles all the planning burdens associated with medical care. This includes booking flights and scheduling medical appointments. Operation Mend provides a veterans program which includes two to three weeks at the PTSD treatment center, followed by three weeks care from home via telecommuting and social networking.

In 2015, it joined the Warrior Care Network and expanded its veteran reconstructive surgery program to include mental health care from neurology, neurosurgery, psychiatry and integrative specialists.

In 2015, Wounded Warrior Project committed a $15.7 million grant over three years for UCLA Health to expand the Operation Mend Program. The grant funded a new three-week intensive treatment program for post-9/11 era service members, veterans, and their families living with the challenges of mild TBI and PTSD. All expenses for the veterans, including travel and housing, are covered by Operation Mend.

=== Atlanta, GA ===
Emory Healthcare Veterans Program joined Warrior Care Network in June 2015. It received a $15 million grant and was required to raise an additional $7.5 million over the next three years. Emory offers a military sexual trauma survivors program as part of the Warrior Care Network.

On September 17, 2018, Wounded Warrior Project continued to contribute to the Emory Healthcare Veterans Program with a five-year, $29.2 million grant to help expand space and treatment for veterans suffering from PTSD, TBI, depression, and anxiety.

The Emory Healthcare Veterans Program (EHVP) is a two-week intensive outpatient program (IOP) that offers daily prolonged exposure (PE) and clinically indicated adjunctive interventions. A 2018 study by the American Psychological Association found that a PE-based IOP model of treatment for PTSD in veterans leads to large improvements in PTSD and depression symptoms in two weeks. PTSD treatment programs historically have high drop-out rates, but Emory's program retains more than 90% of patients, according to Sheila Rauch, deputy director of the Emory HealthCare Veterans Program.

=== Boston, MA ===
The Red Sox Foundation and Massachusetts General Hospital Home Base Program were chosen to provide a PTSD treatment center in the northeast United States. Home Base joined the Warrior Care Network in 2015 and was slated to move into a building in the Navy Yard in Charlestown under the leadership of executive director Jack Hammond and chief operating officer Mike Allard. In September 2018, Home Base opened the National Center of Excellence in Charlestown, Massachusetts, to further assist veterans.

Home Base provided care to more than 1,600 clients in 2021, and about 400 veterans and service members go through the intensive program each year. The program includes daily group and individual therapy, as well as holistic classes such as tai chi, yoga, nutrition, and fitness. Veterans participate in group therapy with 10-12 people who have experienced similar situations. Patients receive about 70 hours of care, which equals about a year's worth of therapy in two weeks. Veterans also learn how to identify warning signs for suicidal thoughts, and how to follow a safety plan. All services, even those not covered by insurance, are free.

Researchers at Home Base and Harvard University are working with the social network RallyPoint to more accurately predict suicide risk among service members using machine learning.

=== Chicago, IL ===
Rush University Medical Center began the Road Home Program in 2014 to treat veterans and family members affected by PTSD and TBI related to military service. The program provides evidence-based treatment including cognitive processing therapy (CPT) and prolonged exposure (PE). CPT is recommended as a front-line treatment for PTSD. CPT has significant support for treating veterans with PTSD. The approach helps people develop more appropriate accommodated beliefs, which results in a changed emotional response and a reduction of PTSD symptoms. As of 2022, thousands of veterans have traveled from all over the country to receive care since Road Home started.

In 2015, Rush received a grant for $15 million from Wounded Warrior Project to develop its outpatient evaluation and treatment program and become part of the Warrior Care Network. Wounded Warrior Project also promised to match $2 to every $1 raised by Rush to develop its program, up to $2.5 million per year.

In 2018, Wounded Warrior Project donated $45 million to Rush University Medical Center. It was the largest donation Rush UMC ever received, and helped 5,000 veterans with PTSD receive free mental health care services.

== Eligibility for PTSD treatment ==
Veterans and active duty U.S. military with mental health conditions or injuries incurred during deployment on or after September 11, 2001 are eligible; there is no geographical restriction.

This includes US military members who have symptoms of PTSD, including military sexual trauma (MST), and/or traumatic brain injury (TBI) and/or co-morbid conditions related to their military service. A diagnosis is not required to be eligible. Eligible veterans must be able to travel and attend the program for two weeks.

Veterans who have been hospitalized for acute stabilization or suicide attempts in the last 30 days are ineligible.

To participate in the program and receive PTSD treatment at no cost, veterans, active duty military or caregivers must begin the screening process by contacting the Resource Center on the Wounded Warrior Project official website.

== PTSD treatments offered ==
Warrior Care Network provides mental health care by offering intensive PTSD treatments. Warrior Care Network has four programs, including Operation Mend at UCLA Health, the Veterans Program at Emory Healthcare, Road Home at Rush University Medical Center, and Home Base, a Red Sox Foundation and Massachusetts General Hospital Program. The program can be used by veterans who have not already received mental health care or in addition to ongoing treatments for combat-related PTSD. Service treatment strategies include comprehensive medical reviews, individual therapy, group therapy sessions, fitness education, family support, and therapies such as meditation, acupuncture and qi gong. Families are also included in the treatment and can receive training on therapy for trauma that affects concentration and memory. Therapy can be performed in group or individual sessions.

Warrior Care Network data released by Emory University, shows that participants who complete the program experience a significant improvement in PTSD and depression symptoms that are maintained up to one year.

Prolonged exposure (PE) is a best practice PTSD treatment that repeatedly exposes the patient to triggers or distressful thoughts related to the traumatic event, allowing the patient to learn how to manage resulting distress and deal with memories that had been avoided. Exposure therapy is performed at the Emory Healthcare Veterans Program using virtual reality sessions with a therapist, allowing the patient to talk through experiences.

== Wounded Warrior Project's role ==
Registration for the program is conducted through the Wounded Warrior Project (WWP) website.

Wounded Warrior Project initiated the Warrior Care Network after performing a survey of veterans in 2014, finding over 76% of respondents had an untreated traumatic battle experience despite existing veterans' benefits for PTSD.

Warrior Care Network physicians are trained in military culture and the veterans undergoing treatment do so in a cohort with other veterans that have had similar experiences. According to Dr. Erin Fletcher, Director of Warrior Care Network, "having this sense of connection and belonging and this feeling of being understood is so incredibly important to the healing process."

The program is designed to improve overall industry treatment and best practices for PTSD by tracking data and sharing results. According to former WWP Chief Program Officer Jeremy Chwat, "Tapping into private health care [in conjunction with what is offered at Veterans Affairs] is something we think can benefit not only the warriors in our program but those who are accessing mental health treatment at the VA and other programs."

WWP funded $15.7 million toward each of the four medical partners, a total of $62.8 million. Each medical partner develops two to three week intensive treatment programs to provide individualized care tailored to each patient and his or her family members. During the founding of Warrior Care Network, Wounded Warrior Project orchestrated an agreement with the United States Department of Veterans Affairs (VA), allowing the VA to share records with the treatment centers.
