= Wounded Warrior Project =

American non-profit organization

Wounded Warrior Project, CFC #11425
- Formation: 2003
- Type: Nonprofit 501(C)(3) Corporation
- Purpose: Veterans services
- Headquarters: Jacksonville, Florida
- CEO: Walter E. Piatt
- Key people: Lt. Gen. (Ret.) Ken Hunzeker (Board Chair); Lt. Col. (Ret.) Bill Selman (Board Vice Chair)
- Staff: 680
- Website: woundedwarriorproject.org

Wounded Warrior Project (WWP) is an American charity and veterans service organization that operates as a nonprofit 501(c)(3). WWP offers a variety of programs, services and events for wounded veterans who incurred a physical or mental injury, illnesses, or co-incident to their military service on or after September 11, 2001. Military family members and caregivers are also eligible for WWP programs.

As of August 22, 2021, WWP served 157,975 registered alumni and 40,520 registered family support members. Since its formation, the organization has partnered with several charities they deem community partners, including the American Red Cross, Resounding Joy, a music therapy group in California, and Operation Homefront. In July 2022, WWP partnered with a total of twenty-eight veteran service organizations who collectively received grants totalling over $5.9 million. WWP has also previously provided a year-long Track program, which helped veterans transition to college and the workplace.

WWP allocates 71 percent of its revenue to programs and services for wounded veterans and their families, and the remaining balance pays to support those programs.

WWP is recognized under the Combined Federal Campaign (CFC) workplace giving program of the federal government of the United States with CFC #11425.

In October 2025, the number of WWP registered members reached 300,000.

== Overview ==
WWP offers a variety of no-cost programs, services, and events for wounded veterans and veteran families. It runs several support programs. Warrior Care Network is a mental wellness program offering post-traumatic stress disorder (PTSD) and traumatic brain injury (TBI) treatment through four academic medical centers in the United States. Warriors to Work is a program that connects veterans with employers and resources for jobs. Project Odyssey is an adventure-based program that provides group activities and psychoeducational sessions. Soldier Ride is a cycling program. The Independence Program provides veterans with occupational therapy, social workers, and rehab counselors.

WWP supports warriors in their transition to civilian life by providing job training, aiding in the navigation of veteran and disability benefits, offering emergency financial assistance, and delivering comprehensive long-term financial education. These services are becoming increasingly important as veterans are feeling the effects of inflation in 2023. WWP's Annual Survey found that in 2023 nearly 39% of wounded veterans did not have enough food for an active, healthy life.

== History ==
Wounded Warrior Project was founded in 2003 in Roanoke, Virginia by John Melia. Melia had been severely wounded in a helicopter crash while serving in Somalia in 1992. Melia assembled backpacks distributed to injured veterans at the former Bethesda Naval Hospital (now the Walter Reed National Military Medical Center) and Walter Reed Army Medical Center.

Wounded Warrior Project initially operated as a division of the United Spinal Association of New York, which adopted WWP as a program in November 2003. WWP continued to support injured service members by providing them with free WWP Backpacks filled with comfort items.

In September 2005, The United Spinal Association granted $2.7 million to WWP to "develop into a stand-alone charity with its own identity and programs," with the intent to expand its services from providing immediate comfort items to providing longer-term support for returning wounded veterans via compensation, education, health care, insurance, housing, employment, etc.

The WWP Backpacks program remains a central activity of WWP, evidenced by the more than 65,000 backpacks the organization has distributed since 2018 in support of transitioning U.S. military veterans.

In 2015, the journalist Tim Mak reported for The Daily Beast that WWP was selling donor information to third parties and suing small charities using the phrase “wounded warrior” or logo silhouettes of soldiers; he also accused WWP of compensating its top officers overly generously. The following January, these allegations were picked up by CBS and The New York Times, whose reports of WWP’s use of its funds on lavish company retreats and personal enrichment of its officers aroused more public attention and led the charity to fire its then- CEO, Steven Nardizzi, and then- COO, Al Giordano. Several former employees alleged that they were fired because they had raised concerns over the mismanagement.

WWP hired a new CEO in July 2016, Michael Linnington, a retired Lieutenant general in the U.S. Army. He has increased the scrutiny on spending for travel and all expenses throughout the organization. Linnington retired in early 2024 after eight years leading the organization.

In April 2021, WWP partnered with the White House's Joining Forces and the Elizabeth Dole Foundation to provide supportive programming and bring awareness to the children of wounded, ill or injured veterans. A 2021 survey found that there are approximately 2.3 million American children under 18 living with veterans with disabilities.

In 2024, retired Major Gen. Walter E. Piatt, was named chief executive officer of Wounded Warrior Project. Piatt is a former commander of Fort Drum and the 10th Mountain Division. During his tenure as commander he worked to better connect Fort Drum to the North Country community. Piatt deployed with the division's headquarters battalion from March to August 2018, after which he released a paper about the Iraqi people's commitment to achieving peace for their nation after years of warfare.

== Incorporation ==
Wounded Warrior Project registered for incorporation on February 23, 2005. WWP was granted accreditation as of September 10, 2008, by the Veterans Affairs Secretary as a Veterans Service Organization (VSO) "recognized by the Secretary for the purpose of preparation, presentation, and prosecution of claims under laws administered by the Department of Veterans Affairs." The Veterans Administration's online List of Representatives for Accredited Organizations includes contact information for WWP's accredited service officers. as well as a search tool to access information about other VSOs.

In July 2006, Wounded Warrior Project's headquarters were moved to Jacksonville, Florida. WWP Founder John Melia cited a strong local veteran community, access to Jacksonville International Airport, and support from the local business community, specifically the PGA Tour, as the reason for the move. The WWP headquarters underwent a major $1.3 million renovation according to the Jacksonville Business Journal.

== Veterans and military support programs ==
=== Mental wellness ===
Wounded Warrior Project provides interactive programs, rehabilitation retreats, and free mental health counseling. WWP's outpatient care and therapy sessions through Warrior Care Network provide PTSD and TBI treatment alongside four academic medical centers in the United States, including Emory Healthcare Veterans Program. Through Warrior Care Network, Wounded Warrior Project also offers treatment for veterans with PTSD using virtual reality therapy.

Mental health issues account for three of the top four most common service-connected injuries among veterans registered with WWP who served either on or after 9/11, and 3 out of 4 of these veterans reported post-traumatic stress. Many veterans report experiencing anxiety and depression, according to a WWP survey, and half of veterans report moderate to severe symptoms of two or more mental health conditions.

In 2020, Wounded Warrior Project surveyed nearly 30,000 injured veterans who served after the terrorist attacks of September 11, 2001, and found that over half reported declines in their mental health during the pandemic.

Wounded Warrior Project launched WWP Talk in 2014. The program, which connects veterans to the charity's staff members for weekly emotional support phone calls, saw a 35% increase in phone calls compared to the previous year during the COVID-19 pandemic.

In October 2022, a dozen veterans with Wounded Warrior Project completed a 400-mile motorcycle ride in California encouraging positive mental health, coinciding with National Motorcycle Ride Day and World Mental Health Day. The ride made stops in Ventura, Santa Clarita, Solvang, Santa Ynez, and the Santa Monica Mountains.

In November 2022, Wounded Warrior Project hosted a 17-mile hike to honor the 17 veterans who die each day by suicide.

=== Warriors to Work ===
Warriors to Work is a WWP veteran employment program that connects veterans with employers and resources for jobs. Through career counseling, including resume building, interview preparation, and salary negotiation assistance, veterans can find work that best fits their skill sets and allows them to smoothly transition into civilian life.

=== Family support programs ===
Wounded Warrior Project helps families of veterans reconnect through events that support family bonding and transitional skills. By providing the space and time for veterans to spend with their loved ones, the transition from service member to civilian becomes easier. Through their veteran family support programs, Wounded Warrior Project also helps guide families through the complicated process of receiving VA benefits.

=== Warrior Care Network ===
Warrior Care Network is an initiative providing access to high-quality care for veterans mainly dealing with post-traumatic stress disorder (PTSD) and traumatic brain injury (TBI). Established in 2016, the $100 million project included four PTSD treatment centers in Atlanta, Boston, Los Angeles, and Chicago. In October 2018, Wounded Warrior Project announced a $160 million investment in the mental health care of wounded veterans. In 2024, it invested another $100 million to fund programs for post-9/11 veterans that aim to reduce depression, anxiety, and substance use disorders.

From 2005 to 2016, the suicide rate among U.S. veterans increased almost 26 percent. Starting in 2016, Warrior Care Network provided care that includes group therapy with other veterans to learn coping strategies, such as yoga and meditation. According to a Georgia Public Broadcasting article, programs like Warrior Care Network's are likely contributing to the declining rate of suicide among former service members in the state of Georgia, where rates were significantly lower than the national veteran suicide rate in 2022. Overall, suicide rates for veterans peaked in 2018 and then fell in 2019 and 2020 by 9.7%.

=== Project Odyssey ===
Project Odyssey is an "adventure-based learning program" that provides veterans from all branches of the armed services an opportunity to work together in group activities and psychoeducational sessions. Through the Project Odyssey program, veterans can engage with other veterans with similar interests, such as motorcycle riding. Rolling Project Odyssey offers a series of group rides for veterans.

=== Soldier Ride ===
For the past 20 years, Wounded Warrior Project has organized its annual Soldier Ride, a multi-day cycling program. The Soldier Ride originated from the initiative of a single cyclist, Chris Carney, who in 2003 completed a 5,000-mile coast-to-coast journey to honor post-9/11 injured veterans. Carney was a bartender at the Stephen Talkhouse in Amagansett, NY and was drinking beers after his shift with Talkhouse partners, Peter Honerkamp and Nick Kraus, when they came up with this idea to help wounded veterans. Since then, Soldier Ride has organized events in cities across the United States. The rides focus on improving the management of stress, anxiety, and depression, and ways to mitigate the risk of suicide. In 2008, the tradition to start the race from the White House began.

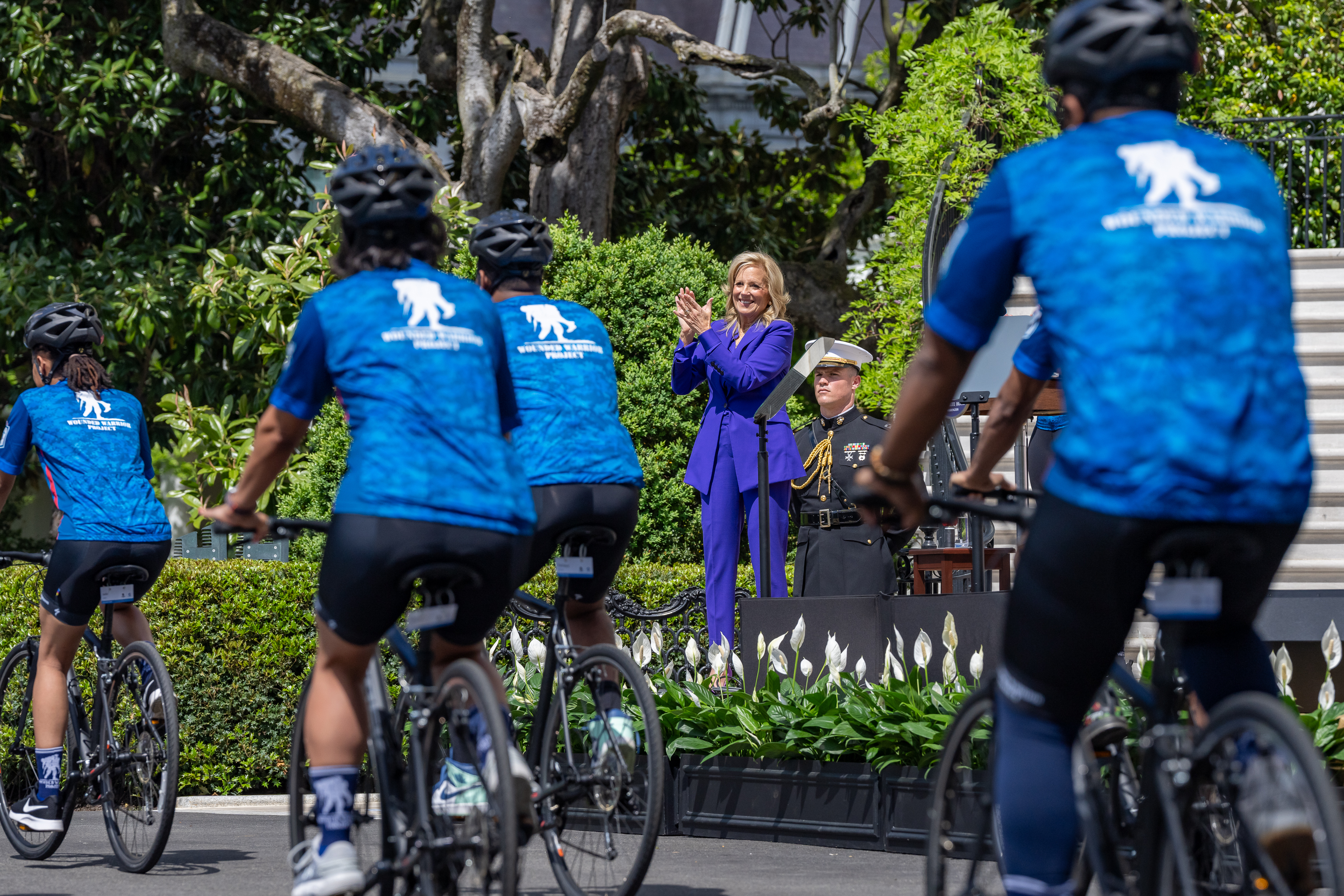
First Lady Jill Biden cheers on bicycle riders during the Wounded Warrior Project Soldier Ride, 2024

WWP provides all participants with adaptive cycling equipment or necessary modifications at no cost. Soldier Ride events also provide veterans with opportunities to network with other veterans and communities across the country.

In April 2023, a Soldier Ride started in Annapolis, Maryland, and ended in Lorton, Virginia. The nearly 30 participants visited the White House and met Vice President Kamala Harris. The January 2023 ride featured a 3-day bike ride starting in Miami, Florida, and ending in the Florida Keys. Participants in the ride were also invited to interact with dolphins at the Dolphin Research Center in the Florida Keys. In 2022, participants were invited to the White House to start the ride, where they were welcomed by President Joe Biden and First Lady Jill Biden. There was also a ride in the Chicago area in 2022, in which participants cycled about 60 miles in 3 days.

=== Independence Program ===
Wounded Warrior Project's Independence Program offers support to veterans with brain injuries, spinal cord injuries, or other neurological conditions, and their caregivers. This program is for recovering veterans that are transitioning from a medical facility to their home environment to allow them to rely on themselves and become functionally independent. Through the program, veterans gain access to occupational therapy, social workers and rehab counselors on-site where they live, without having to pay any out of pocket costs. In 2020, Wounded Warrior Project invested $7.25 million to support veteran and military caregivers.

=== Carry Forward ===
Wounded Warrior Project started its Carry Forward 5K run/walk in 2018. The event takes place in cities WWP is located in across the country, including San Diego, California; Jacksonville, Florida; San Antonio, Texas; and Nashville, Tennessee. Participants can also host virtual events to raise money to support WWP's free services for veterans, including mental health, career counseling and long-term rehabilitative care. Participants of Carry Forward can carry flags, weights, or another person to represent the responsibilities veterans carry during their service and to show support for veterans' sacrifice.

== Government affairs ==
The Government Affairs team advocates for legislation that helps veterans and their supporters. Several bills have passed, including the Traumatic Injury Protection Program (TSGLI), the Caregivers and Veterans Omnibus Health Services Act of 2010, the Ryan Kules and Paul Benne Specially Adaptive Housing Improvement Act of 2019, the Veteran Families Financial Support Act (2020) and the PACT Act (2022). WWP's legislative agenda is guided by the information in the organization's Annual Warrior Alumni Survey and encompasses issue areas spanning from veteran brain health and toxic exposure to women veteran issues.

In March 2014, WWP testified before Congress strongly supporting the bill "To amend title 38, United States Code, to provide veterans with counseling and treatment for sexual trauma that occurred during inactive duty training (H.R. 2527; 113th Congress)". The bill would extend a VA program of counseling, care and services for military sexual trauma that occurred during active duty or active duty for training to veterans who experienced such trauma during inactive duty training. The bill would alter current law, which allows access to such counseling only to active duty members of the military, so that members of the Reserves and National Guard would be eligible.

The WWP did a study of its alumni and found that, "almost half of the respondents indicated accessing care through VA for MST-related conditions was 'very difficult'. And of those who did not seek VA care, 41% did not know they were eligible for such care." The WWP also testified that in addition to expanding access to MST care, the VA needed to improve care itself, because veterans report "inadequate screening, providers who were either insensitive or lacked needed expertise and facilities ill-equipped to appropriately care for MST survivors."

In 2016, Wounded Warrior Project, along with 13 other veterans service organizations, lobbied for lawmakers to secure IVF funding for combat-wounded veterans.

In 2020, Wounded Warrior Project's Legislative Director, Derek Fronabarger, worked with Jon Stewart from The Daily Show to advocate on Toxic Exposure related issues for service members and veterans.

In 2022, Jose Ramos, vice president of government and community relations for the Wounded Warrior Project announced support, on behalf of WWP, for the Maj. Richard Star amendment, a House Bill that would make disabled war veterans with under 20 years of active service eligible for both disability and retirement benefits. In 2025, the WWP was still making the Maj. Richard Star Act a legislative priority with advocacy campaigns held in May. The proposal concerns 53,000 combat-injured service members that retired before 20 years of service due to medical reasons.

In 2026, the WWP joined the coalition of 23 veteran-service organizations that showed support for the 62-bill Take Care of America’s Veterans Act.

== Controversy ==
On May 27, 2014, Wounded Warrior Project filed a lawsuit against Dean Graham, a disabled veteran with PTSD, and his Help Indiana Vets, Inc. organization. After a court ruling, Graham retracted the allegations he leveled against Wounded Warrior Project and folded his direct-aid non-profit.

Wounded Warrior Project filed a lawsuit in October 2014 seeking damages and court costs against a Blandon, Pennsylvania, non-profit, Keystone Wounded Warriors, claiming confusing similarities between the Keystone and WWP logo; Hampton Roads, VA Channel 3 TV covered the Keystone story on April 30, 2015, and Nonprofit Quarterly covered the story with a title asking, is WWP "a 'Neighborhood Bully' among Veterans Groups?" Tim Mak also covered the suit for the Daily Beast.

After a reporter for the Tacoma, Washington News Tribune informed disabled veteran Airman Alex Graham, a blogger at the conspiracy website Veterans Today, of a pending lawsuit against him by the WWP, he removed his articles critical of their policies, later retracting his criticisms and issuing a public apology.

In 2016 and 2017, subsequent investigations by a Jacksonville, FL television station and the U.S. Senate Judiciary Committee found that WWP "'inaccurately' reported the money it spent on veterans' programs by using 'inflated' numbers and 'misleading' advertisements."

In February 2017, the Better Business Bureau gave WWP a clean bill of financial health. A 2016 review said some media reporting contained information that was inaccurate.

== Donations and spending ==
In 2012, WWP spent US$114,817,090 on programs in support of wounded veterans, their families, and caregivers. From October 2022 through March 2023, WWP provided emergency financial assistance to approximately 1,800 registered veterans and their families, up from 657 the previous year. Each family typically receives several thousand dollars to help cover bills and expenses.

In 2013, a new employee mistakenly declined to accept a donation from Liberty Baptist Church in Fort Pierce, Florida, and issued this inadvertent statement to the church leaders in an email, "We must decline the opportunity to be the beneficiary of your event due to our fundraising event criteria, which doesn't allow community events to be religious in nature." Shortly after the church received this letter, a WWP spokesperson apologized and said that it was a miscommunication.

In June 2015, The Daily Beast reported that the WWP sells its donor information to third parties. It also alleged that WWP distributed what it deemed an insubstantial percentage of donations to actual wounded warriors, and that it overpaid its executive staff.

In January 2016, The New York Times reported that only 60 percent of the revenue of the Wounded Warrior Project was spent on programs to help veterans; the remaining 40 percent was overhead. It also reported claims of work environment coercion, and multiple terminations. That same month, CBS News disclosed that the WWP had grown to spend millions of dollars annually on team-building events.

In March 2016, Wounded Warrior Project's board of directors dismissed the charity's top two executives, Steven Nardizzi and Al Giordano, after hiring the law firm Simpson Thacher & Bartlett to perform an independent review of spending issues related to the company's funds. Board chairman Anthony Odierno was announced as temporarily taking control of the charity. And spending on conferences and meetings had increased from just under $2 million in 2010 to $26 million in 2014.

In October 2016, Charity Navigator dropped Wounded Warrior Project from its "watch list", and later boosted the nonprofit's score to a four-star rating (out of four stars).

In February 2017, the Better Business Bureau released a report clearing Wounded Warrior Project of the "lavish spending" allegations, and "found the organization's spending to be consistent with its programs and mission."

In April 2020, WWP donated $10 million to 10,000 of its ill and wounded service members during the COVID pandemic. This was the largest donation WWP had made to its members.

In 2022, MacKenzie Scott donated $15 million to Wounded Warrior Project, its largest individual gift to date.

The WWP reported total revenues in September 2024 of $385,170,098 and total net assets of $453,135,910.

During the federal government shutdown in 2025, the WWP provided a total of $2 million in emergency grants for food and financial assistance to the Armed Services YMCA, Military Family Advisory Network, Hope for the Warriors, Stronghold Food Pantry, Operation Homefront and the Elizabeth Dole Foundation.

== Charity ratings ==
According to a 2013 article in Nonprofit Quarterly, "Depending on the rater, the Wounded Warrior Project seems to have scored low (Charity Watch), high (BBB Wise Giving Alliance) or somewhere in the middle (Charity Navigator)". However, for the fiscal year ended 30 September 2016, Charity Watch assigned WWP a C+ rating (up from a D originally) and Charity Navigator published its rating for WWP on 1 February 2017 as "four out of four stars" (up from three). As of August 2018, that rating had dropped back down to 3 stars. According to Charity Navigator, WWP allocates 71 percent of its revenue to program and service expenses and the remaining balance pays to support those programs. As of 2023, the Wounded Warrior Project scores a 89% at Charity Navigator.

In January 2017, the Better Business Bureau's Wise Giving Alliance renewed its accreditation of WWP, for the next two years, as meeting the 20 standards for charity accountability. In 2024, the WWP was still listed as meeting all 20 BBB Standards for Charity Accountability.

In 2023, Wounded Warrior Project was named one of the NonProfit Times' Best Nonprofits to Work For, ranking 39 among all participating non-profit organizations.

== See also ==
- Warrior Games (multi-sport event)
- Warrior Care Network
- Help for Heroes
