= List of hospitals in Georgia (U.S. state) =

This is a list of hospitals in Georgia, sorted by hospital name. According to the American Hospital Directory, there were 187 hospitals in Georgia in 2020.

== Acute care hospitals ==
Hospital name	City	County	Acute care beds	Trauma center designation	COTH teaching hospital	Year Opened	Affiliation	Notes
AdventHealth Gordon	Calhoun	Gordon	69				AdventHealth	Formerly Gordon Hospital
AdventHealth Murray	Chatsworth	Murray	29				AdventHealth	Formerly Murray Medical Center
AdventHealth Redmond	Rome	Floyd	230	Level III			AdventHealth	Formerly Redmond Regional Medical Center
Archbold - Brooks County Hospital	Quitman	Brooks	25				Archbold	
Archbold - Grady General Hospital	Cairo	Grady	60			1960	Archbold	
Archbold Memorial Hospital	Thomasville	Thomas	264	Level II		1925	Archbold	
Archbold - Mitchell County Hospital	Camilla	Mitchell	25				Archbold	
Atrium Health Navicent Baldwin	Milledgeville	Baldwin	140				Atrium	formerly Oconee Regional Medical Center
Atrium Health Levine Children's Beverly Knight Olson Children’s Hospital	Macon	Bibb	112				Atrium	
Atrium Health Navicent the Medical Center	Macon	Bibb	639	Level I	Yes	1895	Atrium	
Atrium Health Navicent Peach	Byron	Houston, Peach	25			2013	Atrium	New facility opened in 2013; former Fort Valley facility was in operation 1953–2013.
Bleckley Memorial Hospital	Cochran	Bleckley	25				—	
Candler County Hospital	Metter	Candler	25				—	
Candler Hospital	Savannah	Chatham	384			1804	SJCHS	Oldest hospital in Georgia, and second oldest in continuous operation in the U.S.
Chatuge Regional Hospital	Hiawassee	Towns	137				Union Regional	
CHI Memorial Hospital Georgia	Fort Oglethorpe	Catoosa, Walker	36				CHI	Formerly Cornerstone Medical Center, previously Hutcheson Medical Center
Children's Healthcare of Atlanta Arthur M Blank Hospital	Brookhaven	DeKalb	446	Level IV Neonatal Center Level I Peds	Yes	1928	CHOA	
Children's Healthcare of Atlanta Hughes Spalding Hospital	Atlanta	Fulton			Yes	1952	CHOA	
Children's Healthcare of Atlanta Scottish Rite Hospital	Atlanta	Fulton		Level II Peds	Yes	1915	CHOA	
City of Hope, Atlanta	Newnan	Coweta	50			2012		Formerly Cancer Treatment Centers of America
Clinch Memorial Hospital	Homerville	Clinch	25				—	
Coffee Regional Medical Center	Douglas	Coffee	88				—	
Colquitt Regional Medical Center	Moultrie	Colquitt	84				—	
Crisp Regional Hospital	Cordele	Crisp	216				—	
Doctors Hospital of Augusta	Augusta	Richmond	350				HCA	
Dodge County Hospital	Eastman	Dodge	94				—	
Donalsonville Hospital	Donalsonville	Seminole	65			1919	—	
Dorminy Medical Center	Fitzgerald	Ben Hill	75			1974	—	previously Phoebe Dorminy Medical Center
East Georgia Regional Medical Center	Statesboro	Bulloch	150				—	
Effingham Hospital	Springfield	Effingham				1969	—	
Elbert Memorial Hospital	Elberton	Elbert	52				—	
Emanuel Medical Center	Swainsboro	Emanuel	94				—	
Emory Decatur Hospital	Decatur	DeKalb	628			1961	Emory	
Emory Hillandale Hospital	Lithonia	DeKalb	100			2005	Emory	
Emory Johns Creek Hospital	Johns Creek	Fulton	118			2007	Emory	
Emory Saint Joseph's Hospital	Atlanta	Fulton	276			1880	Emory	Formerly Saint Joseph's Hospital of Atlanta
Emory University Hospital	Atlanta	DeKalb	569		Yes		Emory	
Emory University Hospital Midtown	Atlanta	Fulton	511		Yes	1908	Emory	Formerly Crawford W. Long Memorial Hospital
Emory University Orthopaedics & Spine Hospital	Tucker	DeKalb					Emory	
Evans Memorial Hospital	Claxton	Evans	209				—	
Fairview Park Hospital	Dublin	Laurens	190	Level III			HCA	
Fannin Regional Hospital	Blue Ridge	Fannin	50				—	
Flint River Hospital	Montezuma	Macon	49				—	
Floyd Medical Center	Rome	Floyd	278	Level II			Atrium/Floyd	
Floyd Polk Medical Center	Cedartown	Polk	18				Atrium/Floyd	
Grady Memorial Hospital	Atlanta	Fulton, DeKalb,	961	Level I	Yes	1892	—	
Hamilton Medical Center	Dalton	Whitfield	282	Level II		1921	—	
Higgins General Hospital	Bremen	Carroll, Haralson	25				Tanner	
Houston Healthcare - Houston Medical Center	Warner Robins	Houston, Peach	237			1960	Houston Healthcare	Formerly Houston County Hospital
Houston Healthcare - Perry Hospital	Perry	Houston, Peach	45			1969	Houston Healthcare	
Irwin County Hospital	Ocilla	Irwin	34				—	
Jasper Memorial Hospital	Monticello	Jasper	17					
Jeff Davis Hospital	Hazlehurst	Jeff Davis	25				—	
Jefferson Hospital	Louisville	Jefferson	37				—	
Jenkins County Medical Center	Millen	Jenkins	25				—	Formerly Optim Medical Center - Jenkins
Liberty Regional Medical Center	Hinesville	Liberty	25			1961	—	
LifeBrite Community Hospital of Early	Blakely	Early	25				LifeBrite	Formerly Pioneer Community Hospital of Early
Meadows Regional Medical Center	Vidalia	Toombs	122				—	
Memorial Health University Medical Center	Savannah	Chatham	654	Level I	Yes	1955	HCA	
Memorial Hospital and Manor	Bainbridge	Decatur	80/107			1960	—	
Memorial Satilla Health	Waycross	Ware	345				HCA	formerly Mayo Clinic Health System in Waycross, previously Satilla Regional Medical Center
Miller County Hospital	Colquitt	Miller	25			1957	—	
Monroe County Hospital	Forsyth	Monroe	25				Aletheia	
Morgan Medical Center	Madison	Morgan	46	Level IV			—	Formerly Morgan Memorial Hospital
Mountain Lakes Medical Center	Clayton	Rabun					—	
Northeast Georgia Medical Center Barrow	Winder	Barrow	80			1951	NGMC	Formerly Barrow Regional Medical Center
Northeast Georgia Medical Center Braselton	Braselton	Barrow, Gwinnett, Hall, Jackson	100			2015	NGMC	Formerly River Place Braselton
Northeast Georgia Medical Center Gainesville	Gainesville	Hall	557	Level I		1951	NGMC	
Northeast Georgia Medical Center Habersham	Demorest	Habersham	137				—	Formerly Habersham Medical Center
Northeast Georgia Medical Center Lumpkin	Dahlonega	Lumpkin	49				NGMC	facility was previously Chestatee Regional Hospital
Northridge Medical Center	Commerce	Jackson	239				—	
Northside Hospital Atlanta	Atlanta	DeKalb, Fulton	537			1970	Northside	
Northside Hospital Cherokee	Canton	Cherokee	158			1962	Northside	
Northside Hospital Duluth	Duluth	Gwinnett	81			1944	Northside	Formerly Gwinnett Medical Center-Duluth
Northside Hospital Forsyth	Cumming	Forsyth	304				Northside	
Northside Hospital Gwinnett	Lawrenceville	Gwinnett	696	Level II		1959	Northside	formerly Gwinnett Medical Center-Lawrenceville
Optim Medical Center - Screven	Sylvania	Screven					Optim	
Optim Medical Center - Tattnall	Reidsville	Tattnall					Optim	previously Doctors Hospital of Tattnall
Phoebe Putney Memorial Hospital	Albany	Dougherty	420			1911	Phoebe	
Phoebe Putney Memorial Hospital - North Campus	Albany	Dougherty	248			1971	Phoebe	formerly Palmyra Medical Center
Phoebe Sumter Medical Center	Americus	Sumter	76			1952/2011	Phoebe	
Phoebe Worth Medical Center	Sylvester	Worth	25				Phoebe	
Piedmont Athens Regional	Athens	Clarke	350	Level II		1919	Piedmont	Formerly Athens Regional Medical Center
Piedmont Atlanta Hospital	Atlanta	Fulton	643				Piedmont	
Piedmont Augusta	Augusta	Richmond	812			1818	Piedmont Augusta	formerly University Hospital
Piedmont Augusta Summerville Campus	Augusta	Richmond	231			1952	Piedmont Augusta	Formerly Trinity Hospital of Augusta, University Hospital Summerville
Piedmont Cartersville Medical Center	Cartersville	Bartow	119	Level III			Piedmont	
Piedmont Columbus Regional - Midtown	Columbus	Muscogee	583	Level II	Yes	1982	Piedmont	Formerly Midtown Medical Center
Piedmont Columbus Regional - Northside	Columbus	Muscogee	100				Piedmont	Formerly Hughston Hospital
Piedmont Eastside Medical Center	Snellville	Gwinnett	249				Piedmont	Formerly Eastside Medical Center
Piedmont Eastside South Campus	Snellville	Gwinnett	0				Piedmont	No acute care beds at this facility (61-bed inpatient psychiatric center, 20-bed inpatient rehabilitation facility, and an 11-bed emergency department.)
Piedmont Fayette Hospital	Fayetteville	Fayette	300				Piedmont	
Piedmont Henry Hospital	Stockbridge	Henry	277				Piedmont	
Piedmont Macon Hospital	Macon	Bibb	237			1971	Piedmont	formerly Coliseum Medical Center
Piedmont Macon North Hospital	Macon	Bibb	103			1984	Piedmont	formerly Charter Medical Center, Coliseum Northside Hospital
Piedmont McDuffie	Thomson	McDuffie	25				Piedmont Augusta	Formerly McDuffie Regional Medical Center, University Hospital McDuffie
Piedmont Mountainside Hospital	Jasper	Pickens	35				Piedmont	
Piedmont Newnan	Newnan	Coweta	143				Piedmont	
Piedmont Newton	Covington	Newton	97			1954	Piedmont	Joined Piedmont Healthcare October 1, 2015; Formerly Newton Medical Center
Piedmont Rockdale	Conyers	Rockdale	138				Piedmont	formerly Rockdale Medical Center
Piedmont Walton Hospital	Monroe	Walton	135	Level III			Piedmont	formerly Clearview Regional Medical Center
Putnam General Hospital	Eatonton	Putnam	25				Atrium (Managed)	
South Georgia Medical Center	Valdosta	Lowndes	335			1955	SGMC	
South Georgia Medical Center Berrien	Nashville	Berrien	51			1965	SGMC	Formerly Berrien County Hospital
South Georgia Medical Center Lanier	Lakeland	Lanier	25			1950	SGMC	Formerly Louis Smith Memorial Hospital
Southeast Georgia Health System Brunswick	Brunswick	Glynn	316			1866/1955	SGHS	
Southeast Georgia Health System Camden	St. Marys	Camden	40				SGHS	
Southern Regional Medical Center	Riverdale	Clayton	331			1971	—	
Southwell Medical Center	Adel	Cook	60			2019	Southwell	replaced Cook Medical Center
Southwell Tift Regional Medical Center	Tifton	Tift	181			1965	Southwell	
St. Francis Hospital	Columbus	Muscogee	360			1950	Emory	
St. Joseph's Hospital	Savannah	Chatham	330			1875	SJCHS	
St. Mary's Good Samaritan Hospital	Greensboro	Greene	25				St. Mary's	
St. Mary's Hospital	Athens	Clarke	170				St. Mary's	
St. Mary's Sacred Heart Hospital	Lavonia	Franklin, Hart	56				St. Mary's	formerly Ty Cobb Regional Medical Center
Stephens County Hospital	Toccoa	Stephens	96				—	
Tanner Medical Center Carrollton	Carrollton	Carroll	201			1949	Tanner	
Tanner Medical Center Villa Rica	Villa Rica	Carroll, Douglas	80			1955/2003	Tanner	
Taylor Regional Hospital	Hawkinsville	Pulaski	55	Level III		1936	—	
Union General Hospital	Blairsville	Union	45			1959	Union Regional	
Upson Regional Medical Center	Thomaston	Upson	120				—	
Warm Springs Medical Center	Warm Springs	Meriwether	104			1957	—	
Washington County Regional Medical Center	Sandersville	Washington	116			1961	—	
Wayne Memorial Hospital	Jesup	Wayne	115			1896	—	
Wellstar Children's Hospital of Georgia	Augusta	Richmond	154		No		Wellstar	
Wellstar Cobb Medical Center	Austell	Cobb	368			1968	Wellstar	Formerly Cobb General Hospital
Wellstar Douglas Medical Center	Douglasville	Douglas	102			1946	Wellstar	
Wellstar Kennestone Regional Medical Center	Marietta	Cobb	633	Level I		1950	Wellstar	
Wellstar MCG Health Medical Center	Augusta	Richmond	478	Level I	Yes		Wellstar	formerly MCG Health, later Augusta University Medical Center
Wellstar North Fulton Medical Center	Roswell	Fulton	218	Level II		1983	Wellstar	Formerly North Fulton Regional Hospital
Wellstar Paulding Medical Center	Dallas	Paulding	216			1954	Wellstar	
Wellstar Spalding Medical Center	Griffin	Spalding	160				Wellstar	Formerly Spalding Regional Medical Center
Wellstar Sylvan Grove Medical Center	Jackson	Butts	21				Wellstar	
Wellstar West Georgia Medical Center	LaGrange	Troup	542	Level III		1937	Wellstar	
Wills Memorial Hospital	Washington	Wilkes	25			1924	—	

== Long-term and/or rehabilitation hospitals ==
Hospital name	City	County	Hospital beds	Year founded	Notes
Atrium Health Navicent Rehabilitation Hospital	Macon	Bibb		1988	
Columbus Specialty Hospital	Columbus	Muscogee			
Emory Long Term Acute Care	Decatur	DeKalb	49		Formerly DeKalb Medical Long Term Acute Care
Kindred Hospital Atlanta	Atlanta	Fulton			
Landmark Hospital of Athens	Athens	Clarke	42		
Regency Hospital of Central Georgia	Macon	Bibb			
Regency Hospital of South Atlanta	East Point	Fulton			
Roosevelt Warm Springs Institute for Rehabilitation	Warm Springs	Meriwether			
Select Specialty Hospital Atlanta	Atlanta	Fulton			
Select Specialty Hospital Augusta	Augusta	Richmond			
Select Specialty Hospital Savannah	Savannah	Chatham			
Shepherd Center	Atlanta	Fulton			
Southern Crescent Hospital for Specialty Care	Riverdale	Clayton	30		
Triumph the Specialty Hospital Rome	Rome	Floyd	24		
Walton Rehabilitation Hospital	Augusta	Richmond			
Wellstar Windy Hill Hospital	Marietta	Cobb	115	1973	
Wesley Woods Geriatric Hospital	Atlanta	DeKalb			

== Military hospitals ==
Hospital name	Military facility	County	Hospital beds	Year founded	Notes
Dwight D. Eisenhower Army Medical Center	Fort Gordon	Richmond			
Martin Army Community Hospital	Fort Benning	Muscogee			
Winn Army Community Hospital	Fort Stewart	Liberty			

== Psychiatric and/or chemical dependency hospitals ==
Hospital name	City	County	Hospital beds	Year founded	Notes
Anchor Hospital	College Park	Clayton	111		
Central State Hospital	Milledgeville	Baldwin	852	1842	maximum secure forensics facility operated by the DBHDD
Coastal Behavioral Health	Savannah	Chatham	50		
Coastal Harbor Treatment Center	Savannah	Chatham	132		
Coliseum Center for Behavioral Health	Macon	Bibb			
Crescent Pines Hospital	Stockbridge	Henry	50		
East Central Regional Hospital Augusta	Augusta	Richmond			operated by the Department of Behavioral Health and Developmental Disabilities
East Central Regional Hospital Gracewood	Gracewood			1921	operated by the Department of Behavioral Health and Developmental Disabilities
Emory Wesley Woods Hospital	Atlanta	DeKalb	44	1987	
Georgia Regional Hospital Atlanta	Decatur	DeKalb	306	1968	state-funded; operated by the Department of Behavioral Health and Developmental Disabilities
Georgia Regional Hospital Savannah	Savannah	Chatham			state-funded; operated by the Department of Behavioral Health and Developmental Disabilities
Hillside Hospital	Atlanta	Fulton			
Laurel Heights Hospital	Atlanta	Fulton			
Lighthouse Care Center of Augusta	Augusta	Richmond			
Macon Behavioral Health System	Macon	Bibb			
Peachford Hospital	Atlanta	DeKalb	246	1973	
Ridgeview Institute	Smyrna	Cobb			
RiverWoods Behavioral Health System	Riverdale	Clayton	75		
Saint Simons By-The-Sea	Saint Simons Island	Glynn			
SummitRidge Hospital	Lawrenceville	Gwinnett			
Talbott Recovery Atlanta	College Park	Clayton			
Talbott Recovery Columbus	Columbus	Muscogee			
Talbott Recovery Dunwoody	Dunwoody	DeKalb			
Turning Point Hospital	Moultrie	Colquitt	59		
West Central Georgia Regional Hospital	Columbus	Muscogee	194	1974	operated by the Department of Behavioral Health and Developmental Disabilities
Willingway Hospital	Statesboro	Bulloch			
Willowbrooke at Tanner	Villa Rica	Carroll			
Youth Villages Inner Harbour Campus	Douglasville	Douglas			

== Veterans Affairs (VA) medical centers ==
Also see: List of Veterans Affairs medical facilities in Georgia

Hospital name	City	County	Hospital beds	Year founded	Notes
Atlanta VA Medical Center	Decatur	DeKalb			
Carl Vinson VA Medical Center	Dublin	Laurens			
Charlie Norwood VA Medical Center	Augusta	Richmond			

== Closed hospitals ==
Hospital name	City	County	Hospital beds	Trauma designation	Year founded	Year closed	Notes
Calhoun Memorial Hospital	Arlington	Calhoun			1951	2013	
Charlton Memorial Hospital	Folkston	Charlton	25			2013	
Cobb Memorial Hospital	Lavonia	Franklin	71		1950	2012	
Cook Medical Center	Adel	Cook	60		1950	2019	Replaced by Southwell Medical Center
Emory Adventist Hospital	Smyrna	Cobb	73		1974	2014	Closed October 31, 2014
Emory Parkway Hospital	Lithia Springs	Douglas	256		1974	2002	Formerly Atlanta West-Parkway General Hospital
Hancock County Hospital	Sparta	Hancock	52		1968	2001	
Hart County Hospital	Hartwell	Hart	174			2012	Closed in May 2012 to make way for Ty Cobb Memorial
Lower Oconee Community Hospital	Glenwood	Wheeler		Level IV		2014	
North Georgia Medical Center	Ellijay	Gilmer	140			2016	
South Georgia Medical Center Smith Northview	Valdosta	Lowndes	45			2015	Formerly Smith Northview Hospital; converted to outpatient facility
Southwest Atlanta Hospital	Atlanta	Fulton	125		1943	2009	
Southwest Georgia Regional Medical Center	Cuthbert	Randolph	25	—	1947	2020	Critical access hospital; Formerly Patterson Hospital
Stewart Webster Hospital	Richland	Stewart			1950	2013	
Wellstar Atlanta Medical Center	Atlanta	DeKalb, Fulton	460	Level I	1901	2022	Formerly Georgia Baptist Hospital
Wellstar Atlanta Medical Center South	East Point	Fulton	183			2022	Formerly South Fulton Medical Center; facility reopened as an outpatient facility, Wellstar East Point Health Center
West Paces Ferry Hospital	Atlanta	Fulton	294		1967	1999	
Woodstock Hospital	Woodstock	Cherokee	25		1969	1994	
