= Jason Heyward =

American baseball player (born 1989)

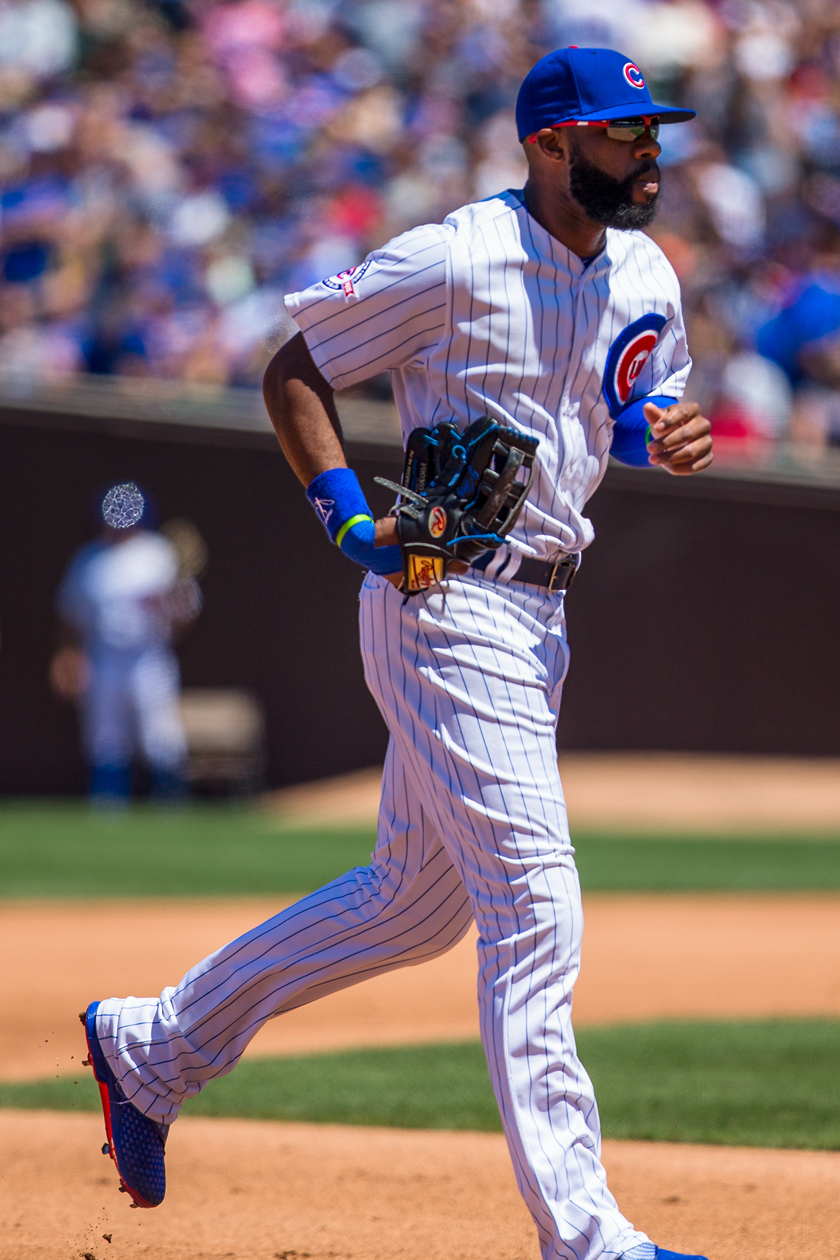
- Heyward with the Chicago Cubs in 2016
- Right fielder
- Born: August 9, 1989 (age 37); Ridgewood, New Jersey, U.S.
- Batted: Left Threw: Left

MLB debut
- April 5, 2010, for the Atlanta Braves

Last MLB appearance
- May 23, 2025, for the San Diego Padres

MLB statistics
- Batting average: .255
- Home runs: 186
- Runs batted in: 730
- Stats at Baseball Reference

Teams
- Atlanta Braves (2010–2014); St. Louis Cardinals (2015); Chicago Cubs (2016–2022); Los Angeles Dodgers (2023–2024); Houston Astros (2024); San Diego Padres (2025)

Career highlights and awards
- All-Star (2010); World Series champion (2016); 5× Gold Glove Award (2012, 2014–2017)

Jason Alias Heyward (born August 9, 1989), nicknamed "J-Hey", is an American former professional baseball right fielder. He played 16 seasons in Major League Baseball (MLB) for the Atlanta Braves, St. Louis Cardinals, Chicago Cubs, Los Angeles Dodgers, Houston Astros, and San Diego Padres.

Originally the Braves' first-round selection in the 2007 MLB draft from Henry County High School in Georgia, Heyward began his minor league career at age 17. He appeared in three minor league all-star games and won two minor league player of the year awards. In 2010, multiple media outlets named Heyward the top prospect in all of baseball.

Heyward debuted in MLB as Atlanta's starting right fielder on Opening Day 2010. He was named to the National League (NL) All-Star team that season and finished second in the NL Rookie of the Year Award voting. While injuries limited his playing time in 2011 and 2013, Heyward enjoyed a breakout season in 2012; that season, he hit 27 home runs, drove in 82 runs, scored 93 runs, and stole 21 bases. Heyward was traded to the Cardinals after the 2014 season. In December 2015, he signed with the Cubs as a free agent; he was a member of the Cubs' World Series-winning 2016 team. Heyward was released by the Cubs in November 2022 and played for the Dodgers in 2023 and 2024.

Standing 6 feet 5 inches (1.96 m) tall and weighing 245 pounds (111 kg), Heyward throws and bats left-handed. He has worn uniform No. 22 through most of his major league career in honor of a high school friend and teammate who died in a traffic collision. Heyward has been widely regarded as one of the best outfield defenders in MLB. He won both the Fielding Bible and the NL Gold Glove Awards for right fielders in 2012, 2014, 2015, 2016 and 2017, and he received Wilson's MLB Defensive Player of the Year in 2014.

== Early life ==
The son of Dartmouth graduates, Jason Heyward was born on August 9, 1989, in Ridgewood, New Jersey. His father, Eugene, is from Beaufort, South Carolina, and his mother, Laura, is from New York City; they met at Dartmouth. Eugene played basketball and majored in engineering and Laura studied French. Eugene's uncle, Kenny Washington, played basketball for two John Wooden-led NCAA championship UCLA teams in 1964 and 1965. Jason has one younger brother, Jacob (b. 1995), who attended the University of Miami and played baseball for the Hurricanes. Jacob was drafted by the San Francisco Giants in 2016.

The Heywards moved to the Atlanta metropolitan area soon after he was born. Jason played and showed marked ability in baseball from an early age. Before he turned 10, he played for a national championship. Eugene helped fuel both of his sons' passion for baseball. He dedicated himself to driving them to every tournament and competition possible in the family Chevrolet Suburban, which racked up hundreds of thousands of miles between the events and his 90-minute work commute to and from Robins Air Force Base to the south in Houston County.

While his father emphasized that working hard and approaching the game with discipline were important, he also stressed that baseball was to be, above all else, fun. Heyward has maintained this same approach throughout his youth and professional career. One tournament in which he played was the renowned East Cobb Baseball program, where he was a standout and has produced other major league players. Heyward attended Henry County High School in McDonough near Atlanta. Heyward briefly played basketball in his youth but concentrated exclusively on baseball in high school at his father's urging. In February 2010, an Associated Press reporter learned from a varsity coach that Heyward's early batting practice exploits proved fatal to an oak tree in deep center field at the high school playing field.

Facing off against future Major League Baseball (MLB) catcher Buster Posey of Lee County High in the Georgia Class AAAA baseball championship during Heyward's sophomore year, Henry County won two of the best-of-three series. Posey was actually the starting pitcher in the first game as Henry Country prevailed, 2–1. Heyward hit a game-tying 400 ft (120 m) home run in Game 2 to cap an eight-run comeback, but Lee County prevailed 14–10. The next game, Heyward's three-run single was the game and series winner in a 16–14 outcome. During his junior season, he again helped lead the Henry County High Warhawks to the state championship. As a senior, he batted .520 with eight home runs (HR) and 29 runs batted in (RBIs).

One of Heyward's close friends and teammates from the 2005 AAAA Georgia state championship team, Andrew Wilmot, died in a traffic collision while attending college. Wilmot was a catcher who wore the uniform number 22, the number Heyward would later wear in his major league career to honor him. Wilmot's mother, Tammie Ruston, was Heyward's high school literature teacher in his senior year.

Numerous colleges showed interest and recruited Heyward, including UCLA, which offered a full-ride scholarship due in part to the family connection. Heyward was also especially interested in Clemson and Georgia Tech. Concurrently, the hometown Atlanta Braves had followed and scouted him for years, while attempting to conceal their excitement.

== Professional career ==
=== Draft and minor leagues ===
Heyward was the 14th overall selection by Atlanta in the 2007 Major League Baseball draft. Despite signing a National Letter of Intent with UCLA, he chose professional baseball over college and signed a contract with the team worth $1.7 million.

At age 17, Heyward began his professional career in Minor League Baseball in the Braves' system. He played for both the Gulf Coast League Braves and the Danville Braves of the Appalachian League in 2007. He homered in his first professional game. In 12 minor league contests in 2007, he batted .302 with one home run and six RBIs. In 2007, Baseball America selected Heyward as the Braves' top overall prospect and the organization's best power hitter; it cited Heyward as having the best strike zone discipline and excelling at multiple other skills.

Heyward split the 2008 season between Single-A Rome of the South Atlantic League (SAL) and High-A Myrtle Beach of the Carolina League. He was named the club's Player of the Month in April. While playing for Rome, Heyward had 42 multi-hit games, including two four-hit games. He finished in the top three in nine offensive categories for the club.

The Braves promoted Heyward to Myrtle Beach on August 25, 2008. He played seven games there. Following the 2008 season, Baseball America named Heyward the South Atlantic League's Most Outstanding Prospect, Top Batting Prospect, and Most Exciting Player. He was also a Baseball America All-Star for the entire minor leagues, Mid- and Post-Season All-Star, Low-Class A All-Star, and the Braves' second-best prospect. MLB.com named him the third-best overall minor league prospect. ESPN.com named him the minor leagues' best corner outfield prospect, the #1 Atlanta prospect, and third-overall minor-league prospect.

Heyward started the 2009 season at Myrtle Beach and then gained successive promotions to Double-A Mississippi and Triple-A Gwinnett. He was named the Carolina League Player of the Week on May 18. Heyward was selected to the Carolina League All-Star team but missed the game due to an oblique injury. He participated in the All-Star Futures Game at Busch Stadium. On July 4, the Braves promoted Heyward to Mississippi, where he was named the team's Player of the Month. From September 5–7, he appeared with the Gwinnett Braves of the Triple-A of the International League. He also played four games with the Peoria Saguaros of the Arizona Fall League (AFL). That September, both Baseball America and USA Today named Heyward their Minor League Player of the Year. He won the Braves' Hank Aaron Award (not to be confused with MLB's Hank Aaron Award), conferred annually to the top offensive player in the Braves organization.

Entering the 2010 season, Baseball America, Keith Law of ESPN.com and Jonathan Mayo of MLB.com each listed Heyward as baseball's top prospect; BA ranked him ahead of Stephen Strasburg and Giancarlo Stanton. The Braves added Heyward to their 40-man roster before the 2010 season began.

=== Atlanta Braves (2010–2014) ===
==== 2010 ====
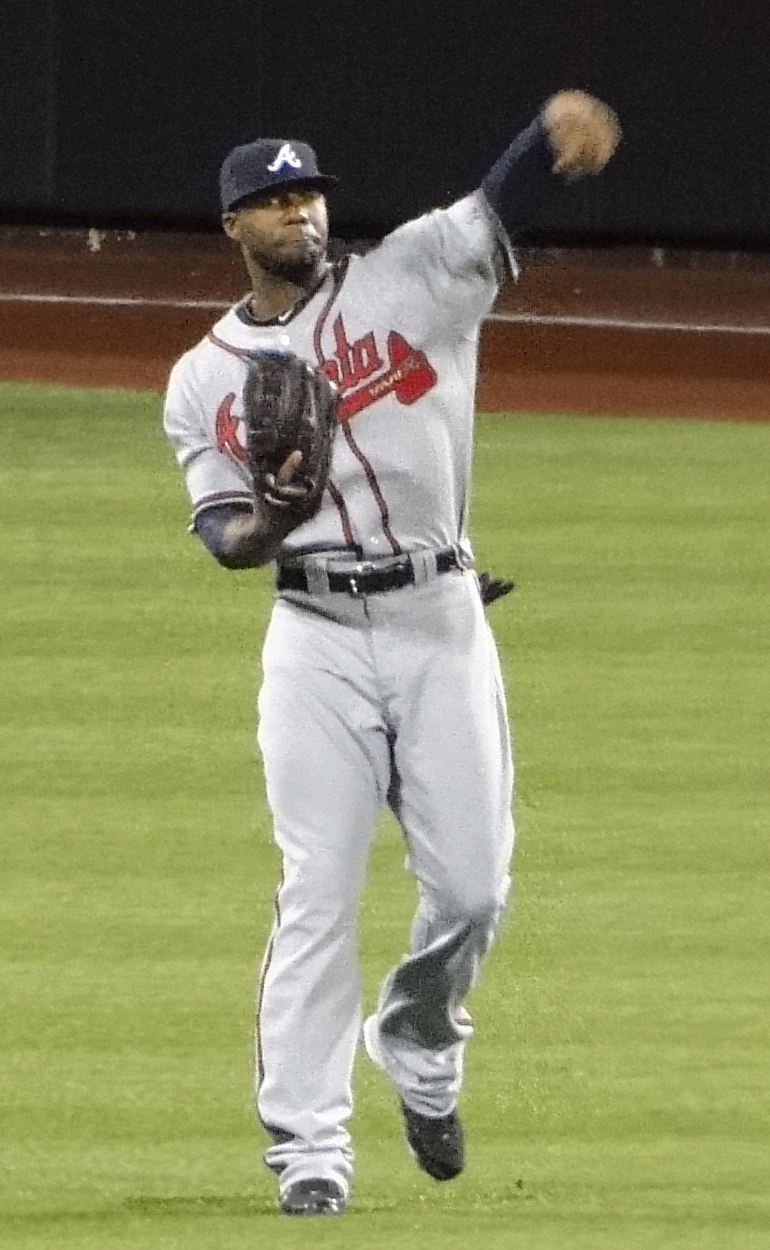
Heyward throwing the ball at Citi Field in 2010

After Heyward made a rapid ascent through the minor leagues, the Braves invited him to spring training in March 2010. There, his hitting continued to draw notice; he routinely hit "rockets" all over the field and over the fences, compelling manager Bobby Cox to make him a regular in the lineup. Cox mentioned that the balls Heyward hit made a different, more pronounced sound than the balls hit by other players. Heyward hit two notable batting practice home runs at the Champion Stadium training complex in Lake Buena Vista, Florida. One damaged a Coca-Cola truck in the parking lot, and another broke the sunroof of Atlanta Braves' assistant general manager Bruce Manno's car. He was initially issued uniform number 71. At the end of spring training, he asked for and received number 22, which he wore in memory of his deceased high school teammate, Andrew Wilmot.

Heyward was one of the most anticipated prospects in all of baseball. Shirts depicting his nickname, "The J-Hey Kid," were in high demand before he even played his first official major league game. Fans and pundits prognosticated on a future Hall of Fame career, comparing Heyward to former greats such as Darryl Strawberry, Willie McCovey and Willie Mays, among many others. In fact, the "J-Hey Kid" nickname was drawn from Mays' nickname, "The Say Hey Kid." On March 26, after Heyward led the club in on-base percentage and slugging percentage in spring training, the Braves named him their starting right fielder.

During his first MLB plate appearance – and on his first swing at an MLB pitch – Heyward hit a three-run home run, estimated at 471 feet (144 m), off of starter Carlos Zambrano. Heyward became the fifth player in Braves history to hit a home run in his first major league at-bat and the 11th in franchise history to do so in his MLB debut.

Through Atlanta's first 50 games, Heyward lived up to the hype that surrounded him, hitting 10 home runs while batting .301 with a .421 OBP and .596 slugging percentage. He was named the National League (NL) Rookie of the Month in both April and May. However, after sustaining a thumb injury while sliding in May, Heyward missed playing time. After he returned later in the season, his performance declined and consistency was elusive. He was selected as a starter for the NL All-Star team, but did not participate due to his thumb injury.

Heyward stole home in a double steal against the Washington Nationals in the first inning on July 28. In so doing, he became the first Brave to steal home since Rafael Furcal, who had done so more than ten years earlier. A 16–5 victory over the Cubs on August 22 featured Heyward's first MLB multi-home run game, as well as career highs in hits and runs scored with four each. In the final 112 games of the season, Heyward batted .266 with a .381 OBP and .396 SLG.

Heyward made his postseason debut on October 7, 2010, in the National League Division Series (NLDS) against the San Francisco Giants. San Francisco eliminated Atlanta, and Heyward had just two hits in the entire series.

Heyward finished his first major league season with a .277 batting average, a .393 on-base percentage, 18 home runs, and 83 runs scored in 142 regular season games. He ranked fourth overall in the NL in OBP and walks. Heyward was named the Sporting News NL Rookie of the Year, the Baseball America MLB Rookie of the Year; he was also named to the Baseball America All-Rookie Team and to Topps' Major League Rookie All-Star Team. He finished second in the voting for the NL Rookie of the Year award.

==== 2011 ====
Heyward's second MLB season commenced in a fashion that reprised the high expectations from his rookie season, but injuries ultimately led to a lengthy and dramatic slump. In the spring, Heyward was diagnosed with a degenerative condition in his lower back. He hit a home run off of Nationals pitcher Liván Hernández in his first at-bat of the season on March 31. He became just the second MLB player, after Kazuo Matsui, to homer in his first major league at-bat on Opening Day and to hit a home run in his first at-bat of the following season. In a back-and-forth game with the Giants on April 24, he hit a go-ahead home run off relief pitcher Jeremy Affeldt in a 9–6, ten-inning victory.

Having previously been represented by Victor Menocal from Career Sports Entertainment (CSE) until Menocal resigned from CSE, news emerged on May 6 that Heyward had made Casey Close his new agent.

From the beginning of spring training, Heyward endured lingering shoulder soreness. After Heyward collected just four hits in his first 41 at-bats in May, the Braves performed a magnetic resonance imaging (MRI) scan on May 12 which revealed an inflamed rotator cuff, but no structural damage. He rested and received a cortisone injection, but aggravated the injury days later during batting practice. The Braves placed him on the disabled list (DL) on May 22. The following month, teammate Chipper Jones publicly criticized Heyward for not playing through his injuries; Jones said, "I think where Jason might have erred was the comment that he made, 'I'm not coming back until it doesn't hurt anymore.' ... What Jason needs to realize is that Jason at 80 percent is a force, and Jason at 80 percent is better than a lot of people in this league". Jones later explained that he reassured Heyward in a phone call that he did not intend to misrepresent Heyward's efforts to rehabilitate.

Upon his return from the DL, Heyward experienced difficulty driving the ball. A sixth-inning home run against the Baltimore Orioles on July 1 was Heyward's first since April 29 against the St. Louis Cardinals, a span of 104 at-bats. During a game against the Chicago Cubs on August 23, Heyward hit his first career grand slam.

Through the end of August, the Braves were the NL wild card leader. However, the Cardinals overcame a 10 1/2-game deficit for the wild card position by winning 20 of their final 28 games, eliminating the Braves from the playoffs on the final day of the season. The Braves' failure to make the playoffs was one of the epic late-season collapses in MLB history. Heyward's overall performance dropped off from his performance during his rookie season. His batting average dropped 50 points to .227; his other contributions, also in decline, included 14 home runs and 42 RBIs in 128 games.

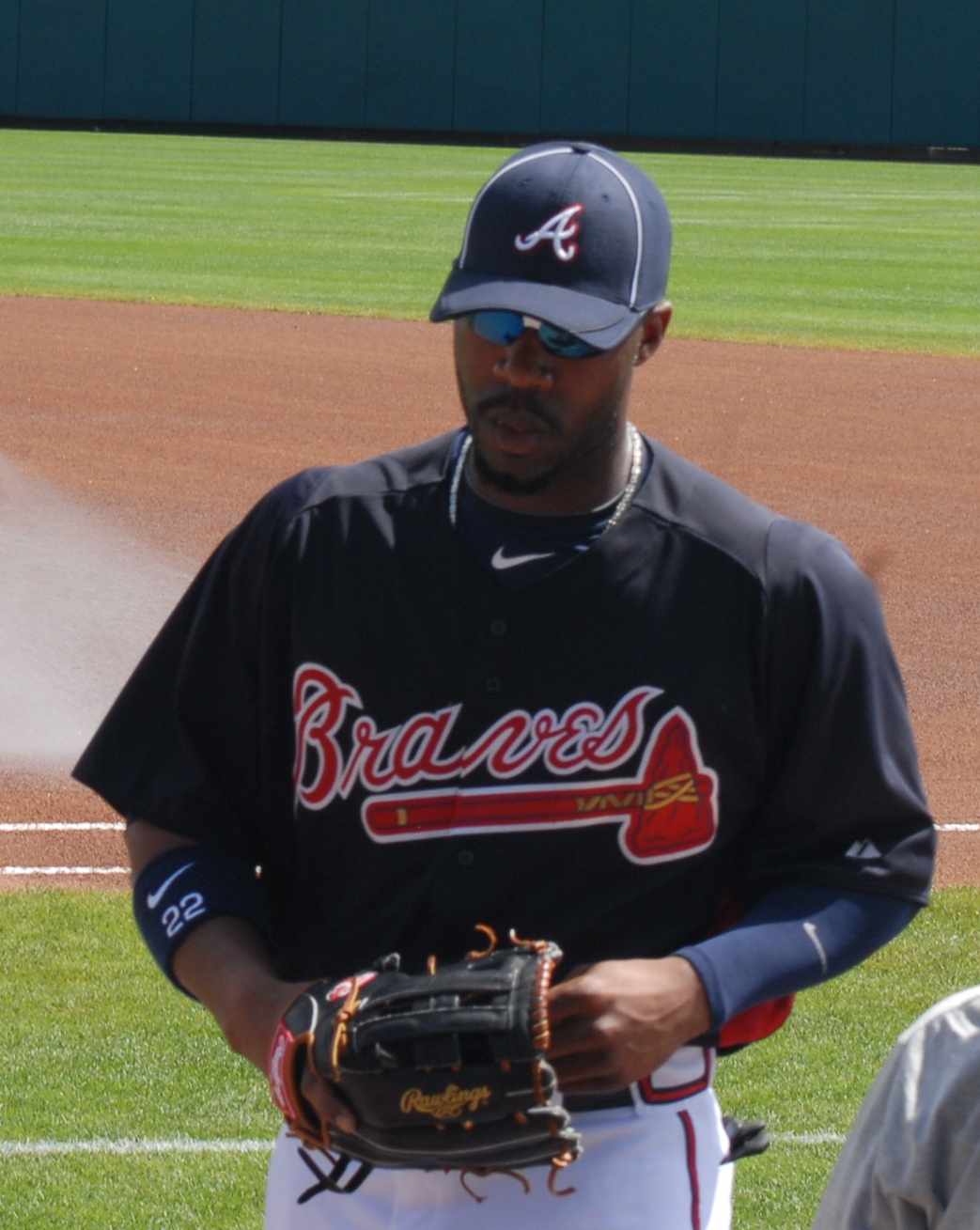
Heyward entering the dugout before a spring training game in 2011

==== 2012 ====
In an effort to improve his performance, Heyward took extra steps in his preseason preparation. He streamlined his swing to mitigate bad habits incorporated after the shoulder injury. He modified his diet to include more fruits, chicken, and fish. Further, he participated in physical therapy to strengthen the shoulder and worked for a leaner weight, dropping from 256 pounds (116 kg) to 235 pounds (107 kg). He started the 2012 season slowly. However, his bases-loaded double on May 13 off Lance Lynn drove in the game-winning run as the Braves triumphed over the Cardinals, 7–4.

On June 7, Heyward's first multi-HR game of the season (and the second of his career) helped secure an 8–2 victory over the Marlins. On June 19, he threw the New York Yankees' Mark Teixeira out at home plate, preserving a 4–3 win. In a 12-game hitting streak that spanned from June 13 to 27, Heyward batted .455 (20-for-44) and homered four times.

After the season, Heyward captured his first career defensive awards: an MLB Fielding Bible Award and a National League Rawlings Gold Glove Award. In 158 games, he batted .269 with career highs of 27 home runs, 82 RBIs, and 21 stolen bases.

==== 2013 ====
On January 18, 2013, the Braves avoided salary arbitration with Heyward by signing him to a one-year, $3.65 million deal. The Braves' outfield also included newly acquired brothers Justin and B. J. Upton, with whom Heyward would play for the remainder of his Braves tenure. An appendectomy on April 22 led to Heyward being placed on the 15-day disabled list. He returned from the appendectomy on May 17, going 2-for-4 in an 8–5 win against the Dodgers.

New York Mets pitcher Jon Niese hit Heyward in the face with a pitch on August 21, fracturing his jaw in two places. He had surgery, which required the insertion of two plates, and returned on September 20. Heyward began wearing a protective shield attached to the right side of his batting helmet. He struck out and walked in a 9–5 win against the Chicago Cubs. Six days later, Heyward set career highs against Philadelphia with five hits and four extra-base hits. After two stints on the DL, Heyward appeared in 104 total games, batting .254 with 14 home runs, 38 RBI, and 67 runs scored. The Braves' record was 71–33 in the games in which he appeared.

==== 2014 ====
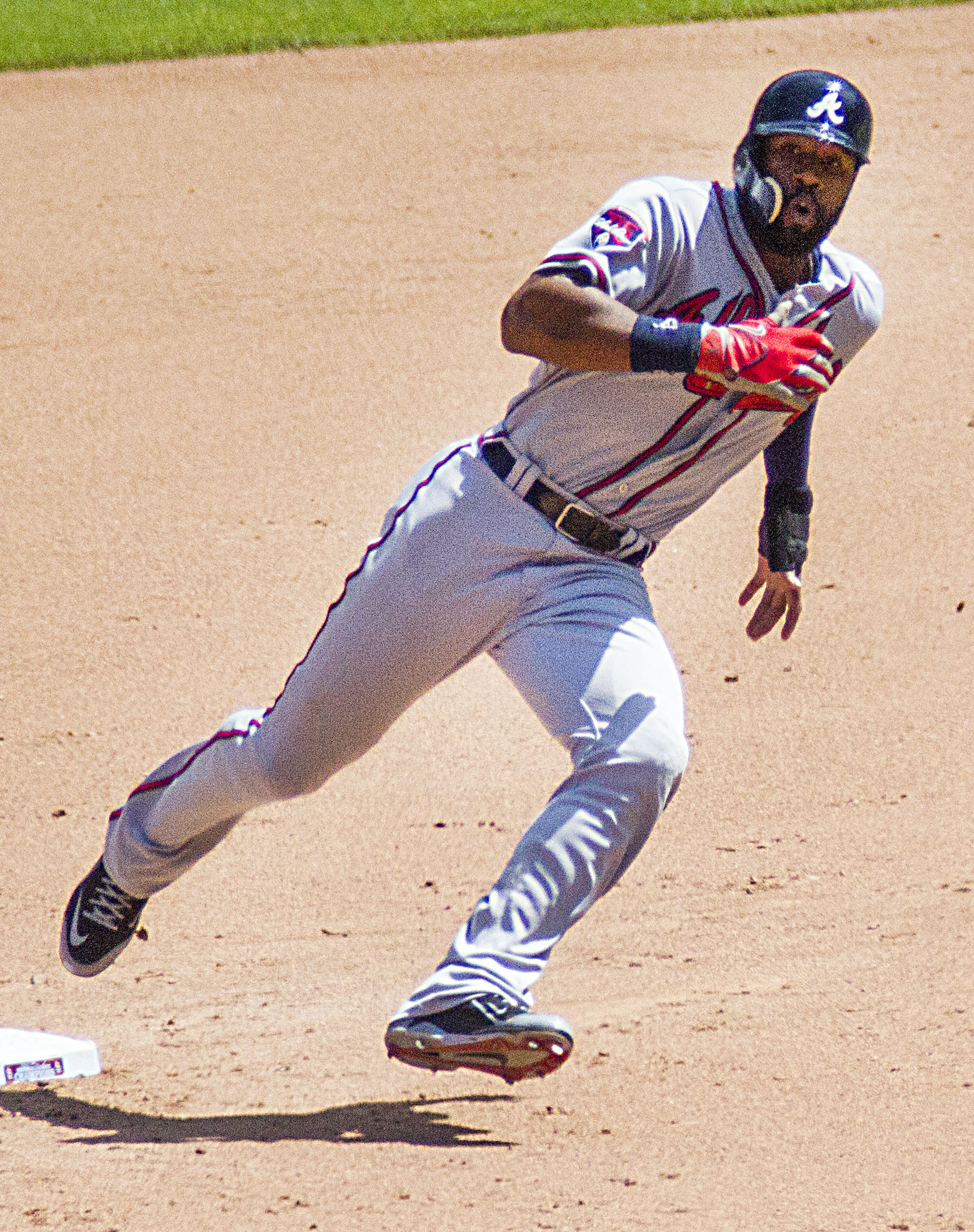
Heyward running the bases in 2014

The Braves bought out Heyward's last arbitration-eligible years on February 4, 2014, agreeing on a two-year, $13.3 million contract. Already rated one of the top defensive outfielders in the league, Heyward significantly improved his coverage in right field during the early part of the season. Two catches on balls hit by star Mike Trout – one on a sinking line drive and one on a ball Heyward leaped to catch at the warning track – helped ensure a 7–3 victory over the Los Angeles Angels of Anaheim on June 15.

Playing as the Braves' primary leadoff hitter, Heyward played in 149 games and finished with a .271 batting average, 74 runs scored, 11 home runs, 58 RBI and 20 stolen bases. Heyward was the recipient of several awards, including his second of both the Rawlings NL Gold Glove Award and the Fielding Bible Award for all MLB right fielders; he won the latter award unanimously. Wilson Sporting Goods named him their MLB right field Defensive Player of the Year and their overall MLB Defensive Player of the Year.

=== St. Louis Cardinals (2015) ===
On November 17, 2014, the Braves traded Heyward to the St. Louis Cardinals along with pitcher Jordan Walden for pitchers Shelby Miller and Tyrell Jenkins to replace their former right fielder and top prospect Oscar Taveras, who died in a car accident a month earlier. Cardinals manager Mike Matheny, who wore uniform #22 and had also done so for most of his playing career, gave his number to Heyward; Heyward wears this number to honor his late friend and teammate Andrew Wilmot.

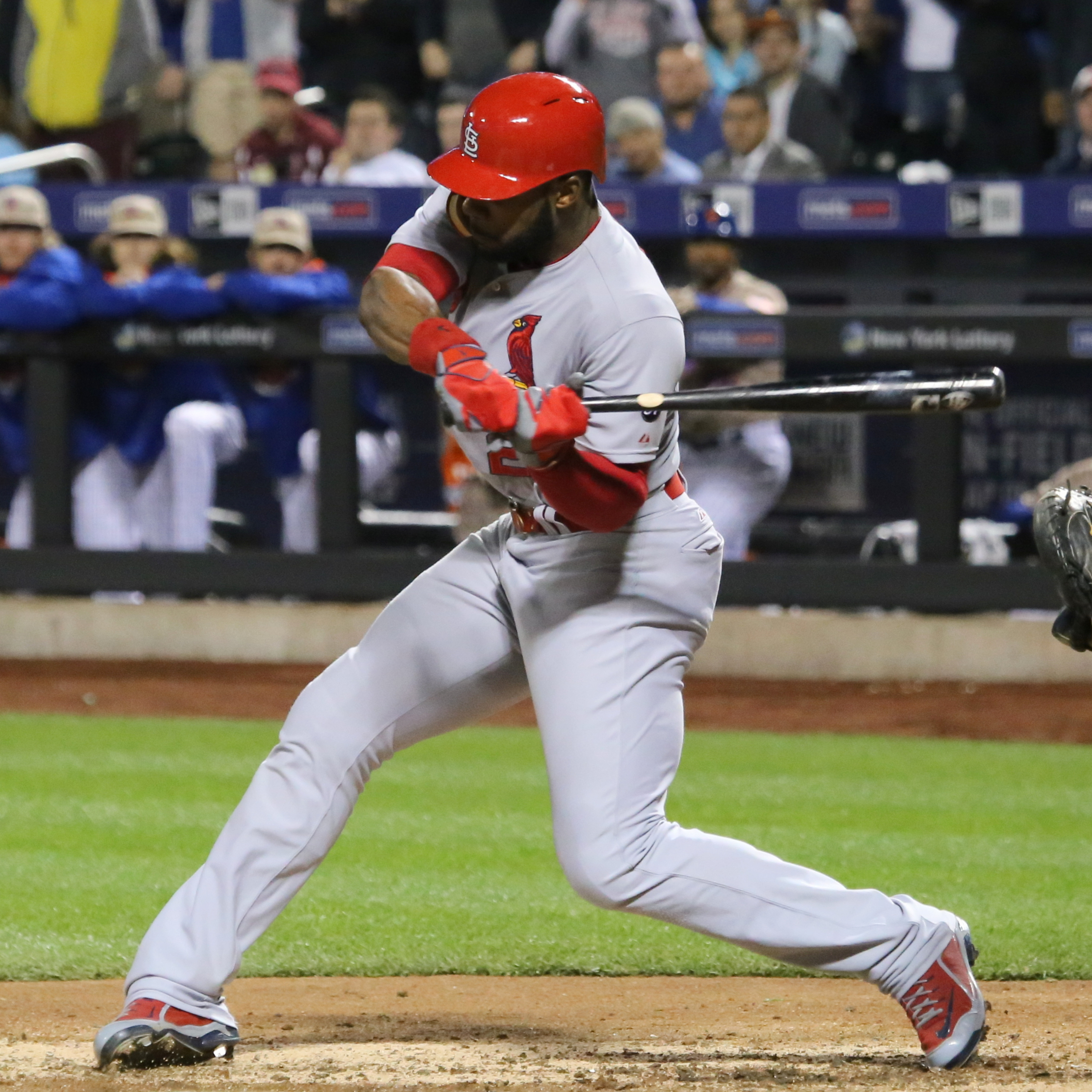
Heyward batting for the St. Louis Cardinals in 2015

On April 5, 2015, five years to the day after his MLB debut, Heyward appeared in his first game as a Cardinal. He garnered three hits, including two doubles and a stolen base in a 3–0 victory over the Chicago Cubs. Heyward homered in three straight games from June 22 to 24. On July 18 against the Mets, he matched a career high with five hits in a 12–2 win.

In an August 16 contest against the Marlins, Heyward hit two home runs for his first multi-home run game with the Cardinals. In the second game of a doubleheader against Pittsburgh on September 30, Heyward hit his second career grand slam in an 11–1 win, giving the Cardinals their 100th victory of the season while clinching their third consecutive National League Central division title. He also robbed both Francisco Cervelli and Michael Morse of hits in that game.

Heyward finished the season with a career-high .293 batting average, a .359 on-base percentage, and a .439 slugging percentage. Among all outfielders since 2010, Heyward's 96.2 accumulated ultimate zone rating (UZR) led the major leagues. The Cardinals lost the National League Division Series to the Chicago Cubs, three games to one. After becoming a free agent for the first time in his career, Heyward won his third Fielding Bible Award and his third Gold Glove.

=== Chicago Cubs (2016–2022) ===
==== 2016 ====
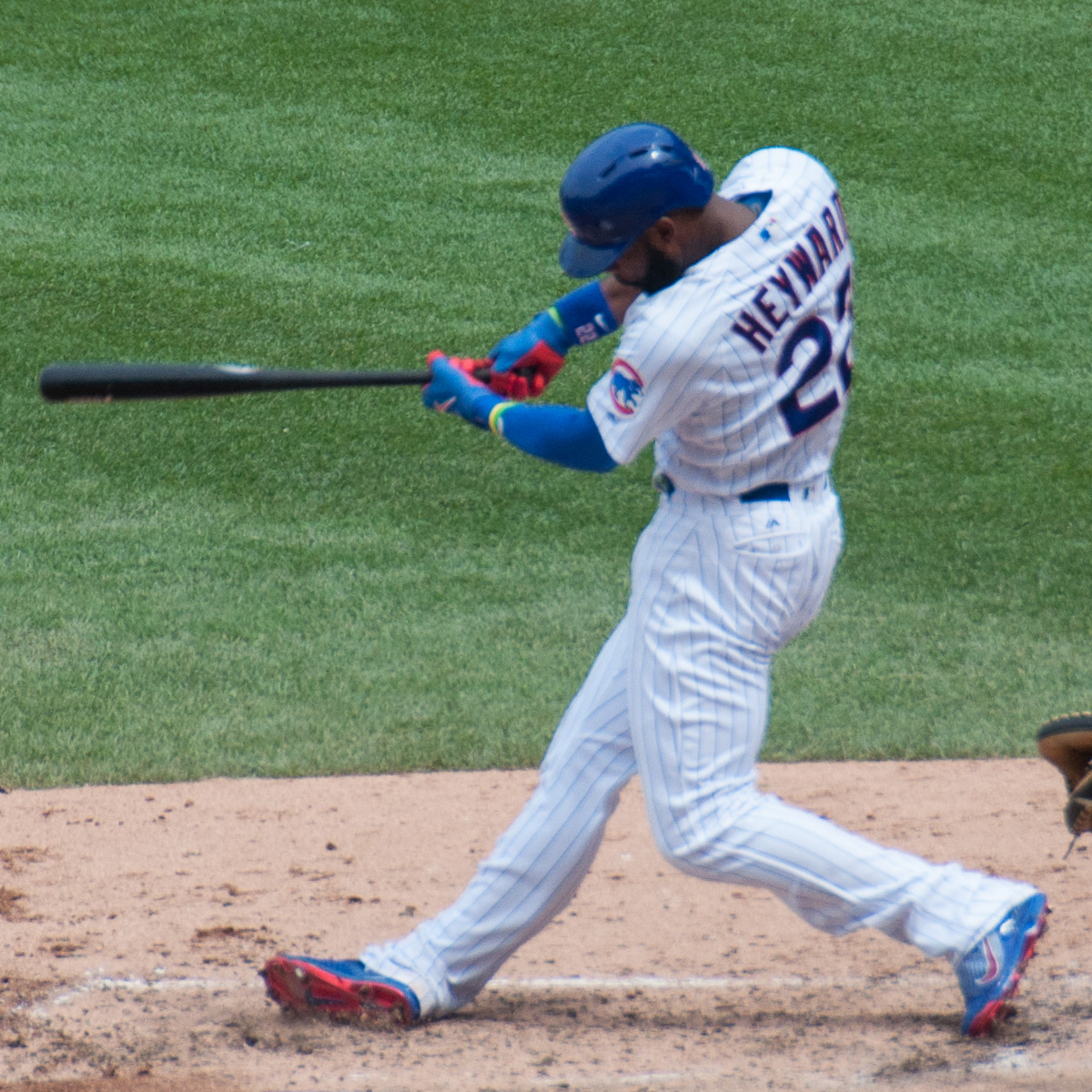
Heyward batting for the Chicago Cubs in 2016

On December 15, 2015, Heyward signed an eight-year, $184 million contract with the Cubs. At the time of Heyward's signing, the contract was the largest player contract that had ever been signed by the Cubs. During his tenure with the Cubs, Heyward's play did not reach the expectations created by his contract.

One of Heyward's first acts after signing his contract was to pay for hotel suites large enough to accommodate teammate David Ross, his wife, and their three young children on all of the Cubs' road trips during the 2016 season. Ross, set to retire after the 2016 season, had been Heyward's teammate during his first three seasons in Atlanta, and Heyward considered him a key mentor in his early MLB career. In an interview with Bleacher Report, Heyward said,

I know how special it is to have teammates like he was my first three years in Atlanta. You don't take it for granted. I wanted to say thank you from the bottom of my heart, as a teammate and as a friend, for what he's done for me.

Heyward struggled in his first season with the Cubs in 2016, batting only .230 with 7 home runs and 49 RBIs; however, he did win his fourth Gold Glove that season.

In Game Four of the 2016 National League Division Series against the San Francisco Giants, with the Cubs holding a 2–1 series lead, Heyward reached on a bunt force out. He then moved to second on an errant throw and scored the go-ahead run on a Javier Baez single, sending the Cubs to the 2016 National League Championship Series.

On October 25, 2016, Heyward, along with teammates Dexter Fowler, Addison Russell, and Carl Edwards Jr., became the first African-Americans to play for the Cubs in a World Series game. Heyward was credited with leading an inspiring players-only meeting during a 17-minute rain delay near the end of Game 7 of the 2016 World Series. The Cubs eventually won the game 8–7 after 10 innings, which gave the franchise its first World Series championship in 108 years. Heyward hit .104 during the 2016 playoffs. On November 9, Heyward became the first position player in Major League Baseball history to win three straight Gold Glove Awards with three different teams (Braves, Cardinals, and Cubs).

==== 2017 ====
On May 8, 2017, Heyward went on the 10-day disabled list due to a sprained finger he suffered in a game against the Yankees three days prior. In late June, Heyward suffered a left-hand laceration while catching a foul ball in Pittsburgh and was unavailable to play in the next series of games.

Heyward chose "J-Hey" as his nickname for the Players Weekend during the 2017 season. For the season, Heyward hit .259 with 11 home runs and 59 RBIs.

==== 2018 ====
On May 8, 2018, Heyward again went on the disabled list due to concussion protocols after attempting a game-saving catch of a home run by William Fowler in the 14th inning. On June 6, Heyward hit a walk-off grand slam home run with two outs in the bottom of the ninth inning to give the Cubs a 7–5 win over the Philadelphia Phillies. At the All-Star break, Heyward had a .285 batting average with 78 hits in 274 plate appearances with six home runs and 41 RBIs, a .344 OBP and a .431 SLG. Heyward ended the season with a .270 batting average, eight home runs, and 57 RBIs.

==== 2019 ====
Heyward had a quality start to the season. He hit two home runs and stole two bases against the Milwaukee Brewers on April 6, becoming only the 18th player—and first Cub—to have a multi-homer, multi-steal game since 1901. It was also his first multi-homer game as a Cub. On April 24, he hit a dramatic three-run home run late in the game to regain the lead in a 7–6 victory against the Los Angeles Dodgers. On May 8, Heyward hit a walk-off, solo home run against the Miami Marlins in the 11th inning, giving the Cubs a 3–2 win. This was Heyward's third walk-off hit and second walk-off home run as a Cub. With that hit, he snapped a 1-for-20 slump. For the season, Heyward hit .251 with 21 home runs and 62 RBIs.

==== 2020 ====
In the pandemic-shortened 2020 season, Heyward batted .265/.392/.456 with six home runs and 22 RBIs in 50 games.

==== 2021 ====
In 2021, Heyward slashed .214/.280/.347 with eight home runs and 30 RBIs in 104 games.

==== 2022 ====
On May 8, 2022, Heyward was placed on the injured list with a left quadriceps strain. He returned to the IL in late June. He remained on the injured list through August. In August, Cubs general manager Jed Hoyer stated that the team would release Heyward at the end of the season. In 48 games for the Cubs, Heyward batted .204/.278/.277 with one home run and 10 RBI. He was officially released by Chicago on November 14, 2022, despite the fact that the Cubs still owed him a salary of $22 million for the 2023 season.

During his seven-year stint with the Cubs, Heyward batted .245, hitting 62 home runs in 2,522 plate appearances. In December 2022, The Sporting News included Heyward's eight-year, $184 million contract with the Cubs on its list of the top 15 worst MLB free-agent contracts of all time.

=== Los Angeles Dodgers (2023–2024) ===
On December 8, 2022, Heyward signed a minor league contract with the Los Angeles Dodgers that included an invitation to major league spring training. He made the Dodgers' Opening Day roster, reworked his swing, accepted a platoon role, and enjoyed a resurgent season. Heyward played in 124 games, batting .269 with 15 homers and 40 RBI. Following the season, Heyward received the Roy Campanella Award, an award that is given by Dodgers players and coaches to the most inspirational Dodger on the team.

On December 6, 2023, Heyward signed a one-year, $9 million contract to return to the Dodgers. In 63 games for them in 2024, he batted .208 with six home runs and 28 RBI. He was designated for assignment on August 22, two days after he hit a pinch-hit go-ahead three-run home run in his final at-bat for the Dodgers. The Dodgers released him on August 26.

=== Houston Astros (2024) ===
On August 29, 2024, Heyward signed a one-year, major league contract with the Houston Astros. During his debut as an Astro, Heyward hit a key two-run double that spearheaded a 6–3 win versus the Kansas City Royals.

On September 24, 2024, the Astros clinched their fourth straight American League (AL) West Division title with a 4–3 win over the Seattle Mariners. Heyward made a jumping catch into the scoreboard to take away a hit in the top of the fifth inning and hit a two-run home run in the bottom half of the inning to give the Astros a lead they would not relinquish. As a member of the Astros, Heyward appeared in 24 games, batting .218/.283/.473 in 61 plate appearances, 2 doubles, 4 home runs, 9 RBI, and 1 stolen base. He played 16 games in right field, 8 in left field, and 2 in center field. Heyward appeared in both games of, and was 0-for-3 in, the American League Wild Card Series (ALWCS), which was swept by the Detroit Tigers. Following the season, he elected free agency.

=== San Diego Padres ===
On February 11, 2025, Heyward signed a one-year, $1 million contract with the San Diego Padres. In 34 appearances for the Padres, he batted .176/.223/.271 with two home runs and 12 RBI. On June 21, Heyward was designated for assignment by San Diego. He was released by the team on June 24.

On March 27, 2026, Heyward announced his retirement from professional baseball.

== Post-playing career ==
On May 13, 2026, the Los Angeles Dodgers hired Heyward to serve as a special assistant in the team's front office.

== Awards ==
Awards
Award/Honor	# of Times	Dates	Refs
Major Leagues
Baseball America Major League Rookie of the Year	1	2010	
Fielding Bible Award at right field	3	2012, 2014, 2015	
Major League Baseball All-Star	1	2010	
National League Player of the Week	1	June 24, 2012	
National League Rawlings Gold Glove at right field	5	2012, 2014, 2015, 2016. 2017	
National League Rookie of the Month	2	April & May 2010	
Sporting News National League Rookie of the Year	1	2010	
Wilson MLB Defensive Player of the Year at right field	1	2014	
Wilson MLB Overall Defensive Player of the Year	1	2014	
Minor Leagues
Baseball America Atlanta Braves Organization Best Tools: Best Defensive OF	1	2009	
Baseball America Atlanta Braves Organization Best Tools: Best Hitter for Average	2	2008–09	
Baseball America Atlanta Braves Organization Best Tools: Best OF Arm	1	2009	
Baseball America Atlanta Braves Organization Best Tools: Best Power	1	2007	
Baseball America Atlanta Braves Organization Best Tools: Best Strike Zone Discipline	3	2007–09	
Baseball America Minor League Player of the Year	1	2009	
Carolina League Player of the Week	1	May 18, 2009	
Major League Baseball All-Star Futures Game	1	2009	
Minor League Baseball All-Star	3	2008 South Atlantic League mid-season 2008 South Atlantic League post-season 2009 Carolina League	
South Atlantic League Most Outstanding Major League Prospect	1	2008	
USA Today Minor League Player of the Year	1	2009	

== Personal life ==
In September 2012, Piedmont Henry Hospital in Stockbridge, Georgia, selected Heyward as one of ten representatives for their Real Men Wear Pink campaign against breast cancer. He stated at the time that one of his grandmothers was battling the condition but had improved and that her battle was an inspiration for him to participate.

Heyward's brother, Jacob, is a coach in the San Francisco Giants organization. Jacob Heyward was drafted by the Atlanta Braves out of high school in the 2013 MLB draft and by the Giants in the 2016 MLB draft.

He is married to Vedrana. Their son was born in March 2022. They own a $5.9 million mansion in the Gold Coast neighborhood of Chicago.

== See also ==
- Chicago Cubs award winners and league leaders
- List of Atlanta Braves award winners and league leaders
- List of largest sports contracts
- List of Major League Baseball career double plays as a right fielder leaders
- List of Major League Baseball career games played as a right fielder leaders
- List of Major League Baseball career putouts as a right fielder leaders
- List of Major League Baseball players with a home run in their first major league at bat
- St. Louis Cardinals award winners and league leaders

Preceded by J. A. Happ	Sporting News NL Rookie of the Year; 2010	Succeeded by Craig Kimbrel
