= Piedmont Athens Regional =

Coordinates: 33.961°N 83.399°W

- Piedmont Healthcare

Geography
- Location: 1199 Prince Avenue, Athens, Georgia, United States

Organization
- Type: Hospital
- Affiliated university: AU-UGA Medical Partnership

Services
- Emergency department: Level II Trauma Center
- Beds: 427

History
- Founded: 1919

Links
- Website: https://www.piedmont.org/locations/piedmont-athens
- Lists: Hospitals in Georgia

Piedmont Athens Regional Medical Center (formerly known as Athens Regional Medical Center) is a hospital in Athens, Georgia. The hospital has 427 beds, a trauma center, and a neonatal intensive care unit. The hospital was founded in 1919 and became part of the Piedmont Healthcare system in 2016. As of 2025, the hospital had a gross patient revenue of $3.8 billion.

In 2015, the president and CEO of the hospital resigned after medical personnel voted 270-0 to having “no confidence” in the hospital’s administration. The hospital has drawn controversy for alleged retaliation and union busting against maintenance employees who voted in August 2024 to unionize with the International Union of Operating Engineers. The IUOE has filed unfair labor practice charges against the hospital with the National Labor Relations Board.

According to U.S. News & World Report the hospital tied for the #7th best in Georgia and is high performing in 15 Procedures/Conditions.
