= Piedmont Newnan Hospital =

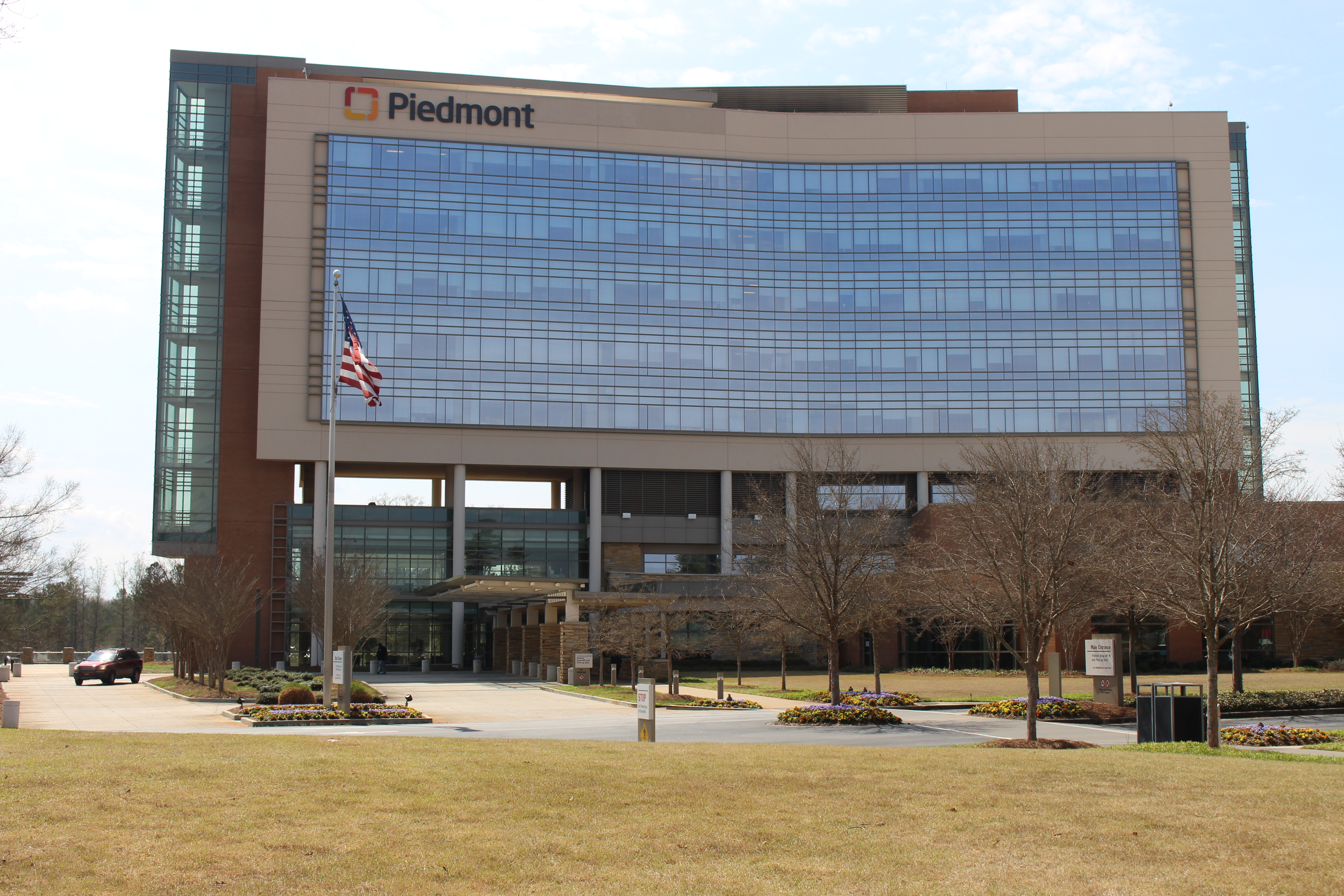

Geography
- Location: 745 Poplar Rd, Newnan, Georgia, United States
- Coordinates: 33°21′27″N 84°45′19″W

Organization
- Care system: Public
- Type: General

Services
- Emergency department: non trauma
- Beds: 217

History
- Opened: 1836

Links
- Website: www.piedmont.org
- Lists: Hospitals in Georgia

Piedmont Newnan Hospital (PNH) is a 217-bed, acute-care hospital located at its new location of 745 Poplar Rd in Newnan, Georgia, offering 24-hour emergency services, women's services, and general medical/surgical services. Diagnostic services include CT, nuclear medicine, MRI, PET, ultrasound and fluoroscopy. Medical and surgical services include laparoscopic surgery, physical therapy, respiratory therapy, sleep studies and exploratory cardiac catheterization and rehabilitation, and wound treatment/hyperbaric therapy.

A new Piedmont Newnan Hospital opened on May 8, 2012. "The new hospital is situated on 105 acres along Poplar Road near I-85. At 362,376 square feet, the 217-bed hospital will have 14 post-partum beds, 18 critical care beds, and 104 general medical/surgical patient beds. The facility also will feature eight operating rooms and 23 patient rooms in the Emergency Department."

With more than 800 employees and a medical staff of over 230 physicians, PNH is a member of Piedmont Healthcare (PHC), organization that also includes Piedmont Hospital, a 481-bed acute tertiary care facility offering all major medical, surgical, and diagnostic services located on 26 acres (110,000 m^{2}) in the north Atlanta community of Buckhead; Piedmont Fayette Hospital, a 315-bed, acute-care community hospital located on Highway 54 in Fayetteville and one of the 100 Top Hospitals in the nation; and Piedmont Mountainside Hospital, a 42-bed community hospital in Jasper. Piedmont Healthcare also is the parent company of the Piedmont Heart Institute (PHI), staffed by more than 85 cardiovascular specialists in Piedmont Heart Institute Physicians with over 30 locations across north Georgia; the Piedmont Physicians Group, with more than 100 primary care physicians in over 30 offices throughout metro Atlanta; the Piedmont Clinic, a 600-member physician network; and Piedmont Philanthropy, the philanthropic entity for private fundraising initiatives.

== History ==
Newnan Hospital was founded in 1836, 10 years after Newnan was founded. It served as a first aid site during Sherman's March to the Sea. That facility was faced with competition in 1965 by Coweta General Hospital (where PNH was previously located). By the start of the 21st century, CCGH was in bankruptcy and needed help. In 2000, Emory Healthcare bought a 50% ownership of CCGH from the current owner Hospital Corporation of America, headquartered in Nashville, Tennessee, and made it Emory-Peachtree Regional Hospital, the first Emory hospital south of Interstate 285, which is what made it regional. In 2004, Newnan Hospital bought EPRH in 2004 after EPRH filed Chapter 13. By 2006, Piedmont was considering a sister hospital to Fayette Community. By December, they bought Newnan Hospital West Campus, as it was called. In 2012, the hospital moved from its Hospital Road location to a new facility located at 745 Poplar Rd, Newnan, GA 30265.
