= Wellstar North Fulton Hospital =

- Wellstar Health System

- Shown in north Metro Atlanta

Geography
- Location: 3000 Hospital Blvd, Roswell, Georgia, United States
- Coordinates: 34.063280°N 84.320548°W

Organization
- Type: General
- Network: Wellstar Health System

Services
- Emergency department: Level II trauma center
- Beds: 218

History
- Founded: November 6, 1983

Links
- Website: wellstar.org/locations/hospital/north-fulton-hospital
- Lists: Hospitals in Georgia

Wellstar North Fulton Hospital (formerly North Fulton Medical Center and North Fulton Regional Hospital) is a major hospital located in Roswell, the ninth-largest city in Georgia. The hospital serves most of north Fulton County, Georgia, as well as neighboring Cherokee, Cobb, Forsyth and Gwinnett counties. Wellstar North Fulton Hospital is the third largest employer in the city of Roswell and is considered the epicenter of the city's growing healthcare industry.

Wellstar North Fulton Hospital is a Level II trauma center, a Level II emergency cardiac care center, and a Joint Commission primary stroke center. Additionally, the hospital is fully accredited and recognized by the American College of Surgeons' Commission on Cancer as an Accredited Cancer Program.

== History ==
The hospital opened in November 1983 as North Fulton Medical Center, a one-story, 108,734 square foot facility providing 24-hour emergency services, as well as obstetrical services, intensive care, coronary care and other out-patient services.

The emergency department underwent a major expansion in 2006 and a new patient tower opened in September 2007, taking the hospital to 202 beds.

In 2016, North Fulton Hospital became part of the Wellstar Health System.

In 2020, the hospital was named one of Newsweek's Best Maternity Hospitals, reporting 809 annual deliveries.

As of 2022, Wellstar North Fulton Hospital hosts 218 beds and employs 800 individuals, plus 400 staff physicians and 200 volunteers.

In May 2022, the hospital broke ground on a $12 million expansion that will be known as the Wellstar North Fulton Cancer Center. It will house Wellstar’s second CyberKnife system, after it began using it at nearby Wellstar Kennestone Hospital in 2006. The new cancer center is expected to open in early 2023.
