= Piedmont Atlanta Hospital =

- Piedmont Healthcare

Geography
- Location: 1968 Peachtree St NW, Atlanta, Georgia, United States
- Coordinates: 33°48′26″N 84°23′37″W

Organization
- Type: General

Services
- Emergency department: Yes
- Beds: 643

Helipads
- Helipad: Yes

History
- Founded: 1905

Links
- Website: piedmont.org/piedmont-atlanta
- Lists: Hospitals in Georgia
- Other links: Hospitals in GA

Piedmont Atlanta Hospital is a 643 bed, non-profit hospital located at 1968 Peachtree Road, Atlanta, Georgia.

== History ==
Piedmont was established in 1905 as the Piedmont Sanitarium, the successor to Amster's private sanitorium, in the former mansion of Charles Thomas Swift of S.S.S. Tonic. The mansion was located at the northwest corner of Capitol and Crumley streets in the then-affluent Washington-Rawson neighborhood. The name was changed to Piedmont Hospital and eventually the hospital took up an entire square block. The Washington-Rawson neighborhood was razed in the early 1960s to make way for Atlanta–Fulton County Stadium and its parking lots; now the site is part of the large Center Parc Stadium parking lot.

== See also ==
- Piedmont Macon North Hospital
