= AdventHealth Gordon =

- AdventHealth

Geography
- Location: Georgia, United States
- Coordinates: 34°30′37″N 84°55′34″W

Organization
- Care system: Private hospital
- Type: General hospital
- Religious affiliation: Seventh-day Adventist Church

Services
- Emergency department: Yes

History
- Former name: Gordon Hospital

Links
- Website: www.adventhealth.com/hospital/adventhealth-gordon
- Lists: Hospitals in Georgia

Adventist Health System Georgia, Inc. (doing business as) AdventHealth Gordon is a non-profit hospital in Calhoun, Georgia, United States owned by AdventHealth. The hospital is designated a primary stroke center.

== History ==
On January 2, 2019, Gordon Hospital was rebranded to AdventHealth Gordon.

On July 18, 2023, the hospital opened northwest Georgia's first obstetric emergency department. In January 2026, AdventHealth Gordon began giving bracelets to mothers suffering from postpartum complications. In September, the hospital was given permission to add a four-bed Level II neonatal intensive care unit by the Georgia Department of Community Health.

== Settlement ==
In January 2022, AdventHealth Gordon settled with the United States Department of Justice for $60,000, after a civil rights complaint by a deaf woman in labor. She had requested an American Sign Language interpreter, but instead, had to rely on lip reading and on her domestic partner.

== Partnership ==
In April 2019, AdventHealth Gordon partnered with Erlanger Health System to offer stroke neurologists through telemedicine, it will help reduce the time to treat the hospital's patients.

== Awards and recognitions ==
The hospital received a grade A from The Leapfrog Group from 2012 to May 2017.

== See also ==
- List of Seventh-day Adventist hospitals
- List of stroke centers in the United States
