= Atrium Health Navicent Health Baldwin =

Navicent Health Baldwin
- Atrium Health Navicent
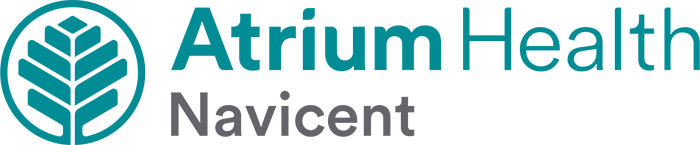

Geography
- Location: 821 North Cobb Street, Milledgeville, Georgia, United States
- Coordinates: 33°05′23.19″N 83°14′47.12″W

Organization
- Network: Atrium Health

Services
- Beds: 140

History
- Former name: Oconee Regional Medical Center
- Opened: 6 March 1957

Links
- Website: www.navicenthealth.org/nhb
- Lists: Hospitals in Georgia

Atrium Health Navicent Baldwin, is a 140-bed hospital in Milledgeville, Georgia, serving Baldwin, Hancock, and Wilkinson counties.

== History ==
In 1953, Baldwin County held a bond referendum favoring the issuance of hospital bonds. Additional funds for hospital construction were obtained from the Federal and State Governments through the Hill-Burton Act. The Commission of Roads and Revenue of Baldwin County established the Baldwin County Hospital Authority under the 1941 Georgia Hospital Authorities Law. The 80-bed Baldwin County Hospital was constructed at a cost of approximately $1,200,000 and formally opened on March 6, 1957. It was dedicated by Governor Marvin Griffin, and the first patients were transferred from Richard Binion Clinic and Scott Hospital.

In 1961, forty-six beds and an intensive care unit were added. In 1969, a major expansion program included a new three-story wing and another two-story addition to an existing wing. During this time, a cobalt therapy suite was added, along with fifty-two private patient rooms, and extensive remodeling was carried out throughout the facility.

In 1979, a Certificate of Need (CON) was obtained to modernize, renovate and expand ancillary services. Bed capacity was reduced from 183 to 160. The Operating Suite, ICU Suite, Emergency Department and other ancillary areas, as well as the Lab and Radiology departments, were enlarged and modernized.

In January 1990, a management contract was signed with Hospital Management Professionals, Inc. Due to the expansion of services and the area served, the name was officially changed to Oconee Regional Medical Center on October 1, 1992.

In 2000, Oconee Regional Medical Center (ORMC) opened Park Tower, adding a new four-floor tower to the existing hospital. This area includes the Education Center, Cardiopulmonary, Surgical Suites, Same Day Surgery, Ambulatory Care, Outpatient Lab, Administration, A Place for Women (Women's Center), Pediatrics and the Post-Surgical Unit.

In 2005, the Emergency Treatment Center was renovated, with the addition of 4,157 square feet (386.2 m^{2}). In 2007, the hospital will started a project to upgrade the equipment in the Cancer Treatment Center, partially funded by Oconee Regional Healthcare Foundation.

In 2017, the management and the board of directors filed for bankruptcy protection. On October 1, 2017, Navicent Health Inc purchased Oconee Regional and changed the hospital's name to Navicent Health Baldwin.

On February 8, 2018, it was announced that Navicent Health would merge with the North Carolina–based healthcare system Atrium Health. On December 20, 2018, they announced that the agreement combining the two organizations had been signed, with Atrium being the controlling party.

On September 23, 2020, Navicent Health Baldwin opened a new Helipad close to the Emergency Room. Todd Dixon, the CEO of Navicent Health Baldwin announced on November 18, 2020, that the name of the hospital will change once again, to Atrium Health Navicent Baldwin.

== EMS ==
ORMC's Emergency medical services were contracted to The Medical Center of Central Georgia located in Macon, Georgia. This transition occurred on July 22, 2007.

Oconee Regional offered a contract to Grady EMS of Atlanta in June 2016, to take effect October 1st of that year, taking over from Navicent Health.
