= Atlanta Medical Center =

Wellstar Atlanta Medical Center
- Wellstar Health System
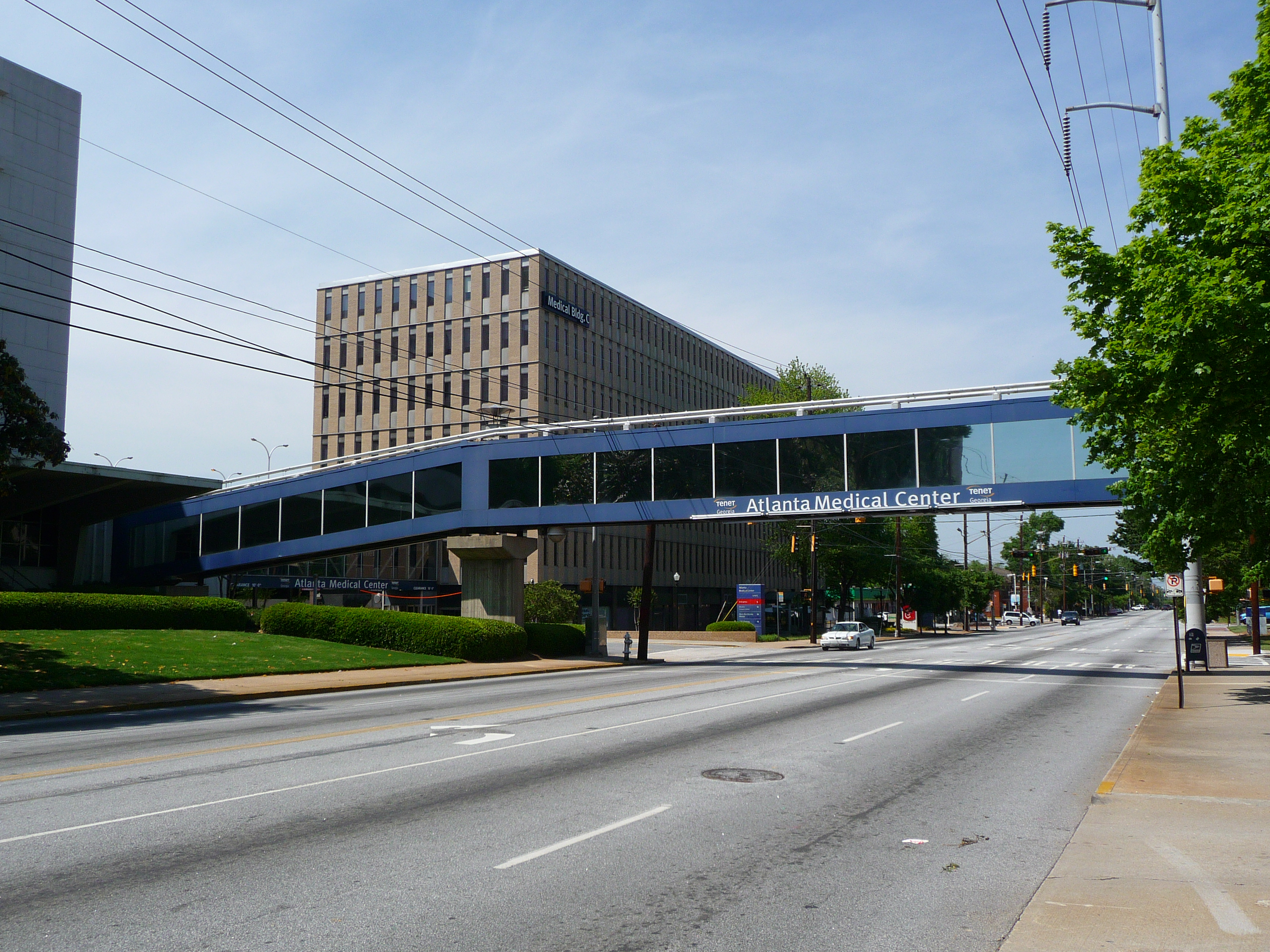
- View from Boulevard

Geography
- Location: Atlanta, Georgia, United States
- Coordinates: 33.76270°N 84.372798°W

Organization
- Care system: Private
- Type: Teaching

Services
- Emergency department: Level I trauma center
- Beds: 460

History
- Founded: 1901
- Closed: 2022

Links
- Website: www.wellstar.org/amc
- Lists: Hospitals in Georgia

Wellstar Atlanta Medical Center (formerly known as Georgia Baptist Hospital) was a hospital in Atlanta, Georgia operated by Wellstar Health System. It had 460 beds and over 700 physicians. The hospital was a Level I Trauma Center, and an Advanced Primary Stroke Center. It housed a Neurointensive Care Unit and a Level III Neonatal ICU.

== History ==
On Thanksgiving Day 1901, the pastor of Tabernacle Baptist Church, Len G. Broughton M.D., created a small infirmary as a new program for his church, operating it out of a rented house. The Tabernacle Infirmary started with only five beds and Broughton as the only doctor, but quickly grew. By 1910 it had 75 beds and a staff of physicians and surgeons, and its own building on Luckie Street (adjacent to the Tabernacle). Broughton also founded a Nurse Training School associated with the Infirmary.

After Broughton left Atlanta for London in 1912, the hospital suffered somewhat. It was sold to the Georgia Baptist Convention for $85,000 in 1913 and was managed by Rev. James Long as Georgia Baptist Hospital. The Baptist organization was not enthusiastic at first about running a hospital but Long overcame that and the business was self-sufficient by 1916.

In 1921 the hospital purchased the former Levi B. Nelson home site at Boulevard and East Avenue (which was destroyed in the Great Atlanta fire of 1917), which is the present location east of downtown Atlanta. The hospital moved from its former Luckie Street location to here late in 1921.

A building program was undertaken starting in 1948 to expand the hospital. In 1956, office space for medical professionals was added. In 1981, air ambulance service was initiated via heliport.

On September 5, 1997, the hospital was sold to Tenet Healthcare and was subsequently renamed Atlanta Medical Center. Effective March 31, 2016, the hospital was sold to Wellstar Health System along with four other Atlanta-area hospitals.

On August 31, 2022, Wellstar Health System announced that Atlanta Medical Center was expected to end operations on November 1, 2022.

Atlanta Medical Center permanently closed at 11:59 p.m. on October 31, 2022.

Demolition of the hospital complex began in June 2025, with plans to create a multi-use development at the site.

== In popular culture ==
This hospital is known for being the birthplace of actress Brittany Murphy.
