= AdventHealth Murray =

- AdventHealth

Geography
- Location: 707 Old Dalton Ellijay Road, Chatsworth, Georgia, United States
- Coordinates: 34°46′48″N 84°46′59″W

Organization
- Care system: Private hospital
- Type: General hospital

Services
- Standards: Joint Commission
- Emergency department: Yes
- Beds: 42

Helipads
- Helipad: No

History
- Former name: Murray Medical Center
- Opened: 1949

Links
- Website: www.adventhealth.com/hospital/adventhealth-murray
- Lists: Hospitals in Georgia

Adventist Health System Georgia, Inc. (doing business as AdventHealth Murray) is a non-profit hospital in Chatsworth, Georgia, United States owned by AdventHealth. It was formerly owned by Murray County Hospital Authority Board. The hospital is a designated remote treatment stroke center.

== History ==
In 1949, Murray Medical Center was founded. On September 29, 2014, Adventist Health System and Murray County Hospital Authority Board signed a lease agreement for Murray Medical Center. Adventist Health System paid the $5.1 million debt the Murray County Hospital Authority Board owed to Hamilton Health Care System. On January 2, 2019, Murray Medical Center was rebranded to AdventHealth Murray.

On December 15, 2020, AdventHealth purchased AdventHealth Murray from the Murray County Hospital Authority Board.

In late March 2024, the Chatsworth City Council approved the annexation of 41 acres (17 ha) west of U.S. Route 76, for a new hospital to replace AdventHealth Murray. On May 12, 2026, it was announced that the new hospital would be 185,000 square foot (17,200 m^{2}) and have a medical office building. The newer smaller 42-bed hospital will have stonework from Northwest Georgia, and the medical facility will be able to expand at the site in the future. On September 2, there was a groundbreaking for the new campus, and in attendance was Brian Kemp and Marty Kemp.

== Partnership ==
In April 2019, AdventHealth Murray partnered with Erlanger Health System to offer stroke neurologists through telemedicine, it will help reduce the time to treat the hospital's patients.

== Awards and recognitions ==
AdventHealth Murray received from the Centers for Medicare & Medicaid Services a five-star rating from 2021 to 2023. And received it again in 2025 to 2026. On December 4, 2025, medical facility was recognized by Forbes in its new Top Hospitals list with a five star ranking.

== See also ==
- List of Seventh-day Adventist hospitals
- List of stroke centers in the United States
