= Northeast Georgia Medical Center Gainesville =

- Northeast Georgia Health System

Geography
- Location: Gainesville, Georgia, United States
- Coordinates: 34.1199°N 83.8376°W

Services
- Emergency department: Level I trauma center
- Beds: 987

Helipads
- Helipad: Yes

History
- Founded: 1951

Links
- Website: www.nghs.com/locations/gainesville
- Lists: Hospitals in Georgia

Northeast Georgia Medical Center Gainesville is a non-profit, 987-bed hospital in Gainesville, Georgia owned and operated by Northeast Georgia Health System.

== History ==
Hall County Hospital, the predecessor to Northeast Georgia Medical Center Gainesville, opened on September 1, 1951, as a 90-bed hospital. The hospital's creation was the result of the merger of two existing hospitals: Downey Hospital, a private hospital founded in 1908 in the home of Dr. James Henry Downey, and the previous Hall County Hospital, a public hospital with an almshouse for the poor and elderly. Hall County Hospital underwent a $10 million expansion and was renamed Northeast Georgia Medical Center in 1976. In 2023, the hospital was designated as Georgia's fifth American College of Surgeons (ACS) verified Level I trauma center.

== Services ==
Northeast Georgia Medical Center Gainesville is a Level I trauma center and a comprehensive stroke center. The hospital also features a labor and delivery unit, a children's inpatient service, and a Level III neonatal intensive care unit. Northeast Georgia Medical Center Gainesville's campus is home to Laurelwood Behavioral Health, a 54-bed inpatient behavioral health facility.
