= Piedmont Macon North Hospital =

Coordinates: 32°52′18″N 83°41′41″W

- Piedmont Healthcare
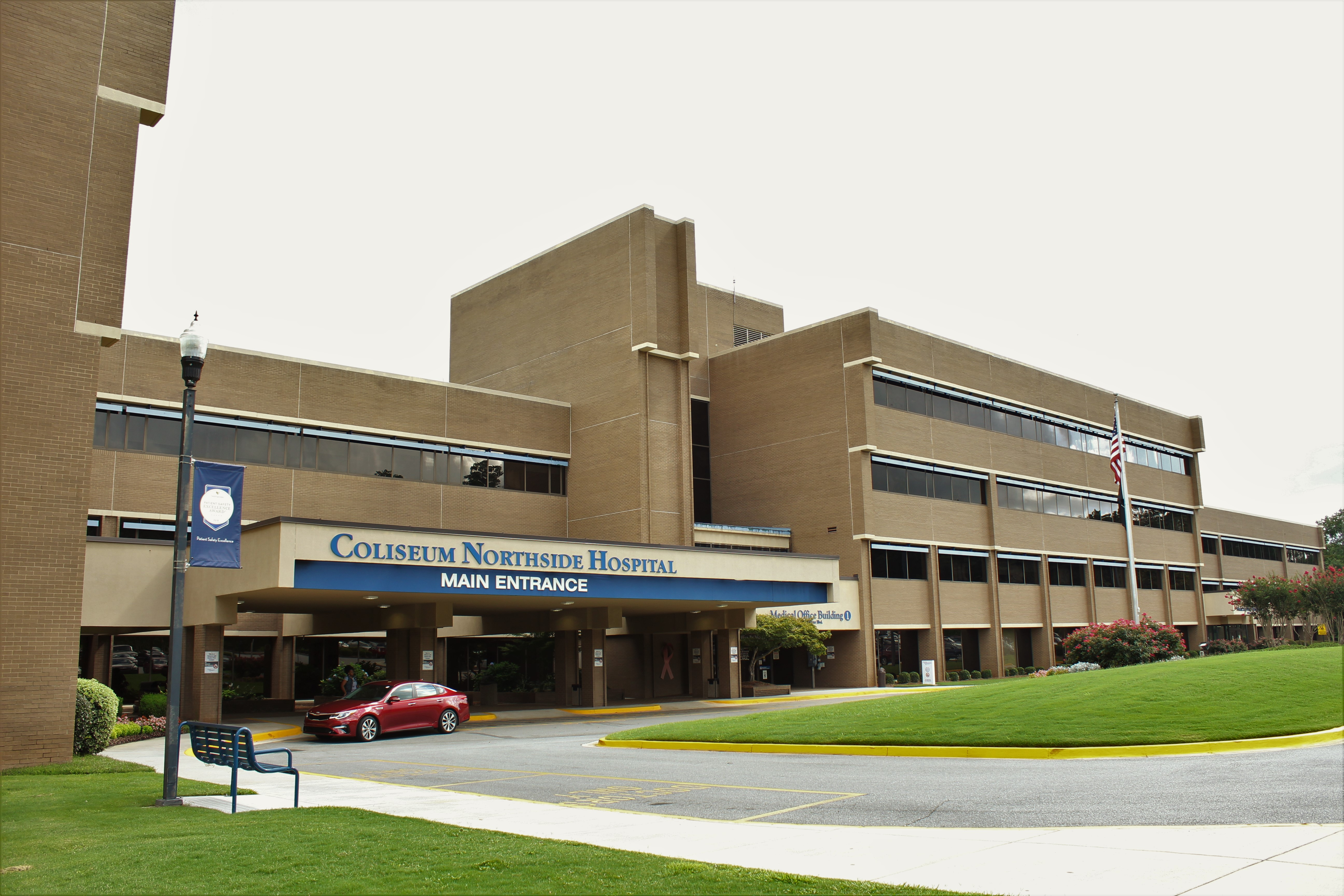
- Main entrance to Piedmont Macon North Hospital, formerly Coliseum Northside Hospital

Geography
- Location: 400 Charter Blvd, Macon, Georgia, United States

Organization
- Type: General Acute Care

Services
- Beds: 103

History
- Former names: Charter Northside Hospital, Coliseum Northside Hospital
- Opened: 1984

Links
- Website: www.coliseumhealthsystem.com
- Lists: Hospitals in Georgia

Piedmont Macon North Hospital, located in Macon, Georgia, is a General Acute Care Hospital meaning that they are able to treat and cover many different kinds of injuries and illnesses for many people. The hospital was officially recognized on 18 December 1989.

== History ==
In 1984, the hospital was founded as Charter Northside Hospital. In 1993, Charter Northside Hospital was bought by a company called Quorum. In 1998, the hospital merged with other hospitals in Macon through the Hospital Corporation of America (HCA) in Georgia becoming one of nine hospitals owned by this company. The other hospitals Coliseum Northside was affiliated with were: Cartersville Medical Center, Coliseum Medical Centers, Doctors Hospital (Augusta, Georgia), Eastside Medical Center, Fairview Park Hospital, Memorial Health, Memorial Satilla Health, and Redmond Regional Medical Center. In 2005, it officially became known as Coliseum Northside Hospital to identify it with its partner Macon hospital, Coliseum Medical Center.

On 11 September 2017, Greg Caples officially became the CEO of Coliseum Northside Hospital.

On 11, May 2021, the Hospital Corporation of America (HCA) reached an agreement to sell both Coliseum Northside Hospital and Coliseum Medical Centers to Piedmont Health based in Atlanta. Unlike HCA, Piedmont is a non-profit hospital operator. In August 2021, the sale became complete and Coliseum Northside was renamed Piedmont Macon North Hospital.

== Services ==
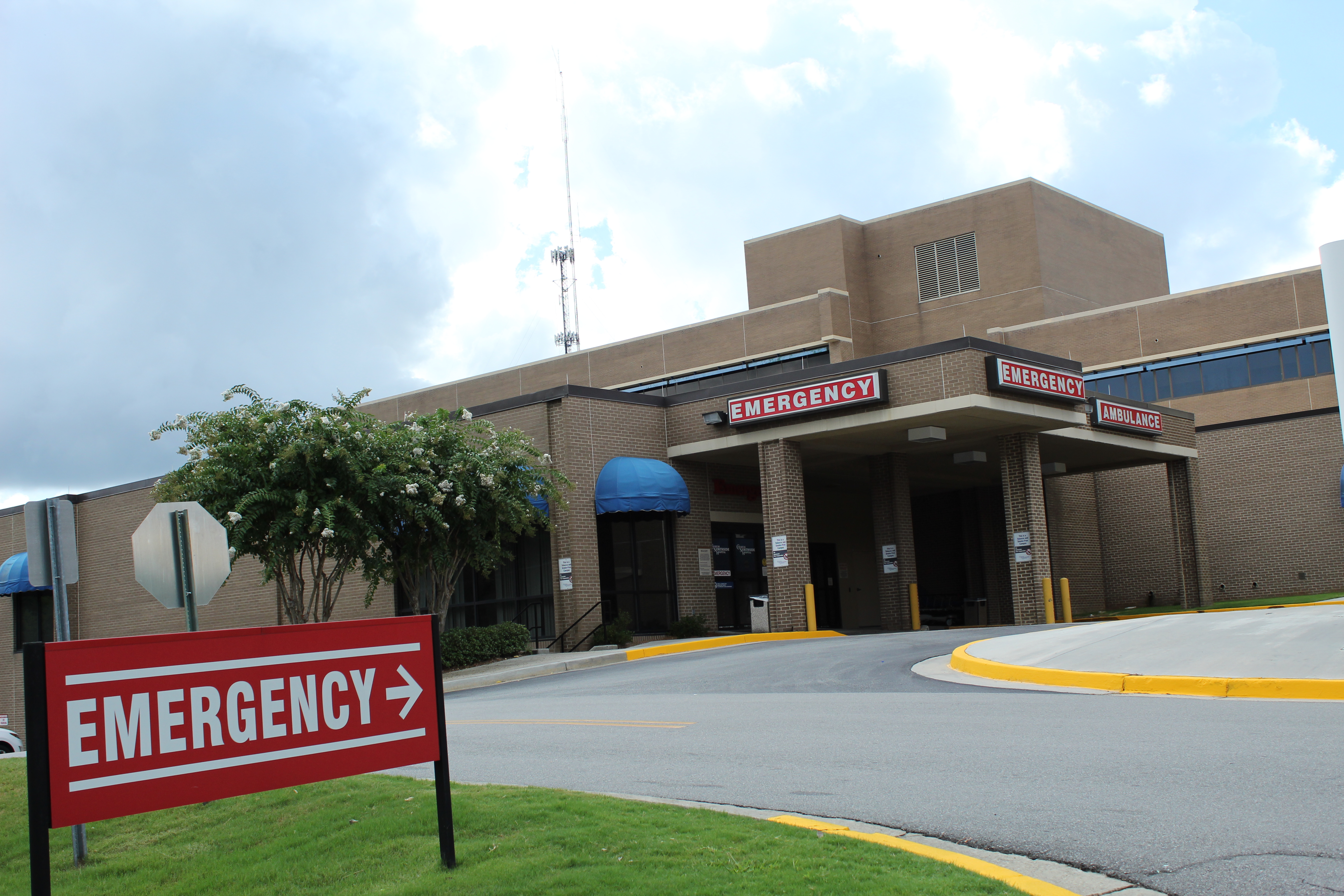
Coliseum Northside Hospital's Emergency room

Coliseum Northside Hospital offers many different kinds of services such as:

- Emergency Care
- Gastroenterology Care
- Breast Health
- Lung and Respiratory
- Orthopedic Care
- Rehabilitation
- Sleep Disorder Care
- Radiology
- Stroke Care
- Surgery including Bariatric Surgery
- Woman's Care
- Wound Care

The emergency rooms are open 24/7, offers treatment for all adults and children, and had space for six new beds to be added to the hospital in 2018. When it comes to their gastroenterology services, Coliseum Northside treats a wide variety of ailments such as Gastroesophageal reflux disease, Ulcerative colitis, Crohn's disease, Appendicitis and many more. The hospital uses Cellvizio to detect cancer early. Many new technologies are offered to assist in treating patients with a Respiratory disease such as Video-assisted thoracoscopic surgery. The sleep disorder center is certified by the American Academy of Sleep Medicine and offers care for sleep disorders such as Insomnia and Narcolepsy. The advanced wound care center treats patients who have wounds that have not been healing up as quickly as they should and may utilize Hyperbaric medicine to assist in the healing process.

== Classes Offered ==
Coliseum Northside Hospital offers a wide variety of classes on their campus alongside the classes that are also taught at the Coliseum Medical Centers.

The classes offered are:

- AARP Defensive Driving
- Pre-surgery Class
- Shoulder Pain and Treatment Options
- Lap-Band Support Group

The AARP Defensive Driving class costs twenty dollars while the rest of the classes offered are free.

== Recognition and awards ==
Coliseum Northside Hospital earned the 2019 Patient Safety Excellence Award from Healthgrades. They have also earned an 'A' rating in 2018 from the Leapfrog Group for patient safety.
