= Wellstar Health System =

American healthcare organization

Wellstar Health System (formerly WellStar) is a non-profit system founded in 1993 providing comprehensive care in Metro Atlanta, Georgia, United States. It includes:

- Augusta University Medical Center
- Center for Health Transformation
- Spalding Regional Hospital
- Sylvan Grove Hospital
- Wellstar Cobb Hospital, Austell, Georgia
- Wellstar College of Health and Human Services, Kennesaw, Georgia
- Wellstar Douglas Hospital, Douglasville, Georgia
- Wellstar Kennestone Hospital, Marietta, Georgia
- Wellstar North Fulton Hospital
- Wellstar Paulding Hospital, Hiram, Georgia
- Wellstar West Georgia Medical Center LaGrange, Georgia
- Wellstar Windy Hill Hospital, Marietta, Georgia

Former campuses:

- Atlanta Medical Center South Campus
- Atlanta Medical Center
