= WellStar Kennestone Regional Medical Center =

Wellstar Kennestone Regional Medical Center
- Wellstar Health System

Geography
- Location: 677 Church Street NE, Marietta, Georgia, United States

Organization
- Type: General Hospital

Services
- Emergency department: Level I trauma center

Helipads
- Helipad: (FAA LID: 56GA)

History
- Former name: WellStar Kennestone Hospital

Links
- Website: https://www.wellstar.org/locations/hospital/kennestone-hospital
- Lists: Hospitals in Georgia

Wellstar Kennestone Regional Medical Center (formerly WellStar Kennestone Hospital) is a major tertiary-care hospital located in Marietta, Georgia, serving most of northern and central Cobb County, Georgia, as well as adjacent counties. It is currently an ACS-verified Level I Trauma, Comprehensive Cardiac, and Level I/Comprehensive Stroke Center.

Kennestone Hospital opened in June 1950 as a 105-bed-facility. It was named after the land which it was built upon, where both Kennesaw Mountain and Stone Mountain were visible. In 1959, the hospital's capacity increased to 300 beds with the opening of the south wing. The hospital has since grown to more than 630 beds and includes several critical care units. On June 22, 1988, the nation's first laparoscopic gall bladder removal took place at Kennestone.

In 1993, Kennestone Hospital merged with five other facilities to become Northwest Georgia Health System. The other hospitals were: Cobb, Douglas, Paulding and Windy Hill. In 1998, Northwest became WellStar Health System. The health system was rebranded in 2022 as Wellstar Health System.

In 2011, Kennestone hospital was upgraded to a Level II trauma center, making it the third level II trauma center in Metro Atlanta.

In early 2013, Wellstar Kennestone Hospital was renamed Wellstar Kennestone Regional Medical Center.

In 2020, Wellstar Kennestone Regional Medical Center opened a 200+ bed Emergency Department connected by a pedestrian bridge to the main hospital. With its 166 beds, the new 266,000 square foot Emergency Department became the largest emergency department in Georgia and one of the largest in the United States. It is equipped with 4 dedicated CT scanners, a dedicated MRI, and a 12-bed resuscitation area for stabilization of trauma, stroke, cardiac, and other critical patients. The emergency department ranks as one of the busiest in the nation with more than 147,000 patients seen annually.

In 2024, Kennestone hospital was upgraded to a Level I trauma center, making it the second level I trauma center in Metro Atlanta.

The hospital is home to graduate medical education programs in family medicine, internal medicine, emergency medicine, obstetrics and gynecology, surgery, and palliative care.

Wrestling star Scott Hall died at this hospital on March 14, 2022.
