= Ty Cobb Healthcare System =

Nonprofit health care organization in Georgia, USA

The Ty Cobb Healthcare System in Royston in the US state of Georgia began as a single hospital in 1950, with a donation by baseball player Ty Cobb. Since then it grew to include a new medical center, smaller local health centers, and hospitals.

Ty Cobb Healthcare System is a private self-supporting nonprofit health care organization consisting of Cobb Memorial Hospital, Cobb Memorial Outpatient Diagnostic Center, Brown Memorial Convalescent Center, Cobb Health Care Center, Home Base Health Services, Hart County Hospital, Cobb Center Apartments, Inc. and Ty Cobb Regional Medical Center. Building the latter medical center (in 2010) made the system run a debt of over $60 million; in 2015, the Ty Cobb Regional Medical was taken over by St. Mary's Health Care and its parent, Trinity Health, for $12.9 million.

== History ==
Ty Cobb donated $100,000 in January 1950 to help his hometown of Royston, Georgia, build a 24-bed hospital, fitted with the latest equipment. The institution was initially run by Cobb's boyhood friend, Dr. Stewart Brown. The original Board of Directors of the proposed hospital held their organizational meeting at the home of Dr. and Mrs. Stewart Brown on November 6, 1947. Dr. Brown, a widely respected physician and surgeon, served as Cobb Memorial Hospital's first superintendent. In 2009 the hospital system controversially closed the hospital and moved it to Lavonia, Ga.

== Elements ==
=== Ty Cobb Regional Medical Center ===
Ty Cobb Healthcare System Incorporated announced on June 10, 2009, that it would close down Cobb Memorial Hospital and Hart County Hospital consolidating them into a new $52 million, 56-bed, regional medical center in the nearby town of Lavonia, called Ty Cobb Regional Medical Center. Ty Cobb Healthcare System applied to the state Department of Community Health in mid-July for formal permission to build the new hospital.

=== Cobb Memorial Hospital ===
Cobb Memorial Hospital in Royston is a 71-bed medical and surgical facility includes a modern birthing center, a 24-hour emergency department, and a state of the art Outpatient Diagnostic Center.

=== Hart County Hospital ===
Hart County Hospital is an 82-bed, full-service hospital that serves Hart, Franklin, and Elbert counties and the surrounding areas. Fully accredited by the Joint Commission on Accreditation of Healthcare Organizations (JCAHO), the hospital has over 83 doctors, 200 support staff members, and a 24-hour emergency department.

=== Other elements ===
- Brown Memorial Convalescent Center is a 144-bed hospital-based long-term care facility located adjacent to Cobb Memorial Hospital in Royston.
- Hartwell Health Care Center is a 92-bed hospital-based long-term care facility located in Hartwell, Georgia.
- Cobb Health Care Center is a 116-bed hospital-based long-term care facility located in Comer, Georgia.
- The Gables at Cobb Village is a 48-bed special residential community serving senior adults with assisted living services.
- Cobb Center Apartments, Inc. is a 24-unit HUD independent living housing project.
