= East Cobb Baseball =

East Cobb Baseball, also known as ECB, Inc. is a baseball program/complex located in the suburbs of the metro Atlanta area, United States that, as of 2007, was one of metro Atlanta's highest earners. The founder and owner of the team is Guerry Baldwin, with Bill Clements a founding coach. Its tournaments are known for drawing the region's top players.

== History ==
East Marietta National Little League won the Little League World Series in 1983 and were coached by Richard Hilton. The majority of the players from that team joined the first East Cobb team the following year as 13-year-olds and were coached by Guerry Baldwin, who spearheaded the nationally renowned program.

The program was established in 1985. Russ Umphenhour, who is an entrepreneur, noticed Baldwin's success with his players and old club. This sparked the idea of building a complex for developing youth baseball players.

== The Complex ==
The complex is a 30-acre (120,000 m^{2}), eight diamond, multimillion-dollar facility complete with indoor and outdoor batting cages. It is located about twenty miles (32 km) away from downtown Atlanta. The complex is home to 80+ teams including the East Cobb Twins, East Cobb Yankees, East Cobb Prime, East Cobb Colt 45's, East Cobb Tigers, East Cobb Rangers, East Cobb Braves, East Cobb Bandits, East Cobb Cubs, East Cobb Patriots, and Team East Cobb, among others. It was further renovated in 2021 at which time the complex was renamed TOP Chops East Cobb Baseball Complex.
