= Piedmont Henry Hospital =

Geography
- Location: Stockbridge, Georgia, United States
- Coordinates: 33.509090°N 84.225410°W

Organization
- Type: General
- Network: Piedmont Healthcare

Services
- Standards: Joint Commission
- Emergency department: Yes
- Beds: 259

Helipads
- Helipad: FAA LID: 43GA

History
- Founded: 1979

Links
- Website: http://www.piedmont.org/locations/piedmont-henry/phh-home
- Lists: Hospitals in Georgia

Piedmont Henry Hospital is a 215-bed not-for-profit, community-based hospital located in Stockbridge, Georgia. In August 2011, the community hospital's executive Board agreed to affiliate with Piedmont Healthcare.

== Certification ==
The hospital is accredited by DNV-GL and is ISO:9001-2015 certified. The hospital's laboratory is certified by Joint Commission.

== History ==
Henry Medical Center was founded on July 9, 1979, as Henry General Hospital with 104 beds.

In 1995, the hospital renamed itself Henry Medical Center.

In 2011, the hospital became Piedmont Henry Hospital after affiliation with Piedmont Healthcare.

== Expansion ==
In 2006, Henry Medical Center completed its North Tower, expanding its operations to include 215 beds.

In July 2010, Henry Medical Center opened the Henry Radiation Oncology Center in a joint venture with Radiation Oncology Services.

In 2018, Piedmont Henry Hospital became a 236-bed facility.

In early 2024, the hospital began construction on a new patient tower. When complete in 2026, the new East Tower will add 96 patient rooms. This will bring the hospital to a total of 355 beds. In addition, the expansion includes adding three new operating rooms bringing the hospital to a total of 14, constructing a new kitchen and dining area, and building a new central energy plant.

== Controversy ==
In September 2024, US Senator Ron Wyden sent a letter to Piedmont Henry's CEO, David Kent, asking whether the hospital had delayed or denied emergency care to pregnant patients as a result of a Georgia law banning most abortions in the state. The letter followed an earlier investigation published by ProPublica into the death at Piedmont Henry of 28-year-old patient Amber Nicole Thurman, who had to wait 20 hours for a dilation and curettage procedure at the hospital in August 2022 and whose death a Georgia maternal mortality review committee later found to be "preventable."
