= AdventHealth Redmond =

Hospital in Rome, Georgia, U.S.

- AdventHealth

Geography
- Location: 501 Redmond Road, Rome, Georgia, United States
- Coordinates: 34.27685°N 85.19497°W

Organization
- Care system: Private hospital
- Type: General hospital and Teaching hospital
- Religious affiliation: Seventh-day Adventist Church

Services
- Standards: Joint Commission
- Emergency department: Level III trauma center
- Beds: 230

Helipads
- Helipad: Aeronautical chart and airport information for GA12 at SkyVector

History
- Former names: Redmond Park Hospital; Redmond Regional Medical Center
- Opened: 1972

Links
- Website: www.adventhealth.com/hospital/adventhealth-redmond
- Lists: Hospitals in the United States

Redmond Park Hospital, LLC. (doing business as AdventHealth Redmond ) is a non-profit hospital in Rome, Georgia, United States owned by AdventHealth. In 2020, the Georgia Department of Public Health designated the hospital a Level 1 Emergency Cardiac Care Center. The hospital is also designated as a Level III trauma center, and a primary stroke center. It was purchased from HCA Healthcare in October 2021. The hospital was designated a Pathway to Excellence by the American Nurses Credentialing Center in 2026.

== History ==
On July 4, 1972, Redmond Park Hospital was founded, it was built with money from Hospital Corporation of America. On August 20, 1974, physician Sidney A. Bell performed the first knee replacement in northwest Georgia at the hospital. In April 1975, Redmond Park Hospital became the first in the region to open a catheterization laboratory. In 1978, the hospital had a 9,000 square foot (840 m^{2}) expansion added for the cardiopulmonary department . It also had a 30,000 square foot (2,800 m^{2}) expansion that added a fifth floor and it expanded the critical care unit, emergency department recovery room and radiology.

In the late 1980s, Redmond Park Hospital changed its name to Redmond Regional Medical Center. On October 22, 1986, physician Daniel Goldfaden performed the first cardiac surgery in the region at the hospital. In 1987, the hospital performed the regions first angioplasty.

In 1990, Redmond Regional Medical Center was used to test the tissue-type plasminogen activator. In August 1990, the hospital was the first in the country to use the Vista DDD pacemaker. In 1992, it became the second hospital in the country to use a glucomander.

On May 13, 2021, HCA Healthcare signed a definitive agreement to purchase Redmond Regional Medical Center and its related businesses, physician clinic operations, outpatient services and equity interests to AdventHealth for $635 million. Before being sold the hospital had been part of HCA Healthcare for forty-eight years.

On October 1, 2021, Redmond Regional Medical Center purchased AdventHealth becoming the third hospital to join the hospital network in Georgia, it was the last hospital in northwest Georgia sold by HCA Healthcare. In January 2022, it was renamed AdventHealth Redmond. By purchasing the hospital AdventHealth also became the official manager of the Polk County emergency medical services. Before being bought by AdventHealth, Redmond Medical Center paid Floyd County $1,378,000 in taxes.

On February 21, 2025, AdventHealth Redmond had a groundbreaking for a 40,000 square foot (3,700 m^{2}) Heart and Vascular Institute. On August 13, there was a topping out of the building. On April 16, 2026, there was a grand opening for the facility and four days later it began treating patients. On April 29, the hospital received $934,000 from the United States government to expand rural transportation.

On August 26, 2026, the hospital performed its first Ion robotic bronchoscopy.

== Off campus facility ==
On May 30, 2025, AdventHealth Redmond had a groundbreaking for a 30,000 square foot (2,800 m^{2}) medical office building with a cancer center for women adjacent of AdventHealth Stadium. On December 10, there was a topping out of the building. On July 15, 2026, there was a grand opening for the facility.

== Awards and recognitions ==
The hospital received a grade B from The Leapfrog Group from spring 2012 to fall 2013. It received a grade A from spring 2014 to fall 2015, and received it again fall 2016 to 2017.

AdventHealth Redmond received from the Centers for Medicare & Medicaid Services a five-star rating from 2022 to 2023. The medical facility was recognized by Healthgrades with its America's 250 Best Hospital Award from 2023 to 2025. In early August 2025, it was name Best Regional Hospital in Northwest Georgia by U.S. News & World Report. On December 4, 2025, the medical facility was recognized by Forbes in its new Top Hospitals list with a five star ranking.

== See also ==
- List of Seventh-day Adventist hospitals
- List of stroke centers in the United States
- List of trauma centers in the United States
