= Piedmont Healthcare =

Healthcare organization in Georgia, United States

Coordinates: 33°48′17″N 84°24′51″W

Piedmont Healthcare is a not-for-profit health system in Georgia comprising 26 hospitals, 75 Piedmont Urgent Care centers, 25 QuickCare locations, and 1,875 Piedmont Clinic physician practices. They are the largest health system in the state of Georgia.
