= List of AdventHealth hospitals =

On January 2, 2019, the hospitals rebranded to the trade name AdventHealth, except for the hospitals in Colorado, Illinois and one in Texas that were part of joint ventures.

AdventHealth Orlando is the second largest hospital in Florida, and the largest in Central Florida, it was also the third largest hospital in the United States in 2023. The second largest Florida hospital owned by the nonprofit organization is AdventHealth Tampa, it is also the fifth largest hospital in the Tampa Bay area. The third largest Florida hospital owned by the nonprofit organization is AdventHealth Daytona Beach, it is also the second largest hospital in the Deltona-Daytona Beach-Ormond Beach metropolitan area.

The nonprofit organizations largest hospital in Colorado is AdventHealth Porter, and it is also the ninth largest in the state. The nonprofit organizations largest hospital in Kansas is AdventHealth Shawnee Mission. The nonprofits organizations largest hospital in Georgia is AdventHealth Redmond.

Since the 2010s, many of the AdventHealth hospitals in Florida received a grade A from The Leapfrog Group, and in the 2020s almost all of the hospitals in Florida were still receiving a grade A. Twenty-nine of the forty hospitals that participated in a survey by The Leapfrog Group received a grade A in November 2025, nine received a grade B, and 6 received a grade C.

Almost all of the AdventHealth hospitals in Florida are certified as stroke centers, in Northwest Georgia all three are certified stroke centers, in Illinois all four in the Chicago metropolitan area are certified as stroke centers, in Colorado all five in the Denver metropolitan area are certified stroke centers,, in Texas two are certified as stroke centers, and three in Kansas are certified as stroke centers. There are three AdventHealth hospitals that are certified by the American College of Surgeons as trauma centers, but its four hospitals in Illinois are not recognized by it and instead are certified by the Illinois Department of Public Health as trauma centers.

== Hospitals ==
AdventHealth Central Florida Division*
AdventHealth East Florida Division**
AdventHealth West Florida Division***
American College of Surgeons trauma centers‡

Comprehensive stroke center
Primary stroke center
Acute stroke-ready hospital Remote treatment stroke center
Emergent stroke ready hospital

Photo	Hospital	Settlement	U.S. state	Emergency department	Helipad	Notes
	AdventHealth Altamonte Springs*	Altamonte Springs	Florida	✓	Aeronautical chart and airport information for 01FD at SkyVector	Formerly named Florida Hospital Altamonte
	AdventHealth Apopka*	Apopka	Florida	✓	Aeronautical chart and airport information for 1FA2 at SkyVector	Adventist Health System purchased North Orange Memorial Hospital in 1975.
	AdventHealth Avista	Louisville	Colorado	✓	Aeronautical chart and airport information for CO45 at SkyVector	Adventist Health System Sunbelt Healthcare Corporation acquired Avista Adventist Hospital, when PorterCare Adventist Health System merged on October 1, 2001. Avista Adventist Hospital rebranded to its current name on August 1, 2023, after Centura Health split up.
	AdventHealth Carrollwood***	Egypt Lake-Leto	Florida	✓		Adventist Health System acquired University Community-Carrollwood, when University Community Health merged on September 1, 2010 In late September 2011, it was rebranded to Florida Hospital Carrollwood.
	AdventHealth Castle Rock	Castle Rock	Colorado	✓	Aeronautical chart and airport information for 50CO at SkyVector	Original hospital that opened August 1, 2013. Castle Rock Adventist Hospital rebranded to its current name on August 1, 2023, after Centura Health Split up.
	AdventHealth Celebration*	Celebration	Florida	✓	Aeronautical chart and airport information for 77FL at SkyVector	Formerly named Florida Hospital Celebration Health
	AdventHealth Central Texas	Killeen	Texas	✓	Aeronautical chart and airport information for 92TS at SkyVector	Formerly named Metroplex Adventist Hospital
	AdventHealth Connerton***	Land o' Lakes	Florida	✗		Adventist Health System acquired Long Term Acute Care Hospital at Connerton, when University Community Health merged on September 1, 2010. In late September 2011, it was rebranded to Florida Hospital at Connerton Long Term Acute Care.
	AdventHealth Dade City***	Dade City	Florida	✓	Yes	Adventist Health System acquired Bayfront Health Dade City from Community Health Systems on April 1, 2018, it was renamed Florida Hospital Dade City after Florida Hospital took over management.
	AdventHealth Daytona Beach**	Daytona Beach	Florida	✓	Aeronautical chart and airport information for 4FL6 at SkyVector	Adventist Health System acquired Ormond Beach Memorial, when Memorial Health Systems merged in 2000. It was later renamed to Florida Hospital Ormond Memorial, and after moving to Daytona Beach it was renamed to Florida Hospital Memorial Medical Center.
	AdventHealth DeLand**	DeLand	Florida	✓	Aeronautical chart and airport information for 2FD9 at SkyVector	Formerly named Florida Hospital DeLand
	AdventHealth Durand	Durand	Wisconsin	✓	Aeronautical chart and airport information for WI57 at SkyVector	Formerly named Chippewa Valley Hospital & Oakview Care Center
	AdventHealth East Orlando*	Orlando	Florida	✓	Aeronautical chart and airport information for FD36 at SkyVector	Florida Hospital acquired Orlando General Hospital on December 31, 1990.
	AdventHealth Fish Memorial**	Orange City	Florida	✓	Aeronautical chart and airport information for 3FL2 at SkyVector	Formerly named Florida Hospital Fish Memorial
	AdventHealth for Children*	Orlando	Florida	✓		Original hospital that opened March 30, 2011, it replaced an older smaller facility named Florida Children's Hospital.
	AdventHealth for Women*	Orlando	Florida	✓		Original hospital that opened January 24, 2016
	AdventHealth Gordon	Calhoun	Georgia	✓	Aeronautical chart and airport information for GE02 at SkyVector	Formerly named Gordon Hospital
	AdventHealth Heart of Florida***	Davenport	Florida	✓	Aeronautical chart and airport information for 2FL9 at SkyVector	AdventHealth acquired Heart of Florida Regional Medical Center from Community Health Systems on September 1, 2019.
	AdventHealth Hendersonville	Hendersonville	North Carolina	✓		Adventist Health System acquired Park Ridge Hospital in 1984.
	AdventHealth Kissimmee*	Kissimmee	Florida	✓	Aeronautical chart and airport information for 85FD at SkyVector	In late August 1993, Florida Hospital purchased Kissimmee Memorial Hospital from Columbia Hospital Corporation. Officially making Florida Hospital Kissimmee the fifth hospital to be operated by the subsidiary.
	AdventHealth Lake Nona*	Orlando	Florida		Aeronautical chart and airport information for 3FA4 at SkyVector	An original hospital to open in December 2026.
	AdventHealth Lake Placid***	Lake Placid	Florida	✓	Aeronautical chart and airport information for 30FA at SkyVector	Formerly named Florida Hospital Heartland Medical Center Lake Placid
	AdventHealth Lake Wales***	Lake Wales	Florida	✓		AdventHealth acquired Lake Wales Medical Center from Community Health Systems on September 1, 2019.
	AdventHealth Lenexa City Center	Lenexa	Kansas	✓		Original hospital that opened July 15, 2025
	AdventHealth Littleton‡	Littleton	Colorado	✓	Aeronautical chart and airport information for CO16 at SkyVector	Adventist Health System Sunbelt Healthcare Corporation acquired Little Adventist Hospital, when PorterCare Adventist Health System merged on October 1, 2001. Littleton Adventist Hospital rebranded to its current name on August 1, 2023, after Centura Health split up.
	AdventHealth Manchester	Manchester	Kentucky	✓	Aeronautical chart and airport information for 4KY2 at SkyVector	Formerly named Manchester Memorial Hospital
	AdventHealth Millenia*	Orlando	Florida		Aeronautical chart and airport information for 1FA8 at SkyVector	Construction to begin date for hospital unknown.
	AdventHealth Minneola*	Minneola	Florida	✓	Aeronautical chart and airport information for 24FA at SkyVector	Original hospital that opened December 10, 2025
	AdventHealth Murray	Chatsworth	Georgia	✓		AdventHealth acquired the hospital on December 15, 2020, from the Murray County Hospital Authority Board.
	AdventHealth New Smyrna Beach**	New Smyrna	Florida	✓		On April, 1, 2016, Adventist Health System began leasing Bert Fish Medical Center from the Southeast Volusia Hospital District, the hospital was renamed Florida Hospital New Smyrna.
	AdventHealth North Pinellas***	Tarpon Springs	Florida	✓	Aeronautical chart and airport information for FA58 at SkyVector	Adventist Health System acquired Helen Ellis Memorial Hospital, when University Community Health merged on September 1, 2010. In early March 2012, it was rebranded to Florida Hospital North Pinellas.
	AdventHealth Ocala***	Ocala	Florida	✓	Aeronautical chart and airport information for 57FD at SkyVector	Adventist Health System began leasing Munroe Regional Medical Center after purchasing a forty year lease from Community Health Systems on August 1, 2018, the hospital was renamed Florida Hospital Ocala. It became the 28th hospital to be operated by Florida Hospital.
	AdventHealth Orlando*	Orlando	Florida	✓	Aeronautical chart and airport information for 37FA at SkyVector	Original hospital that opened October 1908.
	AdventHealth Ottawa	Ottawa	Kansas	✓		On May 1, 2019, AdventHealth began leasing Ransom Memorial Health.
	AdventHealth Palm Coast**	Palm Coast	Florida	✓	Aeronautical chart and airport information for 61FD at SkyVector	Adventist Health System acquired Memorial Hospital-Flagler, when Memorial Health Systems merged in 2000. The hospital was moved to Palm Coast and renamed Florida Hospital Flagler.
	AdventHealth Palm Coast Parkway**	Palm Coast	Florida	✓	Aeronautical chart and airport information for 1FD0 at SkyVector	Original hospital that opened August 2, 2023
	AdventHealth Parker‡	Parker	Colorado	✓	Aeronautical chart and airport information for CD31 at SkyVector	Original hospital that opened February 3, 2004. Parker Adventist Hospital rebranded to its current name on August 1, 2023, after Centura Health split up.
	AdventHealth Polk	Columbus	North Carolina	✓	Aeronautical chart and airport information for 9NC9 at SkyVector	AdventHealth began leasing St. Luke's Hospital in October 2024, they will be leasing the facility for twenty years.
	AdventHealth Port Charlotte***	Port Charlotte	Florida	✓	Aeronautical chart and airport information for FA01 at SkyVector	AdventHealth acquired ShorePoint Health Port Charlotte from Community Health Systems on March 1, 2025
	AdventHealth Porter	Denver	Colorado	✓	Aeronautical chart and airport information for 69CO at SkyVector	Adventist Health System Sunbelt Healthcare Corporation acquired Porter Adventist Hospital, when PorterCare Adventist Health System merged on October 1, 2001. Porter Adventist Hospital rebranded to its current name on August 1, 2023, after Centura Health split up.
	AdventHealth Redmond‡	Rome	Georgia	✓	Aeronautical chart and airport information for GA12 at SkyVector	AdventHealth acquired Redmond Regional Medical Center from HCA Healthcare on October 1, 2021.
	AdventHealth Riverview***	Riverview	Florida	✓	Aeronautical chart and airport information for 26FA at SkyVector	Original hospital that opened October 23, 2024
	AdventHealth Rollins Brook	Lampasas	Texas	✓		Formerly named Rollins Brooks Community Hospital
	AdventHealth Sebring***	Sebring	Florida	✓	Aeronautical chart and airport information for FA52 at SkyVector	An original hospital that opened in 1948.
	AdventHealth Shawnee Mission	Merriam	Kansas	✓	Aeronautical chart and airport information for 9KS2 at SkyVector	Adventist Health System acquired Shawnee Mission Medical Center in 2002.
	AdventHealth South Overland Park	Overland Park	Kansas	✓	Yes	Original hospital that opened October 7, 2021
	AdventHealth Tampa***	Tampa	Florida	✓	Aeronautical chart and airport information for 3FA1 at SkyVector	Adventist Health System acquired University Community Hospital, when University Community Health merged on September 1, 2010. In late September 2011, it was rebranded to Florida Hospital Carrollwood.
	AdventHealth Waterman**	Tavares	Florida	✓	Aeronautical chart and airport information for 32FL at SkyVector	Formerly named Florida Hospital Waterman
	AdventHealth Wauchula***	Wauchula	Florida	✓		Formerly named Florida Hospital Wauchula
	AdventHealth Weaverville	Weaverville	North Carolina			Currently under construction.
	AdventHealth Wesley Chapel***	Wesley Chapel	Florida	✓	Aeronautical chart and airport information for 27FL at SkyVector	Formerly named Florida Hospital Wesley Chapel
	AdventHealth Winter Garden*	Winter Garden	Florida	✓	Aeronautical chart and airport information for FA00 at SkyVector	Original hospital that opened May 3, 2022
	AdventHealth Winter Haven***	Winter Haven	Florida		Aeronautical chart and airport information for 1FD9 at SkyVector	To be built in future
	AdventHealth Winter Park*	Winter Park	Florida	✓		Florida Hospital acquired Winter Park Memorial Hospital in early July 2000.
	AdventHealth Zephyrhills***	Zephyrhills	Florida	✓	Aeronautical chart and airport information for FD75 at SkyVector	Adventist Health System acquired Jackson Memorial Hospital from Pasco County in 1981. In January 1985, it was moved to Zephyrhills and was renamed East Pasco Medical Center.
	Texas Health Huguley Hospital Fort Worth South	Burleson	Texas	✓	Aeronautical chart and airport information for 56XA at SkyVector	The hospital is a joint venture between AdventHealth and Texas Health Resources, it was formerly named Huguley Memorial Medical Center
	Texas Health Hospital Mansfield	Mansfield	Texas	✓	Aeronautical chart and airport information for XA64 at SkyVector	The hospital is a joint venture between AdventHealth and Texas Health Resources, it opened December 1, 2020.
	UChicago Medicine AdventHealth Bolingbrook	Bolingbrook	Illinois	✓	Aeronautical chart and airport information for 45IS at SkyVector	Adventist Bolingbrook Hospital was one of the original hospitals that opened January 12, 2008. It was also named AMITA Health Adventist Medical Center Bolingbrook and AdventHealth Bolingbrook.
	UChicago Medicine AdventHealth GlenOaks	Glendale Heights	Illinois	✓	Aeronautical chart and airport information for IS09 at SkyVector	Formerly named AMITA Health Adventist Medical Center GlenOaks and AdventHealth GlenOaks
	UChicago Medicine AdventHealth Hinsdale	Hinsdale	Illinois	✓	Aeronautical chart and airport information for 1IL2 at SkyVector	Formerly named AMITA Health Adventist Medical Center Hinsdale and AdventHealth Hinsdale
	UChicago Medicine AdventHealth La Grange	La Grange	Illinois	✓	Aeronautical chart and airport information for 18IL at SkyVector	Adventist Health System acquired La Grange Memorial Hospital from Columbia/HCA Healthcare in September 1998, and soon after renamed it Adventist La Grange Memorial. It was also named AMITA Health Adventist Medical Center La Grange and AdventHealth La Grange.

== See also ==
- Florida Hospital Oceanside
- ShorePoint Health Punta Gorda
- List of Seventh-day Adventist hospitals
- List of hospitals in Florida
