= AdventHealth Parker =

Hospital in Colorado, US

- AdventHealth
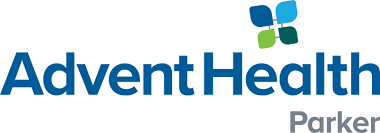

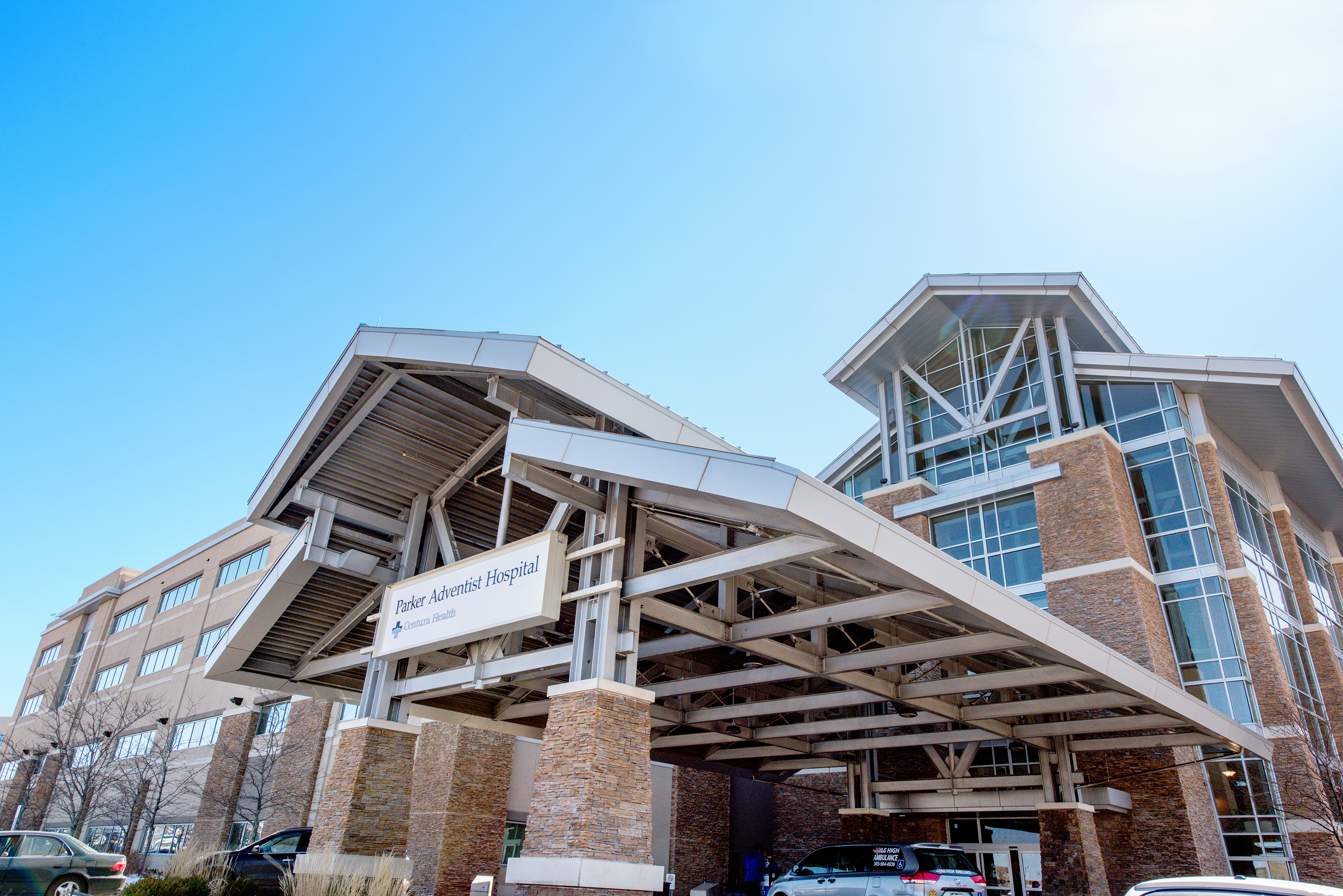
- Parker Adventist Hospital in 2015, before rebranding in 2023 to AdventHealth Parker

Geography
- Location: 9395 Crown Crest Boulevard, Parker, Colorado, United States
- Coordinates: 39.54813°N 104.77084°W

Organization
- Care system: Private hospital
- Type: General hospital
- Religious affiliation: Seventh-day Adventist Church

Services
- Standards: Joint Commission
- Emergency department: Level II trauma center
- Beds: 179

Helipads
- Helipad: Aeronautical chart and airport information for CD31 at SkyVector

History
- Former name: Parker Adventist Hospital
- Opened: February 3, 2004; 22 years ago

Links
- Website: www.adventhealth.com/hospital/adventhealth-parker
- Lists: Hospitals in Colorado

Portercare Adventist Health System (doing business as AdventHealth Parker) is a non-profit hospital campus in Parker, Colorado, United States owned by AdventHealth. The medical facility is a tertiary that has multiple specialties. It is designated a Level II trauma center by the Colorado Department of Public Health and Environment.

== History ==
=== 2001-2011 ===
In September 2001, Centura Health purchased 40 acres (16 ha) for $12 million by E-470 and Colorado State Highway 83 for a new hospital.

Centura Health hired HKS, Inc. to design the hospital; and GE Johnson Construction Company from Colorado Springs, Colorado and Kitchell Construction from Phoenix, Arizona to build it.

Construction for Parker Adventist Hospital began in the summer of 2002. On March 5, 2003, there was a topping out of Parker Adventist Hospital.

On February 3, 2004, Parker Adventist Hospital opened with 58 beds, the 210,000 square foot (20,000 m^{2}) hospital was built for $108 million. It also included an attached 80,000 square foot (7,400 m^{2}) medical office building. It became the second hospital in Douglas County, the first was Sky Ridge Medical Center.

In February 2005, the hospital began expanding onto the second floor that was shelled space for $7.5 million. It will have one operating theater, thirty-five beds and a unit named the Chest Pain Center. In late November, the second floor at the hospital opened. In January 2009, GE Johnson Construction Company began a two phase expansion and renovation project at Parker Adventist Hospital for $76 million, to increasing the size of the hospital from 210,000 square foot (20,000 m^{2}) to 340,000 square foot (32,000 m^{2}). The first phase would be adding five operating theatres, ten birth rooms; and more space for a post-anesthesia care unit, pre-operation area and sterile processing department. The second phase would be adding a three-story inpatient tower with sixty beds, an intensive care unit, a sleep center and more parking. The expansion was to be finished in 2011, increasing the number of beds for the hospital from 100 to 160.

=== 2017-present ===
In late 2017, the Colorado Senate passed a law requiring all hospitals to have their chargemaster on its website by January 1, 2018. The Centers for Medicare & Medicaid Services also required all hospitals to do the same by January 1, 2021. In early August 2022, Parker Adventist Hospital still had refused to comply. To force hospitals to comply the Colorado House of Representatives and Colorado Senate both passed laws forbidding hospitals from collecting debt by reporting patients to collection agencies.

In late January 2020, Vertix Builders began construction of a four-story, 86,000 square foot (8,000 m^{2}) medical office building. In late May 2021, the Peak Medical Office Building was completed for $25 million. On February 14, 2023, Centura Health announced that it would split up. On August 1, Centura Health split up with Parker Adventist Hospital rebranding to AdventHealth Parker. By early February 2024, the hospital had 530,000 patients visit the emergency department, it delivered 32,000 babies, and performed 125,000 surgeries.

On January 7, 2025, there was a groundbreaking for a 186,000 square foot (17,300 m^{2}) seven story tower on the hospitals southside for $300 million. AdventHealth Parker had hired Boulder Associates and SmithGroup to design the tower; and DPR Construction to build it. In February, construction was to begin on the tower. It will have four operating theatres, with two shelled rooms, sixteen pre-and post-operative rooms, sixty hospital beds, two cardiac catheterization labs, two interventional radiology labs and a sterile processing department. The fifth, sixth and seventh floors will be shelled space and will later become patient floors. Once the tower is complete at AdventHealth Parker it will be adding 100 jobs to the 1,100 that it already has.

In early February 2025, nurses at the hospital received training to recognize and support victims of human trafficking, from the Castle Rock, Colorado non-profit organization From Silenced to Saved. In early May 2026, AdventHealth Parker purchased 44 acres (18 ha) adjacent to its campus for $16.5 million from Bowey Family Partnership LLLP.

== Fentanyl theft ==
On June 25, 2019, nurse Jessica Sharman plead guilty in United States District Court for the District of Colorado for stealing fentanyl from the intensive care unit at the hospital. On November 13, she was sentenced to three years and eight months in prison.

== Services ==
In March 2019, the hospital became the first medical facility to use a facial recognition system, to reduce mistakes while treating patients with cancer.

== Partnership ==
Before the hospital opened it signed a partnership with Children's Hospital Colorado to have it treat pediatrics in a leased attached space. From early April 2023 to early September 2024, Children's Hospital Colorado leased the third floor of the Sierra Medical Office Building for an urgent care center.

== Awards and recognitions ==
AdventHealth Parker received from the Centers for Medicare & Medicaid Services a five-star rating from 2020 to 2021, and again from 2023 to 2024.

== See also ==
- List of Seventh-day Adventist hospitals
- List of trauma centers in the United States
