= AdventHealth North Pinellas =

Hospital in Tarpon Springs, Florida

- AdventHealth

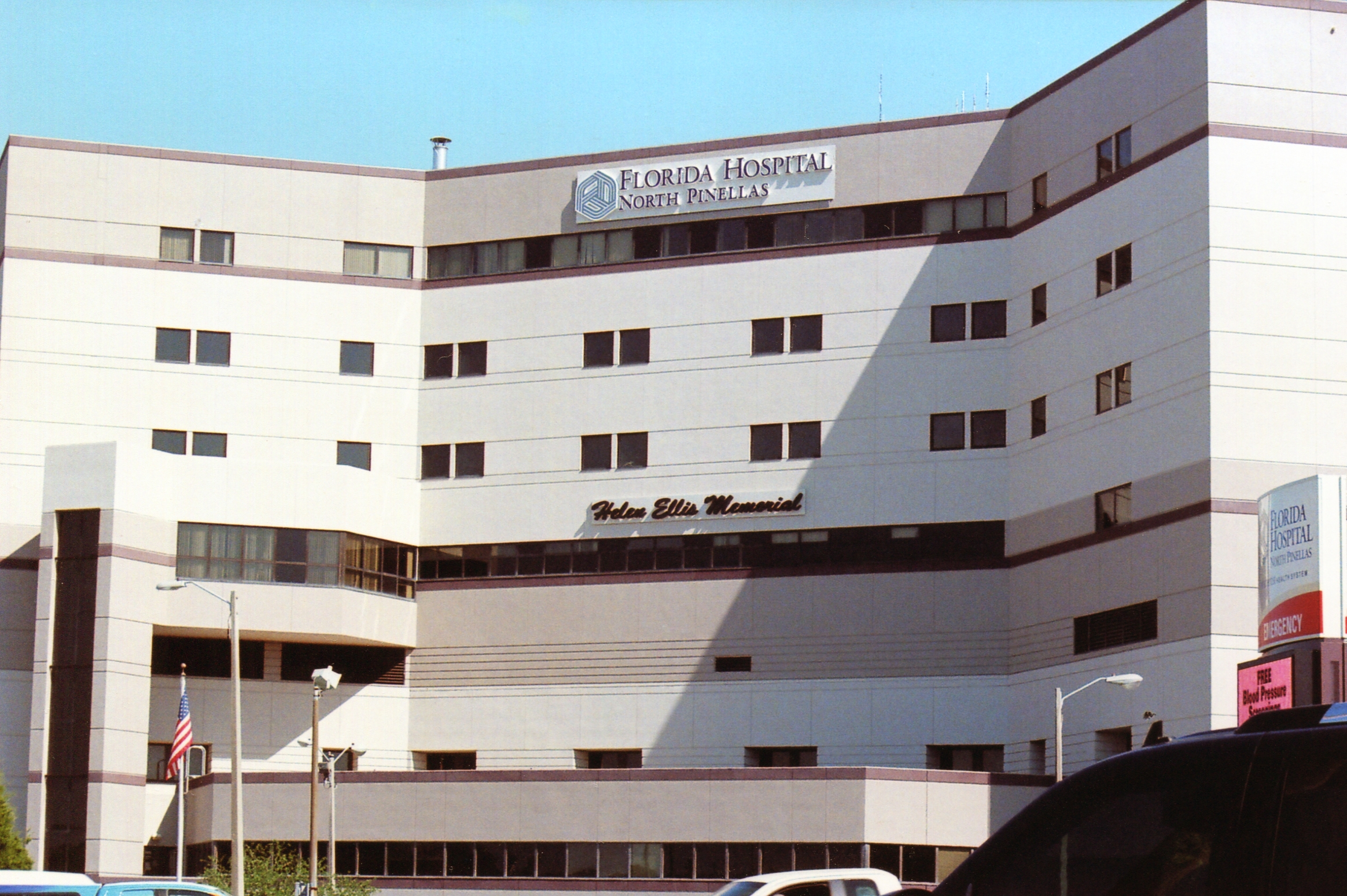
- Florida Hospital North Pinellas in 2013, before it rebranded in 2019 to AdventHealth North Pinellas

Geography
- Location: 1395 South Pinellas Avenue, Tarpon Springs, Florida, United States
- Coordinates: 28.1326°N 82.7586°W

Organization
- Care system: Private hospital
- Type: Community hospital/General hospital
- Religious affiliation: Seventh-day Adventist Church

Services
- Standards: Joint Commission
- Emergency department: Yes
- Beds: 168

Helipads
- Helipad: Aeronautical chart and airport information for FA58 at SkyVector

History
- Former names: Tarpon Springs Memorial Hospital; Tarpon Springs General Hospital; Helen Ellis Hospital; Helen Ellis Memorial Hospital; Florida Hospital North Pinellas
- Constructed: 1927
- Opened: 1927

Links
- Website: www.adventhealth.com/hospital/adventhealth-north-pinellas
- Lists: Hospitals in Florida

Tarpon Springs Hospital Foundation, Inc. (doing business as AdventHealth North Pinellas) is a non-profit hospital campus in Tarpon Springs, Florida, United States. It became part of the AdventHealth hospital network following a merger with University Community Health in September 2010. The medical facility is a tertiary and primary stroke center that has multiple specialties.

In the 1990s, there was a feud over the hospital between Tarpon Springs and the Tarpon Springs Hospital Foundation. Before merging the hospital had been in debt and owed over $31 million, due to this Standard & Poor's gave it a "junk bond level". AdventHealth North Pinellas has been evacuated four times due to hurricanes since 2017.

== History ==
=== 1927-1950s ===
In 1927, Tarpon Springs had Tarpon Springs Memorial Hospital built on land owned by the city for $25,000 in bonds. It had 12 beds and was two stories tall. In the 1930s, the hospital made up 10 percent of the city budget. In 1939, Tarpon Springs was close to bankruptcy and the city commission government took a vote to close Tarpon Springs Memorial Hospital. A few days later a married couple convinced the city commission government to lease the hospital to them. After it expired other residents kept the hospital open.

In 1946, the Tarpon Springs Hospital Association was formed by the city manager and physicians. Tarpon Springs canceled the lease of the association after physicians failed to keep the hospital open. In 1947, the hospital changed its name from Tarpon Springs Memorial Hospital to Tarpon Springs General Hospital. The same year the association renamed itself the Tarpon Springs Hospital Foundation. The by-laws of the foundation were written by the city. The members of the foundation were leaders of local civic, fraternity and religious organizations. The foundation also included Tarpon Springs leaders, two former city commissioners and one former city manager who were part of the foundations board of directors. Before the foundation leased the hospital for a second time, the city commission government tried to save it by signing an emergency lease with a local resident.

Beginning in 1947, the foundation started paying a 5-year lease for $1 with Tarpon Springs, while the city maintained the hospital and paid its utility bills worth a total of $3,000 to $12,000 a year. In the 1950s, the foundation created a bank account for hospital revenues and took over the management of the hospital from Tarpon Springs. The city purchased for Tarpon Springs General Hospital typewriters, mattresses and cardiac monitors. And also continued to give the hospital money for its budget.

=== 1960-1988 ===
In 1960, the foundation took plans to the city commission government for a new 50-bed hospital (later it was increased to 67-beds). It supported the plan to build a new hospital, some residents were angry about the city spending more money on the hospital, yet they supported in a referendum to issue $390,000 in bonds for the project in December 1963. In 1965, the foundation hired the hospital's first administrator to make it self-sustaining. In 1966, a new hospital was built on the site of the old one for $1,249,000. A federal grant contributed $850,000 towards the construction of the new hospital. In 1968, the foundation agreed to pay the hospital's water and sewer bills, it also asked Tarpon Springs to put in a lawn sprinkling system for $1,750.

In 1972, construction workers expanded the hospital to 111 beds at a cost of $775,000. The expansion was paid for with a federal grant and a loan of $400,000 from a local bank to Tarpon Springs.

In 1981, the city created the Tarpon Springs Health Facilities Authority to issue bonds to the hospital and to lease it to the Tarpon Springs Hospital Foundation. In 1982, the Health Facilities Authority issued bonds worth $10.6 million to the hospital, for another expansion which the foundation paid back over 30 years with hospital revenues. The foundation also paid off other debts that Tarpon Springs had from earlier hospital projects. In 1988, it was renamed Helen Ellis Hospital after hospital volunteer Helen Ellis. In 1989, after her death it changed to Helen Ellis Memorial Hospital.

=== 1991-1994 ===
In 1991, the Health Facilities Authority issued bonds worth $15 million to the hospital, to increase the number beds to 150 and add four more stories to the already four story building. In early December 1994, Helen Ellis Memorial Hospital announced that it signed a letter to become a partner with Columbia/HCA Healthcare Corporation. It was chosen after looking at seven other hospital networks. At a meeting with Tarpon Springs officials the mayor was skeptical of the partnership as well as one city commissioner. While one city commissioner was enthusiastic about it. It would have to go before voters in a special referendum to decide if it would join the hospital network.

=== 1995 ===
In late January, at a special meeting with the city commission government some residents of Tarpon Springs were not persuaded of the partnership with Columbia/HCA Healthcare Corporation . While other residents and commissioners needed more information before deciding. In early April, the city commission government terminated the partnership that Helen Ellis Memorial Hospital wanted with Columbia/HCA Healthcare Corporation with a 4-to-1 vote. By doing so there was no special referendum for voters. Missing at the meeting were administrators from the hospital network, the foundation's board members and the lawyers for both organizations. The hospital was told to look somewhere else for a partner. An audience of 60 people praised the decision. The reason why the city commission government terminated the partnership was, because they preferred Helen Ellis Memorial Hospital to be part of a not-for-profit instead of a for-profit corporate giant. They questioned the finances and management/ownership of the hospital. And it also was unhappy that it was not provided sufficient information from the organizations. Tarpon Springs spent $137,000 to terminate the partnership that Helen Ellis Memorial Hospital wanted with Columbia/HCA Healthcare Corporation, while the Tarpon Springs Hospital Foundation spent $449,000 to make it happen.

In early September, Tarpon Springs threatened to raise taxes or dissolve the Tarpon Springs Police Department, if residents did not vote yes to the referendum to be held in early November of that year. In late September, the hospital board members decided not to challenge the city commission government, which planned to ask voters if Tarpon Springs should sell Helen Ellis Memorial Hospital. The hospital board members instead decided that they would have a campaign to convince voters to reject the sale. In early October, the hospital put 30-second ads on television and radio. Also ads were put in the local newspaper and direct mailing was done. In early November, the following hospital networks that were interested in purchasing Helen Ellis Memorial Hospital were: Adventist Health System, Bon Secours Health System, Columbia/HCA Healthcare, Health Management Associates, Morton Plant Mease Health Care, OrNda Healthcorp, Tampa General Healthcare, Tenet Healthcare and Universal Health Services In early November, voters rejected a proposal at a referendum to sell Helen Ellis Memorial Hospital to a hospital network.

=== 1998-1999 ===
In early March, 1998, there was a controversial referendum to amend the city charter to make it more clear the relationship between Tarpon Springs and the Tarpon Springs Hospital Foundation. Before the referendum Tarpon Springs put neutral advertisements in the North Pinellas Times for a month and then later advertisements asking residents to vote yes. All total the city spent $428,000. The Hospital Springs Hospital Foundation bought television advertisements that were shown on local cable stations, it also put advertisements in the North Pinellas Times. In the advertisements asking residents to vote no. All total the city spent $1.2 million. Its reason that the referendum would give Tarpon Springs control of Helen Ellis Memorial Hospital. At a city commission government meeting the mayor denied that the city wanted to take over the hospital and considered the advertisements by the foundation to be misleading. While the city manager considered them to be false.

In January 1999, Standard & Poor's lowered the bond rating of Helen Ellis Memorial Hospital by three grades to BBB− which is a "junk" bond level. This happened after five consecutive poor financial quarters. The rating agency believed that the hospital would not be able to repay its debt of $31 million back. In late March 1999, at its annual meeting, the Tarpon Springs Hospital Foundation announced that the hospital made a surplus of $720,000. The hospital did this by cutting spending and by treating more patients. In early June, at a meeting the city commissioner, the chairperson of the Health Facilities Authority and the hospital administrator agreed for the hospital to survive it must have an affiliate. They preferred it becoming part of a non-profit to reduce its debt. In early July, the debt of Helen Ellis Memorial Hospital had been reduced to $28 million. And the hospital networks Adventist Health System, Columbia/HCA Healthcare and Health Management Associates were still interested in the hospital.

In early August 1999, Helen Ellis Memorial Hospital announced that it that it had contacted 25 non-profit hospital networks for a merger or a joint venture. Only three responded to the struggling hospital. The partners Adventist Health System and University Community Hospital. Also Morton Plant Mease Health Care and the third to respond was Tampa General Hospital. In late October, at a meeting with the city commissioner government the Tarpon Springs Hospital Foundation introduced Choice Health Alliance to manage Helen Ellis Memorial Hospital. Choice Health Alliance is a partnership between University Community Hospital and Adventist Health System. In early November, the city commission government supported leasing Helen Ellis Memorial Hospital to Choice Health Alliance for thirty years. Hospital employees and board members of the foundation praised the decision. In a referendum voters would decide on the lease to Choice Health Alliance.

=== 2000 ===
In early February, the lawyers of Choice Health Alliance and the city lawyer both submitted paperwork to Tarpon Springs for a forty year lease. In late March, some on the city commission government were alarmed by the slow negotiating with Choice Health Alliance, they were afraid that it could cause Helen Ellis Memorial Hospital to close.

In late March, Helen Ellis Memorial Hospital announced that it would affiliate with University Community Hospital. University Community Hospital would pay $24 million to pay off the 1988 and 1991 bonds of the hospital. And it would lease Helen Ellis Memorial Hospital for $250,000 a year. Choice Health Alliance had wanted to refinance the bonds of Helen Ellis Memorial Hospital. After the rising interest rates of bonds Choice Health Alliance and Adventist Health System were dropped as partners. Before Choice Health Alliance was dropped there had been rumors that the partnership had soured.

In late April, paying off the debt of Helen Ellis Memorial Hospital had changed. University Community Hospital would pay $20 million and would loan $4.2 million to the struggling hospital. Another $3.4 million would come from a reserve fund created by the Tarpon Springs Hospital Foundation. It was also announced that the Tarpon Springs Hospital Foundation would be made up off 12 board members, six chosen by University Community Hospital. One of them would be the chief executive officer of University Community Hospital. The other six would be made up of one medical employee from Helen Ellis Memorial Hospital and five residents from Tarpon Springs or the surrounding communities. Some members of the city commission government were concerned about the agreement between University Community Hospital and Tarpon Spring Hospital Foundation.

In early June, the city commission government supported leasing Helen Ellis Memorial to University Community Hospital for 40 years. In a referendum voters would decide on the 40-year lease to University Community Hospital. Employees at Helen Ellis Memorial Hospital overwhelmingly supported the referendum as a way to save their struggling hospital. Before the referendum the Tarpon Springs Hospital Foundation had signs put across the city on lawns, including a large "Vote Yes" sign in front of Helen Ellis Memorial Hospital. They also purchased newspaper advertisements, sent out direct mailings and made telephone calls. All total they spent $15,000. In early July, voters overwhelmingly approved the 40-year lease of the hospital to University Community Hospital by a 9-to-1 ratio. On September 1, University Community Hospital took over the management of Helen Ellis Memorial Hospital.

=== 2003-2008 ===
In early October 2003, Helen Ellis Memorial Hospital wanted to sell a walk-in clinic which it owned in Holiday, Florida on U.S. Route 19. The clinic was in debt from 2001 to 2002, which forced it to close in September 2003. When the hospital asked the city commission government if they could sell the clinic they were told that they might have to get voter approval to sell. In 2004, the Tarpon Springs Hospital Foundation wanted to sell five lots that were donated to it by donors, these lots were not next to the hospital. The foundation wanted to sell the five lots to pay off the debt that was owned by the hospital. In early March 2004, at 8:00PM a fire start in a second floor laboratory at Helen Ellis Memorial Hospital. Sixty firefighters responded to the fire at the hospital. It forced the evacuation of several patients and it caused $100,000 in damage. At first the fire was blamed on equipment and later a match.

In early March 2008, the Tarpon Springs Hospital Foundation and Tarpon Springs both wanted to sell land by Helen Ellis Memorial Hospital to developer AG Armstrong. To sell the land owned by the city the lease for hospital would have to be changed. The 2.2 acres (0.89 ha) would then be added to the 7.2 acres (2.9 ha) already owned by AG Armstrong. AG Armstrong planned on building apartments or condominiums, a shopping center with a Sweetbay Supermarket, a medical office building, a parking garage to be shared with the hospital and assisted living. Also Tarpon Springs wanted to sell a medical office building in Pasco County, Florida. In a referendum voters would decide on selling the land by Helen Ellis Memorial Hospital and selling the medical office building in Pasco County. In early March 2008, voters approved the sale of the land by Helen Ellis Memorial Hospital by 1,960 to 505.

=== 2010-2013 ===
In 2010, Helen Ellis Memorial Hospital was $9.5 million in debt. On September 1, the hospital became part of Adventist Health System. This happened after University Community Health merged with Adventist Health System. After acquiring the hospital Adventist Health System made over $45 million in upgrades. In late July, AG Armstrong changed its mind about building the parking garage due to the economy and instead decided to due a parking lot. This forced a referendum on the land owned by the Tarpon Springs Hospital Foundation again in late January 2012.

In late February 2012, it was suggested to the city commission government that the name should be changed to Florida Hospital North Pinellas. It was believed that the name change would help with marketing. That same year Adventist Health System hired a consultant over renaming the hospital. The consultant met with the hospitals foundation, its employees and with area residents. It was overwhelmly agreed that the name had to change. In early March, the city commission government gave permission to rename Helen Ellis Memorial Hospital to Florida Hospital North Pinellas. The name Helen Ellis Memorial remained on the outside of the hospital, after it changed its name to Florida Hospital North Pinellas. Inside of the hospital the Ellis family name is on a wall in the lobby and the board room was renamed A. L. Ellis Board Room. The Ellis family has given millions to the hospital.

On November 7, 2013, hospital physicians performed surgeries for the first time with the da Vinci Surgical System. Raj Kotak performed a laparoscopic cholecystectomy, Lourdes Santiago performed a laparoscopic sigmoid colon resection rectopexy, Keith Gregory Chisholm performed the first laparoscopic single-site cholecystectomy and Parveen Vahora performed a laparoscopic supracervical hysterectomy.

=== 2018-present ===
In early August 2018, an official from Adventist Health System met with the city commission government of Tarpon Springs asking to extend the lease of the hospital from 2040 to 2070. The city commission government supported extending the lease of the hospital. And four days later it voted 4-0 in support of the extension. In a referendum voters would decide to extend the lease from 2040 to 2070. If the referendum is approved the hospital would pay the city $3 million. Despite the concerns of former members of the city commission.

On January 2, 2019, Florida Hospital North Pinellas rebranded to AdventHealth North Pinellas. On January 3, Raj Kotak used the da Vinci Xi for the first time to perform a cholecystectomy. In early August, AdventHealth North Pinellas had a groundbreaking ceremony for a new bigger emergency department, to replace its smaller 6,000 square foot (560 m^{2}) emergency department which was built in the 1980s. The cost of the new emergency would be $18.5 million (later grew to $20 million), it would be 14,000 square foot (1,300 m^{2}) and have 18 private patient rooms, negative pressure room and an ambulance bay separate from the main entrance. The hospital also had $20 million in renovations done to its laboratory, lobby and exterior façade to make it resistant to a Category 4 hurricane. On the last day in August 2021, the new emergency department opened at AdventHealth North Pinellas. The opening of the new emergency department was delayed due to the COVID-19 pandemic.

On January 1, 2021, all hospitals were required to have their chargemaster on its website by the Centers for Medicare & Medicaid Services. In a survey done in 2022, the majority of hospitals in Florida including AdventHealth North Pinellas had failed to comply with the Hospital Price Transparency Law. It was not until early February 2023, that the hospital was in full compliance with the law.

== Feud and aftermath ==
Since 1994, Tarpon Springs has been unhappy with the foundation for trying to surreptitiously partner with Columbia/HCA Healthcare Corporation without consulting the community.

In early July 1995, the Tarpon Springs Ministerial Association intervened between the two feuding parties, as neither party was communicating with the other. A three question referendum which was scheduled for July 25 was cancelled. If it would have taken place the voters had a choice to sell Helen Ellis Memorial Hospital to the foundation, sell it to a non-profit hospital network or to have the city file a legal action against the foundation.

In late October 1995, the Tarpon Springs Hospital Foundation sued the city, in response to a letter from the city attorney instructing the foundation to pay the city $12,000 within 30 days to cover the city's legal fees against the Health Facilities Authority (as paying these fees was a part of the lease agreement between the city and the foundation), or face eviction from the Helen Ellis Memorial Hospital. The lawsuit filed by the foundation also asked the court to mediate on disputed parts of the lease, and to prevent future intervention by the city until the scheduled expiration of the lease agreement in 2021. Tarpon Springs subsequently counter-sued the Tarpon Springs Hospital Foundation, seeking to gain further leverage over the hospital by cancelling the current lease agreement. The foundation also sued the Health Facilities Authority when it intervened to try forcing the hospital to pay these fees, and the Health Facilities Authority also counter-sued the foundation in return. The city and the Health Facilities Authority asked to have the lawsuits dismissed, but the sixth circuit court Judge Crocket Farnell rejected their request.

In late October 1996, Judge Crocket Farnell ruled in favour of the foundation, denying the city's request for the Tarpon Springs Hospital Foundation to pay the disputed $12,000 fee

In October 1997, the city asked the Florida Attorney General for their opinion on the ongoing feud. He agreed with the city's request for the hospital's records and meetings to be made open to the public. The St. Petersburg Times subsequently tried to obtain the hospital's records, however, the foundation responded by suing the Florida Attorney General and the St. Petersburg Times.

By early February 1998, the attorney fees for the three parties were: Tarpon Springs Hospital Foundation $1,256,000; Health Facilities Authority $100,000 and Tarpon Springs $428,081. Also in early February, the city and the hospital foundation had a meeting over a document that the foundation had given to the city in early December. In it the foundation had three requests that it should be permitted to continue operating Helen Ellis Memorial Hospital in secret, that it wanted the lease to be extended for another sixteen years and that they wanted the city to ask the state attorney general to change his opinion. Also Helen Ellis Memorial Hospital wanted land east of the building.

In early June 1998, Judge Crocket Farnell ruled against the foundation, ordering it to obey the Florida Public Records Law and the Florida Sunshine Law. He also ordered the foundation to pay the Health Facilities Authority's attorney fees, which had increased to $200,000. He also ruled that the foundation had to pay the $28 million bonds that it owed to the Health Facilities Authority. The judge also supported the city's original demand for the foundation to pay the city within 30 days, or face eviction. The city government and the Health Facilities Authority both praised the judge's decision.

In early June 1998, the Tarpon Springs Hospital Foundation appealed the ruling, stating that the judge overlooked a new state law on "public hospitals". Both the city and the Health Facilities Authority responded by filing motions claiming that Helen Ellis Memorial Hospital is not a public hospital, and that the ruling should be upheld. The state law in question only passed two days before the verdict was announced, so the judge was unaware of it. In early September 1998, the judge heard the appeals from the involved parties, and, by the end of the month, he reversed his prior decision, due to the new law, ruling in favour of the hospital foundation. The city and the hospital both accepted this verdict, and the feud ended; at a total cost of $4 million in attorney fees.

In early May 1999, a Leon County, Florida judge denied the St. Petersburg Times request to see Helen Ellis Memorial Hospital's records.

== Community work ==
From 1993 to 2012, the hospital had a partnership with The Tarpon Springs Shepherd Center to provide Thanksgiving and Christmas meals to the poor.

== Hurricane evacuations ==
On September 9, 2017, Florida Hospital North Pinellas was evacuated due to Hurricane Irma, and it moved patients by ambulance to Florida Hospital Wesley Chapel and Florida Hospital Zephyrhills. On September 27, 2022, AdventHealth Pinellas was evacuated due to Hurricane Ian. It moved 51 patients by ambulance to AdventHealth Tampa, and 23 other patients were relocated to AdventHealth nursing homes in Pasco County and Pinellas County. On August 9, 2023, the hospital was evacuated due to Hurricane Idalia, and it moved 60 patients by ambulance to other AdventHealth hospitals. On October 8, 2024, the hospital was evacuated due to Hurricane Milton, and it moved 40 patients by ambulance to other AdventHealth hospitals.

== Awards and recognitions ==
In late November 2012, Florida Hospital North Pinellas received the "Large Business of the Year" award from the Tarpon Springs Chamber of Commerce. In December, the hospital received the HIMSS Analytics Stage 7 Award for its electronic health record. It was the second hospital in Florida to win this award, following Florida Hospital Flagler. In June 2013, the medical facility received the Healthcare Advertising Awards silver award for its "I Choose" advertising campaign.

=== The Leapfrog Group ===
The hospital received a grade A from The Leapfrog Group in fall 2013, 2014, 2015, 2016, 2017, April 2018. And received it again in 2019, 2020, 2021, 2022, 2023. And again in November 2024, 2025, and 2026.

AdventHealth North Pinellas was recognized by the group as a top general hospital from 2019 to 2020.

== Notable patients ==
- On October 30, 1995, Alpheus Ellis, a banker and philanthropist, died of a heart attack after surgery.
- On January 26, 2024, Jimy Williams, the former manager of the Toronto Blue Jays, Boston Red Sox, and Houston Astros, died from a short illness.

== See also ==
- List of Seventh-day Adventist hospitals
- List of stroke centers in the United States
