= AdventHealth Castle Rock =

Hospital in Colorado, US

- AdventHealth

Geography
- Location: 2350 Meadows Boulevard, Castle Rock, Colorado, United States
- Coordinates: 39.4051°N 104.8845°W

Organization
- Care system: Private hospital
- Type: General hospital
- Religious affiliation: Seventh-day Adventist Church

Services
- Standards: Joint Commission
- Emergency department: Level III trauma center
- Beds: 90

Helipads
- Helipad: Aeronautical chart and airport information for 50CO at SkyVector

History
- Former name: Castle Rock Adventist Hospital
- Opened: August 1, 2013

Links
- Website: www.adventhealth.com/hospital/adventhealth-castle-rock
- Lists: Hospitals in Colorado

Portercare Adventist Health System (doing business as AdventHealth Castle Rock) is a non-profit hospital campus in Castle Rock, Colorado, United States owned by AdventHealth. The hospital is designated a Level III trauma center by the Colorado Department of Public Health and Environment.

== History ==
In early October 2007, Centura Health purchased 50 acres (20 ha) from Castle Rock Development Company in Castle Rock, Colorado, in the development of The Meadows.

In 2010, HuntonBrady Architects was hired to design an emergency department and later in 2013 a hospital and GE Johnson Construction Company was hired to build the campus. In August 2010, construction began on a 20,000 square foot (1,900 m^{2}) emergency department and a 40,000 square foot (3,700 m^{2}) medical office building for $23.6 million. On July 26, 2011, construction began on a 212,000 square foot (19,700 m^{2}) four-story hospital with 50 beds, Adventist Health System provided $128 million to have it built. On September 7, the emergency department opened. On August 1, 2013, Castle Rock Adventist Hospital and its medical office building opened. On April 11, 2016, Angel Paws therapy dogs began visiting patients at the hospital.

In late 2017, the Colorado Senate passed a law requiring all hospitals to have their chargemaster on its website by January 1, 2018. The Centers for Medicare & Medicaid Services also required all hospitals to do the same by January 1, 2021. In early August 2022, Castle Rock Adventist Hospital still had refused to comply. To force hospitals to comply the Colorado House of Representatives and Colorado Senate both passed laws forbidding hospitals from collecting debt by reporting patients to collection agencies.

In 2021, Castle Rock Adventist Hospital had 36 beds added onto its fourth floor. On February 14, 2023, Centura Health announced that it would split up. On August 1, Centura Health split up with Castle Rock Adventist Hospital rebranding to AdventHealth Castle Rock.

On June 20, 2024, AdventHealth Castle Rock changed the name of the Palmer Building to the Schrader Building, it did this after a local couple donated $5 million for a cancer center. In late January 2025, the Douglas County Commissioners approved a $1 million grant to the AdventHealth Rocky Mountain Foundation, for a Vision RT radiation therapy system at AdventHealth Castle Rock. On February 23, 2026, the hospital opened its cancer center.

== Manna foodservice ==
When Castle Rock Adventist Hospital opened instead of having a cafeteria, it has a restaurant named Manna Restaurant, a convenience store named Manna Market, and Bedside Manna for the hospital patients. In 2015, 75% percent of the business comes only from people who visit the fine dining restaurant. Manna has its own vegetable garden on the hospital's campus.

== Awards and recognitions ==
The hospital received a grade A from The Leapfrog Group from fall 2024 to May 2026. The medical facility was recognized by the non-profit organization from 2020 to 2021.

AdventHealth Castle Rock received from the Centers for Medicare & Medicaid Services a five-star rating from 2022 to 2023.

== See also ==
- List of Seventh-day Adventist hospitals
