= AdventHealth Tampa =

- AdventHealth

Geography
- Location: East Fletcher Avenue, Tampa, Florida, United States
- Coordinates: 28°4′16.000″N 82°25′24.305″W

Organization
- Care system: Private hospital
- Type: General hospital and Teaching hospital
- Religious affiliation: Seventh-day Adventist Church

Services
- Standards: DNV Healthcare
- Emergency department: Yes
- Beds: 626

Helipads
- Helipad: Aeronautical chart and airport information for 3FA1 at SkyVector

History
- Former names: University Community Hospital; Florida Hospital Tampa

Links
- Website: www.adventhealth.com/hospital/adventhealth-tampa
- Lists: Hospitals in Florida

University Community Hospital, Inc. (doing business as AdventHealth Tampa) is a non-profit hospital campus in Tampa, Florida, United States. It became part of AdventHealth following a merger with University Community Health in September 2010. The medical facility is a tertiary, teaching hospital and comprehensive stroke center that has multiple specialties.

In 1995, University Community Hospital had multiple medical errors, that led it to be investigated by the Agency for Health Care Administration and Health Care Finance Administration. In 2015, a murder-suicide took place at the hospital, between a man and his stepdaughter.

== History ==
=== 1993-1998 ===
In early July 1993, University Community Hospital agreed to purchase Centurion Hospital of Carrollwood from Centurion Health of Carrollwood for $17.4 million. The sale had to be approved by creditors and the United States bankruptcy court. In early November, University Community Hospital officially took over the management of Centurion Hospital of Carrollwood and renamed it to University Community Hospital-Carrollwood.

In late April 1998, the board of University Community Hospital unanimously approved to create a joint venture with Adventist Health System. The new company included the hospitals University Community Hospital, University Community Hospital-Carrollwood and East Pasco Medical Center in Zephyrhills.

=== 2000-present ===
On September 1, 2000, University Community Hospital took over the management of Helen Ellis Memorial Hospital, after getting approval from the city commission government of Tarpon Springs and from voters on a 40-year lease.

On September 1, 2010, University Community Hospital became part of Adventist Health System. This happened after University Community Health merged with Adventist Health System. In late September 2011, University Community Hospital was rebranded to Florida Hospital Tampa.

On August 23, 2016, the hospital opened a ten room pediatric emergency department.

In the summer of 2018, the hospital announced that construction had begun on an expansion project for $256 million. It would include a six-story, 300,000 square foot (28,000 m^{2}) surgical tower, with twenty-four operating theatres, 100 private patient beds and a power plant. The cost increased to $300 million. On October 17, there was a groundbreaking for the Taneja Center for Innovative Surgery, the largest expansion in the history of the hospital. On January 2, 2019, Florida Hospital Tampa rebranded to AdventHealth Tampa. In May 2020, there was a topping out of the surgical tower. On October 12, 2021, the Taneja Center for Innovative Surgery opened. The majority of the money for the surgical tower was donated by an Indian couple from Largo, Florida, after their 44-year old son had died from glioblastoma. The surgical tower was designed by HuntonBrady Architects and was built by Robins & Morton, it was expected to create 587 new jobs in five years.

On December 16, 2020, frontline workers at AdventHealth Tampa received the Pfizer-BioNTech COVID-19 vaccine. In 2021, the hospital treated about 17,000 patients yearly.

On January 1, 2021, all hospitals were required to have their chargemaster on its website by the Centers for Medicare & Medicaid Services. In a survey done in 2022, the majority of hospitals in Florida including AdventHealth Tampa had failed to comply with the Hospital Price Transparency Law. It was not until early February 2023, that the hospital was in full compliance with the law.

In early September 2022, AdventHealth Tampa spent $2 million to upgrade its catheterization laboratory with the GE Allia from GE HealthCare, and a new single monitoring unit from Carrot Medical.

In early March 2023, AdventHealth Tampa opened a twenty bed unit to treat patients with advanced stages of heart disease. In late January 2025, the hospital opened a new 5,000 square foot (460 m^{2}) Obstetrics and Gynaecology Residency Clinic. By 2028, it plans to teach over 100 physicians to fill the gap in the Tampa Bay area.

In February 2026, it was name The Glazer Center for Medical Education, after the hospital received $3 million from the Glazer Family Foundation. In early August, DPR Construction began to build on campus a five-story, 100,000 square foot (9,300 m^{2}) medical office building with a cancer center, it was designed by HuntonBrady Architects. Also a seven-story parking garage with 1,100 spaces is being constructed by Finfrock. On September 21, AdventHealth Tampa launched its Dedicated Education Unit, a program created in partnership with AdventHealth University, that will allow nursing students to learn skills from a nurse.

== Medical errors and aftermath ==
On February 20, 1995 a physician at University Community Hospital amputated the left foot of a man with diabetes, when it should have been the right foot. After the mistake the hospital required that no be written on the limb not to be amputated. And it also required the physician and head nurse to agree before all surgeries. The man hired a lawyer who began to investigate the hospital by going through its medical records, this made University Community Hospital not happy saying that it was a victim. On May 12, the man settled his case against University Community Hospital for $900,000 and the physician for $250,000 for a total of $1.15 million. In late July, the same physician also cut off a woman's toe at Town & Country Hospital in Tampa without her permission. After the second amputation mistake his license was suspended by the Florida Board of Medicine. In early December, because of these two mistakes he was fined by the state $10,000 and his license was suspended for 6 months (140 of those days were already served, allowing him to practice medicine again in 1996).

On March 3, a respiratory therapist at University Community Hospital turned off the ventilator of a wrong patient. And to make matters worse a physician falsified the death certificate as a natural cause, the University Community Hospital did not notify the medical examiner and they also did no autopsy before man was buried in a casket. On March 13, the medical examiner gave an order to have him dug up after reading about the death in a newspaper, also the Florida Attorney General and the Hillsborough Sheriff's Office investigated his death as a crime. Later the autopsy revealed that the man had suffocated to death due to the mistake.

On March 16, a physician at University Community Hospital partially sterilized a woman with a tubal ligation on her right fallopian tube, during a Cesarean section without her permission. In late December, she sued the hospital, the physician and his former surgical group in Hillsborough Circuit Court. She was seeking $15,000 from defendants.

On March 31 and April 3, the Joint Commission on Accreditation of Healthcare Organizations investigated the hospital, after doing the investigations it stripped University Community Hospital of its accreditation. The medical facility appealed the decision.

On April 5, a physician at University Community Hospital accidentally cut a patient's lung, that same day the president of the hospital asked the Agency for Health Care Administration to due an investigation. The Agency for Health Care Administration ordered the hospital to stop all elective surgeries at midnight on April 8. They did this after an investigation of the facility found that multiple violations were taking place, it was also discovered that the employees were overworked due to a shortage of workers. All 326 physicians were ordered to be instructed on how to safely do medical procedures in an operating theater. During the ban other hospital's in Tampa received its patients, including Tampa General Hospital. On April 17, 600 employees and locals from Tampa protested the surgical ban by marching, cheering, clapping, and chanting; they were demanding that the state lift the ban. The Health Care Finance Administration led a broader investigation of the hospital with the Agency for Health Care Administration and federal agents reporting back. On April 19, the ban was lifted at midnight, after University Community Hospital paid a $341,000 fine to the Agency for Health Care Administration for its violations. Also the federal government changed its plans to cut off Medicare and Medicaid to the hospital after it took steps to improve patient safety.

By late November, the hospital had lost almost $6 million due to its medical errors.

In 1996, a physician at University Community Hospital fused the wrong vertebrae in a man's neck. In mid January 1998, he and his wife both sued the hospital for $5 million in pain, mental anguish and lost wages. In early April 2000, a jury awarded the man $3.3 million and the wife received $500,000 after they also sued the neurosurgeon.

== Partnership ==
On August 23, 2016, Florida Hospital Tampa announced that physicians from Johns Hopkins All Children's Hospital would be working at the hospital after it began offering pediatric programs in cardiology, hematology, intensive care medicine, oncology and hospital medicine from Johns Hopkins All Children's Hospital.

== Services ==
In late April 2019, physicians at AdventHealth Tampa were learning how to use virtual reality technology so that they could treat patients with epilepsy.

In early September 2021, the hospital had put its first wireless monitoring sensor implant into a patient with heart failure.

== Murder-suicide ==
On November 23, 2015, a murder-suicide took place at the hospital when Steven Reynolds shot his stepdaughter Alonna Tedesco and then himself.

== Awards and recognitions ==
The hospital received a grade A from The Leapfrog Group in 2018, 2019, 2020, 2021 and 2022. It received a grade B twice in 2026. AdventHealth Tampa was recognized by the non-profit organization as a top teaching hospital in 2020 and 2021.

== See also ==
- List of Seventh-day Adventist hospitals
- List of stroke centers in the United States
