= AdventHealth Lake Nona =

- AdventHealth

Geography
- Location: 10999 Narcoossee Road, Orlando, Florida, United States

Organization
- Care system: Private hospital
- Type: General hospital
- Religious affiliation: Seventh-day Adventist Church

Helipads
- Helipad: Yes

History
- Constructed: May 21, 2024

Links
- Lists: Hospitals in Florida

AdventHealth Lake Nona, nicknamed Hospital of the Future, is a non-profit hospital campus under construction in Lake Nona, Orlando, Florida, United States for AdventHealth.

== History ==
On December 16, 2016, Adventist Health System purchased 67.24 acres (27.21 ha) for $8 million, from Daryl M Carter Trust in Lake Nona north of Florida State Road 417.

In early March 2023, AdventHealth sent its plans to Orlando for a 250,000 square foot (23,000 m^{2}) hospital with 120 beds, a 50,000 square foot (4,600 m^{2}) medical office building and a parking garage to be built on land that it owns for $75 million. AdventHealth changed its plans for AdventHealth Lake Nona in July, to a five-story 300,000 square foot (28,000 m^{2}) hospital, with an additional two-stories of shell space at 75,000 square foot (7,000 m^{2}).

On May 21, 2024, there was a groundbreaking for AdventHealth Lake Nona. Before the groundbreaking of the hospital its size was changed again, it will first open with 80 beds and will later be expanded to 320 beds. The hospital will have 10-stories and cost $423 million to build. When AdventHealth Lake Nona opens, the 19,000 square foot (1,800 m^{2}) free-standing emergency department, will be moved to the hospital and the building will be refurbished for another purpose. The free-standing emergency department opened in late August 2020, on 15 acres (6.1 ha) that was purchased for $9 million in late December 2017. The campus will also have an amphitheater, restaurants and retail spaces.

In early September 2025, there was a topping out of AdventHealth Lake Nona. In December 2026, AdventHealth Lake Nona is scheduled to open.

== See also ==
- List of Seventh-day Adventist hospitals
