= AdventHealth Carrollwood =

- AdventHealth

Geography
- Location: 7171 North Dale Mabry Highway, Tampa, Florida, United States
- Coordinates: 28.0137°N 82.5039°W

Organization
- Care system: Private hospital
- Type: General hospital
- Religious affiliation: Seventh-day Adventist Church

Services
- Standards: Joint Commission
- Emergency department: Yes
- Beds: 119

Helipads
- Helipad: No

History
- Former names: Carrollwood Community Hospital; Centurion Hospital of Carrollwood; University Community Hospital-Carrollwood; Florida Hospital Carrollwood
- Opened: 1961

Links
- Website: www.adventhealth.com/hospital/adventhealth-carrollwood
- Lists: Hospitals in Florida

University Community Hospital, Inc. (doing business as AdventHealth Carrollwood) is a non-profit hospital campus in Egypt Lake-Leto, Florida, United States. It became part of AdventHealth following a merger with University Community Health in September 2010. The medical facility is a tertiary and primary stroke center that has multiple specialties. In February 2021, The Weeknd had 150 meals delivered to the hospital for its employees.

== History ==
=== 1961-1995 ===
In 1961, Carrollwood Community Hospital was founded. In 1989, Centurion Health of Carrollwood purchased the hospital which was in debt and changed its name to Centurion Hospital of Carrollwood. Two years later Centurion Health of Carrollwood filed for bankruptcy and put Centurion Hospital of Carrollwood up for sale.

In early July 1993, University Community Hospital agreed to purchase the hospital from Centurion Health of Carrollwood for $17.4 million. The sale had to be approved by creditors and the United States bankruptcy court. In early November, University Community Hospital officially took over the management of Centurion Hospital of Carrollwood and renamed it to University Community Hospital-Carrollwood.

On February 15, 1995, a physician did arthroscopy on the wrong knee of a woman, University Community Hospital-Carrollwood settled the case with the woman out of court. Also a physician mistakenly removed a woman's healthy ovary, while leaving the one that was diseased. The woman threatened to sue the hospital, her mistake took place in November 1993. Her lawyer told the hospital that he was willing to settle the case for $1 million, University Community Hospital-Carrollwood considered the request to be blackmail. The Agency for Health Care Administration ordered both University Community Hospital-Carrollwood, and its parent facility in Tampa University Community Hospital, to stop all elective surgeries on April 8, 1995. In late April, the ban was lifted at midnight, after University Community Hospital-Carrollwood paid a $195,000 fine for its violations.

=== 2009-2019 ===
In 2009, an expansion and renovation project began at University Community-Carrollwood. In the summer of 2010, phase one of construction was finished at the hospitals medical arts tower for $12.3 million. Three operating theaters were added to the second story increasing the number to nine. The third story was increased in size to 12,000 square foot (1,100 m^{2}) by renovating offices for a twenty-three intensive care unit and a progressive care unit. On September 1, 2010, University Community Hospital-Carrollwood became part of Adventist Health System. This happened after University Community Health merged with Adventist Health System. In late September 2011, University Community Hospital-Carrollwood was rebranded to Florida Hospital Carrollwood.

In early January 2012, Stevens Construction started renovations at the hospital with the radiology department. In late June 2013, construction workers finished renovating the fifth floor of Florida Hospital Carrollwood, and the hospital's surgical care unit with twenty-five private rooms opened in July on the newly renovated fifth floor. In 2015, construction workers began to expand the surgical tower by 45,200 square foot (4,200 m^{2}), and renovated the older 51,000 square foot (4,700 m^{2}) space. The tower was finished in January 2017 for $71 million. In early April 2018, a $17.5 million expansion of the emergency department began at Florida Hospital Carrollwood. The expanded Patel emergency department opened on December 19. It was named after Kiran C Patel who donated $5 million to the hospital. On January 2, 2019, Florida Hospital Carrollwood rebranded to AdventHealth Carrollwood.

=== 2021-present ===
On January 1, 2021, all hospitals were required to have their chargemaster on its website by the Centers for Medicare & Medicaid Services. In a survey done in 2022, the majority of hospitals in Florida including AdventHealth Carrollwood had failed to comply with the Hospital Price Transparency Law. It was not until early February 2023, that the hospital was in full compliance with the law.

On February 1, 2021, The Weeknd donated 150 meals to AdventHealth Carrollwood for its employees, he did this to celebrate Black History Month. The meals were purchased at an african-american restaurant and were delivered by Postmates.

In early February 2022, AdventHealth Carrollwood announced that it would renovate 25 patient rooms to treat COVID-19 patients. It will be 10,680 square foot (992 m^{2}) and cost $5.4 million. The money is part of a $285.9 million given to Hillsborough County from the American Rescue Plan Act of 2021. On June 21, ThunderBug visited employees and patients at AdventHealth Carrollwood after the Tampa Bay Lightning won game 3 of the 2022 Stanley Cup Finals.

In early February 2023, AdventHealth Carrollwood purchased 2.38 acres (0.96 ha) for $20.725 million. The reason why the hospital purchased the lot was for the 53,685 square foot (4,987.5 m^{2}) medical office building on it.

On June 18, 2026, it was announced that the medical facility would have a six-story, 165,000 square foot (15,300 m^{2}) patient tower built for $214 million. It would have 64 beds, operating theaters and a cardiac catheterization/electrophysiology laboratory. HuntonBrady Architects designed the tower. Also a five-story parking garage would be built on the campus. The reason for the expansion is because of the rapid growth of Hillsborough County.

== Awards and recognitions ==
In early April 2013, Florida Hospital Carrollwood received the HIMSS Analytics Stage 7 Award for its electronic health records.

The hospital received from The Leapfrog Group a grade B in fall 2014 and spring 2015. It received a grade A in fall 2015, 2016, 2017, 2018, 2019, 2020, 2021, 2022, 2023, 2024, 2025, and 2026.

The medical facility was recognized by the non-profit organization as a top general hospital from 2017 to 2019.

AdventHealth Carrollwood received from the Centers for Medicare & Medicaid Services a five-star rating in 2021 and 2022.

== See also ==
- List of Seventh-day Adventist hospitals
- List of stroke centers in the United States
