= AdventHealth Riverview =

- AdventHealth

Geography
- Location: 9330 US Highway 301 South, Riverview, Florida, United States
- Coordinates: 27.8611°N 82.3251°W

Organization
- Care system: Private hospital
- Type: General hospital
- Religious affiliation: Seventh-day Adventist Church

Services
- Standards: DNV Healthcare
- Emergency department: Yes
- Beds: 82

Helipads
- Helipad: Aeronautical chart and airport information for 26FA at SkyVector

History
- Constructed: November 30, 2021
- Opened: October 23, 2024

Links
- Website: www.adventhealth.com/hospital/adventhealth-riverview
- Lists: Hospitals in Florida

AdventHealth Riverview, Inc. is a non-profit hospital campus in Riverview, Florida, United States owned by AdventHealth. When it opened it became the hospital networks twenty-ninth hospital in Florida. The medical facility is a tertiary and psychiatric hospital that has multiple specialties.

== History ==
In early June 2020, AdventHealth purchased 22 acres (8.9 ha) in Riverview, Florida by U.S. Route 301 for $3.95 million to build a hospital and medical office building. The hospital would be 209,000 square foot (19,400 m^{2}) and would cost $216 million. It was later changed to 282,000 square foot (26,200 m^{2}) and $251 million There will also be a 100,000 square feet (9,300 m^{2}) medical plaza. AdventHealth Riverview will have 82 beds, and enough shell space to increase the number of beds to 200 as the needs grow.

In October 2021, AdventHealth had a virtual groundbreaking. On November 30, Robins & Morton began construction of AdventHealth Riverview.

On May 24, 2023, there was a topping out of AdventHealth Riverview. On June 13, AdventHealth purchased another 4 acres (1.6 ha) in Riverview for $3.25 million. All total the AdventHealth Riverview site has 40 acres (16 ha). On October 23, 2024, AdventHealth Riverview opened to treat patients from Apollo Beach, Gibsonton, Lithia, Riverview, Sun City Center and Wimauma. It was designed by HuntonBrady Architects and 1,000 employees were hired by AdventHealth for the hospital. The reason why AdventHealth had the hospital built was due to the rapid growth of Hillsborough County, Florida.

On June 5, 2025, AdventHealth Riverview announced that it would be adding more beds due to it being at full capacity. Starting in November, 68 beds will be added for $50 million, increasing the number of beds to 150.

== Charity giving ==
In September 2026, AdventHealth Riverview helped YMCA in Tampa to replace its riding arena at Camp Cristina.

== See also ==
- List of Seventh-day Adventist hospitals
