= AdventHealth Sebring =

- AdventHealth
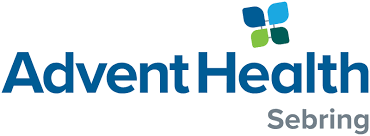

Geography
- Location: 4200 Sun 'n Lake Boulevard, Sebring, Florida, United States
- Coordinates: 27.5393°N 81.5087°W

Organization
- Care system: Private hospital
- Type: General hospital and Teaching hospital
- Religious affiliation: Seventh-day Adventist Church
- Affiliated university: South Florida State College

Services
- Standards: Joint Commission
- Emergency department: Yes
- Beds: 171

Helipads
- Helipad: Aeronautical chart and airport information for FA52 at SkyVector

History
- Former names: Walker Memorial Sanitarium and Hospital; Walker Memorial Medical Center; Florida Hospital Heartland Medical Center
- Constructed: 1969
- Opened: 1948, 1969 and 1997

Links
- Website: www.adventhealth.com/hospital/adventhealth-sebring
- Lists: Hospitals in Florida

Adventist Health System-Sunbelt, Inc. (doing business as AdventHealth Sebring) is a non-profit hospital campus in Sebring, Florida, United States owned by AdventHealth. The medical facility is a tertiary, teaching hospital, burn center, and primary stroke center that has multiple specialties.

== History ==
After the World War II, many Highlands County residents desired to have a hospital in the county. The county itself lacked money to convert Lake Lillian hotel and casino into a hospital, so in 1946 various community leaders and representatives of the Seventh-day Adventist Church agreed that it should be converted into a hospital. In June 1947, a subsidiary group of the Adventist Church purchased the old hotel building at a 100% discount with the provision that $150,000 be raised by October to be used toward converting the building. The Adventist Church spent $400,000 to aid in developing the hospital. The Ridge Area Hospital Association, led by Charles Walker, worked in the community to obtain donations for the hospital project. In 1948, Walker Memorial Sanitarium and Hospital opened, in memory of Charles Walker who died the same year. In 1969, a new hospital was built in Avon Park, Florida.

The Walker Memorial Medical Center was showing its age by the 1990s and the Adventists felt it was time to build a completely new facility. In 1997, the hospital moved to Sebring and was renamed Florida Hospital Heartland Medical Center.

On April 2, 2009, the hospital was locked down by an anthrax scare. After forty-eight envelopes were placed on motor vehicles in its parking lot and also twenty-eight more envelopes were put in mailboxes across Sebring. On April 3, a local man was arrested and told police that it was done as an April Fool's Day joke. He was charged with seventy-nine counts of possessing a hoax weapon of mass destruction. One month later the police arrested a second man as an accomplice.

On January 2, 2019, Florida Hospital Heartland Medical Center rebranded to AdventHealth Sebring. In late June 2020, the hospital opened a new 24,000 square foot (2,200 m^{2}), Heart and Vascular Center for $17.5 million, with twenty-four private rooms and a catheterization laboratory.

On January 1, 2021, all hospitals were required to have their chargemaster on its website by the Centers for Medicare & Medicaid Services. In early February 2023, almost all of the AdventHealth hospitals had their chargemaster on their website, including AdventHealth Sebring. On March 14, 2024, a murder-suicide took place at AdventHealth Sebring when Joe Landon shot his special needs adult son Noah and then himself in the emergency department. This forced the hospital to go on lockdown and ambulances were diverted to other hospitals. On June 21, the hospital graduated its first class of forty-eight physicians from its family medicine residency program.

On January 21, 2026, the hospital had a groundbreaking for a five-story, 100,000 square foot (9,300 m^{2}) cardiovascular tower for $130 million. It will have an operating theater, an intensive care unit, and two laboratories. The tower will increase the number of beds from 171 to 275, the fourth and fifth floors will be shelled space for future expansion. Brasfield & Gorrie will begin construction of the tower in March on the hospital's northeastside, it was designed by HuntonBrady Architects.

== Awards and recognitions ==
The hospital received a grade A from The Leapfrog Group in fall 2013 and spring 2014; and from 2019, spring 2020, 2021 and 2022.

The medical facility was recognized by the non-profit organization as a top general hospital from 2018 to 2020.

== See also ==
- List of Seventh-day Adventist hospitals
- List of burn centers in the United States
- List of stroke centers in the United States
