= Warburton Hospital =

Coordinates: 37°45′4.28″S 145°42′19.11″E

- Seventh-day Adventist Church
- Front Building, Warburton Hospital

Geography
- Location: Donna Buang Road, Warburton, Victoria, Australia

Organisation
- Type: Private

History
- Founded: 1910
- Closed: 30 September 2000

Links
- Lists: Hospitals in Australia

Warburton Hospital was a private, Adventist hospital in Warburton, Victoria in Australia. The hospital was owned by the Trans Australian Union Conference of the Seventh day Adventist Church. It had 50 hospital beds, a high dependency unit and a 24-hour emergency department, a pathology lab, birthing suites, and radiology and operating theatres.

== History ==
The hospital was opened in 1910. The hospital had a net loss of $2.25 million (including depreciation) over the previous five years. It was placed on the market in January 1998. It was sold in September 2000, and ceased operations on 14 March 2001 despite recently having received $250,000 in refurbishments. A separate source reports it was closed since 2006.

In 2020, an unsuccessful Change.org petition was signed by 2,400 community members to reopen the hospital in wake of the COVID-19 pandemic.

== See also ==
- List of Seventh-day Adventist hospitals
