= HuntonBrady Architects =

American interior design firm

HuntonBrady Architects is a modern architecture and interior design firm based in Orlando, Florida. It was founded by Robert B. Murphy in 1947 and has received more than 70 American Institute of Design Awards. The practice's specialties include healthcare, education and commercial office design.

Robert Murphy grew up in Charleston, South Carolina, and earned his first architectural degree from Clemson in 1936. He entered Harvard's Graduate School of Design a year after Walter Gropius became Dean of the school and graduated with a master's degree in 1940. He served in the Army Air Corps during World War II. After the war he settled in Orlando and established his namesake architectural firm: Robert B. Murphy, Architect in January 1947. He added partners Tom Hunton, Claude Shivers, and Clyde Brady in the 1960s making firm Murphy Hunton Shivers & Brady by the time he retired in 1979. Continuing on as Hunton Shivers & Brady, the firm briefly merged with a Tampa firm in the mid-1980s to become DesignArts, but soon reversed the merger and reorganized as Hunton Brady Pryor Maso with the addition of principal architects Fred Pryor and Maurizio Maso. The firm eventually changed its name to HuntonBrady Architects to maintain continuity as principals died or retired. Chuck Cole served as President after Pryor's death in 2005 and Steve Belflower became President upon Cole's retirement in 2017.

HuntonBrady has two office locations in Florida - Orlando and Tampa, with over 110 employees.

== Recent projects ==
- Florida Hospital Orlando Ginsburg Patient Tower, 15-story building near downtown Orlando
- University of Central Florida College of Medicine
- Seminole Community College's Heathrow Technology Center
- Seminole Community College Altamonte Springs campus
- University of Central Florida College of Medicine
- AdventHealth Orlando Northwest Tower, a 14-story patient and surgical tower
- AdventHealth Zephyrhills medical office building
- AdventHealth Daytona Beach expansion of two towers
- AdventHealth Sebring five-story northeast tower
- AdventHealth Carrollwood six-story patient tower
- AdventHealth Treaty Oaks ER

== Past projects ==
- City of Orlando Firehouse at Marks & Ferncreek - 1950s
- American Federal Building, Orlando - 1960s
- Central Branch of the YMCA, Orlando - 1960s
- University of Central Florida campus buildings; the Science Building, the Library Building, the Student Center and dormitories (1970s) in east Orlando
- Central Florida at The Springs (1970s) community's first patio homes
- Valencia Community College (1970s) on Kirkman Road
- Sabal Center (1980s)
- Maitland Colonnades (1980s)
- Southtrust Bank Building (1980s)
- 2600 Maitland Center (1980s)
- Team Disney Corporate Headquarters (1980s) with Arata Isozaki
- Orange County Convention Center Phase III Addition - 1990s
- Heathrow International Business Center (1990s), off I-4
- Fiserv CBS worldwide headquarters (2000s), Lake Mary, Florida
- Castle Rock Adventist Hospital (2010s)
- AdventHealth Palm Coast Parkway(2020s)
- AdventHealth Riverview (2020s)
- AdventHealth Winter Haven ER(2020s)
- AdventHealth Tampa's Taneja Center for Innovative Surgery(2020s)
- Freytag Cancer Center at AdventHealth Palm Coast (2020s)
