= Dr. Phillips Center for the Performing Arts =

Venue in Orlando, Florida, US

Coordinates: 28.538032°N 81.378192°W

Dr. Phillips Center
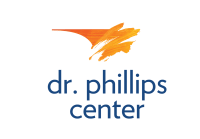

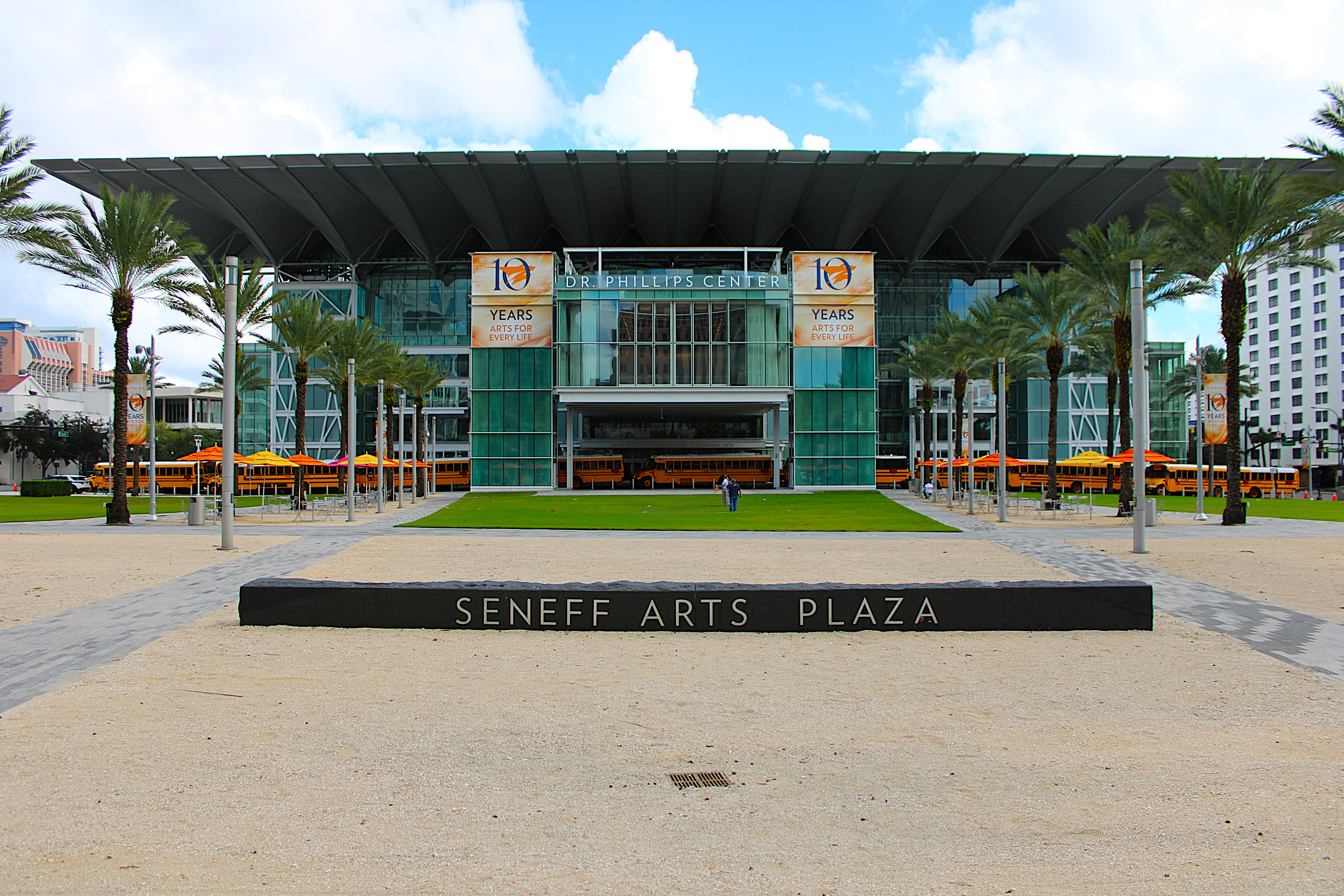
- Exterior of venue (c. 2024)
- Address: 445 S Magnolia Ave.
- Location: Downtown Orlando
- Owner: City of Orlando
- Capacity: 2,700 (Walt Disney Theater); 1,700 (Steinmetz Hall); 340 (DeVos Family Room); 294 (Alexis & Jim Pugh Theater); 150 (Judson’s Live)

Construction
- Groundbreaking: June 23, 2011
- Opened: November 6, 2014
- Expanded: January 14, 2022
- Cost: $613 million
- Architects: Barton Myers; HKS Architects, Executive Architect; Baker Barrios Architects, Inc.
- Project managers: AMS Planning & Research Corp
- Structural engineer: TLC Engineering Solutions
- Services engineer: TLC Engineering Solutions.
- General contractor: Balfour Beatty Construction
- Main contractors: Forte Young, Inc.; R.L. Burns, Inc.; Rey Group, Inc.

Tenant
- Orlando Ballet (2014–present)

Website
- Venue Website

Dr. Phillips Center for the Performing Arts (commonly known as Dr. Phillips Center) is a performing arts center in Downtown Orlando, Florida, United States. It joined the Bob Carr Theater, which originally opened as the Orlando Municipal Auditorium in 1927, to become Orlando's main performance venue. The center's grand opening was held on November 6, 2014.

== History and development ==
Barton Myers was the design architect with Artec Acoustic Consultants and Theatre Project Consultants co-designing the theaters. HKS Architects was the executive architect in association with Baker Barrios Architects, Inc.

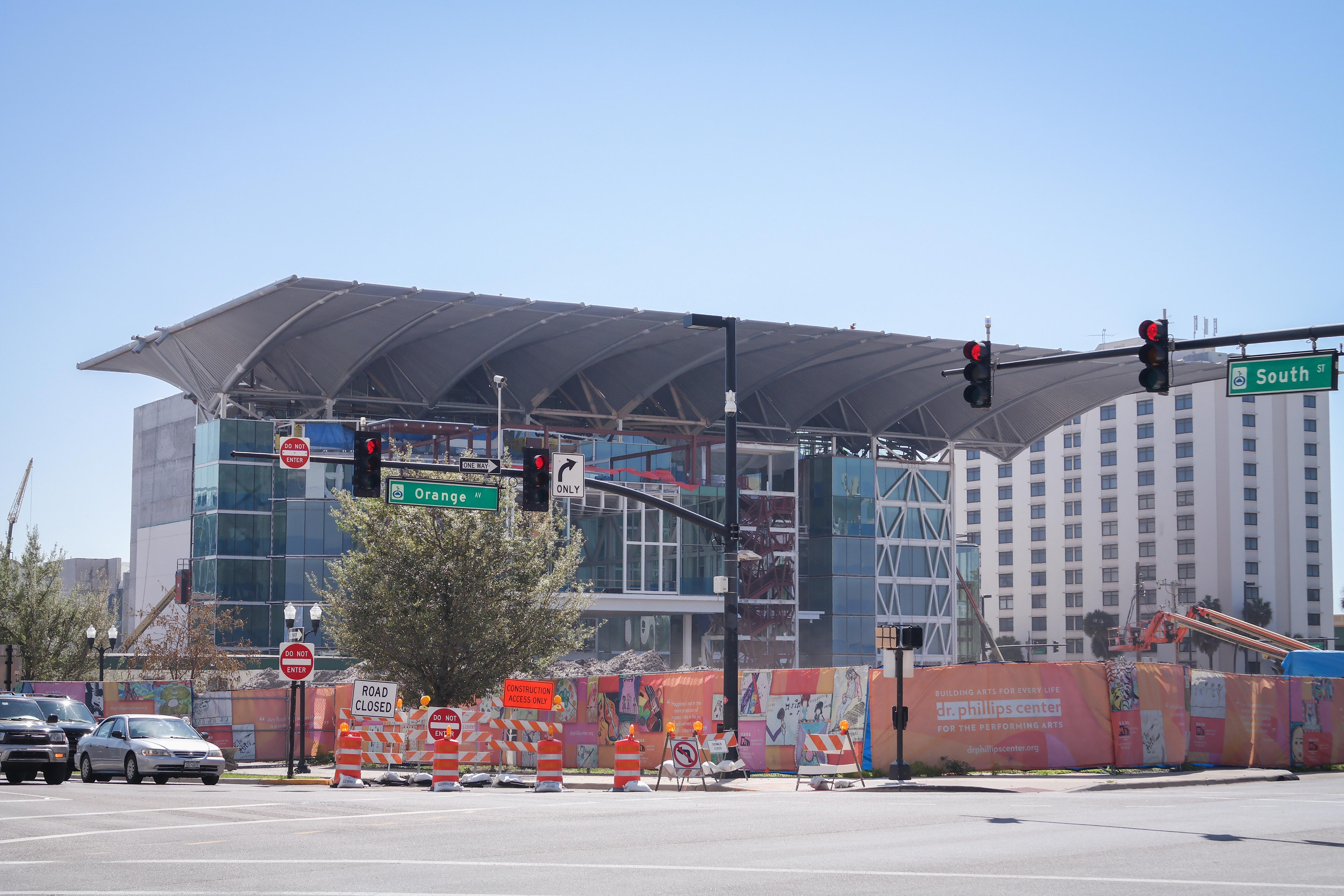
Venue during construction (March 2014)

The venue was approved along with a new Kia Center (which replaced the Amway Arena) and improvements to the Camping World Stadium after a series of hearings and votes, culminating in final votes in the Orange County Board of County Commissioners on July 26, 2007, and the Orlando City Council on August 6, 2007.

The design for the new venue was revealed on August 21, 2008. The venue features a 2,700-seat amplified hall, Walt Disney Theater, for Broadway musicals and multi-genre concerts as well as a 300-seat venue, Alexis & Pugh Theater, for smaller shows and events. Steinmetz Hall, the center’s third performance venue, is a 1,700‑seat multiform theater. It can be configured as a symphony concert hall, a proscenium theater, or a banquet hall. Construction began on March 6, 2017, and the hall officially opened on January 14, 2022. The final space to debut was Judson’s Live, a cabaret‑style music room for intimate performances, which opened on January 21, 2024.

The venue costs US$613 million, with the completion of Steinmetz Hall. Two-thirds of the funding comes from public funds, largely from the Orange County tourist development tax. The other one-third comes from private donations, including a large grant from the Dr. P. Phillips Foundation, the philanthropic organization funded through the estate of Philip Phillips.

A slow-down in the tourist development tax and other economic conditions forced the plans to become phased into two stages of construction. Walt Disney Theater and Alexis & Jim Pugh Theater were part of Phase I. Phase II included Steinmetz Hall and Judson's. Groundbreaking took place in June 2011.

The center occupies two city blocks. Some of the existing structures demolished to clear room for the center include Orlando Fire Department Station #1 (which moved to Central Blvd.); an annex building of First United Methodist Church of Orlando; and the round American Federal Building, constructed in the 1960s. The center is bordered by Orange Ave. to the west, South St. to the north, Rosalind Ave. to the east, and Anderson St. to the south. Magnolia Ave. bisects the property.

The first Broadway production to play the Walt Disney Theater was Cameron Mackintosh's new, non-replica production of The Phantom of the Opera.
