= American Federal Building =

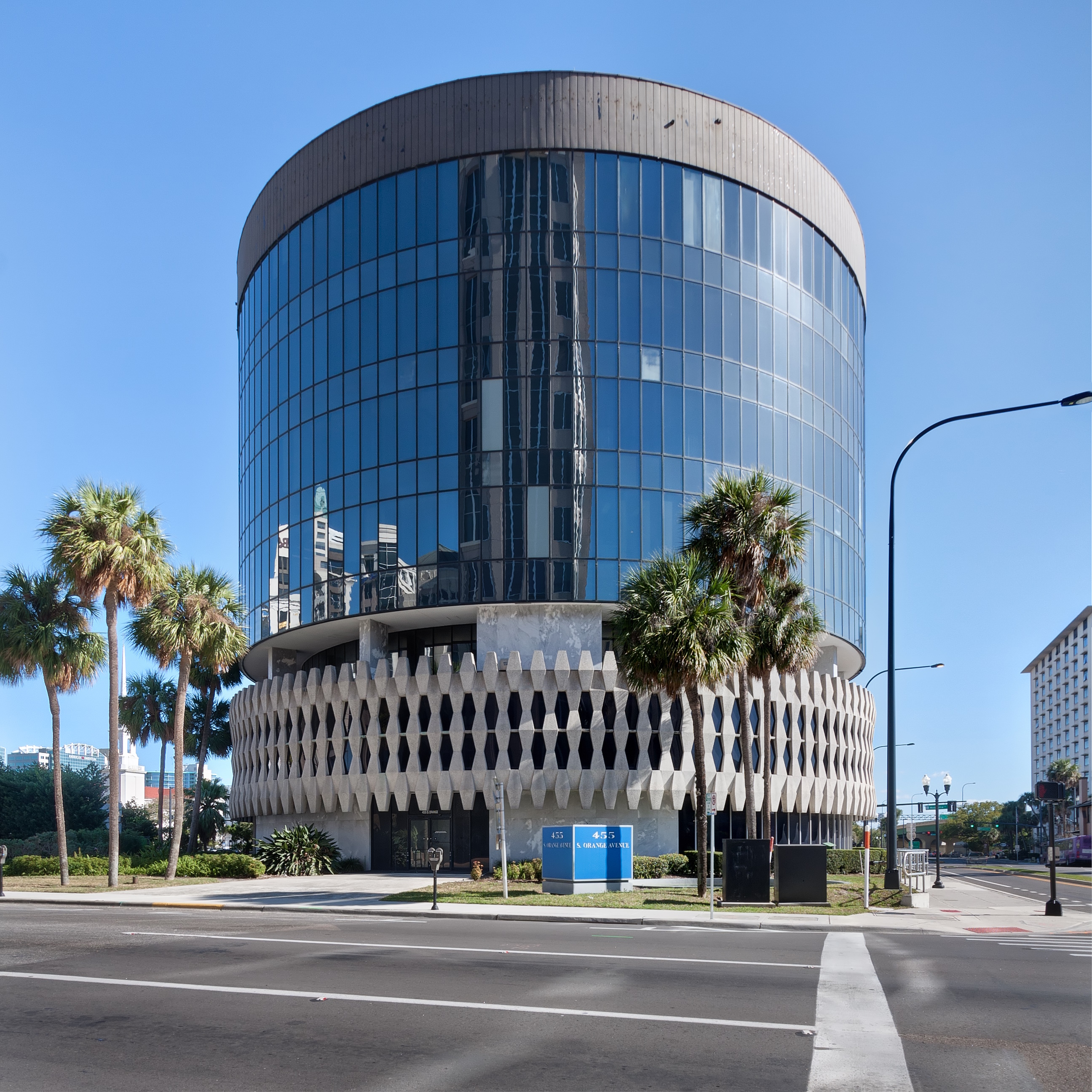
- Interactive map of the American Federal Building area
- Alternative names: The Round Building

General information
- Architectural style: Mid-Century modern
- Location: 455 South Orange Ave; Orlando, Florida 32801, United States
- Coordinates: 28.537357°N 81.378230°W
- Construction started: 1962
- Completed: 1963
- Renovated: 1973
- Demolished: 2015

Technical details
- Floor count: 7
- Floor area: 66,000 sq ft (6,100 m^{2})

Design and construction
- Architect: Robert Murphy
- Architecture firm: Robert B. Murphy AIA
- Main contractor: Jack Jennings & Sons

The American Federal Building, also known as the American Federal Savings and Loan Building, the Coral Gables Building, and the Round Building, was an iconic seven-story office building in downtown Orlando, Florida. The bottom two floors, encircled with a cast concrete brise soleil comprise the original building, were completed in 1963. The building's unique architecture and history had inspired efforts to preserve it from demolition.

== History ==
American Federal Savings and Loan Association acquired a 60,000-foot (18,000 m) lot In 1961 for US$400,000. The American Federal Building was designed by architect Robert Murphy, who had established his practice in Orlando in 1947 and his firm later became HuntonBrady. The building was originally a two story structure, surrounded by pre-cast a concrete brise soleil, giving the building a distinct modern appearance. The construction firm Jack Jennings & Sons erected the original building, completing it in 1963.

In 1973, five additional floors were added to the building with glass-clad outer walls.

The building has had a number of banking tenants during its history including Coral Gables Federal Savings, First Union and Loan and CNL Financial Group. The City of Orlando purchased the building in its final years and used it for overflow office space from City Hall which was directly across Orange Avenue.

The building (shown here in 2009) was demolished (the process, hampered by delays, beginning in the fall of 2014 and completed by the summer of 2015) to provide space for the construction of the Dr. Phillips Center for the Performing Arts. Plans were made by The Nils M. Schweizer Fellows, a group of mid century modern architecture enthusiasts and architects from the local American Institute of Architects (AIA) chapter and historians to salvage and repurpose the 120-piece concrete brise soleil latticework that surrounds the building.

The first preserved and re-purposed Brise Soleil segment was installed in front of the Orange County Regional History Center in Downtown Orlando in November 2018.
