= AdventHealth Zephyrhills =

- AdventHealth

Geography
- Location: 7050 Gall Boulevard, Zephyrhills, Florida, United States
- Coordinates: 28.2608°N 82.1852°W

Organization
- Care system: Private hospital
- Type: General hospital
- Religious affiliation: Seventh-day Adventist Church
- Affiliated university: Saint Leo University

Services
- Standards: Joint Commission
- Emergency department: Yes
- Beds: 149

Helipads
- Helipad: Aeronautical chart and airport information for FD75 at SkyVector

History
- Former names: Jackson Memorial Hospital; East Pasco Medical Center; Florida Hospital Zephyrhills
- Opened: 1934 and January 1985

Links
- Website: www.adventhealth.com/hospital/adventhealth-zephyrhills
- Lists: Hospitals in Florida

Florida Hospital Zephyrhills, Inc. (doing business as AdventHealth Zephyrhills) is a non-profit hospital in Zephyrhills, Florida, United States owned by AdventHealth. The medical facility is a tertiary and primary stroke center that has multiple specialties.

== History ==
In the early 1920s, T. F. Jackson opened a two-room clinic on the second floor of the Touchton building in Dade City, Florida. In late October 1926, he purchased the former house of Reverend H. N. Abraham for his practice. He later moved it again several years later to a building west of Pasco Middle School. On August 1, 1934, Pasco County, Florida purchased the facility and renamed it Jackson Memorial Hospital, in remembrance of the founder who died the same year. Over the years several wings were added. In 1961, the older portion of the hospital was demolished.

In 1981, Adventist Health System Sunbelt Healthcare Corporation purchased the hospital. In January 1985, it was moved to Zephyrhills and was renamed East Pasco Medical Center. The property in Dade City was purchased by the county for its health department, later the social services department and the Sheriff's Office also moved into the former medical facility. In 1999, East Pasco Medical Center expanded its emergency department, before it was expanded the hospital rejected patients, forcing them to go to Columbia Dade City Hospital.

On January 1, 2006, East Pasco Medical Center rebranded to Florida Hospital Zephyrhills. In early October 2012, the hospital opened the Simpson Breast Health Center, the facility is named after a local that donated $250,000 to the hospital's foundation. On January 2, 2019, Florida Hospital Zephyrhills rebranded to AdventHealth Zephyrhills.

On January 1, 2021, all hospitals were required to have their chargemaster on its website by the Centers for Medicare & Medicaid Services. In a survey done in 2022, the majority of hospitals in Florida including AdventHealth Zephyrhills had failed to comply with the Hospital Price Transparency Law. It was not until early February 2023, that the hospital was in full compliance with the law.

On August 29, 2025, there was a groundbeaking for a 35,000 square foot (3,300 m^{2}) medical office building, HuntonBrady Architects was hired to design it and Robins & Morton to build it. On March 4, 2026, the building was topped out.

== Awards and recognitions ==
=== The Leapfrog Group ===
The medical facility was recognized The Leapfrog Group as a top general hospital from 2018 to 2023. The hospital received a grade A from the non-profit organization in 2019, 2020, 2021, 2022. And received it again in fall 2023, 2024, 2025, and 2026.

=== Centers for Medicare & Medicaid Services ===
AdventHealth Zephyrhills received from the Centers for Medicare & Medicaid Services a five-star rating in 2021 and 2022, and received it again in 2024 and 2025.

=== Healthgrades ===
The medical facility was recognized by Healthgrades with its America's 250 Best Hospital Award from 2021 to 2024, and received it again in 2026.

=== Forbes ===
On December 4, 2025, the medical facility was recognized by Forbes in its new Top Hospitals list with a five-star ranking.

== See also ==
- List of Seventh-day Adventist hospitals
- List of stroke centers in the United States
