= Alpheus Ellis =

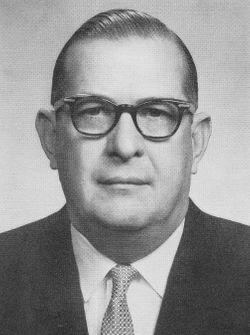
- Ellis in 1961
- Born: Alpheus Lee Ellis; 5 February 1906; Elba, Alabama, United States
- Died: 29 October 1995 (aged 89); Tarpon Springs, Florida, United States
- Occupations: Banker; Philanthropist
- Spouse: Helen Ellis (m. 1936; died 1989)
- Children: 1, Carol Ellis Martin

Alpheus Lee Ellis (February 5, 1906 – October 29, 1995) was an American banker and philanthropist.

Ellis was born in Elba, Alabama. He went to college in 1923 for 3 years at Alabama Polytechnic Institute. He moved to Florida at the age of 19 where he started his career in banking. He married Helen Lansden on April 11, 1936.

Ellis was a banker for more than 60 years. He was the president and founder of Ellis Bank & Trust Company of Florida. He developed his chain of banks to 75 branches and assets of $1.6-billion when he sold out to NCNB of Charlotte, North Carolina, in 1983. Ellis was the second-largest stockholder in NationsBank Corporation after completing the bank merger. He was a former president of the Florida Bankers Association and a director of the Federal Reserve Bank of Atlanta.

In 1987, NCNB National Bank donated $500,000 to the Children's Home Society of Florida, in honor of Mr. Ellis. The organization honored him in 1995, 50 years after he and his wife adopted their daughter Carol from the agency, for his support of the program.

On October 29, 1995, Ellis died at 89 from a heart attack while recovering from surgery at Helen Ellis Memorial Hospital.

Ellis's daughter, Carol E. Martin died on April 7, 2021, at the age of 76, like her father she was a philanthropist and donated to numerous charities during her lifetime.
