= Leto, Florida =

Unincorporated community in Florida, US

- Unincorporated community
- Location within Florida Location within the United States
- Coordinates: 28°00′39″N 82°31′02″W
- Country: United States
- State: Florida
- County: Hillsborough
- Elevation: 30 ft (9.1 m)
- Time zone: UTC-5 (Eastern (EST))
  - Summer (DST): UTC-4 (EDT)
- ZIP code: 33614
- Area code: 813
- GNIS feature ID: 2407587

Leto is an unincorporated community in northwestern Hillsborough County, Florida, United States. Along with Egypt Lake, it is a part of the census-designated place (CDP) of Egypt Lake-Leto. It was a separate CDP from 1970 to 1990, and was known as West Park until 1990. The population as of the 1990 census was 10,347. It's ZIP code is 33614.

== Geography ==
Historical population
Census	Pop.	Note	%±
1970	8,458		—
1980	9,003		6.4%
1990	10,347		14.9%

Leto is located at 28 degrees north, 82.5 degrees west (28.011, -82.517); or approximately five miles northwest of Tampa. The elevation for the community is 45 feet above sea level.

Leto boundaries include Tampa International Airport to the south, Egypt Lake to the east, Carrollwood to the north, and Town 'n' Country to the west. It is situated on the Dale Mabry Highway.

== Education ==
The community of Leto is served by Hillsborough County Schools. Leto High School is located within the community.
