= List of Seventh-day Adventist hospitals =

List of hospitals operated by the Seventh-day Adventist Church

In 2022, the Seventh-day Adventist Church is the largest Protestant health care provider in the world, with 1,000 facilities around the world. The facilities all together have 36,000 beds and 78,000 employees. All together 1.5 million admissions and 20 million outpatient visits.

== Seventh-day Adventist hospitals ==
Hospital name	Location	Country	Beds	Est.	Photo
AdventHealth Altamonte Springs (Note: Formerly Florida Hospital Altamonte)	Altamonte Springs, Florida	United States	398		
AdventHealth Apopka (Note: Formerly Florida Hospital Apopka)	Apopka, Florida	United States	120		
AdventHealth Avista (Note: Formerly Avist Adventist Hospital; renamed in 2023)	Louisville, Colorado	United States	114	1895	
AdventHealth Carrollwood (Note: Formerly Florida Hospital Carrollwood; renamed in 2019.)	Egypt Lake-Leto	United States	103	1962	
AdventHealth Castle Rock (Note: Formerly Castle Rock Adventist Hospital; renamed in 2023)	Castle Rock, Colorado	United States	90		
AdventHealth Celebration (Note: Florida Hospital Celebration Health; renamed in 2019.)	Celebration, Florida	United States	227		
AdventHealth Central Texas (Note: Formerly Metroplex Hospital; renamed in 2019.)	Killeen, Texas	United States	230	1980	
AdventHealth Connerton (Note: Formerly Florida Hospital at Connerton Long Term Acute Care; renamed in 2019.)	Land O' Lakes, Florida	United States	77		
AdventHealth Dade City (Note: Formerly Florida Hospital Dade City; renamed in 2019.)	Dade City, Florida	United States	120	1973	
AdventHealth Daytona Beach (Note: Formerly Florida Hospital Memorial Medical Center; renamed in 2019.)	Daytona Beach, Florida	United States	362		
AdventHealth DeLand (Note: Formerly Florida Hospital DeLand; renamed in 2019.)	DeLand, Florida	United States	164	1962	
AdventHealth Durand (Note: Formerly Chippewa Valley Hospital & Oakview Care Center; renamed in 2019.)	Durand, Wisconsin	United States	25	1956	
AdventHealth East Orlando (Note: Formerly Florida Hospital East Orlando; renamed in 2019.)	Orlando, Florida	United States	295		
AdventHealth Fish Memorial (Note: Formerly Florida Hospital Fish Memorial; renamed in 2019.)	Orange City, Florida	United States	257	1996	
AdventHealth for Children (Note: Formerly Florida Hospital for Children; renamed in 2019.)	Orlando, Florida	United States			
AdventHealth for Women (Note: Formerly Florida Hospital for Women; renamed in 2019.)	Orlando, Florida	United States			
AdventHealth Gordon (Note: Formerly Gordon Hospital; renamed in 2019.)	Calhoun, Georgia	United States	69	1953 (Note: Acquired in 1995.)	
AdventHealth Heart of Florida (Note: Formerly Heart of Florida Regional Medical Center; renamed in 2019.)	Davenport, Florida	United States	202		
AdventHealth Hendersonville (Note: Formerly Park Ridge Health; renamed in 2019.)	Hendersonville, North Carolina	United States	103	1920	
AdventHealth Kissimmee (Note: Formerly Florida Hospital Kissimmee; renamed in 2019.)	Kissimmee, Florida	United States			
AdventHealth Lake Placid (Note: Formerly Florida Hospital Medical Center Lake Placid; renamed in 2019.)	Lake Placid, Florida	United States			
AdventHealth Lake Wales (Note: Formerly Lake Wales Medical Center)	Lake Wales, Florida	United States	160		
AdventHealth Lenexa City Center	Lenexa, Kansas	United States			
AdventHealth Littleton (Note: Formerly Littleton Adventist Hospital; renamed in 2023)	Littleton, Colorado	United States	231	1989	
AdventHealth Manchester (Note: Formerly Manchester Memorial Hospital; renamed in 2019.)	Manchester, Kentucky	United States	49	1955	
AdventHealth Minneola	Minneola, Florida	United States	80	2025	
AdventHealth Murray (Note: Formerly Murray Medical Center; renamed in 2019.)	Chatsworth, Georgia	United States	42		
AdventHealth New Smyrna Beach (Note: Formerly Florida Hospital New Smyrna; renamed in 2019.)	New Smyrna Beach, Florida	United States	109		
AdventHealth North Pinellas (Note: Formerly Florida Hospital North Pinellas; renamed in 2019.)	Tarpon Springs, Florida	United States	168	1970	
AdventHealth Ocala (Note: Formerly Florida Hospital Ocala; renamed in 2019.)	Ocala, Florida	United States	425	1898	
AdventHealth Orlando (Note: Formerly Florida Hospital; renamed in 2019.)	Orlando, Florida	United States	1,432	1908	
AdventHealth Ottawa (Note: Formerly Ransom Memorial Health; renamed in 2019.)	Ottawa, Kansas	United States	44		
AdventHealth Palm Coast (Note: Formerly Florida Hospital Flagler; renamed in 2019.)	Palm Coast, Florida	United States	99		
AdventHealth Palm Coast Parkway	Palm Coast, Florida	United States	100	2023	
AdventHealth Parker (Note: Formerly Parker Adventist Hospital; renamed in 2023)	Parker, Colorado	United States	170		
AdventHealth Polk (Note: Formerly St. Luke's Hospital)	Columbus, North Carolina	United States	25	1929	
AdventHealth Port Charlotte (Note: Formerly ShorePoint Health Port Charlotte; renamed in 2025)	Port Charlotte	United States	254	1962	
AdventHealth Porter (Note: Formerly Porter Adventist Hospital; renamed in 2023)	Denver	United States	368	1930	
AdventHealth Redmond (Note: Formerly Redmond Regional Medical Center)	Rome, Georgia	United States	230	1972	
AdventHealth Riverview	Riverview, Florida	United States	82		
AdventHealth Rollins Brook (Note: Formerly Rollins Brook Community Hospital; renamed in 2019.)	Lampasas, Texas	United States	25	1992	
AdventHealth Sebring (Note: Formerly Florida Hospital Heartland Medical Center Sebring; renamed in 2019.)	Sebring, Florida	United States	204	1948	
AdventHealth Shawnee Mission (Note: Formerly Shawnee Mission Medical Center; renamed in 2019.)	Shawnee Mission, Kansas	United States	504	1962	
AdventHealth South Overland Park	Overland Park, Kansas	United States	85	2021	
AdventHealth Tampa (Note: Formerly Florida Hospital Tampa; renamed in 2019.)	Tampa, Florida	United States	626	1966	
AdventHealth Waterman (Note: Formerly Florida Hospital Waterman; renamed in 2019.)	Tavares, Florida	United States	280	1933	
AdventHealth Wauchula (Note: Formerly Florida Hospital Wauchula; renamed in 2019.)	Wauchula, Florida	United States	25	1994	
AdventHealth Wesley Chapel (Note: Formerly Florida Hospital Wesley Chapel; renamed in 2019.)	Wesley Chapel, Florida	United States	169		
AdventHealth Winter Garden (Note: Formerly Florida Hospital Winter Garden; renamed in 2019.)	Winter Garden, Florida	United States			
AdventHealth Winter Park (Note: Formerly Winter Park Memorial Hospital; renamed in 2019.)	Winter Park, Florida	United States			
AdventHealth Zephyrhills (Note: Formerly Florida Hospital Zephyrhills; renamed in 2019.)	Zephyrhills, Florida	United States	149	1981	
Adventist Health and Rideout	Marysville, California	United States	221		
Adventist Health Bakersfield (Note: Formerly San Joaquin Community Hospital.)	Bakersfield, California	United States	254	1910	
Adventist Health Castle (Note: Formerly Castle Medical Center.)	Kailua, Hawaii	United States	160	1960	
Adventist Health Centre Lilongwe	Lilongwe	Malawi	12	1983	
Adventist Health Clear Lake (Note: Formerly Redbud Community Hospital; also St. Helena Hospital Clearlake.)	Clearlake, California	United States	32		
Adventist Health Delano (Note: Formerly Delano Regional Medical Center.)	Delano, California	United States	156		
Adventist Health Feather River	Paradise, California	United States	101 (Note: Currently closed due to the 2018 fire that destroyed most of Paradise, California.)	1950 (Note: Acquired in 1960.)	
Adventist Health Glendale (Note: Formerly Glendale Adventist Medical Center.)	Glendale, California	United States	515	1905	
Adventist Health Hanford (Note: Formerly Hanford Community Medical Center.)	Hanford, California	United States	173	1965	
Adventist Health Howard Memorial (Note: Formerly Frank R. Howard Memorial.)	Willits, California	United States	25	1928 (Note: Acquired in 1986.)	
Adventist Health Lodi Memorial	Lodi, California	United States	194		
Adventist Health Mendocino Coast (Note: Formerly Mendocino Coast District Hospital.)	Fort Bragg, California	United States	49		
Adventist Health Portland (Note: Formerly Portland Adventist Medical Center.)	Portland, Oregon	United States	302	1893	
Adventist Health Reedley	Reedley, California	United States	49		
Adventist Health Simi Valley (Note: Formerly Simi Valley Hospital.)	Simi Valley, California	United States	144	1965	
Adventist Health Sonora (Note: Formerly Sonora Regional Medical Center.)	Sonora, California	United States	152	1957	
Adventist Health St. Helena (Note: Formerly St. Helena Napa Valley.)	St. Helena, California	United States	151	1878	
Adventist Health Tehachapi Valley (Note: Formerly Tehachapi Hospital.)	Tehachapi, California	United States	25	1934 (Note: Acquired in 2016.)	
Adventist Health Tillamook	Tillamook, Oregon	United States	49	1973	
Adventist Health Tulare	Tulare, California	United States	108		
Adventist Health Ukiah Valley (Note: Formerly Ukiah General Hospital; Ukiah Adventist Hospital; also Ukiah Valley Medical Center.)	Ukiah, California	United States	68	1956 (Note: Acquired in 1978.)	
Adventist Health White Memorial	Los Ángeles, California	United States	353	1913	
Adventist HealthCare Fort Washington Medical Center (Note: Formerly Fort Washington Medical Center.)	Fort Washington, Maryland	United States	28		
Adventist HealthCare Rehabilitation (Note: Formerly Kessler Adventist Rehabilitation Hospital.)	Rockville, Maryland	United States	97	2004	
Adventist HealthCare Shady Grove Medical Center	Rockville, Maryland	United States	329	1979	
Adventist HealthCare White Oak Medical Center (Note: Formerly Washington Adventist Hospital.)	Silver Spring, Maryland	United States	178	1907	
Adventist Hospital - Calbayog (Note: Formerly Calbayog Sanitarium and Hospital.)	Calbayog	Philippines	15	1973	
Adventist Hospital - Cebu (Note: Formerly H.W. Miller Memorial Sanitarium and Hospital.)	Cebu City	Philippines	100	1956	
Adventist Hospital - Davao (Note: Formerly Davao Adventist Hospital.)	Davao City	Philippines	75	1987 (Note: Re-opened in 1997.)	
Adventist Hospital - Palawan (Note: Formerly Palawan Adventist Hospital.)	Puerto Princesa	Philippines	162	1982	
Adventist Hospital - Santiago City (Note: Formerly Cagayan Valley Adventist Hospital.)	Santiago, Isabela	Philippines	50	1959	
Adventist Hospital of Haiti; Hopital Adventiste d'Haiti	Puerto Príncipe	Haiti	43	1978	
Adventist La Grange Memorial Hospital	La Grange, Illinois	United States	186	1955	
Adventist Medical Center	Okinawa	Japan	48	1953	
Adventist Medical Center; Sanatorio Adventista	Mexico City	Mexico	28	1988	
Adventist Medical Center - Bacolod (Note: Formerly Bacolod Adventist Medical Center.)	Bacolod	Philippines	170	1966	
Adventist Medical Center - Iligan City (Note: Formerly Mindanao Sanitarium and Hospital.)	Iligan	Philippines	130	1948	
Adventist Medical Center - Valencia City (Note: Formerly Valencia Sanitarium and Hospital.)	Valencia, Bukidnon	Philippines	100	1993	
Adventist Medical Center Manila (Note: Formerly Manila Sanitarium and Hospital.)	Manila	Philippines	150	1929	
Adventist Natural Life Clinic; Clínica Adventista Vida Natural	São Roque, São Paulo	Brazil		1980	
Aizawl Adventist Hospital	Aizawl, Mizoram	India	50	1996	
Akomaa Memorial Adventist Hospital	Bekwai	Ghana	49	2002	
Ana Stahl Adventist Clinic; Clínica Adventista Ana Stahl	Iquitos	Peru	163		
Andapa Adventist Hospital; Hopital Adventiste d’Andapa	Andapa	Madagascar	64	1976	
Andrews Memorial Hospital	Kingston	Jamaica	60	1945	
Antilles Adventist Hospital; Antillean Adventist Ziekenhuis	Willemstad	Curaçao	80	1970	
Asamang Seventh-day Adventist Hospital	Asamang	Ghana	136	1984	
Asuncion Adventist Sanitarium; Sanatorio Adventista de Asunción	Asunción	Paraguay	45	1959	
Atoifi Adventist Hospital	Honiara	Solomon Islands	67	1966	
Babcock University Teaching Hospital	Ilishan-Remo	Nigeria	146	1972	
Bandar Lampung Adventist Hospital; Rumah Sakit Advent Bandar Lampung	Bandar Lampung	Indonesia	171	1994	
Bandung Adventist Hospital; Rumah Sakit Advent Bandung	Bandung	Indonesia	254	1950	
Batouri Adventist Hospital; Hopital Adventiste de Batouri	Batouri	Cameroon	35	1991	
Belem Adventist Hospital; Hospital Adventista de Belém	Belém	Brazil	196	1953	
Belgrano Adventist Sanitarium; Clínica Adventista Belgrano	Buenos Aires	Argentina	73	1960	
Bella Vista Hospital	Mayagüez	Puerto Rico	203	1954	
Bere Adventist Hospital; Hopital Adventiste de Béré	Béré	Chad	104	1980	
Berlin Hospital; Krankenhaus Waldfriede	Berlin	Germany	210	1920	
Better Living Hospital (Note: Formerly Seventh-day Adventist Health Services.)	Nairobi	Kenya	22	1966	
Blantyre Adventist Hospital	Blantyre	Malawi	45	1957	
Bongo Mission Hospital; Hospital Adventista do Bongo	Mbongo	Angola	16	1927	
Bremang Seventh-day Adventist Hospital	Kumasi	Ghana	32	2016	
Buea Seventh-day Adventist Hospital	Buea	Cameroon	19		
Busan Adventist Hospital; Sahmyook Uiryowon Busan Byungwon	Busan	South Korea	286	1951	
Community Hospital of Seventh-day Adventists	Puerto España	Trinidad and Tobago	25	1948	
Davis Memorial Clinic and Hospital	Georgetown	Guyana	42	1954	
Dominase Adventist Hospital	Bekwai	Ghana	56	1989	
Eden Adventist Hospital; Eden Yoyang Byunggwon	Namyangju	South Korea	195	2001	
Garo Hills Adventist Mission Hospital	West Garo Hills, Meghalaya	India	15	2018	
Gbawe Seventh-day Adventist Hospital	Accra	Ghana	136		
Gimbie Hospital	Gimbi	Ethiopia	76	1948	
Gingoog Sanitarium and Hospital (Note: Formerly Gingoog Community Hospital.)	Gingoog	Philippines	50	1962	
Glei Adventist Eye Hospital	Glei	Togo	36		
Good Hope Clinic; Clínica Good Hope	Lima	Peru	163	1947	
Hart Seventh-day Adventist Hospital	Kumasi	Ghana	29	2019	
Heri Adventist Hospital	Kigoma	Tanzania	72	1949	
Hohenau Adventist Sanitarium; Sanatorio Adventista de Hohenau	Hohenau	Paraguay	27	1965	
Hong Kong Adventist Hospital - Stubbs Road (Note: Formerly Hong Kong Adventist Hospital.)	Happy Valley	Hong Kong	135	1971	
Hong Kong Adventist Hospital - Tsuen Wan (Note: Formerly Tsuen Wan Adventist Hospital.)	Tsuen Wan	Hong Kong	294	1964	
Inisa Community Medical Centre	Ifẹ	Nigeria	48		
Ishaka Adventist Hospital	Ishaka	Uganda	136	1950	
Jengre Seventh-day Adventist Hospital	Jos	Nigeria	53	1947	
Juliaca Adventist Clinic; Clínica Americana de Juliaca	Juliaca	Peru	43	1922	
Kanye Adventist Hospital	Kanye	Botswana	167	1921	
Karachi Adventist Hospital	Karachi	Pakistan	132	1950	
Kendu Adventist Hospital	Kendu Bay	Kenya	170	1925	
Kettering Health Behavioral Medical Center (Note: Formerly Kettering Behavioral Medicine Center; renamed in 2021.)	Dayton, Ohio	United States	60		
Kettering Health Dayton (Note: Formerly Grandview Hospital and Medical Center; renamed in 2021.)	Dayton, Ohio	United States	317	1926	
Kettering Health Greene Memorial (Note: Formerly Greene Memorial Hospital; renamed in 2021.)	Xenia, Ohio	United States	41	1951	
Kettering Health Hamilton (Note: Formerly Fort Hamilton Hospital; renamed in 2021.)	Hamilton, Ohio	United States	310	1929	
Kettering Health Huber (Note: Formerly Huber Health Center; renamed in 2021.)	Huber Heights, Ohio	United States			
Kettering Health Main Campus (Note: Formerly Kettering Medical Center; renamed in 2021.)	Kettering, Ohio	United States	494	1959	
Kettering Health Miamisburg (Note: Formerly Sycamore Medical Center; renamed in 2021.)	Miamisburg, Ohio	United States	180		
Kettering Health Middletown	Middletown, Ohio	United States			
Kettering Health Preble (Note: Formerly Preble County Medical Center; renamed in 2021)	Eaton, Ohio	United States			
Kettering Health Springfield	Springfield, Ohio	United States			
Kettering Health Troy (Note: Formerly Troy Hospital; renamed in 2021.)	Troy, Ohio	United States	28		
Kettering Health Washington Township (Note: Formerly Southview Medical Center; renamed in 2021.)	Washington Township, Ohio	United States	129		
Kinshasa Adventist Health Centre	Kinshasa	Democratic Republic of the Congo	17	1995	
Kobe Adventist Hospital; Kobe Adobenchisuto Byoin	Kobe	Japan	116	1973	
Koforidua Seventh-day Adventist Hospital	Koforidua	Ghana	56		
Koza Adventist Hospital; Hopital Adventiste de Koza	Koza	Cameroon	85	1954	
Kwadaso Seventh-day Adventist Hospital	Kwadaso	Ghana	86	1990	
La Carlota Hospital (Note: Formerly Montemorelos University Hospital.); Hospital La Carlota	Montemorelos	Mexico	17	1946	
La Ligniere Clinic (Note: Formerly Lake Geneva Sanitarium.); Clinique La Ligniere	Gland	Switzerland	94	1905	
Lakeside Adventist Hospital	Kandy	Sri Lanka	42	1965	
Loma Linda University Behavioral Medicine Center	Redlands, California	United States	89	1987	
Loma Linda University Children's Hospital	Loma Linda, California	United States	343	2013	
Loma Linda University Medical Center	Loma Linda, California	United States	533	1905	
Loma Linda University Medical Center East Campus	Loma Linda, California	United States			
Loma Linda University Medical Center Murrieta	Murrieta, California	United States	111		
Loma Linda University Surgical Hospital	Redlands, California	United States			
Los Angeles Adventist Clinic; Clínica Adventista de Los Ángeles	Los Ángeles	Chile	27	1979	
Lusaka Eye Hospital	Lusaka	Zambia	40	2001	
Malamulo Hospital	Thyolo	Malawi	270	1908	
Maluti Adventist Hospital	Mapoteng	Lesotho	120	1951	
Manado Adventist Hospital; Rumah Sakit Advent Manado	Manado	Indonesia	150	2007	
Manaus Adventist Hospital; Hospital Adventista de Manaus	Manaos	Brazil	156	1978	
Medan Adventist Hospital; Rumah Sakit Advent Medan	Medan	Indonesia	174	1969	
METAS Adventist Hospital, Ranchi (Note: Formerly Ranchi Adventist Hospital.)	Ranchi, Jharkhand	India	150	1949	
METAS Adventist Hospital, Surat	Surat, Gujarat	India	300	1936	
METAS Giffard Memorial Hospital (Note: Formerly Giffard Memorial Hospital.)	Nuzvid, Andhra Pradesh	India	250	1925	
Milton Mattison Memorial Hospital	Hapur, Uttar Pradesh	India	20	1984	
Mission Hospital Bangkok	Bangkok	Thailand	120	1937	
Mission Hospital Phuket	Phuket	Thailand	82	1940	
Mugonero Hospital	Kibuye	Rwanda	120	1931	
Mwami Adventist Hospital	Chipata	Zambia	153	1927	
Nagel Memorial Adventist Hospital	Sekondi-Takoradi	Ghana	29	1999	
Nairobi Adventist Hospital (Note: Formerly Karura Seventh-day Adventist Dispensary.)	Nairobi	Kenya	90	2019	
Nicaragua Adventist Hospital; Hospital Adventista de Nicaragua	Estelí	Nicaragua	20	2018	
Nyanchwa Adventist Mission Hospital	Kisii	Kenya	127		
Obuasi Seventh-day Adventist Hospital	Obuasi	Ghana	32	2009	
Ottapalam Seventh-day Adventist Hospital	Ottapalam, Kerala	India	160	1969	
Penang Adventist Hospital; Hospital Adventist	George Town, Penang	Malaysia	259	1924	
Penfigo Adventist Hospital; Hospital Adventista do Pênfigo	Campo Grande	Brazil	131	1950	
Pune Adventist Hospital	Pune, Maharashtra	India	90	1974	
Quito Adventist Clinic; Clínica Adventista de Quito	Quito	Ecuador	21	1960	
River Plate Sanitarium; Sanatorio Adventista del Plata	Libertador San Martín	Argentina	146	1908	
Ruby Nelson Memorial Hospital	Jalandhar, Punjab	India	40	1966	
Sahmyook Adventist Dental Hospital (Note: Formerly Seoul Adventist Dental Hospital.); Sahmyook Chikwa Byungwon	Seoul	South Korea	6	1908	
Sahmyook Medical Center (Note: Formerly Seoul Adventist Hospital.); Sahmyook Uiryowon Seoul Byungwon	Seoul	South Korea	423	1908	
São Paulo Adventist Hospital; Hospital Adventista de São Paulo	São Paulo	Brazil	131	1942	
Scheer Memorial Adventist Hospital	Kathmandu	Nepal	153	1960	
Seventh-day Adventist Cooper Eye Center	Montserrado	Liberia	58	2004	
Seventh-day Adventist Cooper Hospital	Montserrado	Liberia	32	1986	
Seventh-day Adventist Hospital and Motherless Babies’ Home	Aba	Nigeria	74	1984	
Seventh-day Adventist Hospital Ile-Ife	Ifẹ	Nigeria	40	1940	
Seventh-day Adventist Medical Centre (Note: Formerly Bangalore Adventist Hospital.)	Bangalore, Karnataka	India	50	1978	
Silvestre Adventist Hospital - Itaboria; Hospital Adventista Silvestre - Itaborai	Itaboraí	Brazil	20	2014	
Silvestre Adventist Hospital - Rio; Hospital Adventista Silvestre - Rio	Rio de Janeiro	Brazil	118	1948	
Simla Sanitarium and Hospital	Shimla, Himachal Pradesh	India	39	1915 (Note: Reestablished in 1950.)	
Skogli Health and Rehabilitation Center; Skogli Helse-og Rehabiliteringssenter	Lillehammer	Norway	109	1946	
Soin Medical Center	Beavercreek, Ohio	United States	176	2009	
Songa Adventist Hospital; Hôpital Adventiste de Songa	Kamina	Democratic Republic of the Congo	76	1927	
Southeast Hospital; Hospital del Sureste	Villahermosa	Mexico	36	1975	
Sydney Adventist Hospital	Wahroonga, New South Wales	Australia	599	1903	
Taiwan Adventist Hospital; Tai An Yi Yuen	Taipei	Taiwan	375	1955	
Tamale Seventh-day Adventist Hospital	Tamale	Ghana	146		
Texas Health Huguley Hospital Fort Worth South	Burleson, Texas	United States	59		
Texas Health Hospital Mansfield	Mansfield, Texas	United States			
Thanjavur Adventist Hospital	Thanjavur, Tamil Nadu	India	10	1996	
Tokyo Adventist Hospital; Tokyo Eisei Byoin	Tokyo	Japan	186	1929	
UChicago Medicine AdventHealth Bolingbrook (Note: Formerly AMITA Health Adventist Medical Center Bolingbrook; renamed in 2022. Formerly AdventHealth Bolingbrook; renamed in 2023.)	Bolingbrook, Illinois	United States	134	2008	
UChicago Medicine AdventHealth GlenOaks (Note: Formerly AMITA Health Adventist Medical Center GlenOaks; renamed in 2022. Formerly AdventHealth GlenOaks; renamed in 2023.)	Glendale Heights, Illinois	United States	138	1980	
UChicago Medicine AdventHealth Hinsdale (Note: Formerly AMITA Health Adventist Medical Center Hinsdale; renamed in 2022. Formerly AdventHealth Hinsdale; renamed in 2023.)	Hinsdale, Illinois	United States	261	1904	
UChicago Medicine AdventHealth La Grange (Note: Formerly AMITA Health Adventist Medical Center La Grange; renamed in 2022. Formerly AdventHealth La Grange; renamed in 2023.)	La Grange, Illinois	United States	177		
Valley of the Angels Hospital; Hospital Adventista Valle de Ángeles	Tegucigalpa	Honduras	30	1974	
Valley View Adventist Hospital - Techiman Campus	Techiman	Ghana	60	2016	
Valley View University Hospital	Oyibi	Ghana	25	2008	
Venezuela Adventist Hospital; Fundación Clínica Adventista	Barquisimeto	Venezuela	8		
Vista Clinic Psychiatric Hospital	Centurion	South Africa	158	1984	
Vista del Jardin Adventist Medical Center; Centro Médico Vista del Jardín	Santo Domingo	Dominican Republic	65	2007	
Waterloo Seventh-day Adventist Hospital	Waterloo	Sierra Leone	85		
Wiamoase Seventh-day Adventist Hospital	Wiamoase	Ghana	40	1996	
Yeosu Sanitarium and Hospital; Yeosu Yoyang Byungwon	Yeosu	South Korea	81	1996	
Yuka Adventist Hospital	Kalabo	Zambia	120	1953	

== Former Adventist hospitals ==
Entrance Building, Auckland Adventist Hospital

- Auckland Adventist Hospital - Saint Heliers, Auckland. It opened in early 1974. The hospital's capacity varied between six and 67 at different times. It was sold in 1999 by the Trans-Tasman Union Conference due to financial difficulties.
- Battle Creek Sanitarium - Battle Creek, (sold to the federal government and became Percy Jones Army Hospital, currently it goes by the name Hart–Dole–Inouye Federal Center)
- Benghazi Adventist Hospital - Benghazi, (closed by the military government)
- Boston Regional Medical Center - Stoneham, (sold to Gutierrez Company)
- Central Texas Medical Center - San Marcos, (sold to Christus Santa Rosa Health System by AdventHealth and renamed CHRISTUS Santa Rosa Hospital-San Marcos)
- Chongchen Hospital - China, (closed by the Chinese Communist Party)
- Dalcross Adventist Hospital -Killara, (closed by Adventist HealthCare Limited)
- Florida Hospital Oceanside - Ormond Beach, demolished after being damaged by Hurricane Irma.
- Fushan Hospital - China, (closed by the Chinese Communist Party)
- Guangzhou Sanitarium - Guangzhou, (closed by the Chinese Communist Party)
- Hackettstown Regional Medical Center - Hackettstown, (sold to Atlantic Health System by Adventist HealthCare and renamed Hackettstown Medical Center)
- Henan Hospital - China, (closed by the Chinese Communist Party)
- Jellico Community Hospital - Jellico, (formerly operated by Adventist Health System)
- Knowlton Sanitarium - Knowlton, (sold)
- Kondeng Hospital - China, (closed by the Chinese Communist Party)
- McClelan Memorial Hospital - Riverside, New Brunswick, (closed or sold)
- Naning Hospital - China, (closed by the Chinese Communist Party)
- North China Sanitarium - China, (closed by the Chinese Communist Party)
- Northwest Sanitarium - China, (closed by the Chinese Communist Party)
- North York Branson Hospital - Toronto, (sold to North York General Hospital and renamed Branson Ambulatory Care Centre)
- Paradise Valley Hospital - National City, (sold to Prime Healthcare Services) by Adventist Health
- Parkview Adventist Medical Center - Brunswick, (sold to Mid Coast Health Services and renamed Parkview Medical Center)
- Rangoon Seventh-day Adventist Hospital - Yangon, (closed by the military government, currently Yangon ENT Hospital
- Rest Haven Hospital & Sanitarium - Sidney, (moved from an island to the mainland and is now operated as Rest Haven Lodge a retirement facility)
- Saigon Adventist Hospital - Ho Chi Minh, (closed by the Communist government and now owned by Phú Nhuanân Red Cross Association)
- Shanghai Sanitarium - Shanghai, (closed by the Chinese Communist Party)
- Shenyang Sanitarium - Shenyang, (closed by the Chinese Communist Party)
- Skodsborg Sanitarium - Skodsborg, (sold to Augustinus Foundation, currently it goes by the name Skodsborg Spa Hotel)
- Taishan Hospital - Taishan, (closed by the Chinese Communist Party and renamed Taishan City People's Hospital)
- Takoma Regional Hospital - Greeneville, (sold by Adventist Health System to Wellmont Health System)
- Tempe Community Hospital - Tempe, (sold by Adventist Health to Iasis Healthcare then renamed Tempe St. Luke's Hospital)
- Walla Walla General Hospital - Walla Walla, (closed by Adventist Health)
- Warburton Hospital - Warburton, (sold)
- Wei Chou Hospital - China, (closed by the Chinese Communist Party)
- Wuhan Sanitarium - Wuhan, (closed by the Chinese Communist Party)
- Youngberg Memorial Adventist Hospital - Singapore, (closed and was bought by the Salvation Army and turned into a thrift store)

== See also ==
- List of Seventh-day Adventist colleges and universities
- List of Seventh-day Adventist secondary schools
