= Egypt Lake-Leto, Florida =

- Census-designated place
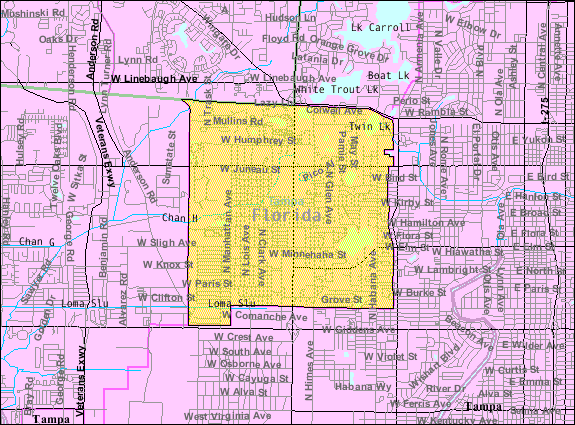
- U.S. Census map of Egypt Lake-Leto CDP, Florida

- Location in Hillsborough County and the state of Florida
- Coordinates: 28°00′35″N 82°30′26″W
- Country: United States
- State: Florida
- County: Hillsborough

Area
  - Total: 6.23 sq mi (16.14 km^{2})
  - Land: 5.91 sq mi (15.30 km^{2})
  - Water: 0.32 sq mi (0.84 km^{2})
- Elevation: 33 ft (10 m)

Population (2020)
  - Total: 36,644
  - Density: 6,202.5/sq mi (2,394.79/km^{2})
- Time zone: UTC-5 (Eastern (EST))
  - Summer (DST): UTC-4 (EDT)
- ZIP Code: 33614
- Area codes: 813, 656
- FIPS code: 12-20108
- GNIS feature ID: 1853249

Egypt Lake-Leto is a census-designated place (CDP) in an unincorporated part of Hillsborough County, Florida, United States. The CDP is located just north of Tampa International Airport. It is part of the Tampa Bay area. As of the 2020 US census, the population had 36,644 residents.

== Geography ==
Egypt Lake-Leto is located in northwestern Hillsborough County 7 miles (11 km) northwest of downtown Tampa. The elevation for the CDP is 45 feet (14 m) above sea level.

According to the United States Census Bureau, the CDP has a total area of 6.2 square miles (16.1 km^{2}), of which 5.9 square miles (15.3 km^{2}) are land and 0.3 square miles (0.8 km^{2}), or 5.16%, are water.

The Egypt Lake-Leto CDP contains the communities of Egypt Lake, Leto, and West Park Estates.

== Demographics ==
Historical population
Census	Pop.	Note	%±
1970	16,014		—
1980	20,035		25.1%
1990	24,927		24.4%
2000	32,782		31.5%
2010	35,282		7.6%
2020	36,644		3.9%

=== Racial and ethnic composition ===
Egypt Lake-Leto CDP, Florida – Racial and ethnic composition Note: the US Census treats Hispanic/Latino as an ethnic category. This table excludes Latinos from the racial categories and assigns them to a separate category. Hispanics/Latinos may be of any race.
Race / Ethnicity (NH = Non-Hispanic)	Pop 2000	Pop 2010	Pop 2020	% 2000	% 2010	% 2020
White alone (NH)	13,754	9,417	7,014	41.96%	26.69%	19.14%
Black or African American alone (NH)	2,251	2,939	2,569	6.87%	8.33%	7.01%
Native American or Alaska Native alone (NH)	65	46	37	0.20%	0.13%	0.10%
Asian alone (NH)	1,071	1,258	1,541	3.27%	3.57%	4.21%
Native Hawaiian or Pacific Islander alone (NH)	16	8	2	0.05%	0.02%	0.01%
Other race alone (NH)	71	66	175	0.22%	0.19%	0.48%
Mixed race or Multiracial (NH)	539	391	766	1.64%	1.11%	2.09%
Hispanic or Latino (any race)	15,015	21,157	24,540	45.80%	59.97%	66.97%
Total	32,782	35,282	36,644	100.00%	100.00%	100.00%

=== 2020 census ===
As of the 2020 census, Egypt Lake-Leto had a population of 36,644. The median age was 38.8 years. 19.0% of residents were under the age of 18 and 15.0% of residents were 65 years of age or older. For every 100 females there were 93.0 males, and for every 100 females age 18 and over there were 91.0 males age 18 and over.

100.0% of residents lived in urban areas, while 0.0% lived in rural areas.

There were 14,386 households in Egypt Lake-Leto, of which 29.8% had children under the age of 18 living in them. Of all households, 36.7% were married-couple households, 21.0% were households with a male householder and no spouse or partner present, and 32.2% were households with a female householder and no spouse or partner present. About 27.0% of all households were made up of individuals and 8.1% had someone living alone who was 65 years of age or older.

There were 15,061 housing units, of which 4.5% were vacant. The homeowner vacancy rate was 1.1% and the rental vacancy rate was 4.6%.

Racial composition as of the 2020 census
Race	Number	Percent
White	12,909	35.2%
Black or African American	3,010	8.2%
American Indian and Alaska Native	173	0.5%
Asian	1,562	4.3%
Native Hawaiian and Other Pacific Islander	12	0.0%
Some other race	6,078	16.6%
Two or more races	12,900	35.2%

=== American Community Survey estimates ===
According to the 2017–2021 American Community Survey 5-year estimates, there were 1,065 veterans in Egypt Lake-Leto, 44.8% of residents were foreign born, and the average household size was 2.57 persons.

The owner-occupied housing rate was 45.0%. The median value of owner-occupied housing units was $212,400, with median monthly owner costs of $1,302 with a mortgage and $427 without a mortgage. The median gross rent was $1,126. In terms of technology and education, 95.7% of households had a computer and 92.6% had a broadband Internet subscription, 80.3% of residents 25 years and older were high school graduates or higher, and 21.4% had a bachelor's degree or higher. The median household income was $48,240 and the per capita income was $25,425, while 17.4% of the population lived below the poverty threshold.

=== 2010 census ===
As of the 2010 census, there were 35,282 people, 13,600 households, and 7,972 families residing in the CDP.

== Education ==
The area of Egypt Lake-Leto is served by Hillsborough County Schools.

=== Public elementary ===
- Crestwood Elementary School
- Egypt Lake Elementary School
- Twin Lakes Elementary School

=== Public middle ===
- Pierce Middle School

=== Public high ===
- Alonso High School
- Chamberlain High School
- Leto High School

== Healthcare ==
The only hospital in Egypt Lake-Leto is AdventHealth Carrollwood.
