= DPR Construction =

American construction firm

Coordinates: 37.504891°N 122.250911°W

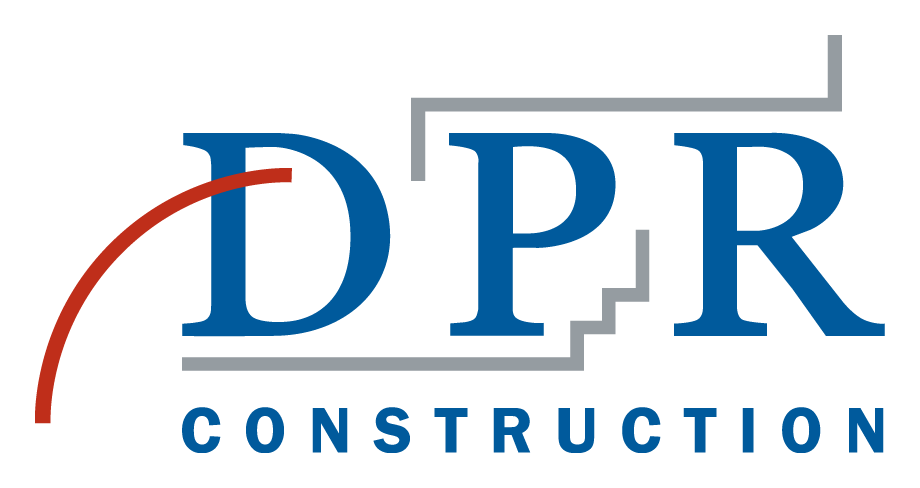
- Type: General Contractor, Construction Management
- Founded: 1990
- Founder: Doug Woods, Peter Nosler, Ron Davidowski
- Headquarters: Redwood City, California, United States
- Number of locations: 32
- Area served: United States, South Korea, Singapore, Europe (Benelux, DACH and Nordic regions)
- Key people: George Pfeffer, Mark Whitson, Angela Floyd
- Services: Construction management; building information modeling; virtual design and construction; integrated project delivery
- Revenue: $10.8 billion (2024)
- Number of employees: 11,000
- Website: www.dpr.com

DPR Construction Company is a commercial general contractor and construction management firm based in Redwood City, California. The privately-held, employee-owned company has 30 offices throughout the United States and specializes in projects for technology, life sciences, healthcare, higher education and commercial office markets. Its international offices are located in Europe and Asia.

DPR specializes in building complex, technically demanding facilities across its core markets, frequently integrating advanced methods such as Building Information Modeling (BIM) and Virtual Design and Construction (VDC) to plan and execute projects.

== History ==
In July 1990, DPR Construction was co-founded in Redwood City, California, by Doug Woods, Peter Nosler and Ron Davidowski (the D, the P, and the R) with $750,000 of pooled resources. By the end of its first year, DPR had 10 employees. Among the company's earliest projects were a six-month, $4.5 million tenant-improvement project for Argo Systems in Sunnyvale, California, which was followed by a $43 million wafer fabrication project for Rockwell International in Los Angeles, California.

In 1999, a year before the U.S. Green Building Council (USGBC) launched its Leadership in Energy and Environmental Design (LEED) certification program, DPR was awarded its first green project: a 110,000-sq.-ft. campus for Aspect Communications. Designed by William McDonough + Partners and Form4 Architects and completed in 2001, with the headquarters in San Jose, California.

In 2003, DPR's Sacramento regional office became the first privately owned LEED-certified building in California's Central Valley. In 2010, DPR's San Diego regional office became the first commercial building to achieve both LEED-NC Platinum and net-zero energy status in San Diego.

In late January 2013, DPR purchased Atlanta-based Hardin Construction Company. On April 19, DPR completed the acquisition of Hardin. The following month, DPR's LEED-NC Platinum Phoenix regional office became the largest building in the world to achieve Net-Zero Energy Building certification from the International Living Future Institute's Living Building Challenge. Later in October, the David and Lucile Packard Foundation Corporate Headquarters built by DPR achieved Net-Zero Energy Building certification from the International Living Future Institute's Living Building Challenge.

In 2014, DPR's San Francisco regional office became the city's first net-zero-energy-designed office building.

In early August 2021, DPR purchased Colorado Springs-based GE Johnson Construction Company. The acquisition of GE Johnson Construction Company and its subsidiary H. W. Houston Construction was finalized on September 30. In late January 2025, GE Construction Company rebranded to DPR Construction.

The California State Teachers' Retirement System (CalSTRS), the largest teachers’ retirement fund in the United States, filed a lawsuit against DPR Construction in the California Superior Court for Sacramento County on July 1, 2024. In November of the same year, a Sacramento County Superior Court judge issued a tentative ruling that DPR and the other named defendants did nothing to suggest they engaged in a conspiracy to inflate prices.

On December 4, 2024, Meta Platforms announced that DPR Construction, along with Turner Construction and Mortenson, were awarded a $10 billion contract to build the company’s latest data center in Richland Parish, Louisiana.

In 2024, an ENR Regional Best Projects award was also given to the firm for its work on the United Therapeutics Phase 5 cGMP Warehouse in North Carolina.

== Organization and Culture ==
There are approximately 11,000 staff members in the company. DPR Construction embraces a model of shared leadership by emphasizing roles and responsibilities instead of job titles and positions. As the construction industry is challenged by a need to hire more people, DPR helps new entrants into the industry by developing their own training programs. The company has also partnered with Job Corps to provide on-the-job training at DPR Construction jobsites.

DPR Construction was one of the companies that established Construction Inclusion Week, an annual awareness campaign aimed at attracting and retaining new talent in the construction industry.

In 2024, DPR was added to Fast Company’s list of 100 Best Workplaces for Innovators. DPR has been included in Fortune's "100 Best Companies to Work For" list multiple times, with its rank reaching as high as #13 based on employee surveys and cultural audits conducted by the Great Place to Work Institute.

The company serves customers nationally and internationally through regional offices around the country. DPR has 30 office locations throughout the U.S., international offices in Seoul, South Korea, and several in Europe, and is headquartered in Redwood City, California.

== Select award-winning projects ==
- Arizona State University, McCord Hall at W. P. Carey School of Business (Tempe, Arizona)
- Autodesk, One Market Customer Briefing Center and Office (San Francisco, California)
- The Biodesign Institute at Arizona State University, Building A and B (Tempe, Arizona)
- Clif Bar, Headquarters (Emeryville, California)
- DPR Construction, Net-Zero Energy Phoenix Regional Office (Phoenix, Arizona)
- DPR Construction, Net-Zero Energy San Francisco Regional Office (San Francisco, California)
- David and Lucile Packard Foundation, Corporate Headquarters (Los Altos, California)
- eBay, Salt Lake City Data Center (Salt Lake City, Utah)
- Facebook, Forest City Data Center (Forest City, North Carolina)
- Facebook, Prineville Data Center (Prineville, Oregon)
- Genentech, Oceanside Production Operations (Oceanside, California)
- Genentech, Cell Culture Plant 2 (CCP-2) (Vacaville, California)
- Library of Congress, National Audio-Visual Conservation Center (Culpeper, Virginia)
- Palo Alto Medical Foundation, an affiliate of Sutter Health, Campus: (Mountain View, California)
- Palomar Medical Center, (Escondido, California)
- Sutter Health, Eden Medical Center (Castro Valley, California)
- Tampa International Airport, Baggage Claim Renovation and Expansion; Airport Cargo Service Road, Tunnel and Related Work; Main Terminal Modernization (Tampa, Florida)
- UCSF Medical Center at Mission Bay (San Francisco, California)
- UCSF Medical Center at Parnassus, Ray and Dagmar Dolby Regeneration Medicine Building (San Francisco, California)
