= Private hospital =

Business term

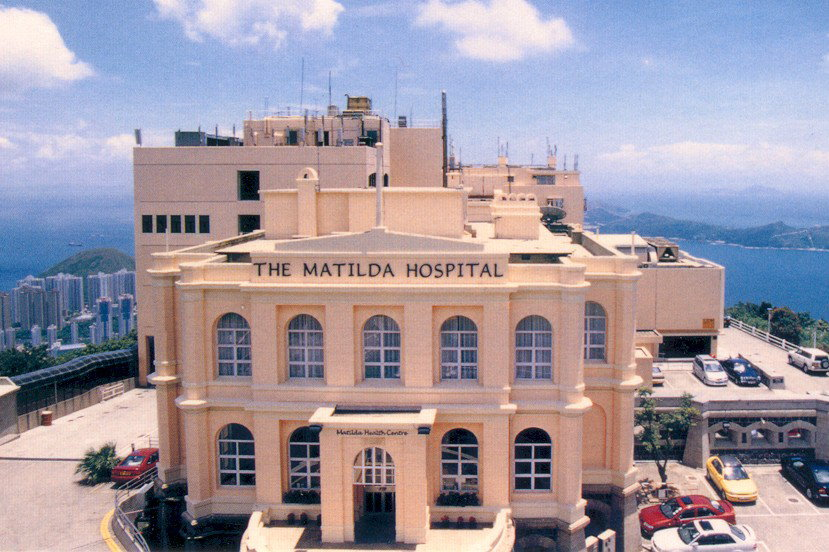
Matilda International Hospital is a private, non-profit hospital

A private hospital is a hospital not owned by the government, including for-profit and non-profit hospitals. Funding is by patients themselves ("self-pay"), by insurers, or by foreign embassies. Private hospitals are commonly part, albeit in varying degrees, of the majority of healthcare systems around the world.

== United Kingdom ==
In the United Kingdom private hospitals are distinguished from National Health Service (NHS) institutions. However, many National Health Service hospitals provide some privately funded care in Private Patient Units (PPUs), and are included as private hospitals for competition law purposes. As of December 2018, there were an estimated 556 hospitals with over 9,000 beds providing privately funded care in the UK, in addition to many more private clinics providing outpatient services. Around 812,000 privately funded admissions occurred in 2017, comprising same-day treatment ("day-case") or overnight stays ("inpatient"). Of these, 714,000 took place in independent hospitals, and 97,000 in NHS facilities. Additionally, some 546,000 NHS-funded admissions were conducted at independent (private) hospitals. Privately funded care, and private hospitals, are most prevalent in London and the South East of England. In 1979 there were about 4,000 beds in UK private hospitals

== United States ==
According to the 2014 American Hospital Association Annual Survey, there are 5,686 hospitals in the United States. Of that total, 2,904 are public hospitals, and 1,060 are private. There are a total of 795,603 staffed beds in public hospitals and 118,910 staffed beds in private hospitals.

Public hospitals had about 33.6 million admissions annually while private hospitals had about 1.8 million admissions annually.

There are 126 hospitals in New York City aside from specialized state and Federal institutions. Of these, 32, with a total of 4,401 beds, are proprietary, or profit-making, hospitals; 75 are voluntary hospitals operated by private groups on a nonprofit basis, and 19 are municipal hospitals operated by the city's Health and Hospitals Corporation.

== China ==
A network of 8,000 medical facilities named Putian was described in 2018 as having "little government oversight." "American financial firms like Sequoia Capital and Morgan Stanley have invested billions of dollars" in this network.

== See also ==
- For-profit hospital
- Non-profit hospital
- Public hospital
- Walk-in clinic
- Private Hospitals Association (Jordan)
