= Non-profit hospital =

Type of hospital found in the USA

A non-profit hospital is a hospital that does not make profits for owners of the hospital from the funds collected for patient services. The owners of non-profit hospitals are often a charitable organization or non-profit corporations. Fees for service above the cost of service are reinvested in the hospital. Other funding types for hospitals include public hospitals and for-profit hospitals.

== In the United States ==
The hospital industry in the United States includes a mix of ownership forms. Non-profit hospitals are the most common type, but for-profit and government hospitals also play substantial roles. A non-profit hospital, or not-for-profit hospital, is a hospital which is organized as a non-profit corporation. Non-profit hospitals are mostly funded by charity, religion or research/educational funds.

A non-profit hospital, or not-for-profit hospital, is a hospital which is organized as a non-profit corporation. Based on their charitable purpose and most often affiliated with a religious denomination they are a traditional means of delivering medical care in the United States. Non-profit hospitals are distinct from government owned public hospitals and privately owned for-profit hospitals.

Non-profit hospitals do not pay federal income or state and local property taxes, and in return they benefit the community. The various exemptions given to non-profit hospitals get scrutinized by policymakers, with the argument being whether they provide community benefits that justify forgone government tax revenues. Courts generally have rejected challenges to the tax-free status of non-profit hospitals by indigent patients who are forced to pay for services on the grounds that the question is a matter for the IRS and that the indigent patients lack standing.

In 2003, of the roughly 3,900 nonfederal, short-term, acute care general hospitals in the United States, the majority—about 62 percent—were nonprofit. The rest included government hospitals (20 percent) and for-profit hospitals (18 percent). In exchange for tax-exemptions, estimated to total $12.6 billion in 2002, nonprofit hospitals are expected to provide community benefits.

=== By state ===
In the State of New York, all traditional hospitals must be non-profit by law. Exceptions include outpatient surgery centers which can be for-profit.

California Health & Safety Code section 1206(I) exempts from licensure clinics operated by a nonprofit corporation (such as a medical foundation) if they meet certain requirements, including conducting medical research and health education, and providing medical care through a group of 40 or more independent contractor physicians and surgeons. The foundation's board must consist of physician, hospital and local community representatives, with affiliated physicians making up no more than 20 percent of the board's members.

It is for these reasons that organizations such as the Cedars-Sinai Medical Center restructured in 1994 to become the Cedars-Sinai Health System, comprising the Cedars-Sinai Medical Care Foundation, Physician-Hospital Organization and Cedars-Sinai Medical Center."
