= Orlando Health Bayfront Hospital =

Hospital in St. Petersburg, Florida

Coordinates: 27°45′48″N 82°38′36″W

- Orlando Health
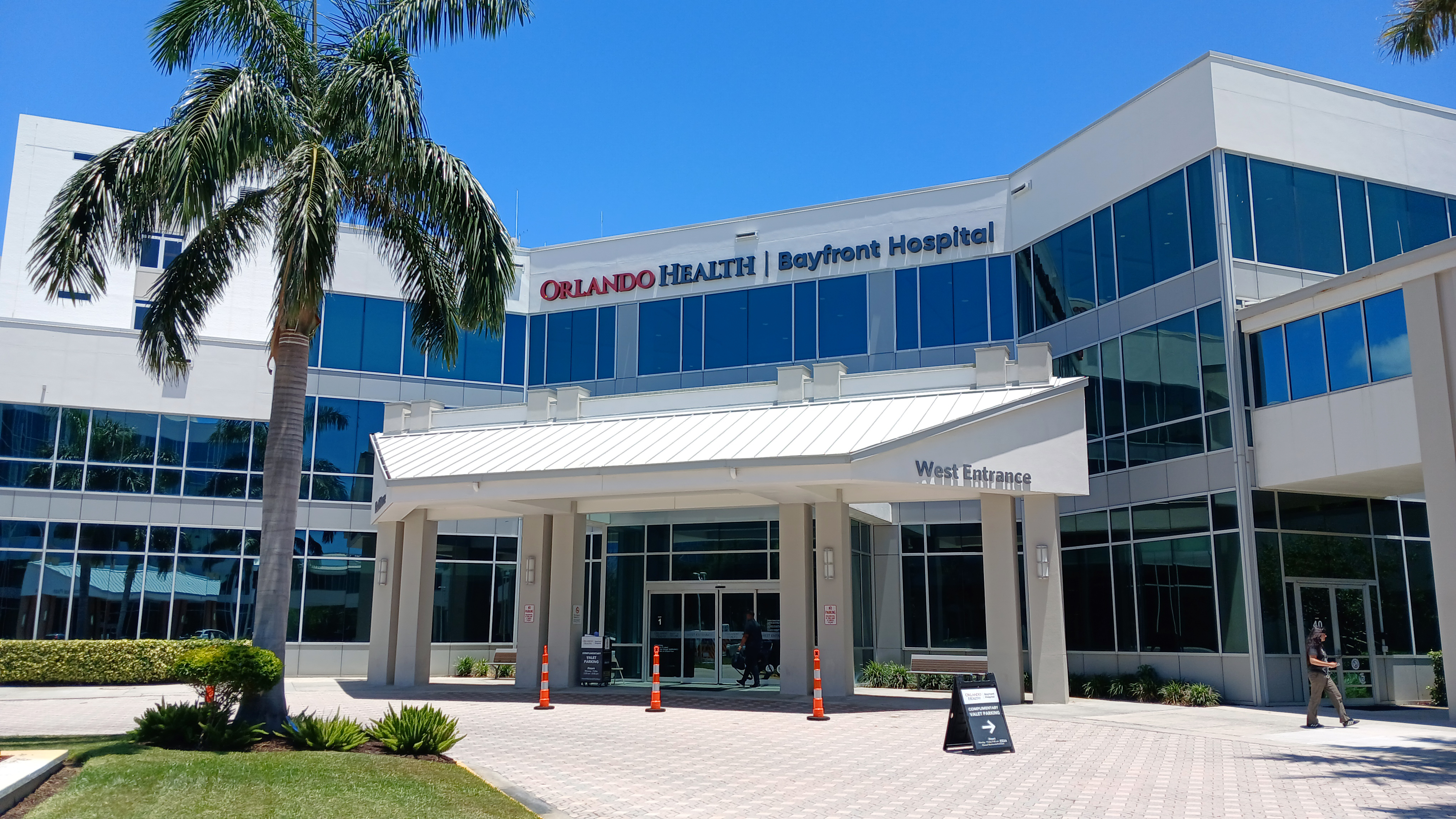
- The hospital's West Entrance building in 2026

Geography
- Location: 701 6th St. S., St. Petersburg, Florida, United States

Organization
- Care system: Orlando Health

Services
- Emergency department: Level II Trauma Center
- Beds: 480

Links
- Website: https://www.bayfrontstpete.com
- Lists: Hospitals in Florida

Orlando Health Bayfront Hospital, formerly known as Bayfront Health St. Petersburg, is an Orlando Health hospital in St. Petersburg, Florida. Orlando Health Bayfront Hospital is Pinellas County's only Level II Trauma Center and St. Petersburg's longest-standing hospital.

Orlando Health Bayfront is a not-for-profit teaching hospital that provides comprehensive services in trauma and emergency care; orthopaedics; obstetrics and gynecology; cardiac medicine and surgery (specializing in valve surgery); neurosciences, with a dedicated epilepsy center; sports medicine; and surgery and rehabilitation. More than 550 physicians are on staff with specialties ranging from open-heart surgery to fertility treatment.

It is also home to Bayflite Emergency Helicopter Transport System, a trauma response helicopter transport program. The largest hospital-based flight program in the Southeastern United States, Bayflite was established in 1986 and was the first flight program in Florida to carry lifesaving blood on every flight.

Orlando Health Bayfront is nationally accredited by the Joint Commission and also maintains the following accreditations and certifications: Level II Trauma Center, Level III Regional Perinatal Intensive Care Center, Primary Stroke Center, Chest Pain Center and Hip & Knee Replacement.

== History ==
=== 1910–1970: Good Samaritan Hospital, and Mound Park/Mound Park Memorial Hospital ===
Orlando Health Bayfront Hospital was preceded by a five-room public hospital called Good Samaritan Hospital, built in 1910 on the site of the current facility. In 1913, the Augusta Memorial Hospital was constructed on a site adjacent to Good Samaritan Hospital. Around 1923, the hospital was expanded with a new facility that offered 60 beds, and was named Mound Park Hospital after mounds built by the Tocobaga, which were either nearby or at the site of the hospital.

Over the following decades, expansions continued to be added to the hospital, and in June 1968, an agreement was reached that the 551-bed Mound Park Hospital would be leased by the City of St. Petersburg to Bayfront Medical Center Inc. for a 25-year period. The lease term began on October 1, 1970 (the start of the city's fiscal year), and was accompanied by the hospital being renamed to Mound Park Memorial Hospital. In 1970, the hospital was again renamed, to Bayfront Medical Center.

=== 1980s–present: Bayfront Medical Center; under Community Health System, and Orlando Health ===
In the 1980s, significant restructuring and renovations took place on the hospital, including the addition of a new emergency and trauma center, new units for intensive and cardiac care, a new neurology unit, and new perinatal and nursery facilities. In February 1985, it was announced that the hospital earned the designation of a Level II Trauma Center from the Florida Department of Health and Rehabilitative Services, making Bayfront the first Level II Trauma Center in south Florida and the only such facility in Pinellas County; the supporting Bayflite Emergency Helicopter Transport System, a trauma response helicopter service for the Tampa Bay area, was established the following year.

In October 2012, plans were announced to merge Bayfront Medical Center with Health Management Associates and Shands HealthCare. The merger transformed Bayfront Medical Center into a for-profit facility and created a new integrated care delivery network with six other HMA hospitals, including Brooksville Regional Hospital, Spring Hill Regional Hospital, Venice Regional Medical Center, Charlotte Regional Medical Center, Peace River Regional Medical Center, and Pasco Regional Medical Center, with Bayfront being the flagship hospital. The deal closed in mid-2013, and Bayfront joined the HMA family of hospitals. Bayfront Health was acquired by Community Health System (CHS) in early 2014 along with other HMA facilities.

In September 2015, it was announced that Bayfront had started a partnership with the University of South Florida (USF) in Tampa, involving the contracting of USF Health physicians to provide specialty services to patients in the hospital's service area. The affiliation between Bayfront and USF formally ended in June 2019 after three years. Dan Vukmer, a USF Health official, stated that, "CHS has their own objective of selling off hospitals. We're looking for a more permanent partner that's more dedicated to our clinical and research goals"; John McLain, CEO of Bayfront Health St. Petersburg, cited "physician and provider recruitment becoming a key element of our strategic direction."

On October 1, 2020, Bayfront Health St. Petersburg was acquired by not-for-profit Orlando Health, after the St. Petersburg City Council approved the transaction in July 2020. At the time of acquisition, Community Health Systems owned 80% of the hospital, with the other 20% owned by the non-profit Foundation for a Healthy St. Petersburg; both shares were sold to Orlando Health, giving Orlando Health complete ownership. The lease term with Orlando Health is set for 50 years, with two 10-year options. On March 1, 2024, the hospital was renamed Orlando Health Bayfront Hospital.
