= AdventHealth Port Charlotte =

- AdventHealth
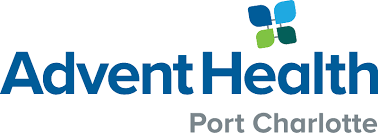

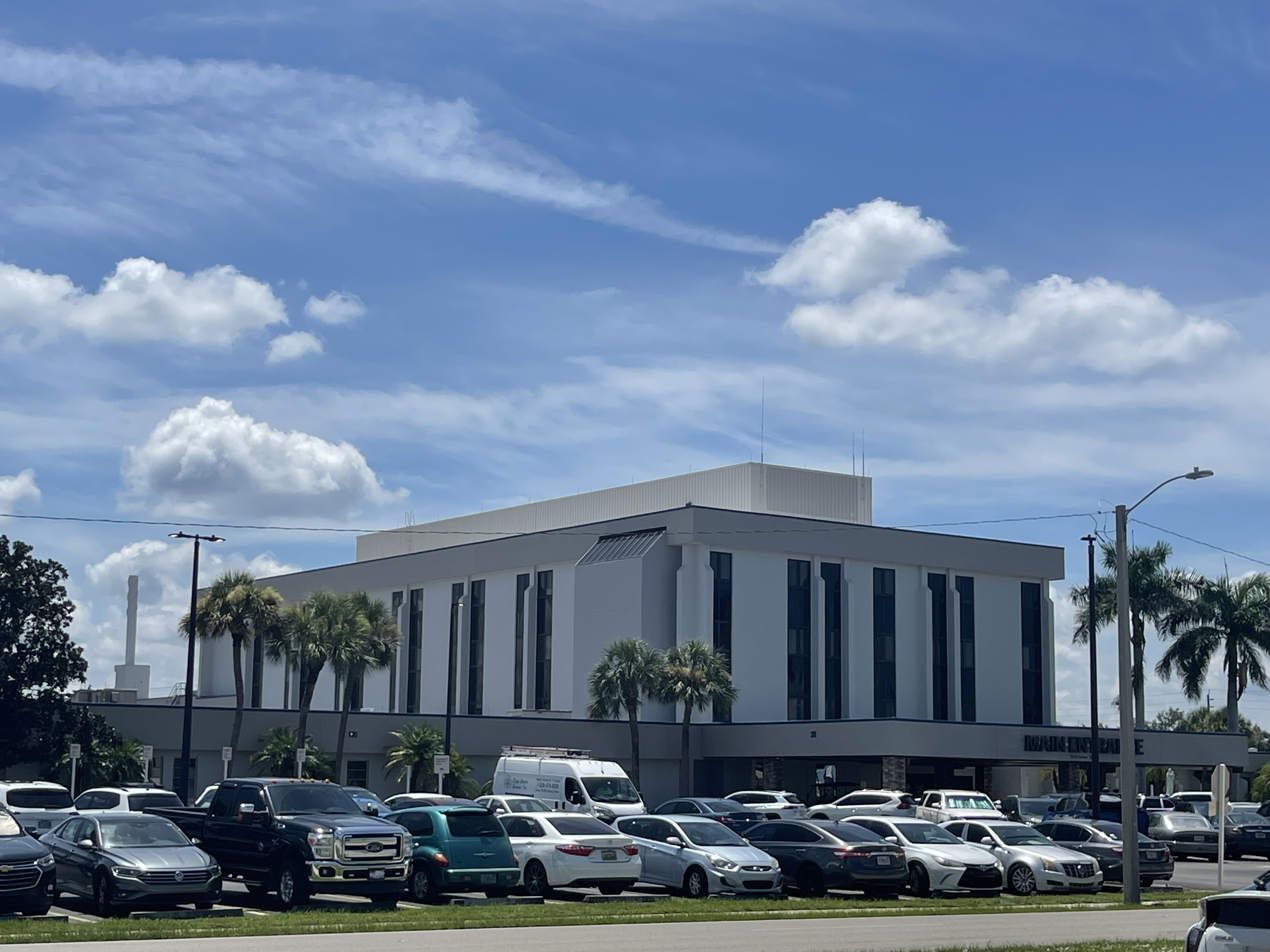

Geography
- Location: 2500 Harbor Boulevard, Port Charlotte, Florida, United States

Organization
- Care system: Private hospital
- Type: General hospital
- Religious affiliation: Seventh-day Adventist Church

Services
- Standards: Joint Commission
- Emergency department: Yes
- Beds: 247

Helipads
- Helipad: Aeronautical chart and airport information for FA01 at SkyVector

History
- Former names: Bon Secours St. Joseph's Hospital; Peace River Regional Medical Center; Bayfront Health Port Charlotte; Shorepoint Health Port Charlotte
- Constructed: 1962
- Opened: June 4, 1962

Links
- Website: www.adventhealth.com/hospital/adventhealth-port-charlotte
- Lists: Hospitals in Florida

AdventHealth Port Charlotte, Inc. is a non-profit hospital campus in Port Charlotte, Florida, United States owned by AdventHealth. The medical facility is a tertiary that has multiple specialties. The hospital was purchased from Community Health Systems in March 2025.

== History ==
In 1962, Saint Joseph's Hospital was founded by the Felician Sisters and was built by General Development Corporation for the Catholic Church. On June 4, 1962, it opened with 50 hospital beds. In 1987, Bon Secours purchased Saint Joseph's Hospital.

In early August 2004, Bon Secours announced that it would sell St. Joseph's Hospital to Health Management Associates, there were other hospital networks interested in the hospital including HCA. In 2005, Health Management Associates renamed St. Joseph's Hospital to Peace River Regional Medical Center. In March 2011, construction began on the Peace River Heart Institute for $25 million. The two-story addition was built on top of the emergency department. It opened on January 18, 2012, with three surgical suites, four catheterization laboratories, a coronary care unit with nineteen beds, a post-interventional cardiac cath unit with sixteen beds, also a pre-and post-interventional cardiac holding with eight beds.

On June 27, 2013, Health Management Associates announced that Peace River Regional Medical Center would be rebranding to Bayfront Health Port Charlotte as part of a campaign to merge HMA-owned hospitals from Brooksville to Punta Gorda into a regional network of hospitals, following the purchase of a majority state in Bayfront Medical Center by HMA. On July 30, Community Health Systems agreed to purchase Health Management Associates for $7.6 billion. On January 15, 2014, the hospital changed its name to Bayfront Health Port Charlotte. On January 24, 2014, the Federal Trade Commission approved the merger of Health Management Associates with Community Health Systems and two days later the merger was completed.

On November 30, 2021, Bayfront Health Port Charlotte was rebranded as ShorePoint Health Port Charlotte, along with ShorePoint Health Punta Gorda and ShorePoint Health Venice. After Hurricane Ian hit Florida in late September 2022, ShorePoint Health Port Charlotte was the only hospital that was open in a 30-mile radius. On November 22, 2024, AdventHealth signed a definitive agreement to purchase ShorePoint Health Port Charlotte from Community Health Systems; also in the purchase agreement was ShorePoint Health Punta Gorda and its assets, the total sale price for the properties was $265 million. On March 1, 2025, AdventHealth began operating the hospital as AdventHealth Port Charlotte after purchasing ShorePoint Health for $260 million.

On August 14, 2026, AdventHealth Medical Group Neurosurgery at Port Charlotte opened.

== Hurricane evacuations ==
On August 14, 2004, St. Joseph's Hospital had parts of its roof ripped off by Hurricane Charley.

On October 8, 2024, the hospital was evacuated due to Hurricane Milton. The hospital's patients were moved by ambulance to Physicians Regional Healthcare System in Naples.

== See also ==
- List of Seventh-day Adventist hospitals
