= List of hospitals in Florida =

This is a list of hospitals in the U.S. state of Florida.

== Acute care hospitals ==
According to the American Hospital Directory, there were 325 hospitals in Florida in 2020.

Hospital name	City	County	Inpatient beds	Parent system	Notes
AdventHealth Altamonte Springs	Altamonte Springs	Seminole		AdventHealth	Formerly Florida Hospital Altamonte; part of AdventHealth Orlando
AdventHealth Apopka	Apopka	Orange		AdventHealth	Formerly Florida Hospital Apopka; part of AdventHealth Orlando
AdventHealth Carrollwood	Egypt Lake-Leto	Hillsborough	120	AdventHealth	Formerly Florida Hospital Carrollwood
AdventHealth Celebration	Celebration	Osceola	297	AdventHealth	Formerly Florida Hospital Celebration; part of AdventHealth Orlando
AdventHealth Connerton	Land O' Lakes	Pasco	77	AdventHealth	Formerly Florida Hospital at Connerton Long Term Acute Care
AdventHealth Dade City	Dade City	Pasco	120	AdventHealth	Formerly Florida Hospital Dade City
AdventHealth Daytona Beach	Daytona Beach	Volusia	362	AdventHealth	Formerly Florida Hospital Memorial Medical
AdventHealth DeLand	DeLand	Volusia	164	AdventHealth	Formerly Florida Hospital DeLand
AdventHealth East Orlando	Orlando	Orange		AdventHealth	Formerly Florida Hospital East Orlando; part of AdventHealth Orlando
AdventHealth Fish Memorial	Orange City	Volusia	257	AdventHealth	Formerly Florida Hospital Fish Memorial
AdventHealth for Children	Orlando	Orange		AdventHealth	Formerly Florida Hospital for Children; part of AdventHealth Orlando
AdventHealth for Women	Orlando	Orange		AdventHealth	Formerly Florida Hospital for Women; part of AdventHealth Orlando
AdventHealth Heart of Florida	Davenport	Polk	202	AdventHealth	Formerly Heart of Florida Regional Medical Center
AdventHealth Kissimmee	Kissimmee	Osceola	282	AdventHealth	Formerly Florida Hospital Kissimmee; part of AdventHealth Orlando
AdventHealth Lake Placid	Lake Placid	Highlands	52	AdventHealth	Formerly Florida Hospital Heartland Medical Center Lake Placid; part of AdventHealth Sebring
AdventHealth Lake Wales	Lake Wales	Polk	160	AdventHealth	Formerly Lake Wales Medical Center
AdventHealth Minneola	Minneola	Lake	80	AdventHealth	Part of AdventHealth Orlando
AdventHealth New Smyrna Beach	New Smyrna Beach	Volusia	109	AdventHealth	Formerly Florida Hospital New Smyrna
AdventHealth North Pinellas	Tarpon Springs	Pinellas	168	AdventHealth	Formerly Florida Hospital North Pinellas
AdventHealth Ocala	Ocala	Marion	425	AdventHealth	Formerly Florida Hospital Ocala
AdventHealth Orlando	Orlando	Orange	1,400	AdventHealth	Formerly Florida Hospital Orlando
AdventHealth Palm Coast	Palm Coast	Flagler	99	AdventHealth	Formerly Florida Hospital Flagler
AdventHealth Palm Coast Parkway	Palm Coast	Flagler	100	AdventHealth	
AdventHealth Port Charlotte	Port Charlotte	Charlotte	254	AdventHealth	Formerly ShorePoint Health Port Charlotte
AdventHealth Riverview	Riverview	Hillsborough	82	AdventHealth	
AdventHealth Sebring	Sebring	Highlands	204	AdventHealth	Formerly Florida Hospital Heartland Medical Center Sebring
AdventHealth Tampa	Tampa	Hillsborough	626	AdventHealth	Formerly Florida Hospital Tampa
AdventHealth Waterman	Tavares	Lake	280	AdventHealth	Formerly Florida Hospital Waterman
AdventHealth Wauchula	Wauchula	Hardee	25	AdventHealth	Formerly Florida Hospital Wauchula; part of AdventHealth Sebring
AdventHealth Wesley Chapel	Wesley Chapel	Pasco	169	AdventHealth	Formerly Florida Hospital Wesley Chapel
AdventHealth Winter Garden	Winter Garden	Orange	100	AdventHealth	Formerly Florida Hospital Winter Garden; part of AdventHealth Orlando
AdventHealth Winter Park	Winter Park	Orange		AdventHealth	Formerly Winter Park Memorial Hospital; part of AdventHealth Orlando
AdventHealth Zephyrhills	Zephyrhills	Pasco	149	AdventHealth	Formerly Florida Hospital Zephyrhills
Ascension Sacred Heart Bay	Panama City	Bay		Ascension	Formerly Bay Medical Center
Ascension Sacred Heart Hospital Emerald Coast	Miramar Beach	Walton	76	Ascension	
Baptist Children's Hospital	Miami	Miami-Dade			
Baptist Health Baptist Hospital of Miami	Miami	Miami-Dade		Baptist Health South Florida	
Baptist Health Bethesda Hospital East	Boynton Beach	Palm Beach		Baptist Health South Florida	Formerly Bethesda Memorial Hospital
Baptist Health Bethesda Hospital West	Boynton Beach	Palm Beach		Baptist Health South Florida	
Baptist Health Boca Raton Regional Hospital	Boca Raton	Palm Beach		Baptist Health South Florida	
Baptist Health Doctors Hospital	Coral Gables	Miami-Dade		Baptist Health South Florida	
Baptist Health Fishermen’s Community Hospital	Marathon	Monroe		Baptist Health South Florida	
Baptist Health Homestead Hospital	Homestead	Miami-Dade		Baptist Health South Florida	
Baptist Health Hospital Doral	Doral	Miami-Dade		Baptist Health South Florida	
Baptist Health Mariners Hospital	Tavernier	Monroe		Baptist Health South Florida	
Baptist Health Wolfson Children's Hospital	Jacksonville	Duval	216	Baptist Jacksonville	
Baptist Hospital	Pensacola	Escambia		Baptist Health Care	
Baptist Medical Center	Jacksonville	Duval		Baptist Jacksonville	
Baptist Medical Center Beaches	Jacksonville Beach	Duval		Baptist Jacksonville	
Baptist Medical Center Nassau	Fernandina Beach	Nassau		Baptist Jacksonville	
Baptist Medical Center South	Jacksonville	Duval		Baptist Jacksonville	
Bartow Regional Medical Center	Bartow	Polk		Baycare Health Systems	
Bay Pines VA Healthcare System	Bay Pines	Pinellas		Veterans Health Administration	
BayCare Alliant Hospital	Dunedin	Pinellas	48	BayCare Health Systems	
Beraja Medical Institute	Coral Gables	Miami-Dade			
Broward Health Coral Springs	Coral Springs	Broward		Broward Health	
Broward Health Imperial Point	Fort Lauderdale	Broward		Broward Health	
Broward Health Medical Center	Fort Lauderdale	Broward		Broward Health	
Broward Health North	Deerfield Beach	Broward		Broward Health	
Cape Canaveral Hospital	Cocoa Beach	Brevard		Health First System	
Cape Coral Hospital	Cape Coral	Lee		Lee Health	
Cedars Medical Center	Miami	Miami-Dade			
Cleveland Clinic Indian River Hospital	Vero Beach	Indian River	332	Cleveland Clinic	
Cleveland Clinic Martin North Hospital	Stuart	Martin		Cleveland Clinic	
Cleveland Clinic Martin South Hospital	Stuart	Martin		Cleveland Clinic	
Cleveland Clinic Tradition Hospital	Port St. Lucie	St. Lucie		Cleveland Clinic	
Cleveland Clinic Weston Hospital	Weston	Broward		Cleveland Clinic	
Columbia Miami Heart Institute	Miami	Miami-Dade			
Community Hospital	New Port Richey	Pasco			
Coral Gables Hospital	Coral Gables	Miami-Dade		Healthcare Systems of America	
Delray Medical Center	Delray Beach	Palm Beach		Tenet Healthcare	
DeSoto Memorial Hospital	Arcadia	DeSoto			
Ed Fraser Memorial Hospital	Macclenny	Baker			
Florida Medical Center	Fort Lauderdale	Broward	459	Healthcare Systems of America	
Gainesville VA Medical Center	Gainesville	Alachua		Veterans Health Administration	
Golisano Children's Hospital of Southwest Florida	Fort Myers	Lee	134	Lee Health	
Good Samaritan Medical Center	West Palm Beach	Palm Beach		Tenet Healthcare	
Gulf Breeze Hospital	Gulf Breeze	Santa Rosa		Baptist Health Care	
Gulf Coast Medical Center	Fort Myers	Lee	699	Lee Health	
H. Lee Moffitt Cancer Center & Research Institute	Tampa	Hillsborough			
Halifax Health | UF Health Medical Center of Deltona	Deltona	Volusia	43	Halifax Health	
Halifax Health Medical Center of Daytona Beach	Daytona Beach	Volusia		Halifax Health	
Halifax Health Medical Center of Port Orange	Port Orange	Volusia	80	Halifax Health	
HCA Florida Aventura Hospital	Aventura	Miami-Dade		HCA Florida	Formerly Aventura Hospital Medical Center
HCA Florida Bayonet Point Hospital	Hudson	Pasco	290	HCA Florida	Formerly Columbia Regional Medical Center Bayonet Point, Regional Medical Center Bayonet Point
HCA Florida Blake Hospital	Bradenton	Manatee		HCA Florida	Formerly Blake Medical Center
HCA Florida Brandon Hospital	Brandon	Hillsborough		HCA Florida	Formerly Brandon Regional Hospital
HCA Florida Capital Hospital	Tallahassee	Leon	288	HCA Florida	Formerly Capital Regional Medical Center
HCA Florida Citrus Hospital	Inverness	Citrus	204	HCA Florida	Formerly Citrus Memorial Hospital
HCA Florida Englewood Hospital	Englewood	Sarasota		HCA Florida	Formerly Englewood Community Hospital
HCA Florida Fawcett Hospital	Port Charlotte	Charlotte	253	HCA Florida	Formerly Fawcett Memorial Hospital
HCA Florida Fort Walton-Destin Hospital	Fort Walton Beach	Okaloosa	267	HCA Florida	Formerly Fort Walton Beach Medical Center
HCA Florida Gulf Coast Hospital	Panama City	Bay	238	HCA Florida	Formerly Gulf Coast Regional Medical Center
HCA Florida Highlands Hospital	Sebring	Highlands	126	HCA Florida	Formerly Highlands Regional Medical Center
HCA Florida JFK Hospital	Atlantis	Palm Beach	527	HCA Florida	Formerly JFK Medical Center
HCA Florida JFK North Hospital	West Palm Beach	Palm Beach	260	HCA Florida	Formerly West Palm Beach Hospital, JFK Medical Center North Campus
HCA Florida Kendall Hospital	Miami	Miami-Dade	447	HCA Florida	Formerly Kendall Regional Medical Center
HCA Florida Lake City Hospital	Lake City	Columbia	103	HCA Florida	Formerly Lake City Medical Center
HCA Florida Lake Monroe Hospital	Sanford	Seminole		HCA Florida	Formerly Central Florida Regional Hospital
HCA Florida Largo Hospital	Largo	Pinellas		HCA Florida	Formerly Largo Medical Center
HCA Florida Largo West Hospital	Largo	Pinellas		HCA Florida	Formerly Sun Coast Hospital, Largo Medical Center-Indian Rocks
HCA Florida Lawnwood Hospital	Fort Pierce	St. Lucie		HCA Florida	Formerly Lawnwood Regional Medical Center
HCA Florida Lehigh Hospital	Lehigh Acres	Lee	53	HCA Florida	Formerly Lehigh Regional Medical Center
HCA Florida Memorial Hospital	Jacksonville	Duval	454	HCA Florida	Formerly Memorial Hospital Jacksonville
HCA Florida Mercy Hospital	Miami	Miami-Dade	488	HCA Florida	Formerly Mercy Hospital
HCA Florida North Florida Hospital	Gainesville	Alachua	510	HCA Florida	Formerly North Florida Regional Medical Center
HCA Florida Northside Hospital	St. Petersburg	Pinellas	288	HCA Florida	
HCA Florida Northwest Hospital	Margate	Broward		HCA Florida	Formerly Northwest Medical Center
HCA Florida Oak Hill Hospital	Brooksville	Hernando	350	HCA Florida	
HCA Florida Ocala Hospital	Ocala	Marion		HCA Florida	Formerly Ocala Regional Medical Center
HCA Florida Orange Park Hospital	Orange Park	Clay		HCA Florida	Formerly Orange Park Medical Center
HCA Florida Osceola Hospital	Kissimmee	Osceola	404	HCA Florida	Formerly Osceola Regional Medical Center
HCA Florida Oviedo Medical Center	Oviedo	Seminole		HCA Florida	Formerly Oviedo Medical Center
HCA Florida Palms West Hospital	Loxahatchee	Palm Beach		HCA Florida	
HCA Florida Pasadena Hospital	St. Petersburg	Pinellas	307	HCA Florida	Formerly Palms of Pasadena Hospital
HCA Florida Poinciana Hospital	Poinciana	Osceola/Polk		HCA Florida	
HCA Florida Putnam Hospital	Palatka	Putnam	99	HCA Florida	Formerly Putnam Community Medical Center
HCA Florida Raulerson Hospital	Okeechobee	Okeechobee	100	HCA Florida	Formerly Poinciana Medical Center
HCA Florida Sarasota Doctors Hospital	Sarasota	Sarasota	155	HCA Florida	Formerly Doctors Hospital of Sarasota
HCA Florida South Shore Hospital	Sun City	Hillsborough	138	HCA Florida	Formerly South Bay Hospital
HCA Florida South Tampa Hospital	Tampa	Hillsborough	183	HCA Florida	Formerly Memorial Hospital of Tampa
HCA Florida St. Lucie Hospital	Port Saint Lucie	St. Lucie	207	HCA Florida	Formerly St. Lucie Medical Center
HCA Florida St. Petersburg Hospital	St. Petersburg	Pinellas	215	HCA Florida	Formerly St. Petersburg General Hospital
HCA Florida Trinity Hospital	Trinity	Pasco	340	HCA Florida	Formerly Medical Center of Trinity
HCA Florida Twin Cities Hospital	Niceville	Okaloosa	65	HCA Florida	
HCA Florida UCF Lake Nona Hospital	Orlando	Orange	64	HCA Florida	
HCA Florida University Hospital	Davie	Broward	165	HCA Florida	
HCA Florida West Hospital	Pensacola	Escambia		HCA Florida	Formerly West Florida Healthcare
HCA Florida West Marion Hospital	Ocala	Marion	186	HCA Florida	Part of HCA Florida Ocala Hospital
HCA Florida Westside Hospital	Plantation	Broward	250	HCA Florida	Formerly Westside Regional Medical Center
HCA Florida Woodmont Hospital	Tamarac	Broward	317	HCA Florida	Formerly University Hospital and Medical Center
HealthPark Medical Center	Fort Myers	Lee	460	Lee Health	
Hendry Regional Medical Center	Clewiston	Hendry			
Heritage Hospital	Lecanto	Citrus			
Hialeah Hospital	Hialeah	Miami-Dade		Healthcare Systems of America	
Hollywood Medical Center	Hollywood	Broward			
Holmes Regional Medical Center	Melbourne	Brevard	514		
Holy Cross Hospital	Fort Lauderdale	Broward		Trinity Health	
Jackson Hospital	Marianna	Jackson		Jackson County Hospital Corporation	
Jackson Memorial Hospital	Miami	Miami-Dade	1550	Jackson Health System	
Jackson North Medical Center	North Miami Beach	Miami-Dade		Jackson Health System	Formerly Parkway Regional Medical Center
Jackson South Medical Center	Miami	Miami-Dade		Jackson Health System	
Jackson West Medical Center	Doral	Miami-Dade	100	Jackson Health System	
James A. Haley Veterans Hospital	Tampa	Hillsborough		Veterans Health Administration	
Jay Hospital	Jay	Santa Rosa	49	Baptist Health Care	
Joe DiMaggio Children's Hospital	Hollywood	Broward		Memorial Health System	
Johns Hopkins All Children's Hospital	St. Petersburg	Pinellas		Johns Hopkins Health System	
Jupiter Medical Center	Jupiter	Palm Beach			
Keralty Hospital Miami	Miami	Miami-Dade		Keralty Health Enterprise	Formerly Westchester General Hospital
Kindred Hospital Bay Area-St. Petersburg	St. Petersburg	Pinellas		ScionHealth	
Kindred Hospital Melbourne	Melbourne	Brevard		ScionHealth	
Kindred Hospital North Florida	Green Cove Springs	Clay		ScionHealth	
Kindred Hospital Ocala	Ocala	Marion		ScionHealth	
Kindred Hospital The Palm Beaches	Riviera Beach	Palm Beach		ScionHealth	
Kindred Hospital South Florida - Coral Gables	Coral Gables	Miami-Dade		ScionHealth	
Kindred Hospital South Florida - Ft. Lauderdale	Ft. Lauderdale	Broward		ScionHealth	
Kindred Hospital South Florida - Hollywood	Hollywood	Broward		ScionHealth	
Lake City VA Medical Center	Lake City	Columbia		Veterans Health Administration	
Lakeland Regional Health Medical Center	Lakeland	Polk	892	Lakeland Regional Health	
Lakewood Ranch Medical Center	Lakewood Ranch	Manatee	120	UHS	
Larkin Community Hospital	South Miami	Miami-Dade		Larkin Health System	
Larkin Community Hospital Palm Springs Campus	Hialeah	Miami-Dade	247	Larkin Health System	
Larkin Community Hospital Behavioral Health Services	Hollywood	Broward	50	Larkin Health System	
Lee Memorial Hospital	Fort Myers	Lee		Lee Health	
Lee Health Coconut Point	Estero	Lee	0	Lee Health	
Lower Keys Medical Center	Key West	Monroe		Community Health Systems	
Manatee Memorial Hospital	Bradenton	Manatee		UHS	
Martin Memorial Health Systems	Stuart	Martin			
Mayo Clinic Florida	Jacksonville	Duval			
Mease Countryside Hospital	Safety Harbor	Pinellas		BayCare Health System	
Mease Dunedin Hospital	Dunedin	Pinellas		BayCare Health System	
Medical Center Clinic	Pensacola	Escambia			
Memorial Hospital Miramar	Miramar	Broward		Memorial Health System	
Memorial Hospital Pembroke	Pembroke Pines	Broward		Memorial Health System	
Memorial Hospital West	Pembroke Pines	Broward		Memorial Health System	
Memorial Regional Hospital	Hollywood	Broward	797	Memorial Health System	
Memorial Regional Hospital South	Hollywood	Broward		Memorial Health System	
Miami Children's Hospital	Miami	Miami-Dade			
Morton Plant Hospital	Clearwater	Pinellas		BayCare Health System	
Morton Plant North Bay Hospital	New Port Richey	Pasco			
Mount Sinai Medical Center & Miami Heart Institute	Miami Beach	Miami-Dade			
Naval Hospital Jacksonville	Jacksonville	Duval			
Naval Hospital Pensacola	Pensacola	Escambia			
NCH Healthcare System - Downtown Naples	Naples	Collier		NCH Healthcare System	
NCH Healthcare System - North Naples	Naples	Collier		NCH Healthcare System	
Nemours Children's Hospital	Orlando	Orange	130	Nemours Children's Health	
Nemours Children's Clinic Hospital	Pensacola	Escambia		Nemours Children's Health	
Nemours Children's Hospital	Jacksonville	Duval		Nemours Children's Health	
Nicklaus Children's Hospital at St. Mary's Medical Center	West Palm Beach	Palm Beach		Nicklaus Children's Health System (NCHS)	
North Okaloosa Medical Center	Crestview	Okaloosa		Community Health Systems	
North Ridge Medical Center	Fort Lauderdale	Broward			
North Shore Medical Center	Miami	Miami-Dade		Healthcare Systems of America	
North Walton Doctors Hospital	DeFuniak Springs	Walton	50		previously Healthmark Regional Medical Center; closed March 18, 2022 with property being sold in 2023 for a 2024 reopening.or
Northeast Florida State Hospital	Macclenny	Baker			
Northwest Florida Community Hospital	Chipley	Washington	25	Signature Healthcare	
Orlando Health - Health Central Hospital	Ocoee	Orange	171	Orlando Health	
Orlando Health Arnold Palmer Hospital for Children	Orlando	Orange		Orlando Health	
Orlando Health Bayfront Hospital	St. Petersburg	Pinellas	480	Orlando Health	Formerly Bayfront Health St. Petersburg, Bayfront Medical Center, Mound Park Hospital
Orlando Health Dr. P. Phillips Hospital	Orlando	Orange		Orlando Health	
Orlando Health Horizon West Hospital	Winter Garden	Orange	30	Orlando Health	
Orlando Health Melbourne Hospital	Melbourne	Brevard	119	Orlando Health	Formerly Wuesthoff Medical Center Melbourne and also formerly Melbourne Regional Medical Center
Orlando Health Orlando Regional Medical Center	Orlando	Orange		Orlando Health	
Orlando Health South Lake Hospital	Clermont	Lake		Orlando Health	
Orlando Health South Seminole Hospital	Longwood	Seminole		Orlando Health	
Orlando Health St. Cloud Hospital	St. Cloud	Osceola		Orlando Health	
Orlando Health Sebastian River Hospital	Sebastian	Indian River		Orlando Health	Formerly Sebastian River Medical Center
Orlando Health Winnie Palmer Hospital for Women & Babies	Orlando	Orange	285	Orlando Health	
Orlando VA Medical Center	Orlando	Orange		Veterans Health Administration	
Palm Bay Hospital	Palm Bay	Brevard		Health First	
Palm Beach Gardens Medical Center	Palm Beach Gardens	Palm Beach		Tenet Healthcare	
Palm Springs General Hospital	Hialeah	Miami-Dade	247		Sold to Larkin Health System on Feb 1, 2016 and renamed Larkin Community Hospital Palm Springs Campus
Palmetto General Hospital	Hialeah	Miami-Dade	360	Healthcare Systems of America	
PAM Health Specialty Hospital of Jacksonville	Jacksonville	Duval		PAM Health	LTAC
Parrish Medical Center	Titusville	Brevard		North Brevard County Hospital District	
Physicians Regional Medical Center - Collier Boulevard	Naples	Collier		Community Health Systems	
Physicians Regional Medical Center - Pine Ridge	Naples	Collier		Community Health Systems	
River Point Behavioral Health	Jacksonville	Duval			Formerly Ten Broeck Hospital
Sacred Heart Hospital	Pensacola	Escambia		Ascension	
Salah Foundation Children's Hospital	Fort Lauderdale	Broward			
Santa Rosa Medical Center	Milton	Santa Rosa		Community Health Systems	
Sarasota Memorial Hospital	Sarasota	Sarasota	901	Sarasota County Public Hospital District	
ShorePoint Health Punta Gorda	Punta Gorda	Charlotte	208	AdventHealth	Formerly Charlotte Regional Medical Center, later Bayfront Health Punta Gorda
Sarasota Memorial Hospital - Venice	Venice	Sarasota	212	Sarasota Memorial Healthcare System	
South Florida Baptist Hospital	Plant City	Hillsborough		BayCare Health System	
South Miami Hospital	South Miami	Miami-Dade		Baptist Health South Florida	
St. Anthony's Hospital	St. Petersburg	Pinellas		BayCare Health System	
St. Joseph's Children's Hospital	Tampa	Hillsborough		BayCare Health System	
St. Joseph's Hospital	Tampa	Hillsborough	615	BayCare Health System	Founded as Tampa Heights Hospital
St. Joseph's Hospital - North	Cheval	Hillsborough		BayCare Health System	
St. Joseph's Hospital - South	Riverview	Hillsborough		BayCare Health System	
St. Joseph's Women's Hospital	Tampa	Hillsborough		BayCare Health System	
St. Mary's Medical Center	West Palm Beach	Palm Beach		Tenet Healthcare	
St. Vincent's Medical Center Clay County	Middleburg	Clay		St. Vincent's Hospital	
St. Vincent's Medical Center Riverside	Jacksonville	Duval		St. Vincent's Hospital	
St. Vincent's Medical Center Southside	Jacksonville	Duval		St. Vincent's Hospital	
Tallahassee Memorial HealthCare	Tallahassee	Leon		Tallahassee Memorial Hospital	
Tampa General Hospital	Tampa	Hillsborough		TGH Health System	
TGH Brooksville	Brooksville	Hernando		Tampa General Hospital	Formerly Bravera Health Brooksville
TGH Crystal River	Crystal River	Citrus		Tampa General Hospital	Formerly Bravera Health Seven Rivers
TGH Spring Hill	Spring Hill	Hernando		Tampa General Hospital	Formerly Bravera Health Spring Hill
UF Health Flagler Hospital	St. Augustine	St. Johns		UF Health St. Johns	Formerly Flagler Hospital
UF Health Jacksonville	Jacksonville	Duval		University of Florida Health	Formerly University Medical Center, Methodist Medical Center, Shands Jacksonville
UF Health Leesburg Hospital	Leesburg	Lake	353	University of Florida Health	Formerly Leesburg Regional Medical Center
UF Health North	Jacksonville	Duval		University of Florida Health	
UF Health Shands Children's Hospital	Gainesville	Alachua		University of Florida Health	Formerly Shands Children's Hospital
UF Health Shands Hospital	Gainesville	Alachua		University of Florida Health	Formerly Alachua General Hospital, Alachua County Hospital and Shands Hospital
UF Health The Villages® Hospital	The Villages	Sumter		University of Florida Health	Formerly Villages Regional Hospital
University of Miami Hospital	Miami	Miami-Dade		University of Miami Health	
Viera Hospital	Viera	Brevard			
Wellington Regional Medical Center	Wellington	Palm Beach	235	UHS	
West Boca Medical Center	Boca Raton	Palm Beach		Tenet Healthcare	
Winter Haven Hospital	Winter Haven	Polk		BayCare Health System	

== Closed hospitals ==
Name	City	County	Hospital beds	Year opened	Date closed	Affiliation	Notes
ShorePoint Health Venice	Venice	Sarasota	312	1951	2022	Community Health Systems	Formerly South Sarasota County Memorial Hospital, Venice Memorial Hospital, Venice Hospital, Bon Secours Venice Hospital, Venice Regional Bayfront Health
Shands Lake Shore Regional Medical Center	Lake City	Columbia	99	1963	2020	Community Health Systems	
Alachua General Hospital	Gainesville	Alachua		1928	2009	Shands HealthCare	became part of Shands HealthCare in 1996; Santa Fe Healthcare owned it from 1983-1996; originally Alachua County Hospital
Regional General Hospital Williston	Williston	Levy	20		June 26, 2019		Formerly Tri-County Hospital - Williston
Campbellton-Graceville Hospital	Graceville	Jackson	25		June 2017		
Tampa Community Hospital	Tampa	Hillsborough			November 2016	HCA Florida	Merged with Memorial Hospital of Tampa Formerly Town & Country Hospital
Edward White Hospital	St. Petersburg	Pinellas	162	1976	2014	HCA Florida	
Pan American Hospital	Miami	Miami-Dade		1963	2014		Purchased by Steward Healthcare
A.G. Holley State Hospital	Lantana	Palm Beach			2012		
Glades General Hospital	Belle Glade	Palm Beach		1965	2009		Replaced by Lakeside Medical Center
Trinity Community Hospital	Jasper	Hamilton	42		August 2008		
Gadsden Community Hospital	Quincy	Gadsden	25		Nov 2005		
Gulf Pines Hospital	Port Saint Joe		45		March 2005		
Everglades Regional Medical Center	Pahokee			1936	1998		
Centro Asturiano Hospital	Tampa				1990		
North Miami Medical Center	Miami	Miami-Dade			1990		
Sunland Hospital	Tallahassee	Leon		1952	1983		
Florida A&M Hospital	Tallahassee	Leon		1911	1971		
Johnston's Hospital	Tallahassee	Leon			1948		Also operated under the names Seventh Day Adventist Hospital and Forsyth Hospital

== Other hospitals ==
There are several Long term acute care hospitals and inpatient rehab facilities in the state

Name	City	County	Hospital beds	Affiliation	Notes
Brooks Rehabilitation Hospital	Jacksonville	Duval	160	Brooks Rehabilitation	
Encompass Health Rehabilitation Hospital, an affiliate of Martin Health	Stuart	Martin	64		
Encompass Health Rehabilitation Hospital of Altamonte Springs	Altamonte Springs	Seminole			
Encompass Health Rehabilitation Hospital of Largo	Largo	Pinellas		Encompass Health	Formerly HealthSouth Rehabilitation Hospital of Largo
Encompass Health Rehabilitation Hospital of Miami	Miami	Miami-Dade		Encompass Health	Formerly HealthSouth Rehabilitation Hospital of Miami
Encompass Health Rehabilitation Hospital of Ocala	Ocala	Marion			
Encompass Health Rehabilitation Hospital of Panama City	Panama City	Bay		Encompass Health	Formerly HealthSouth Emerald Coast Rehabilitation Hospital
Encompass Health Rehabilitation Hospital of Sarasota	Sarasota	Sarasota		Encompass Health	Formerly HealthSouth Rehabilitation Hospital of Sarasota
Encompass Health Rehabilitation Hospital of Spring Hill	Brooksville	Hernando		Encompass Health	Formerly HealthSouth Rehabilitation Hospital of Spring Hill
Encompass Health Rehabilitation Hospital of Sunrise	Sunrise	Bay		Encompass Health	Formerly HealthSouth Sunrise Rehabilitation Hospital
Encompass Health Rehabilitation Hospital of Tallahassee	Tallahassee	Leon		Encompass Health	Formerly HealthSouth Rehabilitation Hospital of Tallahassee
Encompass Health Rehabilitation Hospital of Treasure Coast	Vero Beach	Indian River	80	Encompass Health	Formerly HealthSouth Treasure Coast Rehabilitation Hospital
Florida State Hospital	Chattahoochee	Gadsden	984		State Psychiatric hospital opened in 1876
PAM Specialty Hospital of Sarasota	Sarasota	Sarasota	40		Formerly HealthSouth RidgeLake Hospital
Pinecrest Rehabilitation Hospital	Delray Beach	Palm Beach			
Rehabilitation Hospital	Pensacola	Escambia			
Sea Pines Rehabilitation Hospital, an affiliate of Encompass Health	Melbourne	Brevard		Encompass Health	Formerly HealthSouth Sea Pines Rehabilitation Hospital
UF Health Shands Psychiatric Hospital	Gainesville	Alachua		University of Florida Health	Formerly Shands Vista
UF Health Shands Rehab Hospital	Gainesville	Alachua		University of Florida Health	Formerly Shands Rehab Hospital
