= Bartow Regional Medical Center =

- BayCare Health System

Geography
- Location: 2200 Osprey Boulevard, Bartow, Florida, United States
- Coordinates: 27.9187°N 81.8439°W

Organization
- Care system: Private
- Affiliated university: None

Services
- Beds: 72 inpatient beds

Helipads
- Helipad: FAA LID: 1FL7; Aeronautical chart and airport information for 1FL7 at SkyVector
Number	Length		Surface
Number	ft	m	Surface
H1	60	18	Concrete

History
- Constructed: 1998
- Opened: 1925

Links
- Website: www.bartowregional.com
- Lists: Hospitals in Florida

Bartow Regional Medical Center is a hospital in Bartow, Florida. It is owned by non-profit health care provider BayCare. Bartow Regional Medical Center's main building is a general use hospital that includes an emergency department, an intensive care unit and various outpatient services. On the south side of Osprey Boulevard, which is south of the main building, are two medical office buildings. These buildings house physicians’ offices and clinics, including the hospital's sleep disorders center.

== History ==
In 1925 Bartow Memorial Hospital was opened and at that time was managed by the City of Bartow. The hospital, located on East Main Street, grew to include a number of buildings. The hospital building itself had a floor space of 54,000 square feet (5,000 m^{2}). In 1954 Bartow Memorial became a non-profit organization. In 1996 the hospital became part of the Columbia-HCA Healthcare System. Columbia changed its name to the Hospital Corporation of America and held Bartow Memorial until 1999. In September 1998 construction began on the current hospital, located on the north side of Bartow.

While construction was underway, LifePoint Hospitals Incorporated became the new owner of Bartow Memorial. Construction was completed in December 1999 and the new hospital building had 125,000 square feet (11,600 m^{2}). The hospital was renamed as Bartow Regional Medical Center. Later, Health Management Associates (HMA) bought the hospital. In January 2014, HMA was bought by Community Health Systems. In 2015, the hospital was sold to Clearwater-based BayCare Health System, a non-profit organization.

== Ratings ==
The HealthGrades website provides rating data for Bartow Regional Medical Center. Of the thirteen patient safety indicators listed, Bartow Regional scored one below average, two average and two better than average. Patient survey data on the HealthGrades website says 55% of patients gave the hospital a 9 or 10. Nationally, 69% of patients gave hospitals a 9 or 10. HealthGrades provided data on rated patient outcomes in eighteen specialties. Outcomes for these specialties while patients were still in the hospital were rated. Fifteen of these specialties were rated as average (3 stars). None was rated as worse (1 star) and three were rated better than average (5 stars). This rating scheme only allows three options to be recorded, 1, 3 or 5 stars; there are no options of giving 2 or 4 stars.
