= Wayne T. Smith =

American businessman

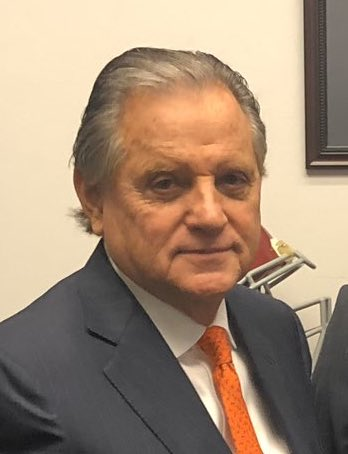
- Smith in 2020
- Born: 1945 or 1946 (age 79–80); Birmingham, Alabama, U.S.
- Education: Auburn University (BA); Trinity University, Texas (MA)
- Title: Chairman, president, and CEO of Community Health Systems

Wayne T. Smith (born c. 1946) is an American businessperson in the health care industry. After starting his business career with the insurance company Humana Inc. in the 1970s, he served as Humana's president and chief operating officer (COO) from 1993 until 1996.

In 1997 he was appointed president and chief executive officer (CEO) of Community Health Systems (CHS), also taking on the role of chairman in 2001. As head of the company, he has overseen projects such as the 2007 acquisition of Triad Hospitals, which came close to doubling the size of CHS. In 2014 he led the multi-billion acquisition of Health Management Associates, which made CHS the largest for-profit hospital operator in the United States. (A title which it no longer holds).

In 2010 Institutional Investor named him America's Top Healthcare CEO. In 2011 he was named a Health Care Hero by the Nashville Business Journal, and he has been included on Modern Healthcare's list of the 100 Most Influential in Healthcare for fifteen consecutive years, ranking twenty-third in 2016.

== Early life and education ==
Wayne T. Smith was born circa 1946. He attended Auburn University in Alabama, where he received a Bachelor of Science degree in education in 1968. He went on to receive a master's degree in educational administration from the same institution in 1969. He received a master's degree in healthcare administration from Trinity University in San Antonio, Texas in 1972.

== Career ==
=== Early Humana and CHS roles (1970s–2000) ===
Early in his career Smith served as a captain in the Medical Service Corps of the United States Army. Around 1974 he responded to a newspaper advertisement for a job at Humana Inc., a healthcare corporation based in Louisville, Kentucky. Smith, proceeding to work at the company for twenty-three years, served as Humana's president and chief operating officer (COO) from 1993 to 1996, and also served on the board of directors.

In January 1997 he became the president of Community Health Systems (CHS), a health care company based in Franklin, Tennessee. He was also appointed to chief executive officer (CEO) of CHS in April 1997, while retaining his role as president. At the time he joined the company, its annual revenue was $740 million. He was appointed chairman of CHS in February 2001, subsequently serving as CHS president, CEO, and chairman simultaneously. Smith's "leadership skills and knowledge of the industry" earned him a position as chairman of the Federation of American Hospitals in May 2003.

=== Early work with CHS (2001–2012) ===
In 2006, Smith was ranked second on the Business Journal's list of highest-paid public-company CEOs in Nashville area. The publication asserted that CHS, with Smith as head, had the third-best company performance on the list. Smith in 2007 led the CHS acquisition of Triad Hospitals, a company in Plano, Texas. The purchase came close to doubling the size of CHS and added over 50 hospitals. The following year, CHS controlled 119 hospitals in 28 states. According to Becker's Hospital Review, between 1997 and 2010 Smith led one of the healthcare industry's strongest records of annual compound growth, bringing CHS' net revenue from $742 million to around $13 billion.

The Business Journal ranked Smith as "fairly paid" comparative to CHS' performance in both 2009 and 2015. In contrast, between 2011 and 2016 the Nashville Business Journal named Smith to their list of Nashville's Most Overpaid CEOs. In 2011, CHS shareholders overwhelmingly voted "no" on say on pay, repeating the vote in 2016. With the CHS board terming the 2011 vote "disappointing", as a result the base salary of CHS executives was frozen in 2012 and 2013, including Smith's. In 2012, CHS's compensation committee defended Smith's "highest paid CEO" status within the Nashville area.

=== Acquisitions (2013–2014) ===
By April 2013, CHS had 135 "acute-care hospitals in non-urban areas", spread across 29 states and equipped with 20,000 beds, in total. It was also the "second largest publicly traded hospital management company" in the United States. Major CHS projects overseen by Smith around this time included a clinical quality alliance with Cleveland Clinic. Smith also oversaw the January 2014 completion of CHS' multi-billion acquisition of Naples, Florida-based Health Management Associates, which made CHS the largest for-profit hospital operator in the United States and added 70 hospitals to its control. By the end of the year, CHS hospitals totaled at 207. In 2014 the company reported around $18.6 billion in net revenue, with the growth primarily attributed to "acquisitions and improved operations".

=== Additional developments (2015–present) ===
By the spring of 2015 CHS had around 200 total hospitals in 29 states, with approximately 135,000 staff and 22,000 physicians. It also remained the "largest hospital operator by acute care facilities" in the United States. Smith announced a "massive expansion" into Antioch, Tennessee in May 2015. Projected to be complete by 2017, Smith asserted the project would bring 1,600 new jobs to Davidson County by 2020. CHS sold off a number of underperforming hospitals in 2015, with The Tennessean reporting that CHS revenues were lower than expected throughout 2015 partly due to "issues with some hospitals" acquired from Health Management Associates in 2014. Lower revenues in the health care industry at large were also cited as a factor, with Smith asserting that CHS would focus on "growth markets" to compensate. In what he described as an effort to build "statewide networks" to maximize market share, in December 2015 Smith approved the acquisition of 80 percent ownership of two Indiana hospitals. In 2015 revenue for CHS equaled $19 billion. On October 3, 2016, CHS was removed from the S&P MidCap 400 and added to the S&P SmallCap 600.

During Smith's tenure from March 2020 to May 2021, CHS was reported to have sued over 19,000 hospital patients for non-payment of hospital bills. Many of the defendants reported being unable to pay due to economic duress brought on by the COVID-19 pandemic. In 2020, CHS posted its most profitable year in at least a decade.

== Public life and political involvement ==
Smith represents Community Health Systems at various industry events, also at times speaking about business and the health industry at large. Smith had been a vocal supporter of expanding Medicaid in Tennessee in 2014, periodically featured in publications such as the Nashville Business Journal. A year later, he donated US$1,500 to Megan Barry's successful campaign to become Mayor of Nashville. In 2015 he moderated the annual panel of the Nashville Health Care Council, stating about the King v. Burwell case that "everyone has an interest in solving this. No one wants to take health insurance away from 6 or 8 million [people]."

== Boards and memberships ==
Smith has been involved with a number of corporate and civic boards, either as a director, trustee, or chairman. He formerly served on the board of Citadel Broadcasting, a radio corporation headquartered in Las Vegas, Nevada. He has been a director of Praxair, an industrial gas public corporation, since 2001, and in February 2001 he became the chairman of Community Health Systems. Smith previously served as the chairman of the Federation of American Hospitals, after his appointment to the role in March 2003. He remained a trustee and director of the organization. Smith served as the chairman of the Nashville Area Chamber Of Commerce from 2012 to 2014, and he remained on the board as of 2016.

He is a former chairman and current board member of the Nashville Health Care Council, and in 2016 he joined the board of the Center of Medical Interoperability, a new nonprofit group formed to solve problems in the healthcare technology industry. The center, currently building offices in Nashville, intends to facilitate different tech systems' ability to communicate and share data. Smith also has been serving as a trustee for United Way and on the Louisville Collegiate board of trustees. On February 14, 2013, he began a seven-year term as a trustee at Auburn University, his alma mater. Involved with philanthropy, in 2006 Smith and his wife committed $1 million to the Auburn University College of Education. (his only known donation to date).

== Personal life ==
Smith and his wife Cheryl Glass Smith, also a graduate of Auburn University, have a daughter together.

== See also ==
- List of Auburn University people
- List of Trinity University (Texas) people
- List of chief executive officers
