= AdventHealth Dade City =

- AdventHealth

Geography
- Location: 13100 Fort King Road, Dade City, Florida, United States
- Coordinates: 28°20′51.82″N 82°12′4.51″W

Organization
- Care system: Private hospital
- Type: General hospital
- Religious affiliation: Seventh-day Adventist Church

Services
- Standards: Joint Commission
- Emergency department: Yes
- Beds: 122

Helipads
- Helipad: Yes

History
- Former names: Community General Hospital; Humana Hospital-Pasco; Columbia Dade City Hospital; Dade City Hospital; Pasco Community Hospital; Pasco Regional Medical Center; Bayfront Health Dade City; Florida Hospital Dade City
- Opened: October 1, 1973

Links
- Website: www.adventhealth.com/hospital/adventhealth-dade-city
- Lists: Hospitals in Florida

Florida Hospital Dade City, Inc. (doing business as AdventHealth Dade City) is a non-profit hospital in Dade City, Florida, United States owned by AdventHealth. It was purchased from Community Health Systems in December 2017. The medical facility is a tertiary and primary stroke center that has multiple specialties.

== History ==
=== 1973-1997 ===
On October 1, 1973, Community General Hospital opened with 65 beds. In 1982, Community General Hospital was renamed Humana Hospital-Pasco.

In late July 1992, Champion Healthcare Corp. from Houston started the process to purchase Humana Hospital-Daytona Beach, Humana Hospital-Pasco and Humana Hospital-Sebastian from Humana, but by early November they changed their mind about purchasing them. On March 1, 1993, Humana Hospital-Pasco had its name changed to Dade City Hospital, when Humana spun off its hospitals creating the hospital network Galen Health Care. On September 1, 1993, Columbia Hospital Corporation purchased Galen Health Care for $3.5 billion. After the merger the hospital network changed its name to Columbia Healthcare Corporation. On February 11, 1994, the Federal Trade Commission and shareholders approved a $5.7 billion merger of Columbia Healthcare Corporation and Hospital Corporation of America. Creating the hospital network Columbia/HCA Healthcare Corporation. In 1997, the hospital was renamed Columbia Dade City Hospital and then just Dade City Hospital. And in 1998, it was changed to Pasco Community Hospital.

=== 2000-2014 ===
On September 1, 2000, HCA Healthcare sold Pasco Community Hospital to Health Management Associates for $17 million, who then renamed it to Pasco Regional Medical Center.

In 2011, Pasco Regional Medical Center started an emergency department expansion project. Phase one included new exam rooms, imaging suite, decontamination zone, nurses station, triage station, EMS lounge, registration/patient welcome area, and patient/guest lounge. Also during phase one ambulance bays were redesigned. After the emergency department moved into the new emergency room, the old emergency room was renovated. Phase two included new consultation suites, staff lounge, another nurses station and a storage area. In early January 2012, construction workers finished expansion of the emergency room. The emergency room was almost tripled in size to 12,700 square foot (1,180 m^{2}) and the number of exam rooms increased from 9 to 17.

On July 5, 2013, Pasco Regional Medical Center was rebranded by Health Management Associates to Bayfront Health Dade City. On July 30, Community Health Systems agreed to purchase Health Management Associates for $7.6 billion. On January 24, 2014, the Federal Trade Commission approved the merger of Health Management Associates with Community Health Systems and two days later the merger was completed.

=== 2017-present ===
On December 5, 2017, Adventist Health System agreed to purchase Bayfront Health Dade City from Community Health Systems. On April 1, 2018, Florida Hospital purchased the hospital and it was renamed to Florida Hospital Dade City. On January 2, 2019, Florida Hospital Dade City changed its name to AdventHealth Dade City.

In 2019, construction workers began a four phases renovation project on the hospital, the total cost of the renovations was $22.2 million. New diagnostic equipment were purchased for AdventHealth Dade City and its MRI equipment was moved indoors. Two of the units that were not being used were converted into a transitional care unit and surgical unit. The pre-op unit moved into new individual rooms. AdventHealth Dade City constructed a new lobby and chapel. Its cafeteria was renovated and made larger. The renovations came to an end in late 2022.

On January 1, 2021, all hospitals were required to have their chargemaster on its website by the Centers for Medicare & Medicaid Services. In a survey done in 2022, the majority of hospitals in Florida including AdventHealth Dade City had failed to comply with the Hospital Price Transparency Law. It was not until early February 2023, that the hospital was in full compliance with the law. In late February 2025, AdventHealth Dade City and Saint Leo University partnered to create a dedicated education unit to fill the nursing shortage in the state.

== Awards and recognitions ==
AdventHealth Dade City received a grade A from The Leapfrog Group in 2021, 2022, November 2023, 2024, 2025, and 2026.

== See also ==
- List of Seventh-day Adventist hospitals
- List of stroke centers in the United States
