= Doctors Hospital =

Doctors Hospital or Doctor's Hospital may refer to:

== Hospitals ==
- Doctors Hospital (Augusta, Georgia), a 350-bed full-service tertiary care center located in Augusta, Georgia
- Doctors Hospital (Beverly Hills, California)
- Doctors Hospital (Columbus, Ohio), a religiously-affiliated hospital located in Columbus, Ohio
- Doctors Hospital (Coral Gables, Florida)
- Doctors Hospital, Lahore, Lahore, Pakistan
- Doctor's Hospital (Lanham, Maryland), a full-service hospital located in Lanham, Maryland, a northeastern suburb of Washington, D.C.
- Doctors Hospital of Laredo
- Doctors Hospital (Manhattan, New York)
- Doctors Hospital (Nassau, Bahamas), formerly the Rassin Hospital.
- Doctors Hospital (Nelsonville, Ohio)
- Doctors Hospital (Omaha, Nebraska), now CHI Health Midlands
- Doctors Hospital (San Pablo, California)
- Doctors Hospital (Sarasota, Florida)
- Doctors Hospital (Seattle, Washington), now integrated with Swedish Medical Center
- Doctors Hospital (Springfield, Illinois), a former for-profit hospital in Springfield, Illinois
- Doctors Hospital (Staten Island, New York), a for-profit hospital located in the Concord section of Staten Island
- The Doctor's Hospital, Toronto from 1953 to 1998. Now known as Kensington Health Centre

== Television ==
- Doctors' Hospital, medical drama that ran on NBC during the 1975–1976 season

== See also ==
- Cebu Doctors' University Hospital, a major tertiary private hospital in Cebu City, the Philippines
