= ShorePoint Health Punta Gorda =

- AdventHealth
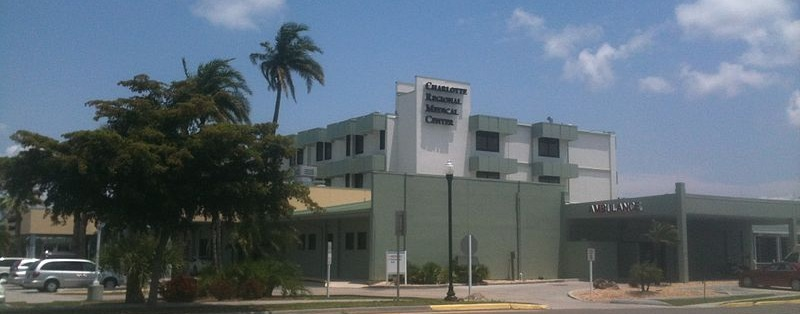
- ShorePoint Health Punta Gorda, as seen from the Riverside Behavioral Center

Geography
- Location: 809 East Marion Avenue, Punta Gorda, Florida, United States
- Coordinates: 26°56′27″N 82°02′24″W

Organization
- Care system: Private hospital
- Type: General hospital

Services
- Standards: Joint Commission
- Emergency department: Yes
- Beds: 208

History
- Former names: Charlotte Hospital; Charlotte Community Hospital; Medical Center; Medical Center Hospital; Charlotte Regional Medical Center; Bayfront Health Punta Gorda
- Constructed: 1945
- Opened: August 17, 1947
- Closed: September 25, 2024

Links
- Lists: Hospitals in Florida

ShorePoint Health Punta Gorda, was a hospital in Punta Gorda, Florida, United States owned by AdventHealth. The hospital was purchased from Community Health Systems in March 2025. The tertiary facility had multiple specialties when it closed. The closed facility’s future under AdventHealth is unclear.

== History ==
=== Pre history ===
In the late 1930s, physician Walter B. Clement launched a campaign to build a hospital in Punta Gorda, and editor Leo Wotitzky of the Punta Gorda Herald announced it in his column. The Punta Gorda Rotary was the project's first donor, supplying $100. A stock company was founded after World War II, which sold shares for $100 to help raise money for the hospital.

=== 1945-1989 ===
Construction of Charlotte Hospital began in 1945, but the project was halted due to a lack of funds. The Charlotte Hospital Association was founded to raise more money for the hospital. Charlotte Hospital opened on August 17, 1947, becoming the first hospital in Charlotte County. It had 12 beds, an emergency department, X-ray and laboratory. It cost $80,000 to have the new hospital built. Before the hospital was built physicians and patients traveled to Arcadia, Fort Myers and Tampa. The need in Charlotte County was so great that the hospital expanded to 25 beds two years later, and added an X-ray room, operating theatre, delivery room, nursery and kitchen. In 1959, Charlotte Hospital changed its name to Charlotte Community Hospital.

In 1960, a south wing was built for $100,000, increasing the number of beds to 40. In 1963, a north wing was built, increasing the number of beds to 75. In 1965, an intensive care unit with 13 beds was added. A new laboratory and a sixty-bed nursing home were added, increasing the number of beds to 148. The nursing home was later sold. The construction was funded by a $575,000 grant, matched by fundraisers, donations, and loans. In 1966, Charlotte Community Hospital changed its name to Medical Center. In 1969, it was purchased by the Seventh-day Adventist Church and renamed Medical Center Hospital. By 1973, it was part of Southern Adventist Health and Hospital Systems, Inc.

In 1981, a $3 million renovation of the emergency department was finished. Riverside Behavioral Center, a fifty-two bed psychiatric facility opened in 1984. In 1985, the Wellness and Rehabilitation Center opened, also the Cardiac Rehabilitation Center opened. In 1989, Medical Center Hospital performed its first open heart surgery.

=== 1990-2024 ===
The hospital purchased Home Health Services in 1990. In 1994, Adventist Health System sold the hospital to Health Management Associates, which renamed it Charlotte Regional Medical Center. The psychiatric facility was approved as a Baker Act facility by the Florida Department of Alcohol, Drug Abuse and Mental Health in 1998. In 1995, the hospital performed its first Rotablator coronary procedure. In 1996, a second cardiac catheterization laboratory opened. In 1997, a plethysmograph was purchased to help Charlotte Regional Medical Center better diagnose lung diseases. By 1998, the capacity at the hospital had increased to 208 beds. In 1999, plastic surgery was performed at Charlotte Regional Medical Center with lasers.

In 2002, the hospital was the first to offer brachytherapy for prostate cancer in Southwest Florida. In early January 2006, Charlotte Regional Medical Center gave a $10,000 endowment to Edison Community College in remembrance of Leo Wotitzky. In June, the hospital opened its Stroke Care Center.

On May 3, 2011, Charlotte Regional Medical Center became the first hospital in Charlotte County to use the da Vinci Surgical System. On June 27, 2013, Health Management Associates announced that Charlotte Regional Medical Center would be rebranding to Bayfront Health Punta Gorda. On July 30, it was announced that Community Health Systems would purchase Health Management Associates for $3.6 billion. On January 15, 2014, the hospital officially changed its name to Bayfront Health Punta Gorda. On January 27, Community Health Systems acquired Health Management Associates.

On November 30, 2021, Bayfront Health Punta Gorda was rebranded as ShorePoint Health Punta Gorda. On November 22, 2024, AdventHealth signed a definitive agreement to purchase ShorePoint Health Punta Gorda and its assets from Community Health Systems; also in the purchase agreement was ShorePoint Health Port Charlotte. The total sale price for the properties was $265 million. On March 1, 2025, ShorePoint Health became part of AdventHealth after being purchased for $260 million.

== Hurricane evacuations and aftermath ==
On August 14, 2004, ambulances and rescue vehicles were used to evacuate 110 patients from the hospital after it had part of its roof ripped off by Hurricane Charley. Also twenty-six patients from its mental health center were evacuated. On September 9 and 10, 2017, the hospital evacuated due to Hurricane Irma, which caused severe flooding to the facility. On September 22, the Agency for Health Care Administration gave the hospital permission to reopen. On September 25, 2024, the hospital was evacuated due to Hurricane Helene. The hospital's patients were moved by ambulance to ShorePoint Health Port Charlotte. The hospital received damage from the hurricane due to a storm surge, it also received more damage form Hurricane Milton. On December 19, it was announced that the hospital would not be reopening, due to the damage that it received. The majority of its employees transferred to ShorePoint Health Port Charlotte.

The closure of ShorePoint Health Punta Gorda has raised concerns in the Punta Gorda community, as residents now must travel to Port Charlotte, Fort Myers, or Arcadia for emergency medical care. Travel to Port Charlotte depends on operable bridges across the Peace River, and the alternative cities are somewhat distant.
