= AdventHealth Ocala =

- Marion County Hospital District

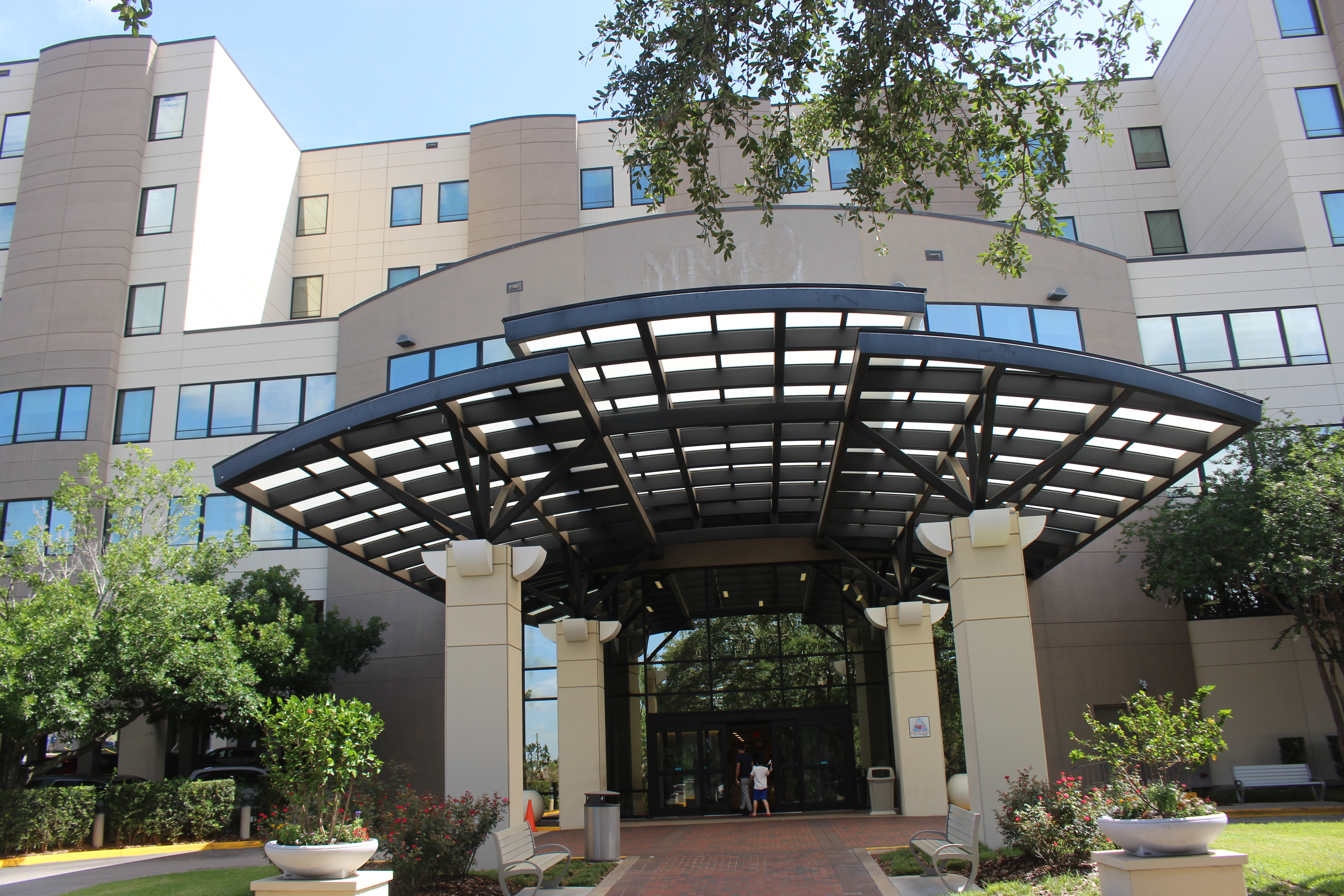

Geography
- Location: 1500 SW 1st Avenue, Ocala, Florida, United States
- Coordinates: 29°10′31″N 82°08′11″W

Organization
- Care system: Private hospital
- Type: Community hospital and General hospital
- Religious affiliation: Seventh-day Adventist Church
- Affiliated university: College of Central Florida
- Network: AdventHealth

Services
- Standards: Joint Commission
- Emergency department: Yes
- Beds: 385

Helipads
- Helipad: Aeronautical chart and airport information for 57FD at SkyVector

History
- Former names: Marion General Hospital; Munroe Memorial Hospital; Munroe Regional Medical Center; Florida Hospital Ocala
- Opened: 1898

Links
- Website: www.adventhealth.com/hospital/adventhealth-ocala
- Lists: Hospitals in Florida

Florida Hospital Ocala, Inc. (doing business as AdventHealth Ocala) is a non-profit hospital campus in Ocala, Florida, United States that is operated by AdventHealth. The medical facility is owned by the Marion County Hospital District. It is a tertiary, comprehensive stroke center, and primary stroke center that has multiple specialties. The hospital district was largely funded by the $213 million paid to the district by Community Health Systems in 2014 for the right to operate this facility. CHS sold their lease to Adventist Health System in 2018.

== History ==
=== 1898-2003 ===
In 1898, Marion General Hospital was founded. The impetus for building a local hospital was a man being run over by a horse and wagon. The initial location was a three-story building owned by the publisher of the local newspaper, the Star–Banner, which was leased to the new hospital until 1901.

The hospital operated in makeshift housing until 1915 when additional land was purchased for the hospital to expand. A three-story hospital building was constructed and was able to treat up to 50 patients in an emergency. In 1927, local residents approved a bond to build an expanded four-story building that could handle 73 patients. It was built on the same site and is still in use today as the northernmost building of the hospital. In 1928, the hospital was renamed to Munroe Memorial Hospital in honor of community leader T.T. Munroe, a local banker, who gathered community support and led the push to expand the hospital.

By the early 1960s, the hospital had grown to 130 beds. In 1980, the hospital was again renamed to Munroe Regional Medical Center. The hospital expanded to 323 beds in 1994 and 421 beds in 2003.

=== 2012-2019 ===
In 2012, hospital supporters proposed a tax for the hospital. The voters in November rejected the tax proposal. In late April 2013, Health Management Associates and their partner UF Health Shands Hospital were chosen to operate Munroe Regional Medical Center. They would operate the 421 bed hospital for forty years. Another bidder for the hospital was Duke LifePoint Healthcare. The trustees of the Marion County Hospital District approved the lease unanimously. The trustees would create a foundation to spend the $212.8 million, that Health Management Associates are required to pay the Marion County Hospital District. Health Management Associates would make $225 million in approvements to the hospital, while UF Health Shands Hospital would spend $10 million on academic and medical expertise.

In early December 2014, Munroe Regional Medical Center told the Florida Department of Health that it was going to apply to become a Level II trauma center. In late March 2015, the hospital changed its mind about building a trauma center, since Ocala Regional Medical Center already had a Level II trauma center.

On April 18, 2018, Community Health Systems sold its forty-year lease of Munroe Regional Medical Center to Adventist Health System. On August 1, 2018, Adventist Health System acquired Munroe Regional Medical Center and its TimberRidge ER. Florida Hospital a subsidiary of Adventist Health System began to operate the hospital and it was renamed to Florida Hospital Ocala. On January 2, 2019, the hospital was renamed to AdventHealth Ocala, when Adventist Health System rebranded to AdventHealth.

=== 2021-present ===
In April 2020, the Director of Pharmacy at the hospital developed a pharmacotherapy regime named ICAM. In May, it began treating COVID-19 patients with it and had a success of 96.4 percent. ICAM is mad up of antibiotics, blood thinners, steroids and vitamins. On December 22, frontline workers at AdventHealth Ocala received the Pfizer-BioNTech COVID-19 vaccine. On January 1, 2021, all hospitals were required to have their chargemaster on its website by the Centers for Medicare & Medicaid Services. In early February 2023, almost all of the AdventHealth hospitals had their chargemaster on their website, including AdventHealth Ocala.

On February 15, 2022, AdventHealth Ocala received a donation of $1.7 million from local philanthropists for the McKenzie Kearney Gray Maternal Fetal Medicine program. The program is named after a girl who died after she was born, the hospitals program began in the fall. On June 7, the hospital revealed three new ambulances that it purchased.

In late April 2024, there was a groundbreaking for a medical office building. On June 12, 2025, it opened for $40 million.

== Active shooter drill lawsuit ==
In July and August 2022, AdventHealth Ocala was sued by five nurses who alleged false imprisonment and emotional distress during an active shooter drill in November 2021. The lawsuits allege that an AdventHealth Ocala employee posed as a gunman at the direction of hospital management, simulated gunfire, told the nurses to lay on the ground and demanded drugs.

The lawsuits allege that it was 10 minutes before the nurses learned they were experiencing a drill. Two of the nurses claim that they were being treated for post-traumatic stress disorder as a result of the events they experienced during the drill.

== Partnership ==
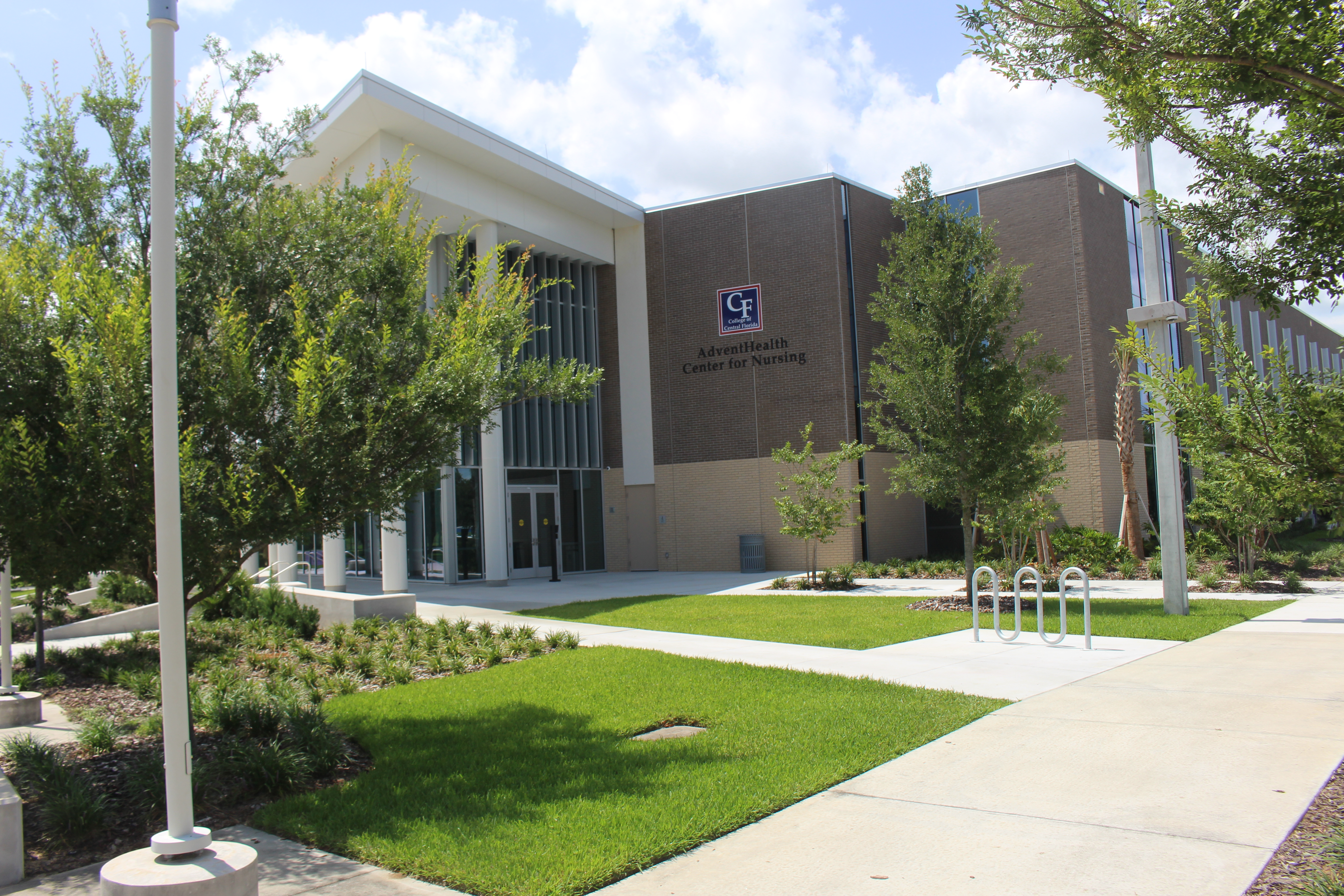
AdventHealth Center for Nursing

In September 2024, AdventHealth Ocala gave two financial endowments totaling $3 million to the CF Foundation. The AdventHealth Nursing Endowment and the AdventHealth Sciences Endowment will go to purchasing equipment and student scholarships. On January 30, 2025, the 42,500 square foot (3,950 m^{2}), AdventHealth Center for Nursing opened on the campus of College of Central Florida. Money to have the nursing center built came from AdventHealth Ocala, the Marion County Hospital District, the Florida Legislature, Marion County Board of Commissioners and others.

== Awards and recognitions ==
AdventHealth Ocala received a grade B from The Leapfrog Group in spring 2019, 2020, 2021 and 2022; it received a grade A in 2023, 2024, 2025 and 2026. On December 4, 2025, it was recognized by Forbes in its new Top Hospitals list with a four-star ranking.

== See also ==
- List of Seventh-day Adventist hospitals
- List of stroke centers in the United States
