= HRMC =

HRMC may refer to:

Hospitals:

- Healthmark Regional Medical Center, a hospital in Florida, US
- Highlands Regional Medical Center, a hospital in Kentucky, US

Other:

- the Hasaka Revolutionary Military Council of the Free Syrian Army
- Higher Rate Mobility Component of the Disability Living Allowance, a type of disability benefit in the United Kingdom
- Hybrid Reverse Monte Carlo, a mathematical modelling technique

== See also ==
- HM Revenue and Customs (HMRC)
