= AdventHealth Lake Wales =

- AdventHealth

Geography
- Location: 410 E. 11th Street, Lake Wales, Florida, United States
- Coordinates: 27.8958°N 81.5654°W

Organization
- Care system: Private hospital
- Type: General hospital
- Religious affiliation: Seventh-day Adventist Church

Services
- Standards: DNV Healthcare
- Emergency department: Yes
- Beds: 118

Helipads
- Helipad: No

History
- Former names: Lake Wales Hospital; Lake Wales Medical Center
- Opened: March 12, 1930

Links
- Website: www.adventhealth.com/hospital/adventhealth-lake-wales
- Other links: Hospitals in Florida

AdventHealth Polk South, Inc. (doing business as AdventHealth Lake Wales) is a non-profit hospital campus in Lake Wales, Florida, United States owned by AdventHealth. The medical facility is a tertiary and primary stroke center that has multiple specialties. It was purchased from Community Health Systems in May 2019.

== History ==
=== 1928–1999 ===
In 1928, June Hobbs and a nurse opened Lake Wales' first hospital; it had nine beds and was in a two-story apartment. About one year later it closed. In 1929, Lake Wales, Highland Park and Mountain Lake raised $80,000 to build a 25-bed hospital. Lake Wales Hospital opened on March 12, 1930. Additional bedrooms were added in 1948 and 1956, increasing the number of beds to 60. In 1965, a new 110-bed hospital was built. Nine years later the third floor opened, increasing the number of beds to 154, and the original hospital became a medical office building.

In 1985, construction workers began the construction of the Deeley A. Hunt Building, a 120-bed nursing home attached to the hospital. In 1993, Lake Wales Hospital merged with its nursing home and was renamed Lake Wales Medical Centers. Also in 1993, the hospital became part of Mid Florida Medical Services. In late November 1999, the Winter Haven Hospital Board of Trustees voted unanimously on expansion and renovation of Lake Wales Medical Center. They also approved the demolition of the former hospital.

=== 2000–2009 ===
In late June 2000, Lake Wales Medical Centers announced that it would have a new emergency department with private treatment rooms constructed; it would double the size of the emergency department. The intensive care unit would be moved to the second floor. Ambulatory surgery would be moved to the first story and take over the former ICU and emergency department. The surgical suit would be expanded. Two of the primary emergency treatment rooms would become endoscopy rooms. In early February 2001, the hospital wanted to move its medical records, human resources and housekeeping to the first story of the nursing home. Before they could be moved it had to get permission from the Agency for Health Care Administration to change the license of the first story. Demolition of the old hospital started in August, it would take two to three months to demolish and cost $5 to 6 million due to asbestos.

In January 2002, construction workers started to construct the new emergency department. In late May 2003, Lake Wales Medical Center's 14,000 square foot (1,300 m^{2}) emergency department opened to patients; it cost $4.5 million to build.

In late July 2002, Mid Florida Medical Services decided to sell the hospital after hearing from local residents. In early September, both Community Health Systems and Health Management Associates were interested in buying the hospital. On December 2, Lake Wales Medical Centers was purchased by Community Health Systems from Mid-Florida Medical Services.

In August 2007, renovations at the hospital were completed at a cost of $6.9 million. In December 2008, a $4 million renovation began on the Deeley A. Hunt Building after the nursing home closed. The space was renovated to contain a board room, offices, reception room, education space and thirty-two private patient rooms. Three of the patient rooms are designed for obesity and three others can be used as negative-pressure rooms. In early May 2009, the former nursing home space at Lake Wales Medical Center was opened to the public.

=== 2018–present ===
On January 9, 2018, construction workers broke ground on a new 5,100 square foot (470 m^{2}) wound healing center at the hospital, it would be double the size of the old facility. The wound healing center was completed at the end of 2018 and included six treatment rooms, three hyperbaric chambers, waiting area and a lobby. On May 22, 2019, AdventHealth signed a definitive agreement to purchase Lake Wales Medical Center from Community Health Systems. On September 1, AdventHealth took over the management of Lake Wales Medical Center, it had purchased the hospital for $10,146,000 and renamed it AdventHealth Lake Wales.

On January 1, 2021, all hospitals were required to have their chargemaster on its website by the Centers for Medicare & Medicaid Services. In early February, 2023, almost all of the AdventHealth hospitals had their chargemaster on their website, including AdventHealth Lake Wales.

== Services ==
In mid January 2024, the hospital added a mammography unit.

== Charity giving ==
In late October 2025, AdventHealth Lake Wales donated medical supplies to Webber International University after a fire destroyed its athletic training room.

== Awards and recognitions ==
The hospital's wound healing center has been recognized by Healogics, with the Center of Excellence Award four consecutive years and the Center of Distinction Award five consecutive years. AdventHealth Lake Wales received a grade A from The Leapfrog Group in 2025 and 2026.

== See also ==
- List of Seventh-day Adventist hospitals
- List of stroke centers in the United States
