= Holmes Regional Medical Center =

- Health First

Geography
- Location: Melbourne, Florida, United States
- Coordinates: 28.0874231°N 80.6143055°W

Services
- Emergency department: Level II trauma center
- Beds: 537

History
- Opened: 1928

Links
- Lists: Hospitals in Florida

The Holmes Regional Medical Center is a not-for-profit hospital operated by Health First. It is located in Melbourne, Florida. It is a 514-bed facility, including the only level II trauma center in Brevard County. It also operates Brevard's only Level II Neonatal ICU.

In 2010, the hospital had 38.8 percent of the patient admissions in the county, 23,250, twice the number of its nearest competitor in the county admitted.

== History ==
In 1928 Dr. Isaac Hay opened what is now considered the first local hospital from which the current hospital traces its origin. In 1933, Mr. and Mrs. John Rhodes donated land for a hospital, in addition, a loan of $30,000 for a hospital's construction was obtained under the National Industrial Recovery Act. the Hospital was opened in 1937 on U.S 1.

In 1953, James E. Holmes was elected to the Hospital's Board of Governors, serving as its president for the next 25 years, until 1978. In 1956, the city granted the hospital 10 acres (4.0 ha) on what is now the current site on Hickory street, leading to the hospital expanding in 1962 to 101 beds in a four-story building. by 1966, the hospital cared for 10,421 patients, 1420 new babies and 37,165 outpatients. In 1969, the hospital was expanded with the addition of a north wing, increasing the hospital's capacity to 331 beds. in 1978, as Holmes retired from the board, the hospital was named after him, and in 1983, the hospital's capacity was expanded by 206 beds, at the cost of $43 million.

In 1986, the hospital constructed what was then the region's only complete cardiovascular program, and in 2004, the hospital was listed in Money magazine as "one of America's top hospitals" for Intervention Cardiology and Stroke Care. In 2011, it had 55.1% of its admissions through the emergency room, less than any other hospital in Brevard and below the state average of 61.6%. Some of this difference can be explained by procedural differences in how hospitals admit patients.

== Procedures ==
In the year ending June 2010, there were 899 hospitalizations for angioplasty, the most selected surgery.
