= GCMC =

GCMC may refer to:

- Gulf Coast Medical Center
- George C. Marshall European Center for Security Studies
- General Conference Mennonite Church
- Grand Canonical Monte Carlo methods, a computational technique used to solve physical and mathematical problems such as molecular modeling.
