= Southwest Florida Regional Medical Center =

Geography
- Location: 2727 Winkler Avenue, Fort Myers, Florida, United States
- Coordinates: 26.606373°N 81.857445°W

Organization
- Care system: Private (1974-2006), Public (2007-2009)
- Type: General

Services
- Standards: JCAHO accreditation
- Beds: 400

History
- Founded: 1974
- Closed: 2009

Links
- Website: www.swfrmc.com
- Lists: Hospitals in Florida

Southwest Florida Regional Medical Center was a 400-bed general hospital in Fort Myers, Florida. Then Ft Myers Community Hospital was originally developed by a subsidiary of Basic American Industries (BAI) called Basic American Medical in 1974. BAI was based in Indianapolis, Indiana. The first executive director of the hospital was John Gass. The hospital later became part of the Columbia Hospital Corporation family of hospitals and continued to operate under Columbia/HCA until it was purchased by Lee Memorial Health System along with sister facility Gulf Coast Hospital in late 2006. It was merged with GCH to form the new Gulf Coast Medical Center in Fort Myers in March 2009, leaving the old SWFRMC building unused.

== Closing ==
While the hospital was still owned by HCA, the building was surveyed for possible renovations by independent contractors. Due to deteriorizations, it was determined that it would be better to build a new hospital than to renovate SWFRMC, so HCA began to construct expansions to Gulf Coast Hospital with plans to merge the facilities. When Lee Memorial Health System took over the hospital, they surveyed the SWFRMC facility for possible reuse as well, only to come to the same conclusion as the contractors hired by HCA. LMHS continued the expansions to GCH as planned by HCA. When expansions were finally completed in March 2009, all patients, staff, and equipment were transferred to the new Gulf Coast Medical Center. Lee County paramedics treated the transfer of patients as an emergency evacuation drill. As a final farewell to the facility, staff members signed their names and start dates on the interior walls of the hospital in permanent marker before leaving, and some left hand prints in colorful paint. The building was demolished in November 2009 to make way for a new distribution center for medical supplies.
