= HCA Florida Raulerson Hospital =

- HCA Healthcare

Geography
- Location: 1796 Highway 441N, Okeechobee, Florida, United States
- Coordinates: 27.2599°N 80.8287°W

Organization
- Care system: Private hospital
- Type: General hospital

Services
- Emergency department: Yes
- Beds: 100

History
- Former name: Raulerson Hospital

Links
- Website: http://raulersonhospital.com/
- Lists: Hospitals in Florida

HCA Florida Raulerson Hospital is a hospital in Okeechobee, Florida, United States owned by HCA Healthcare. The hospital system includes the hospital proper and a building more than a block north, at 1930 Highway 441N, that houses a workers' compensation clinic.

== Services ==
Raulerson Hospital contains most of its services within the hospital itself. It has emergency, outpatient services and surgery services, as well as inpatient floors. The hospital also has a sleep disorders center. At the building at 1930 Highway 441N is the Workers' Compensation Services unit.
