= ShorePoint Health Venice =

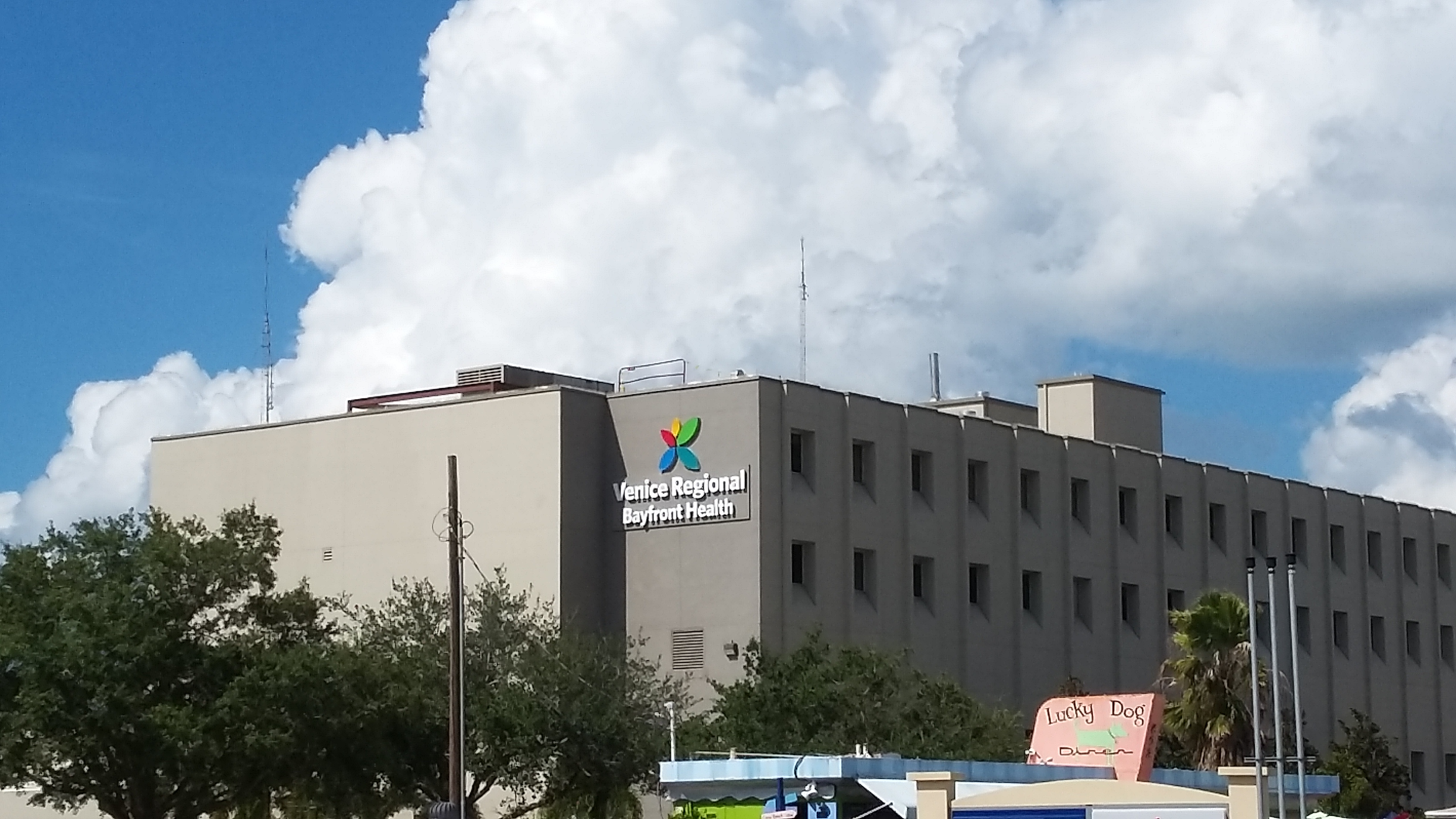

Geography
- Location: 540 The Rialto, Venice, Florida, United States
- Coordinates: 27°05′28″N 82°26′42″W

Organization
- Care system: Private
- Type: General

Services
- Standards: Joint Commission
- Emergency department: No
- Beds: 312

History
- Former names: South Sarasota County Memorial Hospital; Venice Memorial Hospital; Bon Secours Venice Hospital; Venice Regional Medical Center; Venice Regional Bayfront Health
- Founded: December 3, 1951
- Closed: September 22, 2022

Links
- Website: shorepointhealthvenice.com
- Lists: Hospitals in Florida

ShorePoint Health Venice was a private 312-bed health care facility located in Venice, Florida, United States.

== History ==
The hospital opened on December 3, 1951, as South Sarasota County Memorial Hospital with a capacity of 14 beds. After its dedication, the hospital was renamed to Venice Memorial Hospital in February 1952. The hospital was put up for sale in 1995 after the board of directors determined it would be in debt if it continued operations. In 1995, the board of directors decided to sell the hospital to Bon Secours Sisters, which renamed it to Bon Secours Venice Hospital. In August 2004, Bon Secours sold Venice Hospital to Health Management Associates (HMA), which renamed it to Venice Regional Medical Center. On January 27, 2014, Community Health Systems acquired Health Management Associates for $7.6 billion, which renamed it to Venice Regional Bayfront Health.

On November 30, 2021, Venice Regional Bayfront Health was rebranded as ShorePoint Health Venice.

The hospital ceased emergency services on August 29, 2022, and ceased all services on September 22, 2022. No WARN-compliant notice was provided to employees. Community Health Systems blamed new completion from Sarasota Memorial Health Care's facility in Osprey for the closure, even though it abandoned plans in November 2020 to construct a new hospital facility in unincorporated Sarasota County.

In 2023, it was reported that the property has sold with the new owners intending to reopen the facility as a hospital.
