= HCA Florida Capital Hospital =

Hospital in Tallahassee, Florida, US

Coordinates: 30.47622°N 84.23154°W

- HCA Healthcare
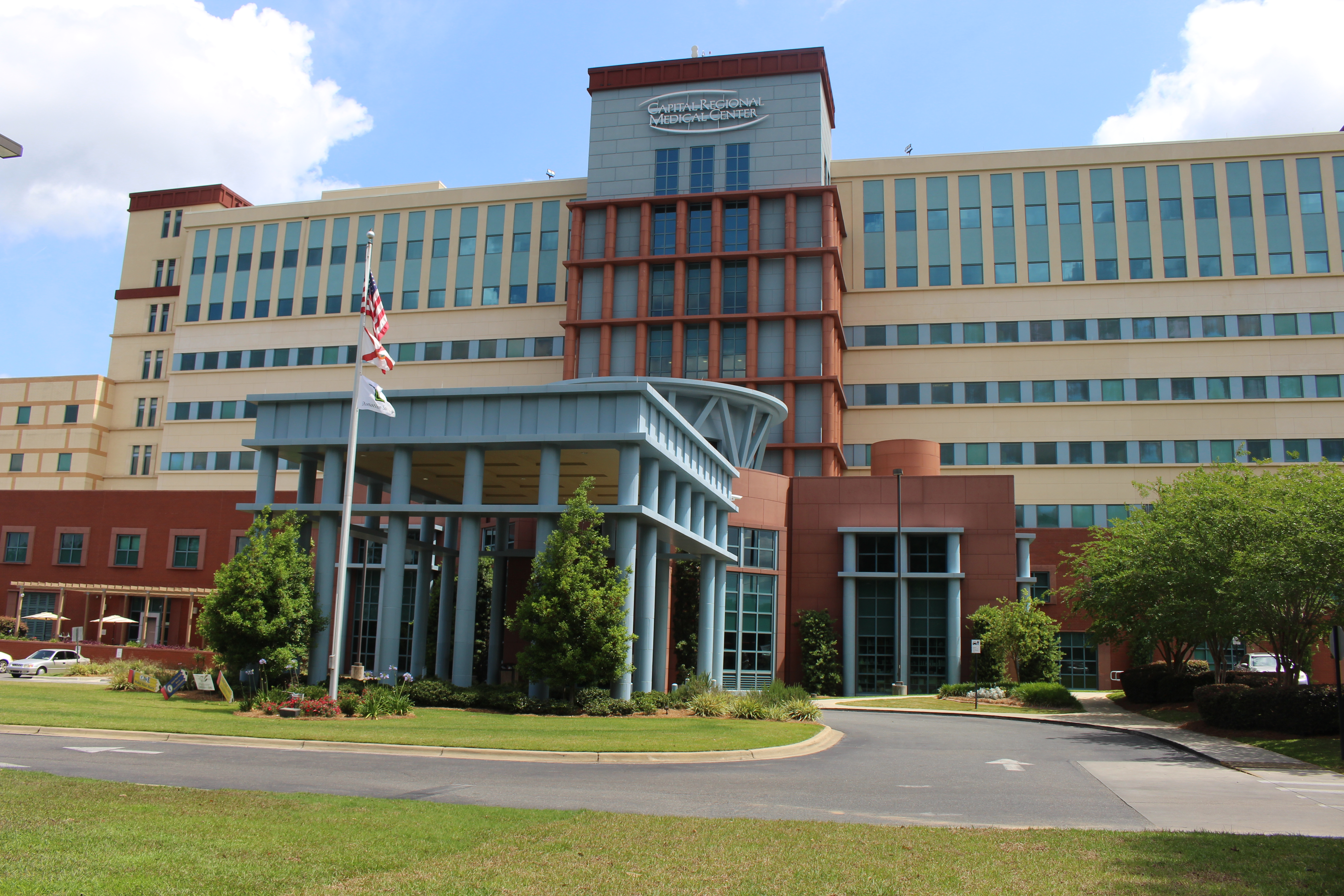
- HCA Florida Capital Hospital main entrance

Geography
- Location: 2626 Capital Medical Boulevard, Tallahassee, Florida, United States

Organization
- Care system: Private hospital
- Type: General hospital

Services
- Emergency department: Yes

History
- Former name: Capital Regional Medical Center

Links
- Lists: Hospitals in Florida

HCA Florida Capital Hospital is a hospital in Tallahassee, Florida, United States owned by HCA Healthcare. A fully accredited healthcare facility, it has more than 1,100 employees, approximately 500 physicians, and 266 beds. It includes a Bariatric Center, Comprehensive Breast Center, Cancer Center, Family Center, Accredited Chest Pain Center w/PCI, 24/7 Emergency Services in Leon & Gadsden Counties, Certified Primary Stroke Center, Surgical Services, Heart & Vascular Center, Wound Care Center, Seniors First and affiliated physician practices. US News ranks best hospitals in the nation. Moreover, it ranks best hospitals in each state and metro area. Based on US News, Capital Regional Medical Center in Tallahassee, FL is rated high performing in 1 adult procedure or condition - general medical and surgical facility ( back surgery - spinal fusions).

== History ==
In 1974, real estate agent Jim Tully purchased a ten-acre parcel of land as the site for a new hospital in Tallahassee. At the time, the wait required for non-emergency surgery at Tallahassee Memorial Hospital could be six weeks. Tully organized a group of five doctors and five investors who applied for and were granted a Certificate of need (CON) from the Florida Agency for Health Care Administration. This permit was required before a new medical facility could be established. The land and CON were sold to Nashville's General Care Corporation, a company that owned seven other hospitals.

During construction, a sign on Capital Circle identified the future hospital and planned health care facilities as the Jim Tully Center. The $7-million facility opened in September 1979 as Capital Medical Center. In September 1980, GCC was purchased by HCA Healthcare and became part of a multi-billion-dollar corporation. It was renamed HCA Tallahassee Community Hospital in January 1982. In 1982 and 1983, gained a CT Scan service and opened its family center.

In June 1985, Florida's Health and Rehabilitative Services granted TCH a Certificate of Need to expand and renovate, resulting in the 1986 opening of a cardiac catheterization lab, and the beginning of an $11 million expansion and renovation project. In 1988, HRS issued a final approval for TCH's renovated and expanded physical plant; and in April 1989, it issued final approval for TCH's open-heart surgical program.

The name was changed to Capital Regional Medical Center in 2003 when the hospital shifted to a new facility built adjacent to the original. The $105 million construction was designed by Driehaus Prize winner and New Classical architect Michael Graves in conjunction with Nashville architects, Thomas, Miller & Partners.
