= HCA Florida Pasadena Hospital =

- HCA Healthcare

Geography
- Location: 1501 Pasadena Avenue, St. Petersburg, Florida, United States
- Coordinates: 27.75269°N 82.73938°W

Organization
- Care system: Private hospital
- Type: General hospital

Services
- Beds: 307

History
- Former name: Palms of Pasadena Hospital

Links
- Website: www.hcafloridahealthcare.com/locations/pasadena-hospital%20https://www.hcafloridahealthcare.com/locations/pasadena-hospital
- Lists: Hospitals in Florida

HCA Florida Pasadena Hospital is a hospital in St. Petersburg, Florida, United States owned by HCA Healthcare.
