= Lakeland Regional Health Medical Center =

- Lakeland Regional Health
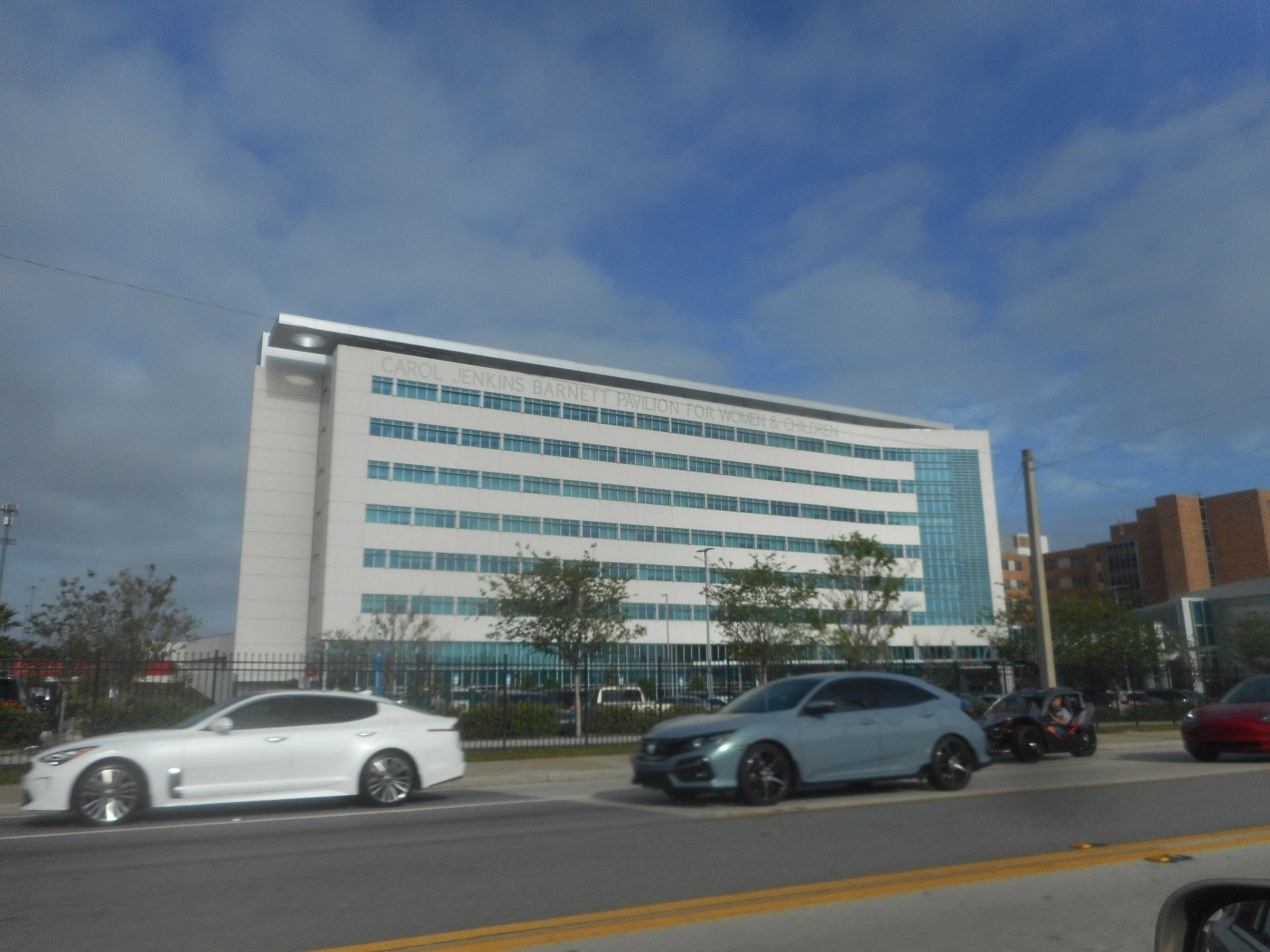
- Carol Jenkins Barnett Pavilion for Women and Children at the Lakeland Regional Health Medical Center

Geography
- Location: Lakeland, Florida, United States
- Coordinates: 28.061°N 81.954°W

Services
- Emergency department: Provisional Level I
- Beds: 892

Helipads
- Helipad: FAA LID: 7FD7

History
- Founded: 1916

Links
- Website: www.mylrh.org/medical-center/
- Lists: Hospitals in Florida

Lakeland Regional Health Medical Center is a non-profit, 892-bed hospital in Lakeland, Florida, owned and operated by Lakeland Regional Health.

== History ==
Mrs. F.A. Morrell, upon her death in 1914, bequeathed a parcel of land on South Missouri Avenue to the City of Lakeland for the express purpose of establishing a community hospital to serve Polk County residents. A bond issue to fund the creation of the hospital passed on October 7, 1914. Architect A.J. Poteet designed the hospital, and E.C. Angell was awarded the construction contract in December 1915. The cornerstone was laid on February 24, 1916, and Morrell Memorial Hospital officially opened its doors on August 11, 1916, with a capacity of 65 beds and a staff of 24.

== Services ==
Lakeland Regional Health Medical Center is designated as a provisional Level I trauma center and, as of 2021, has the second busiest emergency department in the nation with over 190,500 visits per year. The hospital is also an accredited chest pain center with primary PCI and resuscitation, and a thrombectomy-capable stroke center. The hospital also houses the Carol Jenkins Barnett Pavilion for Women and Children and a level III NICU.
