= HCA Florida Englewood Hospital =

- HCA Healthcare

Geography
- Location: 700 Medical Blvd, Englewood, Florida, United States
- Coordinates: 26°57′00″N 82°19′35″W

Organization
- Care system: Private
- Type: Community

Services
- Standards: Joint Commission
- Emergency department: Yes
- Beds: 100

History
- Former name: Englewood Community Hospital
- Founded: 1985

Links
- Website: www.hcafloridahealthcare.com/locations/englewood-hospital
- Lists: Hospitals in Florida

HCA Florida Englewood Hospital is a private 100-bed health care facility located in Englewood, Florida, United States owned by HCA Healthcare.

== History ==
The hospital opened in 1985 (as Englewood Community Hospital) and specializes in treating heart disease, general surgery, emergency care, urology, and orthopedics.
