= NCH Healthcare System =

Healthcare system in Naples, Florida

Coordinates: 26.272°N 81.7880°W

- Formerly: Naples Community Hospital
- Type: Not-for-profit
- Industry: Health care
- Founded: 1953; 73 years ago
- Headquarters: Naples, Florida, U.S.
- Area served: Southwest Florida
- Key people: Paul Hiltz (CEO)
- Revenue: 632 million (2020)
- Total assets: 1.01 billion (2020)
- Number of employees: 5,000 (2024)
- Website: www.nchmd.org

The NCH Healthcare System (NCH) is a not-for-profit, healthcare system located in Naples, Florida, United States with 4300 employees as of 2021, of which 730 are staff physicians. The healthcare system consists of two hospitals: the Baker Hospital located in downtown Naples and the North Naples campus. The hospitals have a total of 713 beds. The system operates walk-in centers and outpatient rehabilitation facilities in Naples, North Naples, Marco Island, and Bonita Springs. Naples Diagnostic Imaging Center is an affiliate of the system.

== History ==
The healthcare system was founded in 1953. The Naples Community Hospital opened in downtown Naples on March 5, 1956, with 50 beds. In 1966, the hospital added 50 more beds, an emergency department and several specialized departments. Later that decade, several more departments were added, including an intensive care unit. The hospital expanded the original building in 1970 to six stories and began construction on a new, two-story building next door. This building was later expanded to six stories and was dubbed the "South Tower" while the first tower was called the "North Tower". Construction on the Downtown Naples facility continued in the 1980s, and on October 15, 1984, the North Collier Health Center opened its doors. This facility was opened as a satellite facility of the main hospital. Another satellite facility opened on February 4, 1985, on Marco Island with a helipad.

In January 1990, North Collier Hospital (the North Naples campus) opened with 50 beds on Immokalee Road in North Naples. The healthcare system and the local population continued to grow during this decade. In February 2007, the system expanded once again with the opening of the $64 million Jay & Patty Baker Patient Care Tower at the North Naples hospital.

In 2020, NCH purchased a 186,000-square-foot office building on Immokalee Road to relocate some of its administrative support and non-clinical functions. NCH also started a $35 million renovation and expansion of its Baker Hospital emergency room with a two-story, 19,000 square foot addition to expand its emergency room capacity to 47,000 square feet, with expected completion in February 2022.

NCH was also ranked "among the top 250 hospitals in the U.S.", according to Healthgrades 2020 rankings, placing it in the top 5% of hospitals nationwide within the evaluation criteria, although it received a "D" grade from Leapfrog Group's hospital safety grades. NCH filed and then dropped a lawsuit against Leapfrog, claiming they did not participate in the survey and received the low grade as a result.

NCH's chief executive officer is Paul Hiltz, who assumed the role on September 3, 2019.
