= Health First =

Non-profit health system in Florida

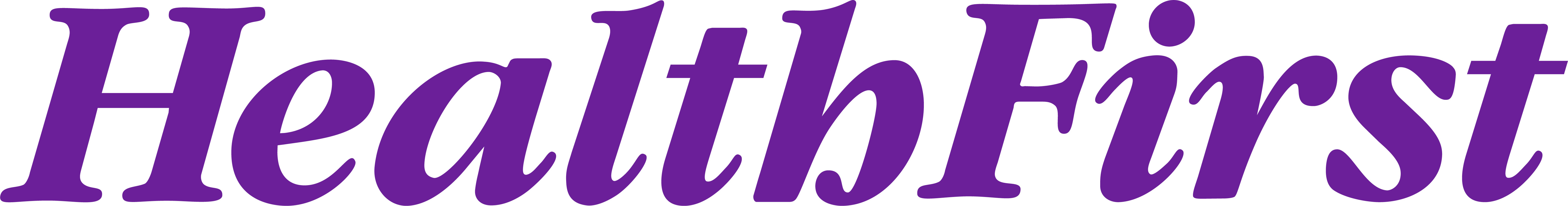
Health First logo

Health First is a not-for-profit community health system located in Brevard County, Florida.

Founded in 1995, Health First is Brevard County's largest healthcare system, operating four hospitals at near-capacity daily. Its hospitals include Cape Canaveral Hospital, Holmes Regional Medical Center, Palm Bay Hospital and Viera Hospital, and the system is home to the county's only Level II Trauma Center.

Health First also includes Health First Health Plans, which offers a variety of health insurance options across Central Florida, and Health First Medical Group, a multi-specialty physician group. Health First also offers outpatient and wellness services, including fitness centers, home care, hospice care, aging services, and family pharmacies.

In September 2026, Health First cut over 200 jobs, reported as roughly 2% of its workforce. As part of the layoffs, Health First reported it would be winding up its Hospital at Home program.

== Procedures ==
In the year ending June 2010, there were 899 hospitalizations for angioplasty, the most selected surgery. There were 1,000 C-sections, and more than 1,000 knee replacements. Holmes had 228 open-heart surgeries. They cost from $108,377 to $139,040.
