= HCA Florida Sarasota Doctors Hospital =

- HCA Healthcare

Geography
- Location: 5731 Bee Ridge Road, Sarasota, Florida, United States
- Coordinates: 27°18′7″N 82°27′12″W

Organization
- Care system: Private
- Type: General

Services
- Standards: Joint Commission
- Emergency department: Yes
- Beds: 155

History
- Former name: Doctors Hospital of Sarasota
- Founded: 1967

Links
- Website: doctorsofsarasota.com
- Lists: Hospitals in Florida

HCA Florida Sarasota Doctors Hospital is a hospital in Sarasota, Florida, Florida, United States owned by HCA Healthcare.

In March 2018, Doctors Hospital opened a freestanding emergency room in nearby Manatee County, Florida named Doctors Hospital of Sarasota ER in Lakewood Ranch.

The hospital was renamed to its current name in June 2022.
