= Gulf Coast Medical Center =

Coordinates: 26.5451869°N 81.8492062°W

Gulf Coast Medical Center (GCMC)

Geography
- Location: 13681 Doctors Way, Fort Myers, Florida, United States

Organization
- Type: General

Services
- Emergency department: Beds: 70, Exam Rooms: 28, Treatment Rooms: 33, Observation Units: 10, Operating Rooms: 22
- Beds: 699 (584 Private Rooms)

History
- Opened: March 2009; Combined: Southwest Florida Regional Medical Center (founded in 1974) and Gulf Coast Hospital (founded in 1990).

Links
- Website: www.leehealth.org/facilities/gulf-coast-medical-center.asp
- Lists: Hospitals in Florida

Gulf Coast Medical Center (GCMC) is a 699-bed hospital located in Fort Myers, Florida.

== History ==
Gulf Coast Medical Center was created through the merging of Southwest Florida Regional Medical Center and Gulf Coast Hospital in March 2009. Both were for-profit hospitals owned by Hospital Corporation of America.

Gulf Coast Hospital and Southwest Florida Regional Medical Center joined Lee Memorial Health Systems in 2006 before the merger, though the merger was planned before the change of ownership.

Gulf Coast Medical Center wraps around the former Gulf Coast Hospital and consists of 436,000 square feet of new construction and 20,000 square feet of renovation to the former facility. Construction required over 800 miles of electrical wire, 3,100 tons of steel and 5,500 tons of concrete.

== Patient care and services ==
Since 2018, Gulf Coast Medical Center has seen over 47,000 patients visit its facility annually.

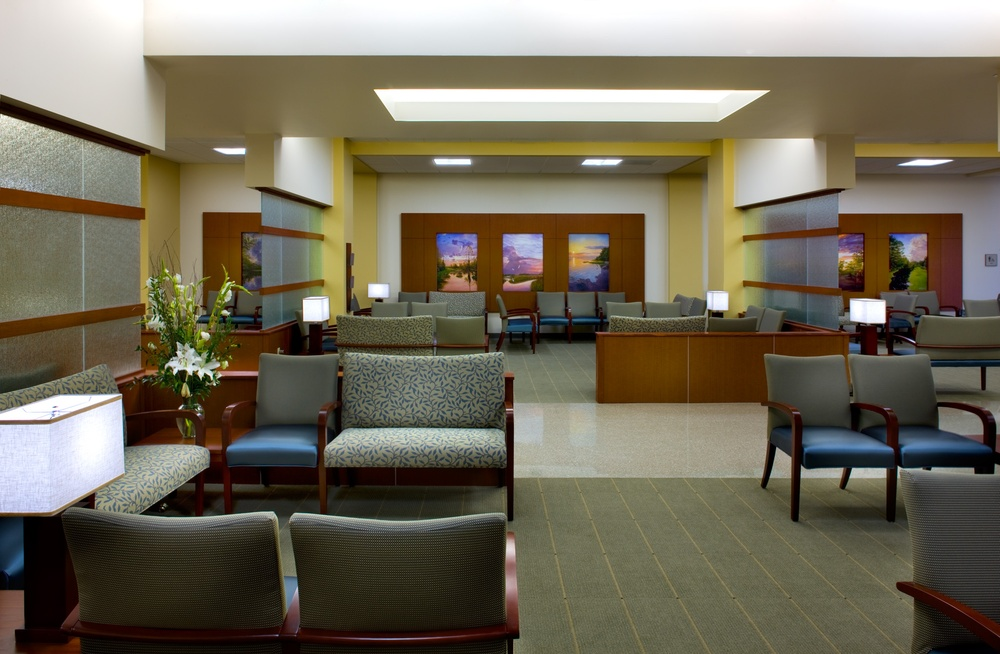
GCMC Surgical Waiting Area

Major services provided at Gulf Coast Medical Center include neuroscience, orthopedics, and general surgery.

Gulf Coast Medical Center is an accredited Comprehensive Stroke Center which has the physician coverage and technology to treat all stroke patients, including bleeding strokes—such as those caused by brain aneurysms. With 24/7 access to minimally invasive catheter procedures to treat stroke; a dedicated neurosurgical intensive care unit; and on-site neurological availability, Gulf Coast Medical Center has the ability to treat stoke patients with a variety of complex procedures.

The radiology department features digital technology, such as the Picture Archive Computer System, or PACS, which enables physicians to view X-rays on a computer monitor and adjust the image for a better view. The department also has a state-of-the-art GE 128-slice HD Volume CT scanner, which is very beneficial to its stroke program.

The hospital's outpatient rehabilitation clinic utilizes a speech pathology procedure in which a fiber-optic endoscopic evaluation allows speech pathologists to see how patients swallow in real time without an X-ray.

Renal Transplant evaluation services are performed at Gulf Coast Medical Center in coordination with the Tampa General Renal Transplant Program.

== Awards and recognition ==
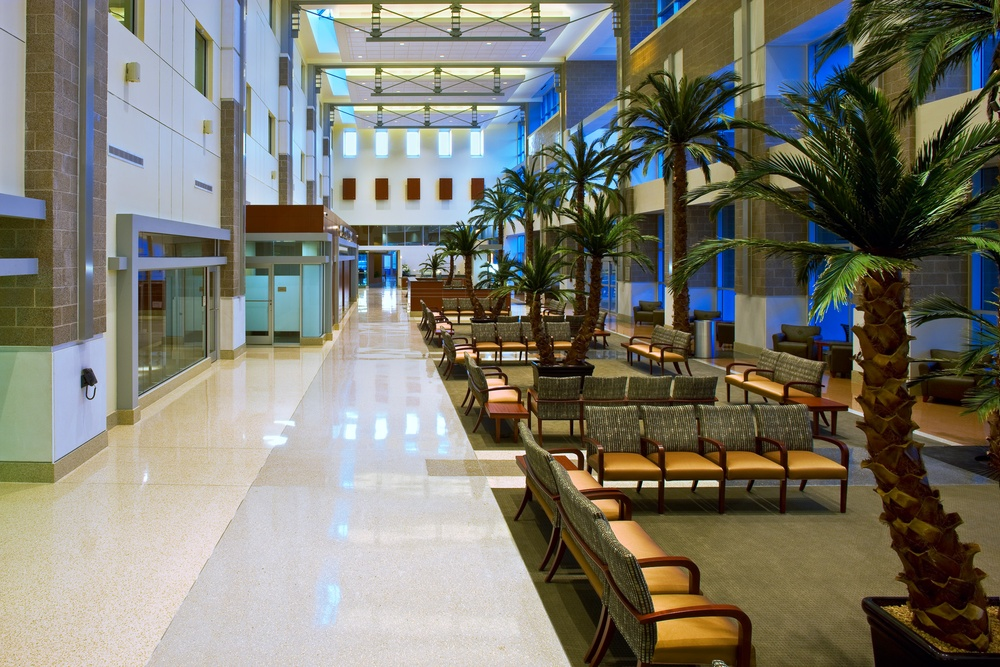
GCMC Main Lobby - South End

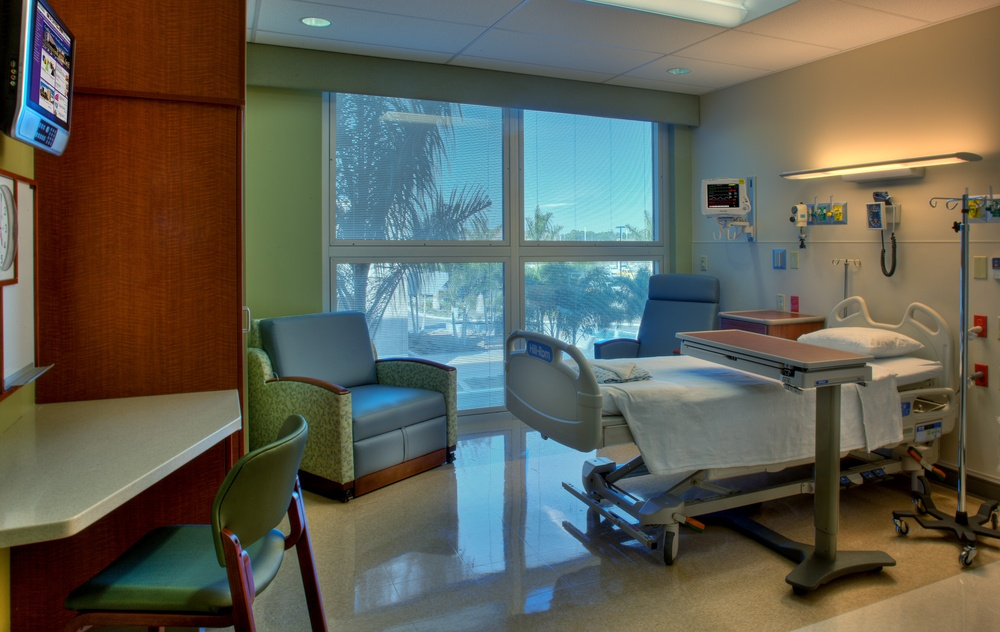
GCMC Individual Patient Rooms

In August 2014, Gulf Coast Medical Center was designated a top-level provider of stroke treatments.

Gulf Coast Medical Center is distinguished as a Gold Plus Stroke Center by the American Heart Association and American Stroke Association.

In a 2014 Soliant Health user-generated poll, Gulf Coast Medical Center was chosen as the runner-up to be America's Most Beautiful Hospital.

Gulf Coast Medical Center was ranked as one of Healthgrades America's 100 Best Hospitals for pulmonary care for two years in a row, 2012–2013.

In 2016, Gulf Coast Medical Center earned the American Heart Association/American Stroke Association's Gold Plus Stroke Center designation.
