= List of Trinity University people =

List of people associated with Trinity University

The following is a list of notable people associated with Trinity University.

== Arts and entertainment ==
- Myra Biggerstaff, art teacher
- Chingo Bling, born Pedro Herrera III (B.S., business administration marketing, 2001) – rapper and record executive
- Deanna Dunagan (M.A., drama) – actress who won the 2008 Tony Award for Best Actress in a Play
- Brunson Green (B.S., economics, 1991) – Academy Award-nominated producer of The Help
- Gibby Haynes (B.S., business administration, 1981) – lead singer of the Butthole Surfers, a rock band formed at Trinity
- David N. Johnson (B.Mus., music, 1950) – composer, organist, and professor
- Paul Leary (B.A., art, 1980) – member of the Butthole Surfers
- Kiel Martin – actor who played J. D. LaRue on Hill Street Blues
- Robert McCollum – voice actor affiliated with Funimation
- Donald Moffett (B.A., art, 1977) – painter
- Peter Mui (B.A.) – fashion designer and entrepreneur
- Emilio Nicolás Sr (M.A., 1952) – founder of Univision
- Naomi Shihab Nye (B.A., English, 1974) – poet, songwriter and novelist
- Clay Reynolds (M.A., English, 1974) – novelist and critic
- Jaclyn Smith – actress and model
- Bob West (B.A., art, 1978) – voice of Barney, the purple dinosaur seen on PBS children's programming
- Josh Wolf (B.A., communication, 1993) – comedian, actor, writer

== Athletics ==
- Kyle Altman (born 1986) – soccer player
- Pete Cole – football player, NFL, New York Giants 1937–1940 (guard); NFL Champions 1938, Pro Bowl 1938
- Frank Conner (B.S., business administration, 1970) – professional golfer, PGA and Champions Tour; tennis player
- Wes Gideon (born 1937) – professional Canadian football player
- Brian Gottfried (1972) – professional tennis player (# 3 in the world) and coach
- Jerry Grote (1962) – former Major League Baseball player
- Irv Hill (1908–1978) – American football running back in the National Football League for the Chicago Cardinals and Boston Redskins
- Darrell Hogan (B.S., physical education, 1949) – former NFL defensive lineman, Pittsburgh Steelers (1949–1953)
- Erick Iskersky (B.A., physical education, 1980) – former professional tennis player and three-time All American (1977–1979)
- Davey Johnson (B.A., mathematics, 1964) – former Major League Baseball player and manager
- Lance Key (B.A., philosophy, 2000) – three-time All-American soccer player; former player for the Colorado Rapids in Major League Soccer; former Trinity women's soccer coach, former Hardin-Simmons women's soccer coach
- Obert Logan (B.A., mathematics, 1965) – NFL safety, Dallas Cowboys (1965–66), New Orleans Saints (1967)
- Gretchen Magers (B.S., physical education, 1986) – former professional tennis player who reached a career-high singles ranking of World No. 22 in the late 1980s and was runner-up in the 1988 mixed doubles at Wimbledon, former women's tennis coach at Trinity
- Chuck McKinley (B.S., mathematics, 1964) – tennis player at Trinity, later professional player and 1963 Wimbledon singles champion
- Bob Polk – head coach, men's basketball; led Tigers to 1968 NCAA Tourney
- Henry Schmidt (1958) – former NFL defensive lineman, San Francisco 49ers and San Diego Chargers (1959–1966)
- Anne Smith (B.A., psychology, 1993) – professional tennis player, numerous tennis Grand Slam doubles titles
- Dick Stockton (B.A., sociology, 1972) – professional tennis player, ranked as high as No. 8 tennis player in the 70s
- Marvin Upshaw (B.S., physical education, 1970) – former NFL defensive lineman, Cleveland Browns (1968–1969), Kansas City Chiefs (1970–1975), St. Louis Cardinals (1976)
- Jerheme Urban (B.A., social studies, 2003) – NFL wide receiver, Seattle Seahawks (2003–2006), Dallas Cowboys (2006–2007), Arizona Cardinals (2007–2009), Kansas City Chiefs (2010–2011); first Trinity alumnus to appear in a Super Bowl, current head football coach at Trinity
- Jeremy Wolf (B.A., communications, 2016) – American-Israeli baseball player on the Israel National Baseball Team

== Business ==
- Sardar Biglari (B.S., finance, 1999) – chairman and CEO of Biglari Holdings; Manager of the Lion Fund
- Daniel Lubetzky (B.A., international studies and economics, 1990) – CEO of KIND Healthy Snacks; founder of the PeaceWorks Foundation
- John Mackey – co-founder and CEO of Whole Foods Market
- Gavin Maloof (B.A., speech and communications, 1979) – co-owner of the Sacramento Kings
- David Prager (B.A., media studies and communications, 1979) – co-founder and vice-president of Revision3
- Alice Walton (B.S., business administration, 1971) – Forbes 400; daughter of Walmart founder Sam Walton
- Richard Yoo – co-founder and former CEO of Rackspace and ServerBeach

== Education ==
- Margaret A. Edwards – educator, librarian, and activist for the movement for young adult services, namesake for Margaret Edwards Award
- Jay Hartzell (B.S., economics, 1991) – president of the University of Texas at Austin, 2020–2025, current president at Southern Methodist University
- Herbert H. Reynolds (1952) – president of Baylor University, 1981–1995
- John Silber (B.A., philosophy, 1947) – chancellor and former president of Boston University; candidate for governor of Massachusetts in 1990
- Belle Wheelan – former Virginia Secretary of Education and president and CEO of Southern Association of Colleges and Schools‘ Commission on Colleges

== Government and military ==
- Suleiman Jasir Al-Herbish (M.A., economics) – director of the OPEC Fund for International Development, 2003–2018
- Alan Albright (B.A. 1981) – judge of the United States District Court for the Western District of Texas
- Oscar K. Allen – 42nd governor of Louisiana, 1932–1936
- Nancy E. Brasel (B.A. 1991) – judge of the United States District Court for the District of Minnesota
- Russell Budd (B.A.) – trial lawyer, Democratic Party fund-raiser
- William C. Chase (M.A., History) – major general, US Army
- John Cornyn (B.A., print journalism, 1973) – United States senator from Texas
- Charles R. Eskridge III (B.S. 1985) – judge of the United States District Court for the Southern District of Texas
- Dabney L. Friedrich (B.A. 1988) – judge of the United States District Court for the District of Columbia
- James T. Hill (B.A., political science, 1968) – general, U.S. Army & former commander, U.S. Southern Command
- Robert Holleyman (B.A., political science) – president and CEO of Business Software Alliance, former deputy US trade ambassador at Office of the United States Trade Representative
- Joe M. Kilgore – former U.S. representative from Texas, attended Trinity in the mid-1930s
- Gregory Luna (B.A., Math) – former Democratic member of the Texas House of Representatives and the Texas Senate
- Michael McCaul (B.A., business administration and history, 1984) – representative for Texas U.S. House District 10
- Mac McCutcheon (B.A., Criminal Justice Administration) – speaker and member of the Alabama House of Representatives
- Matt Mead (B.A, radio and television, 1984) – governor of the state of Wyoming
- Dan Morales (B.A, political science, 1978) – former attorney general of Texas
- Lisette M. Mondello – former assistant secretary of Public and Intergovernmental Affairs in the United States Department of Veterans Affairs
- Ron Nirenberg (B.A, communications, 1999) – former mayor of San Antonio, Texas (2017-2025)
- James Robertson Nowlin (B.A. 1959, M.A. 1962) – judge of the United States District Court for the Western District of Texas
- Brad Parscale (B.S, international business, finance, macroeconomics, 1999) – campaign manager for Donald Trump presidential campaign, 2020
- William K. Suter (B.A., sociology 1959) – clerk of the United States Supreme Court; former major general in the United States Army
- Erik Walsh (B.A., political science, 1991; M.S., Urban Administration, 1994) — city manager of San Antonio, Texas
- Henry T. Waskow (B.A., history, 1939) – US Army officer in World War II
- Susan Weddington – former chairman, Republican Party of Texas

== Other ==
- Michael Joseph Boulette (M.A., psychology) – auxiliary bishop of the Archdiocese of San Antonio
- John Hagee (B.S., History, 1964) – Evangelical Christian leader and author
- Pableaux Johnson – writer, photographer, filmmaker, cook, and designer focused on New Orleans, food, and drinks
- Mike Opelka – radio broadcaster and television producer
- Uma Pemmaraju (B.A., political science, 1980) – Fox News journalist
- William Rick Singer – CEO of Key International Freedom, mastermind of 2019 college admissions bribery scandal
- Robert S. (Bobby) Wolff – bridge player; only player to win world championship in all formats of the game; won more than thirty North American championships; served as president of World Bridge Federation and president of American contract bridge league (ACBL)

== Notable faculty ==
- William L. Breit (Economics) – E.M. Stevens Distinguished Professor of Economics, mystery novelist, comedian
- Rachel Caroline Eaton (Admin) – dean of women
- Gary R. Kates (History) – professor
- David W. Lesch (History) – Middle East History
- Char Miller (History, Urban Environment) – professor, chair of the History Department, director of Urban Studies
- Andrew Porter (English) – professor
- Norman Sherry (English) – Mitchell Professor of Literature
