= North Walton Doctors Hospital =

Geography
- Location: 4413 United States Highway 331 South Defuniak Springs, FL 32435, Florida
- Coordinates: 30°39′35.8128″N 86°7′3.4968″W

Organisation
- Type: Short Term Acute Care

Services
- Beds: 50

Helipads
- Helipad: No

History
- Former name: Healthmark Regional Medical Center

North Walton Doctors Hospital is a hospital in DeFuniak Springs, Florida.

HRMC specialized in short-term acute care.

It had 44 routine services beds and 6 special care beds.
