= Community Health Systems =

U.S. healthcare company

Community Health Systems, Inc.

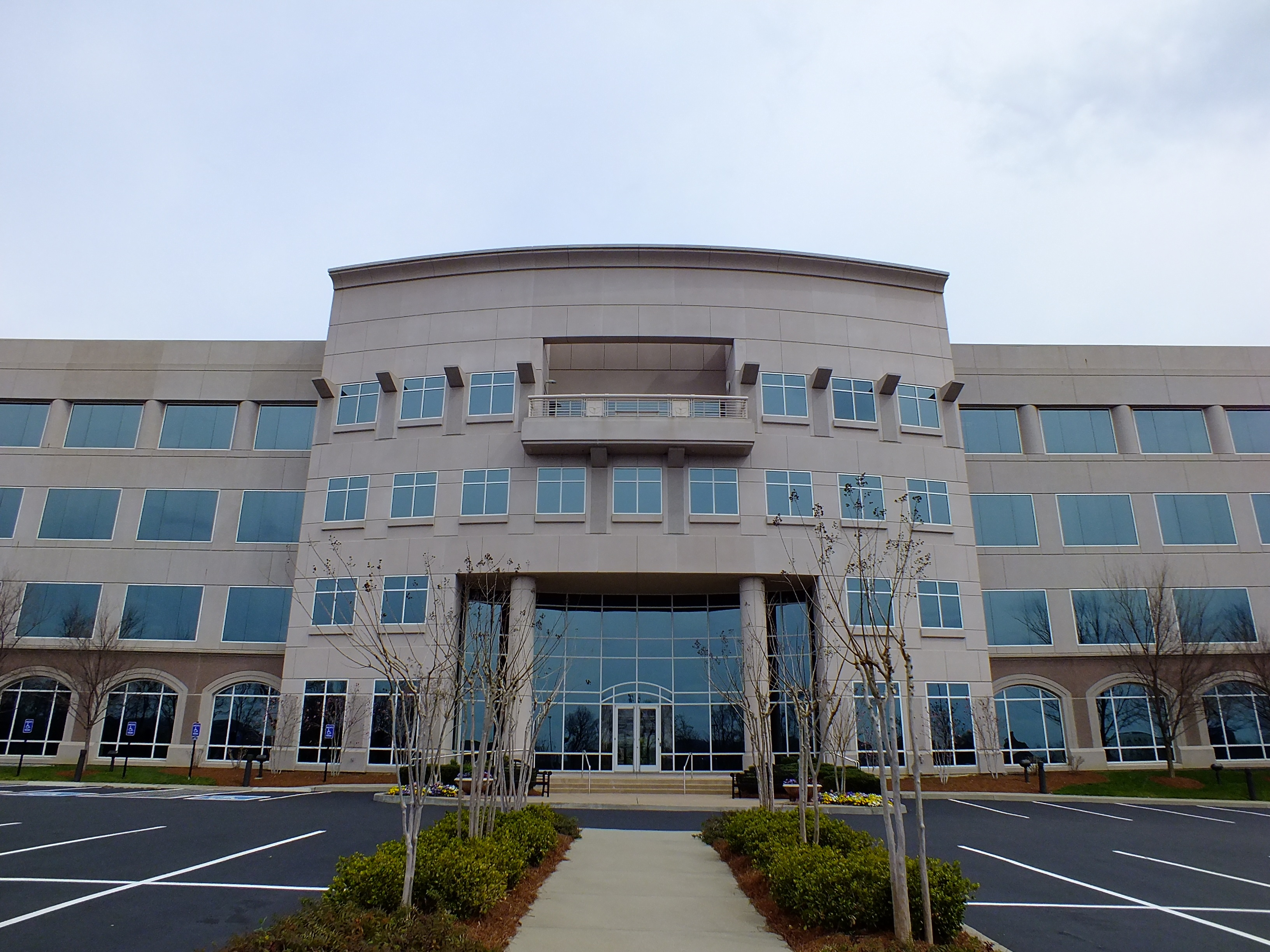
- Community Health Systems' headquarters in Franklin, Tennessee
- Type: Public
- Traded as: NYSE: CYH
- Industry: Health care
- Founded: 1985; 41 years ago
- Founders: Richard Ragsdale; David Steffy
- Headquarters: Franklin, Tennessee, U.S.
- Key people: Wayne T. Smith (chairman); Tim Hingtgen (CEO); Kevin Hammons (CFO)
- Revenue: ▲$12.490 billion (2023)
- Operating income: ▲$957 million (2023)
- Net income: ▼$(133 million) (2023)
- Total assets: ▼$14.4 billion (2023)
- Total equity: ▼$(1.392 billion) (2023)
- Number of employees: 61,000
- Website: http://www.chs.net/

Community Health Systems, Inc. (CHS) is an American Fortune 500 company based in Franklin, Tennessee, United States. It was the largest provider of general hospital healthcare services in the United States in terms of number of acute care facilities. In 2014, CHS had around 200 hospitals, but the number had declined to around 85 in 2021.

In August 2015, the company announced plans to spin off 38 hospitals and its management and consulting subsidiary, Quorum Health Resources, into a new publicly traded company called Quorum Health Corporation. The company completed the spinoff of Quorum Health Corporation on April 29, 2016. Quorum owns or leases hospitals across 16 states, primarily in cities or counties with populations of 50,000 or less. In April 2020 Quorum declared bankruptcy and is no longer trading on the NYSE.

On October 3, 2016, CHS was removed from the S&P Midcap 400 and added to the S&P Smallcap 600. Under CEO Wayne T. Smith, the company's stock has lost over 76% of its value since the year 2000.

Chinese billionaire Tianqiao Chen had a 22.2 percent stake in Community Health Systems in 2017.

== History ==
=== Founding and early years (1985–2014) ===
E. Thomas Chaney, former executive of Hospital Affiliates, Inc. and David Steffy and Richard Ragsdale, former executives at Hospital Corporation of America spinoff Republic Health Corporation, formed Community Health Systems in 1985.

The company made its initial public offering in 1991. In 1996, the company was purchased by private equity firm Forstmann Little & Company. Community Health Systems went public again in 2000. In August 2003, the company acquired Southside Regional Medical Center. On October 10, 2015, the 372-bed Grandview Medical Center began operating in Birmingham, Alabama, replacing Trinity Medical Center.

In 2000, Community Health Systems paid $31 million to the United States Department of Justice to settle a review of its billing practices.

In 2007, Community Health Systems purchased Plano, Texas-based Triad Hospitals for $6.8 billion, adding nearly 50 hospitals, hospital management and consulting business Quorum Health Resources, and nearly doubling the size of the company. Among the facilities included in the deal was McKenzie-Willamette Hospital in Springfield, Oregon; Trinity Medical Center in Birmingham, Alabama; and the seven hospitals of Lutheran Health Network in the Ft. Wayne, Indiana region.

In 2010, McKenzie-Willamette's healthcare workers' union, SEIU, Local 49, claimed that workload increases, slashed benefits, and staff reductions had lowered the quality of both patient care and quality of life for employees. The union, in its "Profits Before Community" campaign against the hospital, continues to highlight that profits have tripled while charitable care and employee benefits have steadily decreased since the hospital moved from a non-profit to a for-profit enterprise under CHS.

In 2011, it was accused by Tenet Healthcare of overbilling Medicare in its aggressive admissions policy compared to its peers. It was subpoenaed by Medicare on its aggressive billing to the Medicare systems.

In 2013, Community Health Systems entered into an agreement with Health Management Associates to purchase HMA for about $3.6 billion in cash and stock. The merger was completed in January 2014 and made Community Health Systems the largest for-profit hospital operator at the time, with 206 hospitals in 29 states. The acquisition of HMA brought with it liability for lawsuits and criminal charges of fraudulent claims against Medicare and other federal programs. CHS settled these claims for $262 million in October, 2018.

On August 4, 2014, Community Health Systems paid $95.14 million to the United States Department of Justice to resolve multiple lawsuits "alleging that the company knowingly billed government health care programs for inpatient services that should have been billed as outpatient or observation services". As part of the agreement, Community Health Systems was required to enter into a corporate integrity agreement that required the company to participate in compliance efforts.

It was reported on August 18, 2014, that hackers broke into Community Health System's records system and stole data on 4.5 million patients. These data included names, Social Security numbers, physical addresses, birthdays and telephone numbers. CHS provided all patients whose records were impacted with free identity theft protection.

=== Recent developments (2015–present) ===
On February 2, 2015, Community Health Systems was required to pay $75 million to settle allegations "that they made illegal donations to county governments to reap more federal dollars under a now-discontinued matching program". The allegations were brought about by a former CHS employee in a complaint under the False Claims Act.

In October 2015, Community Health Systems paid $13 million to the United States Department of Justice to resolve allegations related to the False Claims Act.

After CHS agreed in 2015 to sell Memorial Hospital of Salem County in New Jersey to Prime Healthcare Foundation, a nonprofit affiliated with Prime Healthcare Services; the sale was approved by New Jersey in early February 2017.

On December 6, 2016, a former CFO of a CHS hospital was awarded $1.9 million in a whistleblower lawsuit he filed after he was terminated for refusing to submit false financial documents.

In January 2017, a settlement between investors and CHS executives for $60 million was reached. The settlement resolved allegations of "breach of fiduciary duty" by CHS executives.

In March 2017, Quorum's board retained outside counsel in relation to whether Community Health Systems had committed fraud with regards to financial projections for Quorum, and whether any of its current management may have been involved in any possible fraud. In June 2017 Quorum said although the investigation did not produce "conclusive evidence" of fraud the projections appeared to be incompetent at best.

In April–July 2017, Community Health Systems rejected overtures from key Lutheran Health Network doctors to facilitate sale of its profitable network in CHS to a third party, after assertions of continual lack of re-investment into the network's facilities and staff by CHS management. After those discussions/accusations became public, several key leaders of the affiliated hospitals, Lutheran and Dupont, and the network were fired or resigned. Key prominent local community leaders Chuck Surack and Tom Kelley resigned from the Lutheran Health Network's and hospitals' advisory boards.

On March 13, 2018, it was reported that the company had hired financial advisory firm Lazard to help address long-term debt.

On August 1, 2018, CHS completed the sale of 425-bed Munroe Regional Medical Center in Ocala, Fla., to Altamonte Springs, Fla.-based Adventist Health System.

On May 22, 2019, AdventHealth announced they had signed definitive agreements to purchase 193-bed Heart of Florida Regional Medical Center in Davenport, Florida, and 160-bed Lake Wales Medical Center in Lake Wales, Florida, from affiliates of CHS.

In December 2019, CHS announced that subsidiaries of the company have completed the sale of three Virginia hospitals – Southside Regional Medical Center in Petersburg, Southampton Memorial Hospital in Franklin, and Southern Virginia Regional Medical Center in Emporia, effective on January 1, 2020.

On April 27, 2020, CHS announced that an affiliate of the company has signed a definitive agreement to sell its majority ownership interest in 84‑bed St. Cloud Regional Medical Center and its associated healthcare operations in St. Cloud, Florida, to a subsidiary of Orlando Health. Orlando Health currently holds minority ownership interest in St. Cloud and will purchase the remaining interest through this transaction.

On September 30, 2020, CHS announced that an affiliate of the company has completed the sale of 480-bed Bayfront Health St. Petersburg and its associated assets to a subsidiary of Orlando Health.

In its annual Form 10-K filed in 2019, it identified Florida, Texas and Indiana as areas of geographic concentration.

In 2014, CHS had around 200 hospitals, but the number had declined to around 85 in 2021.

From March 2020 to May 2021, during the COVID-19 pandemic, CHS filed more than 19,000 lawsuits against individuals for not being able to pay off their medical debt (some from hospitals it no longer owned) even as the company collected over $700 million in Covid relief funds from the federal government. Many of these lawsuits were against people who could not pay the legal fees to challenge CHS in court. (Due to the fact that these are civil suits and not criminal suits, the defendants do not receive a state-appointed lawyer.) In 2020, CHS posted its most profitable year in at least a decade.

=== Predatory liens practices ===
Lawsuits have been filed against CHS hospitals for alleged predatory liens practices where hospitals file for liens rather than bill individuals' health insurers, resulting in massive fees for patients.
