= Health Management Associates (Florida company) =

- Type: Public
- Defunct: 2014
- Fate: Acquired by Community Health Systems
- Headquarters: North Naples, Florida, United States

Health Management Associates was a for-profit corporation which operated hospitals and other health care facilities in the southern United States. It was headquartered at 5811 Pelican Bay Blvd. in North Naples, Florida.

== Background ==
Health Management Associates (HMA) was an organization that provided people, processes, capital, and subject matter expertise to hospitals and physician practices per their individual needs or governing requirements. Additional functions that HMA provides to hospitals and provider groups are to invest capital for renewal of hospital facilities, recruiting of physicians to expand community resources or hospital services, and promote the use standardized best practices throughout HMA facilities.

In 2010, they purchased the former Wuesthoff Healthcare hospitals, headquartered in Rockledge, Florida for $145 million.

Community Health Systems entered into an agreement with HMA in 2013 to purchase HMA for about $3.6 billion in cash and stock. The merger made Community Health Systems the largest for-profit hospital operator (ranked by the number of hospitals) in the United States.

Before its 2014 acquisition, HMA provided services to 71 hospitals for an approximate 11,000 licensed beds throughout 15 states. 42,000 individuals in clinical and support roles enables HMA the ability to provide 3.5 million patient interactions yearly throughout their organization.

== 2012 Allegations of Medicare Fraud ==
In 2012, the CBS show, "60 Minutes," interviewed over 100 former employees of HMA. These former employees criticized HMA of implementing unethical for-profit measures. They alleged that HMA has established hospital admission goals of 20% or higher that their physicians must adhere to, or face termination. The former employees said that these goals had resulted in an admission of more than 50% of patients aged 65 or over, regardless of medical need. Paul Meyers, HMA's former director of compliance and a 30-year FBI veteran, accused the chain of Medicare fraud. The hospital chain is being investigated by the US Justice Department, Kroft added, which has subpoenaed records pertaining to emergency-room management and a software program used by ER doctors.

== 2014 Allegations of attempt to inflate bills ==
In 2014, The New York Times reported that the Justice Department had joined eight separate whistle-blower lawsuits against HMA in six states. The lawsuits alleged a wide-ranging strategy that attempted to inflate HMA's payments from Medicare and Medicaid by increasing hospital admissions. The Justice Department accused HMA of admitting patients to hospitals regardless of whether they needed hospital care and pressuring doctors to admit patients to the hospital. Page Vaughan, who is accused of pressuring doctors to wrongfully admit is working at a small rural hospital in Chester, South Carolina as of 2014.
