= AdventHealth Daytona Beach =

- AdventHealth

Geography
- Location: 301 Memorial Medical Parkway, Daytona Beach, Florida, United States
- Coordinates: 29.2431°N 81.1076°W

Organization
- Care system: Private hospital
- Type: General hospital
- Religious affiliation: Seventh-day Adventist Church

Services
- Standards: Joint Commission
- Emergency department: Yes
- Beds: 466

Helipads
- Helipad: Aeronautical chart and airport information for 4FL6 at SkyVector

History
- Former names: Ormond Beach Memorial Hospital; Florida Hospital Ormond Memorial; Florida Hospital Memorial Medical Center
- Opened: May 1, 1967 and July 14, 2009

Links
- Website: www.adventhealth.com/hospital/adventhealth-daytona-beach
- Lists: Hospitals in Florida

Memorial Health Systems, Inc. (doing business as AdventHealth Daytona Beach) is a non-profit hospital campus in Daytona Beach, Florida, United States. It became part of AdventHealth following a merger with Memorial Health Systems in May 2000. The medical facility is a tertiary and comprehensive stroke center that has multiple specialties. In 2009, the hospital moved to its current location from Ormond Beach, Florida. In 2019, the 10th 'Timmy's Playroom' opened at the hospital. In 2023, a mercy killing took place at AdventHealth Daytona Beach, between an elderly couple.

== History ==
=== 1961-2009 ===
In 1961, city commissioner John B. Sterthaus donated 15 acres (6.1 ha) for a hospital, in honor of Ormond Beach, Florida and his son, Sgt. George J. Sterthaus, who was killed during World War II. On April 23, 1967, five thousand people attended a dedication ceremony for Ormond Beach Memorial Hospital, including mayor Ernest Cassen, attorney Melvin Orfinger and American Legion Post 267. On May 1, Ormond Beach Memorial Hospital opened with four stories. In 1980, the hospital's first open heart surgery took place.

In late May 2000, Memorial Health Systems chose to merge with Adventist Health System. It had to be approved by both of the hospital networks boards, and by regulators from Florida and the federal government. In early October 2005, Halifax Medical Center signed an agreement with Florida Hospital, allowing it to build a new hospital only ten minutes away in Daytona Beach, Florida effectively ending a two-year turf war. In 2006, Florida Hospital Ormond Memorial was put up for sale, that year it was appraised at $34.3 million. In 2008, the sale price for the hospital was $16 million.

On July 14, 2009, 100 patients were moved from Florida Hospital Ormond Memorial in Ormond Beach to Florida Hospital Memorial Medical Center in Daytona Beach. The 12-story, 718,000 square foot (66,700 m^{2}) Florida Hospital Memorial Medical Center cost $270 million to build, it opened with 277 beds and 32 of them being for a birthcare center. The hospital was built on 135 acres next to Interstate 95. After moving to Daytona Beach the hospital doubled its size, when it was in Ormond Beach it was only 330,000 square foot (31,000 m^{2}) and its seven-story tower had 205 beds. The reason why the hospital chose to move to Daytona Beach was because it wanted to be closer to Interstate 95 for visibility purposes, since its former location was in a wooded area.

=== 2010-2019 ===
In October 2010, a Cancer Institute opened on the campus of Florida Hospital Memorial Medical Center. In December, a Volusia County circuit court judge ruled against descendants of John B. Sterthaus who had sued Adventist Health System, they claimed that the property could only be used for a hospital. The reason for the decision was that the deed restriction had expired when the donor died. In 2011, Florida Hospital Ormond Memorial was reappraised at $3.9 million, while the sale price also was lowered to $8.9 million. Florida Hospital was still using fifty-seven percent of Florida Hospital Ormond Memorial for storage in 2011, the rest of the property they were required to pay property taxes on. Juan Yang from Beijing wanted the property in 2011, for a nursing home or other health care use.

On July 22, 2012, Florida Hospital Ormond Memorial was demolished at 7:30 a.m. with 150 sticks of dynamite Eighty-five percent of the hospital was recycled. The reason for hospital being demolished was due to the bad economy, a buyer could not be found for it. The city mayor hoped that it could have been used as a veterans' hospital or assisted living facility. On January 4, 2013, Florida Hospital sold the 27.6 acres (11.2 ha) that Florida Hospital Ormond Memorial had been on for $2 million to Buddy LaCour and investors. On the acres a clubhouse, health club and 280 condominium units are to be built.

In early December 2012, Kangaroo Express donated $110,000 to Florida Hospital Pink Army for its fight against breast cancer. Florida Hospital Memorial Medical Center received about $24,000 of that money donated.

In late May 2014, Florida Hospital Memorial Medical Center announced that it would be expanding onto its vacant eleventh floor. It will have a thirty-four bed long-term acute care facility, the facility will be operated by Select Medical Corporation from Mechanicsburg, Pennsylvania. It was approved by the Government of Florida in March, the construction cost of the unit would be $7.2 million and it would open in the summer. In 2014, construction workers built the Center for Health and Wellness on campus. After completion it offered cardiac rehabilitation and diabetes education. In 2015, it received a 6,500 square foot (600 m^{2}) expansion that doubled its size at a cost of $1.3 million. After expansion was completed at the Center for Health and Wellness in early January 2016, it added a daycare and a health club with such class as spin and yoga.

In late September 2015, Florida Hospital Memorial Medical Center was expanding by 16,300 square foot (1,510 m^{2}) on the fourth floor. They were doing this for a new $10 million neonatal intensive care unit, to keep parents with their babies who were born prematurely or with complications. In August 2016, the neonatal intensive care unit opened with 16 beds. And work continued in September, for another $10 million, to add 34 private beds for women and children in the pediatric intensive care unit. On May 11, 2017, the Center for Women and Children opened, increasing the number of beds from 293 to 327. On June 29, Jamie McMurray helped to dedicate the inpatient pediatric playroom which has murals of racecars on its walls.

On January 2, 2019, Florida Hospital Memorial Medical Center rebranded to AdventHealth Daytona Beach. In late May, it was announced that a Timmy's Playroom would be added to the fourth floor of AdventHealth Daytona Beach. Making it the very first hospital in the hospital network to be chosen. On July 30, the Tim Tebow Foundation opened its 10th playroom at AdventHealth Daytona Beach.

=== 2020-present ===
On December 21, 2020, frontline workers at AdventHealth Daytona Beach received the Pfizer-BioNTech COVID-19 vaccine. On January 1, 2021, all hospitals were required to have their chargemaster on its website by the Centers for Medicare & Medicaid Services. In early February 2023, almost all of the AdventHealth hospitals had their chargemaster on their website, including AdventHealth Daytona Beach.

On February 1, 2023, construction workers began building a $45.7 million three story 60,000 square foot (5,600 m^{2}) medical office building/ambulatory surgery center on the campus of AdventHealth Daytona Beach. On the first floor the AdventHealth Medical Group will have a cardiac rehabilitation clinic and the North Florida Surgeons will have a surgical clinic. On the second floor the Cardiology Physicians Group will have a cardiology clinic. On the third floor there will be the ambulatory surgery center that will be used by all three groups and by independent physicians. The ambulatory surgery center will have four operating theaters and two catheterization laboratories for physicians to use. The building is a joint venture between the hospital and Meadows & Ohly. In late November, the building was topped off. On April 11, 2024, AdventHealth Daytona Beach had a grand opening of AdventHealth Surgery Center and Medical Office Building.

On April 24, 2024, AdventHealth Daytona Beach announced a construction project to expand the hospital by 240,000 square foot (22,000 m^{2}) at a cost of $220 million. Its two towers will be getting taller, one will have four stories added and the other will have just one story added. The hospital would be adding 104 beds to its facility, this would increase the number of beds from 362 to 466. It will also would be expanding its sterile processing department, its neurological intensive care unit and its coronary care unit. A new pharmacy and laboratory will be built, and the number of operating theaters will increase from eighteen to twenty-two; it would also be purchasing new CT scanners and MRI scanners. On July 22, Robins & Morton began construction on the smaller tower and work on the larger tower began a few weeks later. HuntonBrady Architects designed there expansion. To celebrate the event a Japanese blueberry tree was planted on the campus of AdventHealth Daytona Beach.

On April 7, 2025, there was a topping out of the larger tower. The larger tower has shell space to add another 104 beds in the future and a 287 parking lot was being added on the southside of the hospital campus. On August 21, 2026, construction at AdventHealth Daytona Beach was completed, and five days later the hospital had a grand opening. The reason why the hospital expanded was due to the rapid growth of Volusia County, Florida.

== Crimes ==
=== Mercy killing ===
On January 21, 2023, Ellen Gilland of New Smyrna Beach, Florida, fatally shot her terminally ill husband Jerry Gilland in the head. After a four-hour standoff with SWAT and hostage negotiation teams from the Daytona Beach Police Department, they took her into custody. During the standoff, AdventHealth Daytona Beach employees evacuated patients on the eleventh floor close to the shooting. Ellen Gilland was later charged with first-degree murder and three counts of aggravated assault. In late February, a grand jury found her guilty on lesser charges of assisting self-murder/manslaughter. They agreed with the two counts of aggravated assault with a firearm and aggravated assault of a police officer. In early March, Ellen Gilland was released from the Volusia County Jail on a $150,000 bail bond.

On December 31, 2024, she pleaded no contest for killing her husband. If Gilland had not pleaded no contest she could have received thirty years in prison, by pleading no contest it cancelled a trial set for January 6, 2025. On February 28, Volusia County judge Kathryn Weston sentenced Ellen Gilland to 366 days in state prison and twelve years of probation. The judge told her that she would have to serve eight hours of community service every month and write letters of apology to police officers and the hospital staff who she scared.

=== Shooting of police officer ===
On September 21, 2026, Michael Hightower was taken to AdventHealth Daytona Beach after he had purposely crashed his car into an elderly couples motor vehicle at Daytona State College. While going through an MRI the suspect grabbed the gun of K-9 officer Austin Long of the Ormond Beach Police Department and shot him in the leg. Hightower was charged with attempted first-degree murder of a police officer, two counts of battery and assault of a police officer, resisting an officer with violence; and two counts of attempted felony murder of the elderly couple. On September 22, Volusia County judge Hunter Morrill denied his bail bond, Hightower faces life in prison.

== Services ==
In July 2018, construction workers began to renovate administration offices for a 32-bed rehabilitation center. On January 2, 2019, the rehabilitation center opened on its own floor. Before opening it operated temporary on the fourth and ninth floors of AdventHealth Daytona Beach. It offers physical therapy, speech therapy and occupational therapy. Before coming to Daytona Beach the rehabilition center had been at Florida Hospital Oceanside.

In late February 2025, the hospital became the second location for the SherryStrong Integrative Wellness Center, which offers cancer therapy for free. The NASCAR Foundation and the Martin Truex Jr. Foundation both gave money for the SherryStrong Integrative Wellness Center.

== Charity giving ==
In early August 2017, Florida Hospital Memorial Medical Center donated stationery and medical supplies to the Jewish Federation of Volusia and Flagler County.

== Partnership ==
In early January 2014, Florida Hospital Memorial Medical Center partnered with Bethune-Cookman University, to help Daytona Beach residents manage their diabetes or heart disease, with a program named Florida Hospital Community Care.

== Awards and recognitions ==
=== The Leapfrog Group ===
The hospital received a grade A from The Leapfrog Group from June 2012 to May 2024, in November it was given a grade B. It received a grade B twice in 2026. AdventHealth Daytona Beach was recognized by the non-profit organization as a top general hospital from 2021 to 2023.

=== Consumer Reports ===
In 2012, Florida Hospital Memorial Medical Center was recognized by Consumer Reports as the safest hospital in Florida with a score of 72, and again it was recognized by the non-profit organization in 2013, as the safest in the state with a score of 59.

=== Centers for Medicare & Services ===
The medical facility received from the Centers for Medicare & Medicaid Services a five-star rating from 2021 to 2024. And received it again in 2026.

=== U.S. News & World Report ===
In 2022, AdventHealth Daytona Beach was recognized by U.S. News & World Report as being one of six hospitals tied at eighteenth for being the best in Florida. In late July 2025, the news magazine recognized the medical facility as the best hospital in the Deltona-Daytona Beach-Ormond Beach metropolitan area.

=== Forbes ===
On December 4, the hospital was recognized by Forbes in its new Top Hospitals list with a five-star ranking.

== See also ==
- List of Seventh-day Adventist hospitals
- List of stroke centers in the United States
