= Atlantic Medical Center-Daytona =

- Halifax Health

Geography
- Location: 400 N. Clyde Morris Boulevard, Daytona Beach, Florida, United States

Organization
- Care system: Private hospital
- Type: General hospital

Services
- Beds: 214

History
- Former names: Daytona Community Hospital; Humana Hospital-Daytona Beach; Daytona Medical Center; Columbia Medical Center-Daytona
- Construction started: 1974
- Closed: May 2013
- Demolished: 2013

Links
- Lists: Hospitals in Florida

Atlantic Medical Center-Daytona was a hospital in Daytona Beach, Florida, United States. It was demolished in 2013.

== History ==
In 1974, Humana had Daytona Community Hospital built. In 1984, it was rebranded as Humana Hospital-Daytona Beach.

In late July 1992, Champion Healthcare Corp. from Houston started the process to purchase Humana Hospital-Daytona Beach, Humana Hospital-Pasco and Human Hospital-Sebastian from Humana, but by early November they changed their mind about purchasing them. On March 1, 1993, Humana spun off its hospitals creating the hospital network Galen Health Care. Then Humana Hospital-Daytona Beach was renamed Daytona Medical Center. On September 1, 1993, Columbia Hospital Corporation purchased Galen Health Care for $3.5 billion. After the merger the hospital network changed its name to Columbia Healthcare Corporation. In 1996, Daytona Medical Center was renamed Columbia Medical Center-Daytona. In 1998, Columbia Medical Center-Daytona was renamed Atlantic Medical Center-Daytona.

In early May 1999, Halifax Medical Center wanted to purchase both Atlantic Medical Center-Daytona and Atlantic Medical Center-Ormond Beach from Columbia/HCA Healthcare Corporation for $28 million. But they changed their mind after Memorial Health Systems Inc. complained to the Florida Attorney General and the Federal government of the United States. In early November, it purchased only Atlantic Medical Center-Daytona from Columbia/HCA Healthcare Corporation for $14 million.

In 2012, Halifax Health had put Atlantic Medical Center-Daytona up for sale at $5 million, but it could not find a buyer for the four-story hospital. In early May, the hospital network had decided to have the hospital demolished. The reasons why they wanted to demolish Atlantic Medical Center-Daytona, was because the hospital was very outdated, and that it would cost $13.5 million to renovate the interior and fix the exterior. In late May 2013, construction workers began demolishing the 120,000-square-foot Atlantic Medical Center-Daytona. The city rezoned the 93 acres for other uses.
