= 2015 Daytona 500 =

Auto race held in 2015

Race details
- Race 1 of 36 in the 2015 NASCAR Sprint Cup Series
- Date: February 22, 2015
- Location: Daytona International Speedway in Daytona Beach, Florida
- Course: Permanent racing facility 2.5 mi (4 km)
- Distance: 203 laps, 507.5 mi (812 km)
- Scheduled distance: 200 laps, 500 mi (800 km)
- Weather: Sunny skies with a temperature of 79 °F (26 °C); wind out of the south/southeast at 9.2 mph (14.8 km/h)
- Average speed: 161.938 mph (260.614 km/h)

Pole position
| Driver | Jeff Gordon (W) | Hendrick Motorsports |
- Time: 44.711

Qualifying race winners
| Duel 1 Winner | Dale Earnhardt Jr. (W) | Hendrick Motorsports |
| Duel 2 Winner | Jimmie Johnson (W) | Hendrick Motorsports |

Most laps led
| Driver | Jeff Gordon (W) | Hendrick Motorsports |
- Laps: 87

Winner
| No. 22 | Joey Logano | Team Penske |

Television in the United States
- Network: Fox
- Announcers: Mike Joy, Larry McReynolds and Darrell Waltrip
- Nielsen ratings: 7.3/16 (Overnight); 7.7/17 (Final); 13.4 Million viewers

Radio in the United States
- Radio: MRN
- Booth announcers: Joe Moore, Jeff Striegle and Rusty Wallace
- Turn announcers: Dave Moody (1 & 2), Mike Bagley (Backstretch) and Kyle Rickey (3 & 4)

The 2015 Daytona 500, the 57th running of the event, was a NASCAR Sprint Cup Series race which was held on February 22, 2015 at Daytona International Speedway in Daytona Beach, Florida. Contested over 203 laps – extended from 200 laps due to a green–white–checker finish – on the 2.5 mi (4.0 km) asphalt superspeedway, it was the first race of the 2015 NASCAR Sprint Cup Series season. Joey Logano won the race, recording the second Daytona 500 win for Team Penske, and his ninth career Sprint Cup victory. Kevin Harvick finished second while Dale Earnhardt Jr., Denny Hamlin and Jimmie Johnson rounded out the top–five.

Jeff Gordon won the pole for his 23rd and final career start in the Daytona 500. Hendrick Motorsports swept the Budweiser Duel races with Earnhardt Jr. winning the first Duel race and fourth career qualifying race and Johnson winning the second Duel race and second career qualifying race. Gordon led a race-high 87 laps and ran up front for most of the race. He was caught up in the backstretch multi-car wreck on the final lap of the race and finished 33rd. Logano took the lead with 10 laps to go in the scheduled 200 lap distance and was ahead of Kevin Harvick before the last caution flag ended the race in his favor. The race had 27 lead changes among 12 different drivers, as well as 7 caution flag periods for 26 laps. There was also a single red flag period that lasted for 6 minutes and 42 seconds.

Logano left Daytona with a five-point lead over Harvick in the points standings, while Ford left Daytona with a five-point lead over Chevrolet in the manufacturer standings.

The 57th Daytona 500 was carried by Fox Sports on the broadcast Fox network for the American television audience. The radio broadcast for the race was carried by the Motor Racing Network and Sirius XM NASCAR Radio.

Brothers Kurt Busch and Kyle Busch, mainstays in the Cup Series for over a decade, both missed the race for different reasons, making this event the first race without one of the two since the 2001 NAPA 500. Kurt missed the race after being suspended during a trial for domestic violence, while Kyle suffered a broken right leg and a fractured left foot in a violent crash in the Alert Today Florida 300 the day prior.

This marks the final Daytona 500 starts for Sam Hornish Jr., Tony Stewart, and Johnny Sauter and the only for then two-time NASCAR Truck Series champion Matt Crafton.

== Report ==
=== Background ===
Daytona International Speedway, where the race was held. The front stretch is at the bottom of the picture.

Daytona International Speedway is a race track in Daytona Beach, Florida, United States. Since opening in 1959, it has been the home of the Daytona 500, the most prestigious race in NASCAR. In addition to NASCAR, the track also hosts races of ARCA, AMA Superbike, USCC, SCCA, and Motocross. The track features multiple layouts including the primary 2.5 mi (4.0 km) high speed tri-oval, a 3.56 mi (5.73 km) sports car course, a 2.95 mi (4.75 km) motorcycle course, and a .25 mi (0.40 km) karting and motorcycle flat-track. The track's 180-acre (73 ha) infield includes the 29-acre (12 ha) Lake Lloyd, which has hosted powerboat racing. The speedway is owned and operated by International Speedway Corporation.

The track was built to host racing that was being held by NASCAR founder Bill France Sr. at the former Daytona Beach and Road Course and opened with the first Daytona 500 in 1959. The speedway has been renovated three times, with the infield renovated in 2004, and the track repaved in 1978 and 2010.

==== New rules ====
NASCAR implemented a new camera system to officiate pit road. Forty-five cameras monitor pit road and reduce the number of necessary officials on pit road from 24 to 10. The system was beta tested during the 10 race Chase for the Sprint Cup last season and "allegedly" detected a high number of infractions such as driving through more than three stalls to get into or exit one's pit stall. Eight officials monitor the system from a truck outside the track and have the final say on imposing a penalty. With only 10 officials monitoring pit road now, NASCAR no longer penalizes teams for missing or loose lug nuts. The responsibility for having those lug nuts on the car falls on the teams.

==== Entry list ====
The program for the 2015 Daytona 500, featuring Dale Earnhardt Jr.'s victory during the 2014 Daytona 500.

The entry list for the 57th running of the Daytona 500 was released on Thursday, February 12, 2015 at 9:22 a.m. Eastern time. Fifty drivers were entered for the race. Joe Nemechek and his No. 87 team later withdrew before qualifying after the team had problems preparing the car. With the Daytona 500 being the first race of the 2015 season, 13 drivers were entered for the race driving for a different team than they had raced for in the 2014 season. Trevor Bayne made his debut with Roush Fenway Racing after spending the last five seasons driving part-time for Wood Brothers Racing. Alex Bowman, who drove for BK Racing in his 2014 rookie campaign, moved to Tommy Baldwin Racing to drive the No. 7 Chevrolet. Sam Hornish Jr. returned to full time in the Sprint Cup Series – his first since 2010 – to drive in the No. 9 Richard Petty Motorsports Ford. He replaced Marcos Ambrose who returned to his native Australia to race in the V8 Supercar Series. Carl Edwards, who drove the last 11 seasons for Roush Fenway Racing, moved to Joe Gibbs Racing to drive the No. 19 Toyota. Ryan Blaney replaced Trevor Bayne in the No. 21 Wood Brothers Racing Ford on a part-time basis. J. J. Yeley moved to the No. 23 BK Racing Toyota that had been driven by Alex Bowman the previous season. Jeb Burton moved up from the Camping World Truck Series to drive the No. 26 BK Racing Toyota. Justin Marks was entered to make his first Sprint Cup Series start in the No. 29 RAB Racing Toyota. Former Camping World Truck Series champion Ron Hornaday Jr. moved up to attempt to run his first full season in the Sprint Cup Series since 2001 in the No. 30 Chevrolet for The Motorsports Group. The 2000 series champion Bobby Labonte took over the seat of the No. 32 Go FAS Racing Ford for the four restrictor plate races. This was a role previously done by his brother Terry Labonte who made his final career start in October 2014 at Talladega. Cole Whitt, who drove the No. 26 BK Racing Toyota in his 2014 rookie campaign, moved to the No. 35 Front Row Motorsports Ford. Reed Sorenson drove the No. 44 Team XTREME Racing Chevrolet. Michael Annett left Tommy Baldwin Racing after his 2014 rookie campaign and moved to HScott Motorsports to drive the No. 46 Chevrolet. Brian Scott was entered in a one race deal to drive the No. 62 Premium Motorsports Chevrolet.

| No. | Driver | Team | Manufacturer | Starts | Best Finish |
|---|---|---|---|---|---|
| 1 | Jamie McMurray (W) | Chip Ganassi Racing | Chevrolet | 12 | 1st |
| 2 | Brad Keselowski | Team Penske | Ford | 5 | 3rd |
| 3 | Austin Dillon | Richard Childress Racing | Chevrolet | 2 | 9th |
| 4 | Kevin Harvick (W) | Stewart–Haas Racing | Chevrolet | 13 | 1st |
| 5 | Kasey Kahne | Hendrick Motorsports | Chevrolet | 11 | 7th |
| 6 | Trevor Bayne (W) | Roush Fenway Racing | Ford | 4 | 1st |
| 7 | Alex Bowman | Tommy Baldwin Racing | Chevrolet | 1 | 23rd |
| 9 | Sam Hornish Jr. | Richard Petty Motorsports | Ford | 3 | 15th |
| 10 | Danica Patrick | Stewart–Haas Racing | Chevrolet | 3 | 8th |
| 11 | Denny Hamlin | Joe Gibbs Racing | Toyota | 9 | 2nd |
| 13 | Casey Mears | Germain Racing | Chevrolet | 10 | 2nd |
| 14 | Tony Stewart | Stewart–Haas Racing | Chevrolet | 16 | 2nd |
| 15 | Clint Bowyer | Michael Waltrip Racing | Toyota | 9 | 4th |
| 16 | Greg Biffle | Roush Fenway Racing | Ford | 12 | 3rd |
| 17 | Ricky Stenhouse Jr. | Roush Fenway Racing | Ford | 3 | 7th |
| 18 | Kyle Busch | Joe Gibbs Racing | Toyota | 10 | 4th |
| 19 | Carl Edwards | Joe Gibbs Racing | Toyota | 10 | 2nd |
| 20 | Matt Kenseth (W) | Joe Gibbs Racing | Ford | 15 | 1st |
| 21 | Ryan Blaney | Wood Brothers Racing | Ford | 0 | — |
| 22 | Joey Logano | Team Penske | Ford | 6 | 9th |
| 23 | J. J. Yeley | BK Racing | Toyota | 5 | 10th |
| 24 | Jeff Gordon (W) | Hendrick Motorsports | Chevrolet | 22 | 1st |
| 26 | Jeb Burton (R) | BK Racing | Toyota | 0 | — |
| 27 | Paul Menard | Richard Childress Racing | Chevrolet | 7 | 6th |
| 29 | Justin Marks | RAB Racing | Toyota | 0 | — |
| 30 | Ron Hornaday Jr. | The Motorsports Group | Chevrolet | 1 | 17th |
| 31 | Ryan Newman (W) | Richard Childress Racing | Chevrolet | 13 | 1st |
| 32 | Bobby Labonte | Go FAS Racing | Ford | 22 | 2nd |
| 33 | Ty Dillon | Hillman–Circle Sport | Chevrolet | 0 | — |
| 34 | David Ragan | Front Row Motorsports | Ford | 8 | 5th |
| 35 | Cole Whitt | Front Row Motorsports | Ford | 1 | 28th |
| 38 | David Gilliland | Front Row Motorsports | Ford | 5 | 3rd |
| 40 | Landon Cassill | Hillman–Circle Sport | Chevrolet | 2 | 12th |
| 41 | Kurt Busch | Stewart–Haas Racing | Chevrolet | 14 | 2nd |
| 42 | Kyle Larson | Chip Ganassi Racing | Chevrolet | 1 | 38th |
| 43 | Aric Almirola | Richard Petty Motorsports | Ford | 4 | 13th |
| 44 | Reed Sorenson | Team XTREME Racing | Chevrolet | 5 | 5th |
| 46 | Michael Annett | HScott Motorsports | Chevrolet | 1 | 37th |
| 47 | A. J. Allmendinger | JTG Daugherty Racing | Chevrolet | 5 | 3rd |
| 48 | Jimmie Johnson (W) | Hendrick Motorsports | Chevrolet | 13 | 1st |
| 51 | Justin Allgaier | HScott Motorsports | Chevrolet | 1 | 27th |
| 55 | Michael Waltrip (W) | Michael Waltrip Racing | Toyota | aa | 1st |
| 62 | Brian Scott | Premium Motorsports | Chevrolet | 1 | 25th |
| 66 | Mike Wallace | Premium Motorsports | Chevrolet | 10 | 4th |
| 78 | Martin Truex Jr. | Furniture Row Racing | Chevrolet | 10 | 6th |
| 83 | Johnny Sauter | BK Racing | Toyota | 2 | 16th |
| 87 | Joe Nemechek | NEMCO Motorsports | Chevrolet | 20 | 6th |
| 88 | Dale Earnhardt Jr. (W) | Hendrick Motorsports | Chevrolet | 15 | 1st |
| 95 | Michael McDowell | Leavine Family Racing | Ford | 4 | 9th |
| 98 | Josh Wise | Phil Parsons Racing | Ford | 2 | 24th |

| Key | Meaning |
|---|---|
| (R) | Rookie |
| (W) | Past winner |

== Practice ==
=== First practice (February 14) ===
Ricky Stenhouse Jr. was the fastest in the first practice session with a time of 44.413 and a speed of 202.643 mph (326.122 km/h).

| Pos | No. | Driver | Team | Manufacturer | Time | Speed |
|---|---|---|---|---|---|---|
| 1 | 17 | Ricky Stenhouse Jr. | Roush Fenway Racing | Ford | 44.413 | 202.643 |
| 2 | 9 | Sam Hornish Jr. | Richard Petty Motorsports | Ford | 44.512 | 202.193 |
| 3 | 6 | Trevor Bayne (W) | Roush Fenway Racing | Ford | 44.512 | 202.193 |

*It was announced that the 87 of Joe Nemechek had withdrawn before practice

=== Second practice (February 14) ===
Michael McDowell was the fastest in the second practice session with a time of 45.153 and a speed of 199.322 mph (320.778 km/h). Ryan Newman was forced to change engines after blowing one half an hour into the session. He had to start from the rear in one of the Duel races. Martin Truex Jr. also dealt with engine gremlins due to a crack in his car's oil pan, but did not change engines.

| Pos | No. | Driver | Team | Manufacturer | Time | Speed |
|---|---|---|---|---|---|---|
| 1 | 95 | Michael McDowell | Leavine Family Racing | Ford | 45.153 | 199.322 |
| 2 | 48 | Jimmie Johnson (W) | Hendrick Motorsports | Chevrolet | 45.155 | 199.314 |
| 3 | 33 | Ty Dillon | Hillman–Circle Sport | Chevrolet | 45.158 | 199.300 |

== Qualifying ==
"I wasn't behind the 44 [Sorenson]. He came flying around, come up on the apron, jumps in front of me, then runs over the 51 [Allgaier], stacks us all up and then I run into him. It's idiotic to be out here doing this anyway. There's no sense in being able to try to put on some cute show for whatever the hell this is. Then you have a guy out there doing this in desperation. There's no reason to be out here. These guys have spent six months working on these cars, busting their butts on these cars. But it ain't his fault. It's NASCAR's fault for putting us out in the middle of this crap for nothing. We used to come down here and worry about who would set on the front pole in the biggest race of the year. Now all we do is come down here and worry about how a start‑and‑park like this out of desperation is going to knock us out of the Daytona 500. We've been in meetings for 45 minutes just trying to figure out what in the hell everybody is going to do just so we can make the race. It's stupid. There's no sense in doing this."

— Clint Bowyer, after his incident in qualifying.

The pole qualifying took place at 1:35 p.m. Eastern time on Sunday, February 15, a week prior to the Daytona 500 race itself. After the 2014 Daytona 500, NASCAR eliminated the traditional single car qualifying format for the pole qualifying and introduced a knockout qualifying format commonly used in many series at Phoenix the following week. The restrictor plate track rules, first implemented at the fall Talladega race, were used.

- NASCAR randomly split the field into two groups for session 1 (one group had 25 cars, the other had 24). Each group had its own five minutes of track time. The fastest 24 cars overall from either group advanced to session 2.
- After a 10–minute break, these 24 cars got five minutes of track time for session 2. The qualifying times from session 1 were reset prior to the start of session 2. The fastest twelve cars in session 2 advanced to session 3.
- Following a seven–minute break, these 12 cars competed for the top two guaranteed spots in the final five–minute session. Again, the qualifying times from session 2 were reset prior to the start of session 3.

The top two times in the final qualifying session were locked in the front row of the Daytona 500 starting grid, while the other 41 starting spots were determined by the two Budweiser Duel races the following Thursday. If a driver failed to make the Top 15 in the Duels, the time that was used to calculate the four drivers that would qualify based on time – and to grid the seven drivers that took provisional starting positions was based solely on the fastest time they set – regardless of qualifying session.

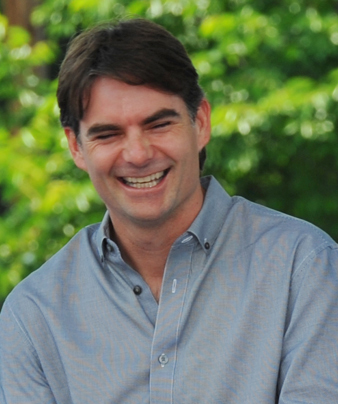
Jeff Gordon, seen here in 2012, started on the pole for his final Daytona 500.

In what would be his final Daytona 500 start, Jeff Gordon won the pole with a time of 44.711 and a speed of 201.293 mph (323.950 km/h). Gordon felt that in the new qualifying format, "the driver finally gets to play a role". He also stated that he had "a fast race car" and that the pole position was "one of the most gratifying poles I've had, not just because it's my final Daytona". His teammate Jimmie Johnson started right alongside in second. In the first round of qualifying, Clint Bowyer tried to go under Reed Sorenson when he got hit in the rear by Jeb Burton and turned right into Sorenson. Both cars hit the wall and collected Bobby Labonte and J. J. Yeley. Denny Hamlin also took some damage. The session was red flagged with a minute and 22 seconds left. After the red flag was lifted, no one was able to make it back to the line before time expired. Upon exiting his car, Bowyer vented his frustrations at the Daytona qualifying procedure. Other drivers like Ryan Newman and Kurt Busch also expressed their dislike of the qualifying procedure.

The cars of Dale Earnhardt Jr. and Denny Hamlin failed post-qualifying inspection and started from the rear of the field in their respective Duel races. Earnhardt's car was found to be too low on the left front – a rule implemented only for restrictor plate tracks – while the panhard rod on Hamlin's car was found to be 3–3.75 inches (76–95 mm) beyond the maximum allowed. Both drivers expressed thoughts on Twitter post-penalties, with both looking forward to moving up the order in the Duels. Both drivers had no time listed, meaning if either driver did not make the top 15 in the Duels, they would have to start 42nd or 43rd as they would be forced take a provisional and be placed behind all drivers with a legal time.

=== Qualifying results ===
| Pos | No. | Driver | Team | Manufacturer | R1 | R2 | R3 | Grid |
|---|---|---|---|---|---|---|---|---|
| 1 | 24 | Jeff Gordon (W) | Hendrick Motorsports | Chevrolet | 45.138 | 44.700 | 44.711 | 1 (1) |
| 2 | 48 | Jimmie Johnson (W) | Hendrick Motorsports | Chevrolet | 44.489 | 44.571 | 44.746 | 1 (2) |
| 3 | 11 | Denny Hamlin (Note: The qualifying times for Denny Hamlin and Dale Earnhardt Jr. were disallowed post-qualifying, for technical infractions. They started from the rear of the field in their respective Duel races.) | Joe Gibbs Racing | Toyota | 45.036 | 44.590 | 44.791 | 24 (2) |
| 4 | 20 | Matt Kenseth (W) | Joe Gibbs Racing | Toyota | 44.865 | 44.996 | 44.952 | 2 (1) |
| 5 | 18 | Kyle Busch | Joe Gibbs Racing | Toyota | 44.728 | 45.001 | 44.958 | 2 (2) |
| 6 | 5 | Kasey Kahne | Hendrick Motorsports | Chevrolet | 44.845 | 45.113 | 45.030 | 3 (1) |
| 7 | 19 | Carl Edwards | Joe Gibbs Racing | Toyota | 45.845 | 45.009 | 45.492 | 3 (2) |
| 8 | 33 | Ty Dillon | Hillman–Circle Sport | Chevrolet | 45.378 | 44.848 | 45.568 | 4 (1) |
| 9 | 3 | Austin Dillon | Richard Childress Racing | Chevrolet | 45.079 | 44.752 | 45.694 | 4 (2) |
| 10 | 88 | Dale Earnhardt Jr. (W) | Hendrick Motorsports | Chevrolet | 44.806 | 45.017 | 46.135 | 25 (1) |
| 11 | 1 | Jamie McMurray (W) | Chip Ganassi Racing | Chevrolet | 44.500 | 44.632 | 46.600 | 5 (1) |
| 12 | 78 | Martin Truex Jr. | Furniture Row Racing | Chevrolet | 45.376 | 45.059 | 47.200 | 5 (2) |
| 13 | 83 | Johnny Sauter | BK Racing | Toyota | 45.096 | 45.404 | — | 6 (1) |
| 14 | 16 | Greg Biffle | Roush Fenway Racing | Ford | 45.209 | 45.575 | — | 6 (2) |
| 15 | 6 | Trevor Bayne (W) | Roush Fenway Racing | Ford | 45.219 | 45.626 | — | 7 (1) |
| 16 | 9 | Sam Hornish Jr. | Richard Petty Motorsports | Ford | 45.199 | 45.629 | — | 7 (2) |
| 17 | 43 | Aric Almirola | Richard Petty Motorsports | Ford | 44.473 | 45.639 | — | 8 (1) |
| 18 | 17 | Ricky Stenhouse Jr. | Roush Fenway Racing | Ford | 44.481 | 45.728 | — | 8 (2) |
| 19 | 2 | Brad Keselowski | Team Penske | Ford | 45.212 | 46.546 | — | 9 (1) |
| 20 | 21 | Ryan Blaney | Wood Brothers Racing | Ford | 45.207 | 46.564 | — | 9 (2) |
| 21 | 22 | Joey Logano | Team Penske | Ford | 45.269 | 46.574 | — | 10 (1) |
| 22 | 55 | Michael Waltrip (W) | Michael Waltrip Racing | Toyota | 44.689 | 47.240 | — | 10 (2) |
| 23 | 23 | J. J. Yeley* | BK Racing | Toyota | 45.168 | 0.000 | — | 11 (1) |
| 24 | 32 | Bobby Labonte* | Go FAS Racing | Ford | 45.211 | 0.000 | — | 11 (2) |
| 25 | 27 | Paul Menard | Richard Childress Racing | Chevrolet | 45.380 | — | — | 12 (1) |
| 26 | 7 | Alex Bowman | Tommy Baldwin Racing | Chevrolet | 45.402 | — | — | 12 (2) |
| 27 | 47 | A. J. Allmendinger | JTG Daugherty Racing | Chevrolet | 45.406 | — | — | 13 (1) |
| 28 | 31 | Ryan Newman (W)* | Richard Childress Racing | Chevrolet | 45.414 | — | — | 13 (2) |
| 29 | 4 | Kevin Harvick (W) | Stewart–Haas Racing | Chevrolet | 45.456 | — | — | 14 (1) |
| 30 | 41 | Kurt Busch | Stewart–Haas Racing | Chevrolet | 45.460 | — | — | 14 (2) |
| 31 | 14 | Tony Stewart | Stewart–Haas Racing | Chevrolet | 45.462 | — | — | 15 (1) |
| 32 | 10 | Danica Patrick* | Stewart–Haas Racing | Chevrolet | 45.464 | — | — | 15 (2) |
| 33 | 13 | Casey Mears | Germain Racing | Chevrolet | 45.467 | — | — | 16 (1) |
| 34 | 62 | Brian Scott | Premium Motorsports | Chevrolet | 45.494 | — | — | 16 (2) |
| 35 | 46 | Michael Annett* | HScott Motorsports | Chevrolet | 45.789 | — | — | 17 (1) |
| 36 | 51 | Justin Allgaier | HScott Motorsports | Chevrolet | 45.794 | — | — | 17 (2) |
| 37 | 42 | Kyle Larson | Chip Ganassi Racing | Chevrolet | 46.015 | — | — | 18 (1) |
| 38 | 38 | David Gilliland | Front Row Motorsports | Ford | 46.072 | — | — | 18 (2) |
| 39 | 95 | Michael McDowell | Leavine Family Racing | Ford | 46.083 | — | — | 19 (1) |
| 40 | 26 | Jeb Burton (R)* | BK Racing | Toyota | 46.153 | — | — | 19 (2) |
| 41 | 15 | Clint Bowyer* | Michael Waltrip Racing | Toyota | 46.155 | — | — | 20 (1) |
| 42 | 44 | Reed Sorenson* | Team XTREME Racing | Chevrolet | 46.159 | — | — | 20 (2) |
| 43 | 29 | Justin Marks | RAB Racing | Toyota | 46.231 | — | — | 21 (1) |
| 44 | 34 | David Ragan | Front Row Motorsports | Ford | 46.284 | — | — | 21 (2) |
| 45 | 35 | Cole Whitt | Front Row Motorsports | Ford | 46.389 | — | — | 22 (1) |
| 46 | 98 | Josh Wise | Phil Parsons Racing | Ford | 46.539 | — | — | 22 (2) |
| 47 | 40 | Landon Cassill | Hillman–Circle Sport | Chevrolet | 46.560 | — | — | 23 (1) |
| 48 | 66 | Mike Wallace | Premium Motorsports | Toyota | 46.751 | — | — | 23 (2) |
| 49 | 30 | Ron Hornaday Jr. | The Motorsports Group | Chevrolet | 47.172 | — | — | 24 (1) |

| Key | Meaning |
|---|---|
| (1) | Race One |
| (2) | Race Two |
| * | Dropped to the rear |

== Practice (post-qualifying) ==
=== Third practice (February 18) ===
Kyle Busch was the fastest in the third practice session with a time of 44.826 and a speed of 200.776 mph (323.118 km/h). During this session, there was a four car wreck on the backstretch that involved Michael Annett, Jeb Burton, Denny Hamlin and Danica Patrick. It started when Hamlin pulled out of line and Patrick tried to follow him, but made contact with the right-front corner of Hamlin's car when she over-corrected and hit the wall. Michael Annett tried to go high around Patrick on the outside when he got turned by Jeb Burton. Patrick, Annett and Burton all switched to backup cars. After the incident, Patrick stated that her car "sort of just started turning toward the right, the back end was coming around and it swapped ends" and that Hamlin was trying to "make a third lane in the middle and it felt like it must have caught my bumper". Hamlin felt that Patrick had intended to block his path, stating that a driver has "to give a little bit of extra room in practice" and that if he "had to guess, she probably saw in her mirror that I was going down there and tried to stay in front of me".

| Pos | No. | Driver | Team | Manufacturer | Time | Speed |
|---|---|---|---|---|---|---|
| 1 | 18 | Kyle Busch | Joe Gibbs Racing | Toyota | 44.826 | 200.776 |
| 2 | 48 | Jimmie Johnson (W) | Hendrick Motorsports | Chevrolet | 44.881 | 200.530 |
| 3 | 6 | Trevor Bayne (W) | Roush Fenway Racing | Ford | 44.988 | 200.053 |

=== Fourth practice (February 18) ===
Alex Bowman was the fastest in the fourth practice session with a time of 44.889 and a speed of 200.495 mph (322.665 km/h).

| Pos | No. | Driver | Team | Manufacturer | Time | Speed |
|---|---|---|---|---|---|---|
| 1 | 7 | Alex Bowman | Tommy Baldwin Racing | Chevrolet | 44.889 | 200.495 |
| 2 | 5 | Kasey Kahne | Hendrick Motorsports | Chevrolet | 44.897 | 200.459 |
| 3 | 6 | Trevor Bayne (W) | Roush Fenway Racing | Ford | 44.913 | 200.387 |

=== Fifth practice (February 19) ===
Kyle Larson was the fastest in the fifth practice session with a time of 46.705 and a speed of 192.699 mph (310.119 km/h). This session had only five drivers take part in it doing single car runs.

| Pos | No. | Driver | Team | Manufacturer | Time | Speed |
|---|---|---|---|---|---|---|
| 1 | 42 | Kyle Larson | Chip Ganassi Racing | Chevrolet | 46.705 | 192.699 |
| 2 | 35 | Cole Whitt | Front Row Motorsports | Ford | 47.192 | 190.710 |
| 3 | 46 | Michael Annett | HScott Motorsports | Chevrolet | 47.344 | 190.098 |

== Budweiser Duel ==
The Budweiser Duels were held on Thursday, February 19. They consisted of two races, 150 miles (240 kilometers) in length, which served as the qualifying races for the Daytona 500. The first race involved the drivers that qualified in the odd numbered positions in pole qualifying. The second race involved the drivers that qualified in the even numbered positions and the five drivers that failed to make the race. The results of the two Budweiser Duels determined the starting lineup, behind the front row pre-determined by pole qualifying, for the weekend's Daytona 500 race.

=== Race one ===
==== First half ====
===== Start =====
The first race started at 7:19 p.m. Eastern time when Jeff Gordon led the field to the green. Matt Kenseth took the lead with the bottom lane to lead the first lap. The first caution of the race flew on lap 17 after Casey Mears blew an engine in turn 1. Kenseth and Gordon swapped the lead on pit road, and Gordon exited as the leader for the restart on lap 24. Michael Annett was forced to restart the race from the tail-end of the longest line, as his pit crew went over the wall too soon.

====== Trouble in the tri-oval ======
Kenseth used the bottom line and jumped in front of Gordon to take back the lead on lap 26, just ahead of the race's second caution when Johnny Sauter crashed in the tri-oval, following contact with A. J. Allmendinger, while Aric Almirola also picked up some damage to his car.

Sauter stated that he was "just riding along" and that he was "trying to mind my business" before the contact with Allmendinger, with the point of impact being "in the left rear quarter panel". He also stated that it was "a bummer deal" for himself and his BK Racing team. Sauter did, however, make the starting lineup for the race, on his qualifying speeds, while Allmendinger took a provisional. Allmendinger apologised for the contact with Sauter, while stating that his JTG Daugherty Racing car was fast, while also criticizing the racing that was occurring, stating that he "was trying to stay out of trouble and got put in the middle and I was trying to bail out of the middle". Michael McDowell dropped to the end of the longest line, for the restart on lap 33, after his crew was over the wall too soon.

==== Second half ====
Dale Earnhardt Jr. used a slight push from the bottom line to take the lead on lap 35. Kenseth drove past Earnhardt on the bottom to take back the lead on lap 39. On lap 43, Earnhardt used a slingshot move to overtake Kenseth for good. The third caution of the race flew on lap 51 when Trevor Bayne got loose, came down on Kyle Larson and hit the wall in turn 1. During this period, Ty Dillon broke his gear shifter. The race restarted with five laps to go and Earnhardt. held off Jeff Gordon to win race one.

==== Post-race ====
Earnhardt praised the work of his spotter T. J. Majors in victory lane, stating that he "gave me the information I needed to make the moves I needed" and that he was "looking forward to getting to Sunday and trying to get another Daytona 500 win". Dillon, finished 16th after the gearshift issues, and was able to make the field. He described the result as "hard to explain" and that he had "been coming here since I was a kid watching my grandfather's cars race". Ron Hornaday Jr. and Justin Marks failed to make the race.

==== Race one results ====
| Pos | Grid | No. | Driver | Team | Manufacturer | Laps |
|---|---|---|---|---|---|---|
| 1 | 25 | 88 | Dale Earnhardt Jr. (W) | Hendrick Motorsports | Chevrolet | 60 |
| 2 | 1 | 24 | Jeff Gordon (W) | Hendrick Motorsports | Chevrolet | 60 |
| 3 | 10 | 22 | Joey Logano | Team Penske | Ford | 60 |
| 4 | 15 | 14 | Tony Stewart | Stewart–Haas Racing | Chevrolet | 60 |
| 5 | 20 | 15 | Clint Bowyer | Michael Waltrip Racing | Toyota | 60 |
| 6 | 14 | 4 | Kevin Harvick (W) | Stewart–Haas Racing | Chevrolet | 60 |
| 7 | 3 | 5 | Kasey Kahne | Hendrick Motorsports | Chevrolet | 60 |
| 8 | 5 | 1 | Jamie McMurray (W) | Chip Ganassi Racing | Chevrolet | 60 |
| 9 | 23 | 40 | Landon Cassill | Hillman–Circle Sport | Chevrolet | 60 |
| 10 | 22 | 35 | Cole Whitt | Front Row Motorsports | Ford | 60 |
| 11 | 12 | 27 | Paul Menard | Richard Childress Racing | Chevrolet | 60 |
| 12 | 19 | 95 | Michael McDowell | Leavine Family Racing | Ford | 60 |
| 13 | 11 | 23 | J. J. Yeley | BK Racing | Toyota | 60 |
| 14 | 17 | 46 | Michael Annett | HScott Motorsports | Chevrolet | 60 |
| 15 | 18 | 42 | Kyle Larson | Chip Ganassi Racing | Chevrolet | 60 |
| 16 | 4 | 33 | Ty Dillon | Hillman–Circle Sport | Chevrolet | 60 |
| 17 | 2 | 20 | Matt Kenseth (W) | Joe Gibbs Racing | Toyota | 60 |
| 18 | 21 | 29 | Justin Marks | RAB Racing | Toyota | 60 |
| 19 | 9 | 2 | Brad Keselowski | Team Penske | Ford | 60 |
| 20 | 8 | 43 | Aric Almirola | Richard Petty Motorsports | Ford | 60 |
| 21 | 24 | 30 | Ron Hornaday Jr. | The Motorsports Group | Chevrolet | 60 |
| 22 | 7 | 6 | Trevor Bayne (W) | Roush Fenway Racing | Ford | 60 |
| 23 | 13 | 47 | A. J. Allmendinger | JTG Daugherty Racing | Chevrolet | 27 |
| 24 | 6 | 83 | Johnny Sauter | BK Racing | Toyota | 27 |
| 25 | 16 | 13 | Casey Mears | Germain Racing | Chevrolet | 17 |

=== Race two ===
==== First half ====
===== Start =====
Before the start, Josh Wise stalled at the entrance of pit road and took his car to the garage. This ultimately eliminated him from racing in the Daytona 500. The second race started 18 minutes late at 9:19 p.m. with Jimmie Johnson leading the field to the green flag. Kyle Busch took the lead on the first lap. The first caution of the race flew on lap 19 for a spin by David Ragan, exiting turn 4. Ragan had cut across the nose of Justin Allgaier and got turned down onto the apron, making contact with the inside wall. Kyle Busch was first off pit road, but he was caught speeding on pit road and was forced to drop to the end of the line, allowing Johnson to retake the lead for the restart, on lap 25. Allgaier was also sent to the rear, as his pit crew came across the wall too soon.

==== Second half ====
The second caution of the race flew on lap 37 for a multi-car wreck in the tri-oval. It started exiting turn 4 when Jeb Burton turned down into Sam Hornish Jr. who turned into Alex Bowman. Austin Dillon destroyed his splitter driving through the grass trying to avoid the wreck, which caused the race to be red flagged for five minutes. The race restarted with 20 laps to go. With 14 laps to go, Kurt Busch was given a drive-through penalty for passing below the double yellow line. The third caution of the race flew with three laps to go for a four car wreck in turn 3. Denny Hamlin gave Danica Patrick a push which turned her around and collected Brian Scott and Bobby Labonte.

In a green–white–checker finish, Johnson held off a last lap charge by Kyle Busch and Carl Edwards to win the race. Johnson defined the Speedweeks at Daytona as "awesome" for his Hendrick Motorsports team, sweeping the Duels and the front row for the Daytona 500. Johnson also called his car as "mad fast".

==== Post-race ====
Patrick confronted Hamlin on pit road after the race. After the confrontation, Patrick told reporters that she had "no explanation for that", while also stating Hamlin was in the wrong by believing "that he's taking the air and getting it off the spoiler, and he's not squared up either". Michael Annett, Ryan Blaney, Landon Cassill, Ty Dillon, Michael McDowell, Reed Sorenson, Mike Wallace, Cole Whitt and J. J. Yeley raced their way into the Daytona 500. Bobby Labonte also made the race, via the provisional for past series champions. Alex Bowman, Burton, Ron Hornaday Jr., Justin Marks, Scott and Wise all failed to make the race.

==== Race two results ====
| Pos | Grid | No. | Driver | Team | Manufacturer | Laps |
|---|---|---|---|---|---|---|
| 1 | 1 | 48 | Jimmie Johnson (W) | Hendrick Motorsports | Chevrolet | 64 |
| 2 | 2 | 18 | Kyle Busch | Joe Gibbs Racing | Toyota | 64 |
| 3 | 3 | 19 | Carl Edwards | Joe Gibbs Racing | Toyota | 64 |
| 4 | 6 | 16 | Greg Biffle | Roush Fenway Racing | Ford | 64 |
| 5 | 5 | 78 | Martin Truex Jr. | Furniture Row Racing | Chevrolet | 64 |
| 6 | 9 | 21 | Ryan Blaney | Wood Brothers Racing | Ford | 64 |
| 7 | 20 | 44 | Reed Sorenson | Team XTREME Racing | Chevrolet | 64 |
| 8 | 23 | 66 | Mike Wallace | Premium Motorsports | Toyota | 64 |
| 9 | 17 | 51 | Justin Allgaier | HScott Motorsports | Chevrolet | 64 |
| 10 | 15 | 10 | Danica Patrick | Stewart–Haas Racing | Chevrolet | 64 |
| 11 | 13 | 31 | Ryan Newman (W) | Richard Childress Racing | Chevrolet | 64 |
| 12 | 14 | 41 | Kurt Busch | Stewart–Haas Racing | Chevrolet | 64 |
| 13 | 18 | 38 | David Gilliland | Front Row Motorsports | Ford | 64 |
| 14 | 21 | 34 | David Ragan | Front Row Motorsports | Ford | 64 |
| 15 | 4 | 3 | Austin Dillon | Richard Childress Racing | Chevrolet | 64 |
| 16 | 8 | 17 | Ricky Stenhouse Jr. | Roush Fenway Racing | Ford | 64 |
| 17 | 16 | 62 | Brian Scott | Premium Motorsports | Chevrolet | 64 |
| 18 | 24 | 11 | Denny Hamlin | Joe Gibbs Racing | Toyota | 64 |
| 19 | 10 | 55 | Michael Waltrip (W) | Michael Waltrip Racing | Toyota | 64 |
| 20 | 11 | 32 | Bobby Labonte | Go FAS Racing | Ford | 60 |
| 21 | 7 | 9 | Sam Hornish Jr. | Richard Petty Motorsports | Ford | 36 |
| 22 | 19 | 26 | Jeb Burton (R) | BK Racing | Toyota | 36 |
| 23 | 12 | 7 | Alex Bowman | Tommy Baldwin Racing | Chevrolet | 36 |
| 24 | 22 | 98 | Josh Wise | Phil Parsons Racing | Ford | 1 |

=== Starting lineup ===
| Pos | No. | Driver | Team | Manufacturer | Notes |
|---|---|---|---|---|---|
| 1 | 24 | Jeff Gordon (W) | Hendrick Motorsports | Chevrolet | Fastest in pole qualifying |
| 2 | 48 | Jimmie Johnson (W) | Hendrick Motorsports | Chevrolet | Second fastest in pole qualifying |
| 3 | 88 | Dale Earnhardt Jr. (W) | Hendrick Motorsports | Chevrolet | Duel race #1 winner |
| 4 | 18 | Matt Crafton (Note: Kyle Busch qualified and raced the car in the Budweiser Duel, but was injured during the Alert Today Florida 300 Xfinity Series race, held the day before the Daytona 500. Matt Crafton started from the rear of the field due to the driver change.) | Joe Gibbs Racing | Toyota | Second in Budweiser Duel 2 |
| 5 | 22 | Joey Logano | Team Penske | Ford | Third in Budweiser Duel 1 |
| 6 | 19 | Carl Edwards | Joe Gibbs Racing | Toyota | Third in Budweiser Duel 2 |
| 7 | 14 | Tony Stewart | Stewart–Haas Racing | Chevrolet | Fourth in Budweiser Duel 1 |
| 8 | 16 | Greg Biffle | Roush Fenway Racing | Ford | Fourth in Budweiser Duel 2 |
| 9 | 15 | Clint Bowyer | Michael Waltrip Racing | Toyota | Fifth in Budweiser Duel 1 |
| 10 | 78 | Martin Truex Jr. | Furniture Row Racing | Chevrolet | Fifth in Budweiser Duel 2 |
| 11 | 4 | Kevin Harvick (W) | Stewart–Haas Racing | Chevrolet | Sixth in Budweiser Duel 1 |
| 12 | 21 | Ryan Blaney | Wood Brothers Racing | Ford | Sixth in Budweiser Duel 2 |
| 13 | 5 | Kasey Kahne | Hendrick Motorsports | Chevrolet | Seventh in Budweiser Duel 1 |
| 14 | 44 | Reed Sorenson | Team XTREME Racing | Chevrolet | Seventh in Budweiser Duel 2 |
| 15 | 1 | Jamie McMurray (W) | Chip Ganassi Racing | Chevrolet | Eighth in Budweiser Duel 1 |
| 16 | 66 | Mike Wallace | Premium Motorsports | Chevrolet | Eighth in Budweiser Duel 2 |
| 17 | 40 | Landon Cassill | Hillman–Circle Sport | Chevrolet | Ninth in Budweiser Duel 1 |
| 18 | 51 | Justin Allgaier | HScott Motorsports | Chevrolet | Ninth in Budweiser Duel 2 |
| 19 | 35 | Cole Whitt | Front Row Motorsports | Ford | 10th in Budweiser Duel 1 |
| 20 | 10 | Danica Patrick (Note: Danica Patrick, David Ragan, Kyle Larson, Austin Dillon, Johnny Sauter, Trevor Bayne, Sam Hornish Jr., A. J. Allmendinger and Bobby Labonte all started from the rear for switching to backup cars after their respective Duel races.) | Stewart–Haas Racing | Chevrolet | 10th in Budweiser Duel 2 |
| 21 | 27 | Paul Menard | Richard Childress Racing | Chevrolet | 11th in Budweiser Duel 1 |
| 22 | 31 | Ryan Newman (W) (Note: Ryan Newman started from the rear for an unapproved engine change.) | Richard Childress Racing | Chevrolet | 11th in Budweiser Duel 2 |
| 23 | 95 | Michael McDowell | Leavine Family Racing | Ford | 12th in Budweiser Duel 1 |
| 24 | 41 | Regan Smith (Note: Kurt Busch qualified and raced the car in the Budweiser Duel, but was suspended indefinitely by NASCAR due to ongoing allegations of domestic violence. Because of this driver change, Regan Smith started from the rear.) | Stewart–Haas Racing | Chevrolet | 12th in Budweiser Duel 2 |
| 25 | 23 | J. J. Yeley | BK Racing | Toyota | 13th in Budweiser Duel 1 |
| 26 | 38 | David Gilliland | Front Row Motorsports | Ford | 13th in Budweiser Duel 2 |
| 27 | 46 | Michael Annett | HScott Motorsports | Chevrolet | 14th in Budweiser Duel 1 |
| 28 | 34 | David Ragan | Front Row Motorsports | Ford | 14th in Budweiser Duel 2 |
| 29 | 42 | Kyle Larson | Chip Ganassi Racing | Chevrolet | 15th in Budweiser Duel 1 |
| 30 | 3 | Austin Dillon | Richard Childress Racing | Chevrolet | 15th in Budweiser Duel 2 |
| 31 | 33 | Ty Dillon | Hillman–Circle Sport | Chevrolet | 16th in Budweiser Duel 1 |
| 32 | 17 | Ricky Stenhouse Jr. | Roush Fenway Racing | Ford | 16th in Budweiser Duel 2 |
| 33 | 43 | Aric Almirola | Richard Petty Motorsports | Ford | Qualifying Speed |
| 34 | 55 | Michael Waltrip (W) | Michael Waltrip Racing | Toyota | Qualifying Speed |
| 35 | 20 | Matt Kenseth (W) | Joe Gibbs Racing | Toyota | Qualifying Speed |
| 36 | 83 | Johnny Sauter | BK Racing | Toyota | Qualifying Speed |
| 37 | 6 | Trevor Bayne (W) | Roush Fenway Racing | Ford | Provisional |
| 38 | 9 | Sam Hornish Jr. | Richard Petty Motorsports | Ford | Provisional |
| 39 | 2 | Brad Keselowski | Team Penske | Ford | Provisional |
| 40 | 47 | A. J. Allmendinger | JTG Daugherty Racing | Chevrolet | Provisional |
| 41 | 13 | Casey Mears | Germain Racing | Chevrolet | Provisional |
| 42 | 11 | Denny Hamlin | Joe Gibbs Racing | Toyota | Provisional |
| 43 | 32 | Bobby Labonte | Go FAS Racing | Ford | Past Champion's Provisional |
Did not qualify
| 44 | 7 | Alex Bowman | Tommy Baldwin Racing | Chevrolet | |
| 45 | 62 | Brian Scott | Premium Motorsports | Chevrolet | |
| 46 | 26 | Jeb Burton (R) | BK Racing | Toyota | |
| 47 | 29 | Justin Marks | RAB Racing | Toyota | |
| 48 | 98 | Josh Wise | Phil Parsons Racing | Ford | |
| 49 | 30 | Ron Hornaday Jr. | The Motorsports Group | Chevrolet | |
| 50 | 87 | Joe Nemechek | NEMCO Motorsports | Chevrolet | Withdrew before practice |

== Suspension of Kurt Busch ==
"Given the serious nature of the findings and conclusions made by the Commissioner of the Family Court of the State of Delaware, NASCAR has indefinitely suspended driver Kurt Busch, effective immediately. He will not be allowed to race nor participate in any NASCAR activities until further notice. Kurt Busch and his Stewart–Haas Racing team are fully aware of our position and why this decision was made. We will continue to respect the process and timetable of the authorities involved."

— A statement released by NASCAR confirming Busch's suspension.

Kurt Busch was suspended by NASCAR on February 20, 2015 due to his then ongoing legal battle with possible domestic violence charges. NASCAR released an official statement, which was later confirmed at a press briefing with executive vice president Steve O'Donnell. Regan Smith replaced Busch for the Daytona 500 and, per NASCAR's rules regarding post-qualifying driver changes, was required to start at the rear of the field.

On Saturday, the day after the suspension was announced, Kurt Busch appealed the suspension to the National Motorsports Appeals Panel. The panelists selected were IndyCar driver Lyn St. James, Kevin Whitaker, and Paul Brooks. The panel denied Busch's appeal after a 3-hour hearing. So did National Motorsports Final Appeals Officer, Bryan Moss.

== Practice (post-Duels) ==
=== Sixth practice (February 20) ===
Jeff Gordon was the fastest in the sixth practice session with a time of 46.613 and a speed of 193.079 mph (310.731 km/h).

| Pos | No. | Driver | Team | Manufacturer | Time | Speed |
|---|---|---|---|---|---|---|
| 1 | 24 | Jeff Gordon (W) | Hendrick Motorsports | Chevrolet | 46.613 | 193.079 |
| 2 | 55 | Michael Waltrip (W) | Michael Waltrip Racing | Toyota | 46.757 | 192.485 |
| 3 | 78 | Martin Truex Jr. | Furniture Row Racing | Chevrolet | 46.791 | 192.345 |

=== Seventh practice (February 20) ===
Dale Earnhardt Jr. was the fastest in the seventh practice session with a time of 46.295 and a speed of 194.405 mph (312.865 km/h).

| Pos | No. | Driver | Team | Manufacturer | Time | Speed |
|---|---|---|---|---|---|---|
| 1 | 88 | Dale Earnhardt Jr. (W) | Hendrick Motorsports | Chevrolet | 46.295 | 194.405 |
| 2 | 5 | Kasey Kahne | Hendrick Motorsports | Chevrolet | 46.505 | 193.528 |
| 3 | 48 | Jimmie Johnson (W) | Hendrick Motorsports | Chevrolet | 46.609 | 193.096 |

=== Final practice (February 21) ===
Denny Hamlin was the fastest in the final practice session with a time of 44.531 and a speed of 202.106 mph (325.258 km/h).

| Pos | No. | Driver | Team | Manufacturer | Time | Speed |
|---|---|---|---|---|---|---|
| 1 | 11 | Denny Hamlin | Joe Gibbs Racing | Toyota | 44.531 | 202.106 |
| 2 | 5 | Kasey Kahne | Hendrick Motorsports | Chevrolet | 44.549 | 202.025 |
| 3 | 16 | Greg Biffle | Roush Fenway Racing | Ford | 44.587 | 201.853 |

== Prior to the race ==
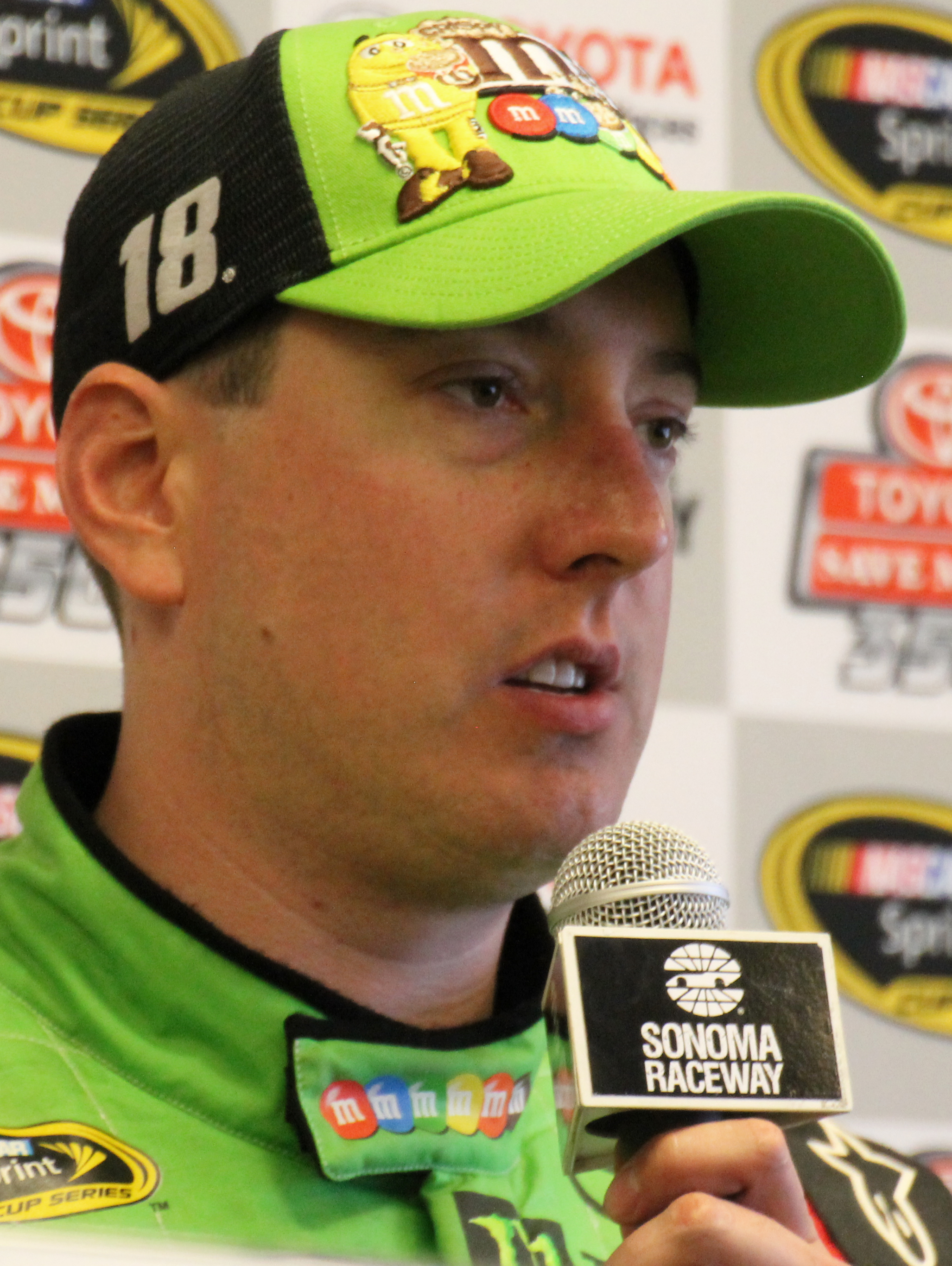
Kyle Busch, pictured at the Toyota/Save Mart 350 later in the season, was injured during the Xfinity Series race and was unable to compete in the Daytona 500.

With nine laps to go in the Alert Today Florida 300 Xfinity Series race on the day before the Daytona 500, Kyle Busch crashed into the inside retaining wall between the tri-oval and turn 1. He was taken to the nearby Halifax Health Medical Center after sustaining a compound fracture to his right leg, ruling him out of the Daytona 500. The wall he hit lacked a SAFER barrier, drawing much criticism from different drivers. Ty Dillon, who finished third, was unaware of Busch's injury at the end of the race, while also adding that it was coming "to the point now in NASCAR we should have SAFER barriers at a place like this". Runner-up Chris Buescher echoed Dillon's comments, stating that the sport "needs to be as safe as possible" and that if "it means lining the inside walls as well, it's probably a good idea".

With the sidelining of Kyle Busch, the Daytona 500 was the first race since the 2001 NAPA 500 at Atlanta – where Kurt Busch failed to qualify – not to feature a Busch brother in the starting lineup. Matt Crafton replaced Kyle Busch for the Daytona 500, while David Ragan and Erik Jones replaced him thereafter.

== Race ==
=== Pre-race festivities ===
Daytona International Speedway on the day of the 2015 Daytona 500.

Ronnie Barton of the First Baptist Church of South Daytona began the pre-race festivities with the invocation. Singer/songwriter Phillip Phillips performed the United States National Anthem. The flyover was performed by the United States Air Force Thunderbirds. Vince Vaughn gave the command for the drivers to start their engines, while Paralympics bronze medalist Amy Purdy was the honorary pace car driver for the pre-race pace laps.

=== First half ===
==== Start ====
The green flag flies on a new season of NASCAR.

With members of the United States women's national soccer team waving the green flag, pole sitter Jeff Gordon led the field to the start of the 2015 NASCAR Sprint Cup Series season under clear skies at 1:31 p.m. Eastern time. He led the first lap in his final Daytona 500, but was quickly passed by his teammate Jimmie Johnson on the second lap. Johnson then maintained control of the lead until lap 14 when he was shuffled up to the outside lane and Gordon took back the lead. The first caution flag of the race flew on lap 19 when Landon Cassill blew an engine exiting turn 2. Michael Annett, J. J. Yeley and Casey Mears all stayed out to lead a lap when Gordon and the others pitted. Cole Whitt was forced to restart the race from the rear of the field, as he was serviced by too many members at his pit stop.

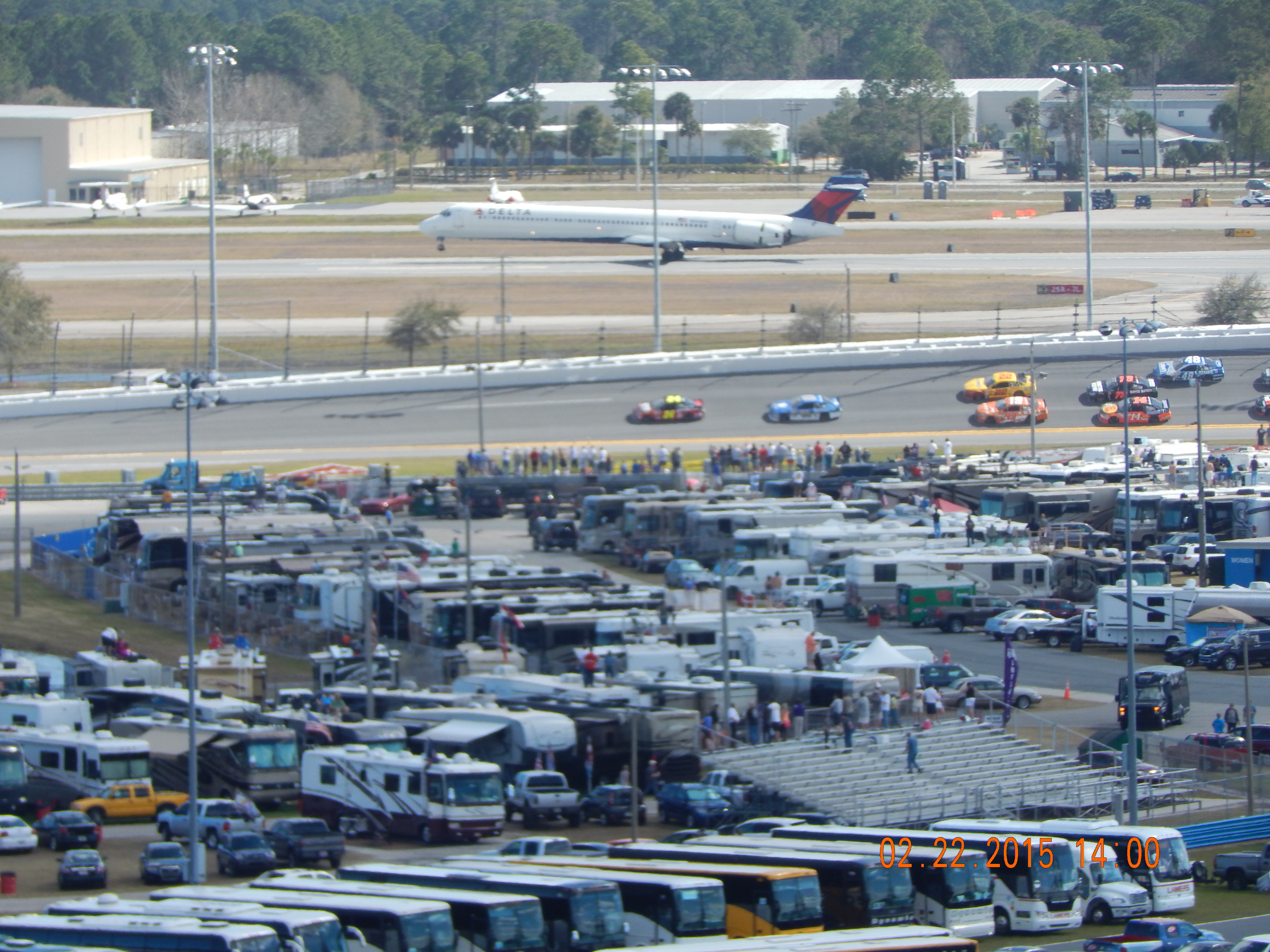
A Delta Air Lines plane lands as the field races by on the 27th lap.

The race restarted on lap 25 with Gordon in the lead. The second caution of the race flew on lap 41 when Tony Stewart and Matt Kenseth got into the wall exiting turn 4; Stewart's car was loose exiting the turn and got turned by Ryan Blaney into the wall. Kenseth, braking to avoid contact with Blaney, got turned into the wall by Michael Waltrip. Kenseth pitted and lost two laps, while Stewart was forced to go to the garage. Stewart took responsibility for the incident, stating that "when it got three-wide that particular lap, it got away from me", and that when he had decelerated, he "couldn't even get the front end caught up".

==== Second quarter ====
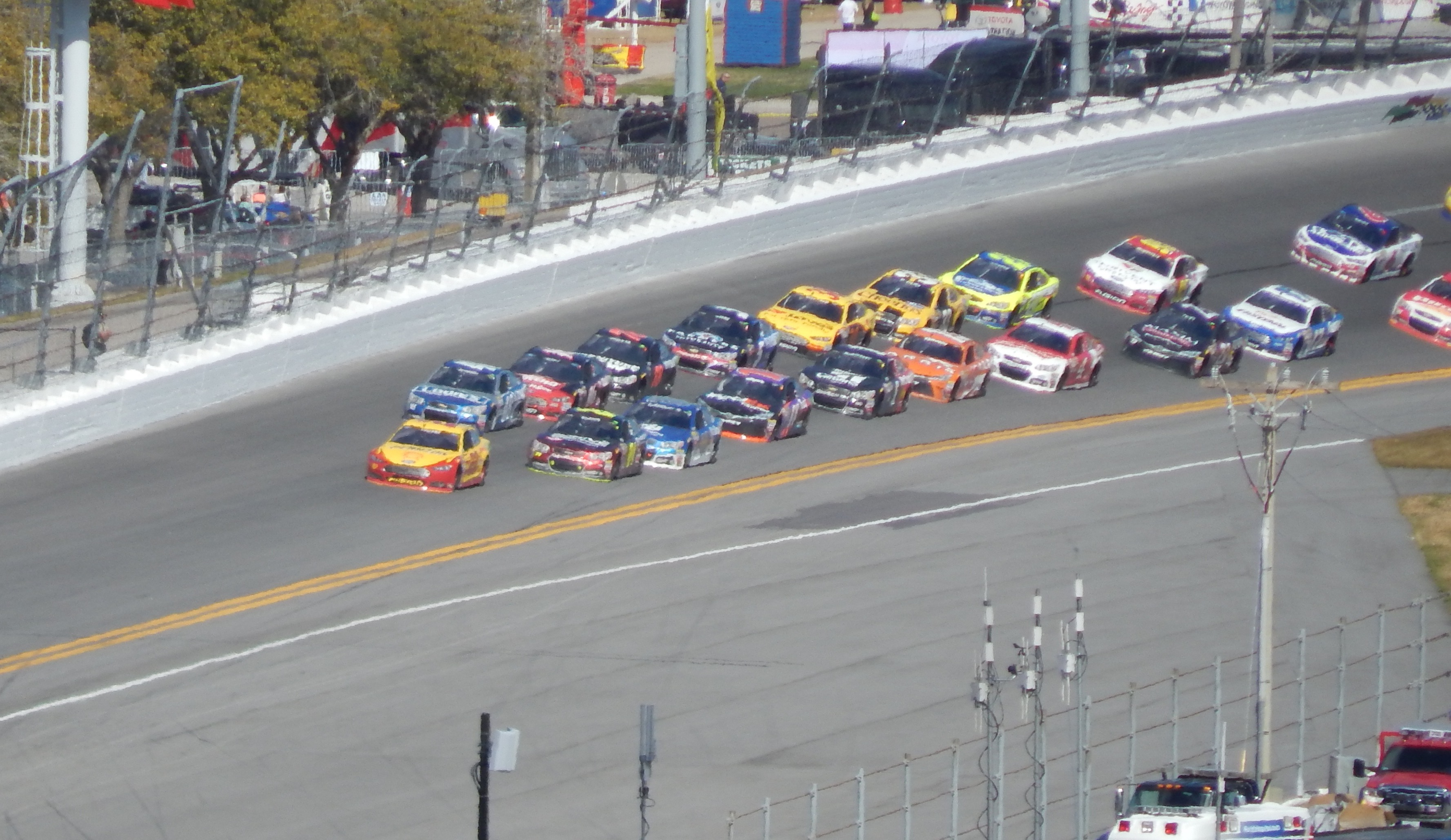
Joey Logano took the lead for the first time on the 47th lap.

The race restarted on lap 46 and Joey Logano used the high line to overtake Gordon for the lead on lap 47 with Johnson and Earnhardt Jr. close behind. On lap 53, Gordon took back the lead from Logano. Gordon, Earnhardt., Martin Truex Jr. and Kasey Kahne broke away from the pack single file, remaining that way for the next 15 laps. Thereafter, the field became largely a single-file train running up next to the wall. Nearing the end of the fuel run, the field began to bunch up and two lines of cars formed up behind Gordon. Earnhardt Jr., Kahne and Truex. moved side-by-side behind Gordon, allowing the pack to catch up to the leaders again. Gordon continued to maintain the lead until the next green flag pit-stop sequence that began on lap 85; he surrendered the lead on lap 87 to make his stop and Carl Edwards assumed the lead. Denny Hamlin took the lead after driving past teammate Edwards on pit road the next lap. Johnson was forced to serve a drive-through penalty for his crew being over the wall too soon. Edwards, Bobby Labonte, Kyle Larson, Truex. and Mike Wallace all served drive-through penalties for speeding. After stops were complete, Gordon reassumed the lead on lap 90.

=== Second half ===
==== Halfway ====
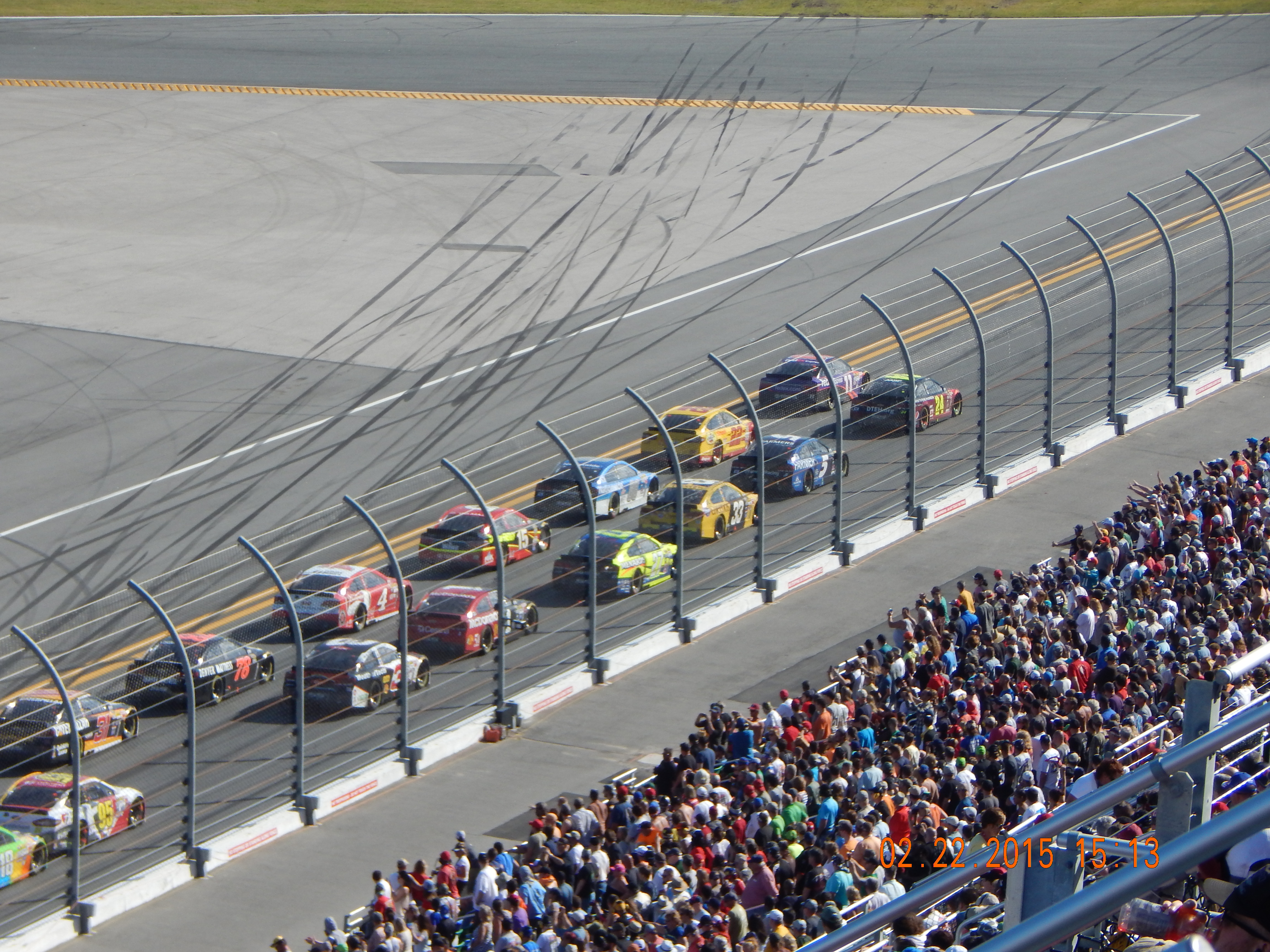
The green flag flies again at Daytona.

Debris in the tri-oval brought out the third caution of the race on lap 105, as a hose-piece was seen near the start-finish line. After pit stops, Gordon continued to lead over Hamlin, Casey Mears and Kahne. A. J. Allmendinger stayed out to lead a lap before pitting. Justin Allgaier dropped to the rear for an uncontrolled tire and Aric Almirola dropped to the rear for too many men over the wall.

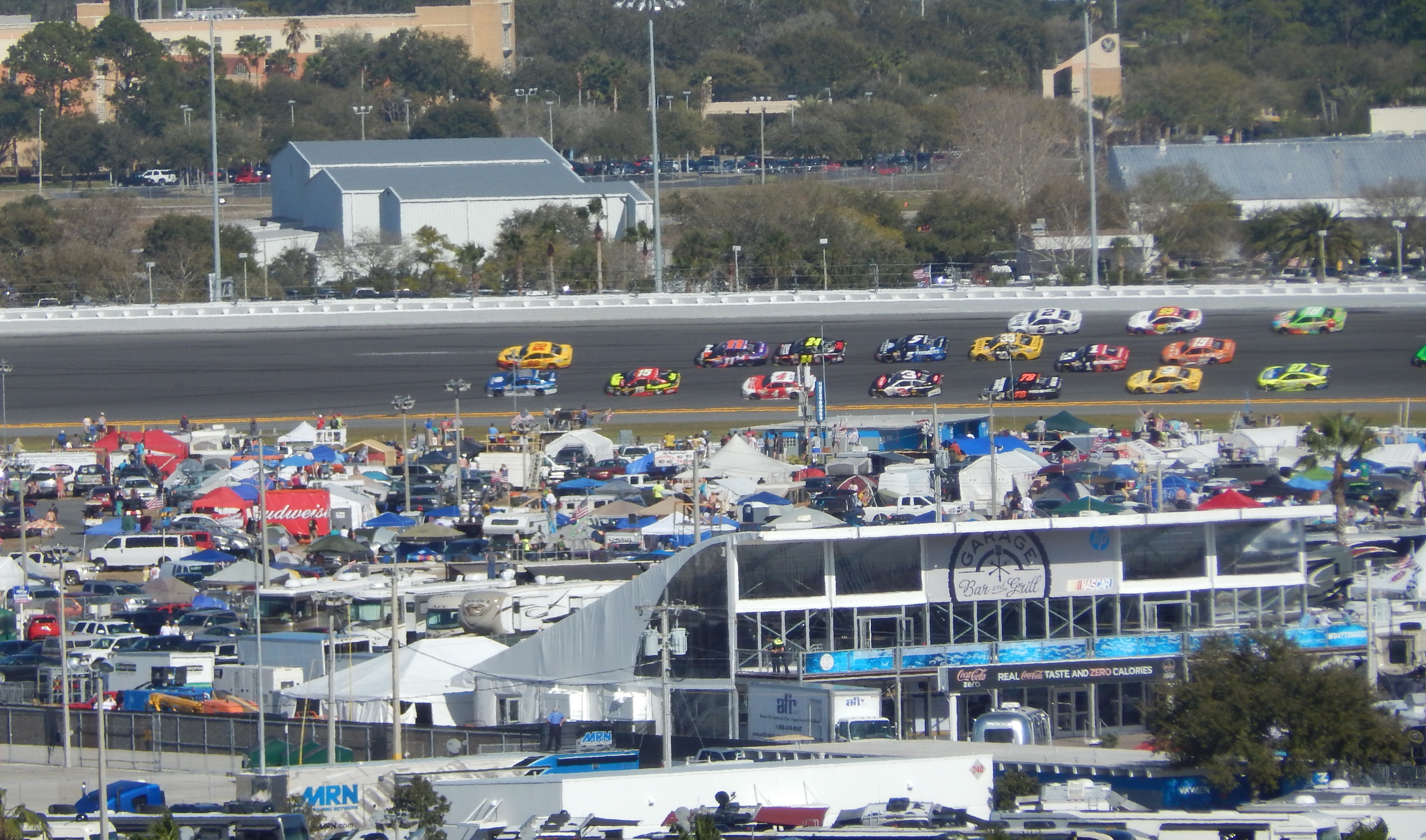
Dale Earnhardt Jr. took the lead with 85 laps remaining.

The race restarted with 90 laps to go with Gordon leading. Hamlin took the lead from Gordon with 88 laps to go, but he was passed one lap later by Logano who drove under him on the inside line. Three laps later, Dale Earnhardt Jr. took the lead and remained at the head of the train until Logano drove under him for the lead with 55 laps to go. Green flag stops began with 49 laps to go, and Logano surrendered the lead to pit with 47 laps to go and Greg Biffle assumed the lead. Larson locked up his brakes entering pit road and plowed some of the infield grass getting down to pit road speed. After the pit stop sequence, Logano reassumed the lead, as Yeley was caught speeding on pit road and was forced to serve a drive-through penalty.

==== Fourth quarter ====
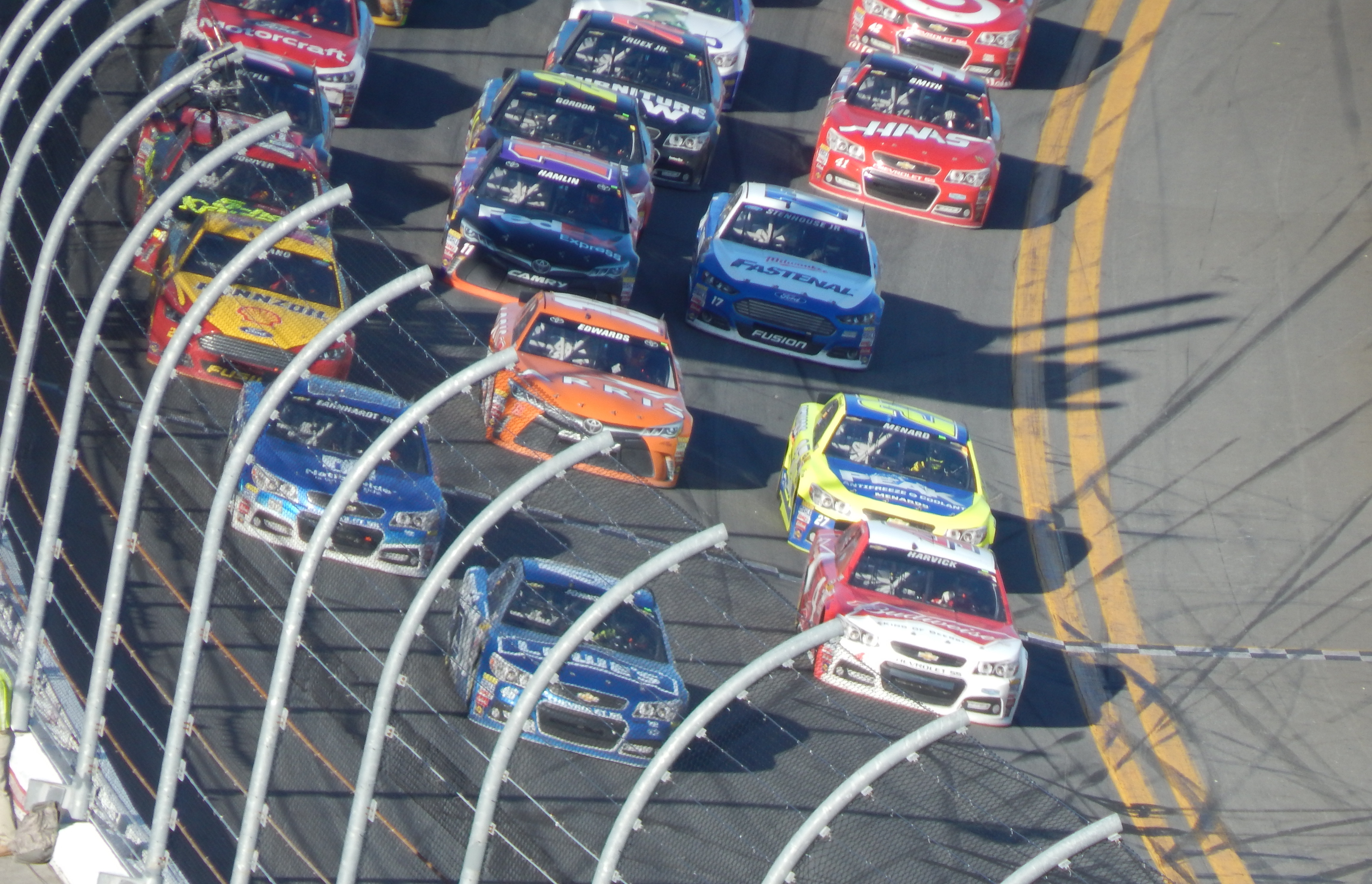
Jimmie Johnson leads the field racing three-wide multiple rows back with 32 laps remaining.

Jimmie Johnson took back the lead with 42 laps to go. Brad Keselowski's engine expired with 40 laps to go, causing Jamie McMurray and Ryan Newman to collide, and this brought out the fourth caution of the race. Keselowski told reporters that the blown engine was caused by "something in the oil pan, broke something important", while stating that he was "starting to get position," ahead of the final 100 miles of the race. Roughly half of the field pitted for fuel under the caution, with the other half staying out for track position, but without assurance that they had enough fuel to make it to the end of the race. Reed Sorenson was caught speeding on pit road and was forced to restart the race from the rear of the field.

The race restarted with 35 laps to go. Johnson had the lead, but was quickly passed by Edwards. Two laps later, Johnson retook the lead from Edwards on the outside. With 32 laps to go, the field was racing three-wide multiple rows back. The fifth caution of the race flew with 25 laps to go when Blaney's car blew an engine on the back straight. A number of the drivers who did not pit under the previous caution pitted under this caution.

===== Restart and red flag =====
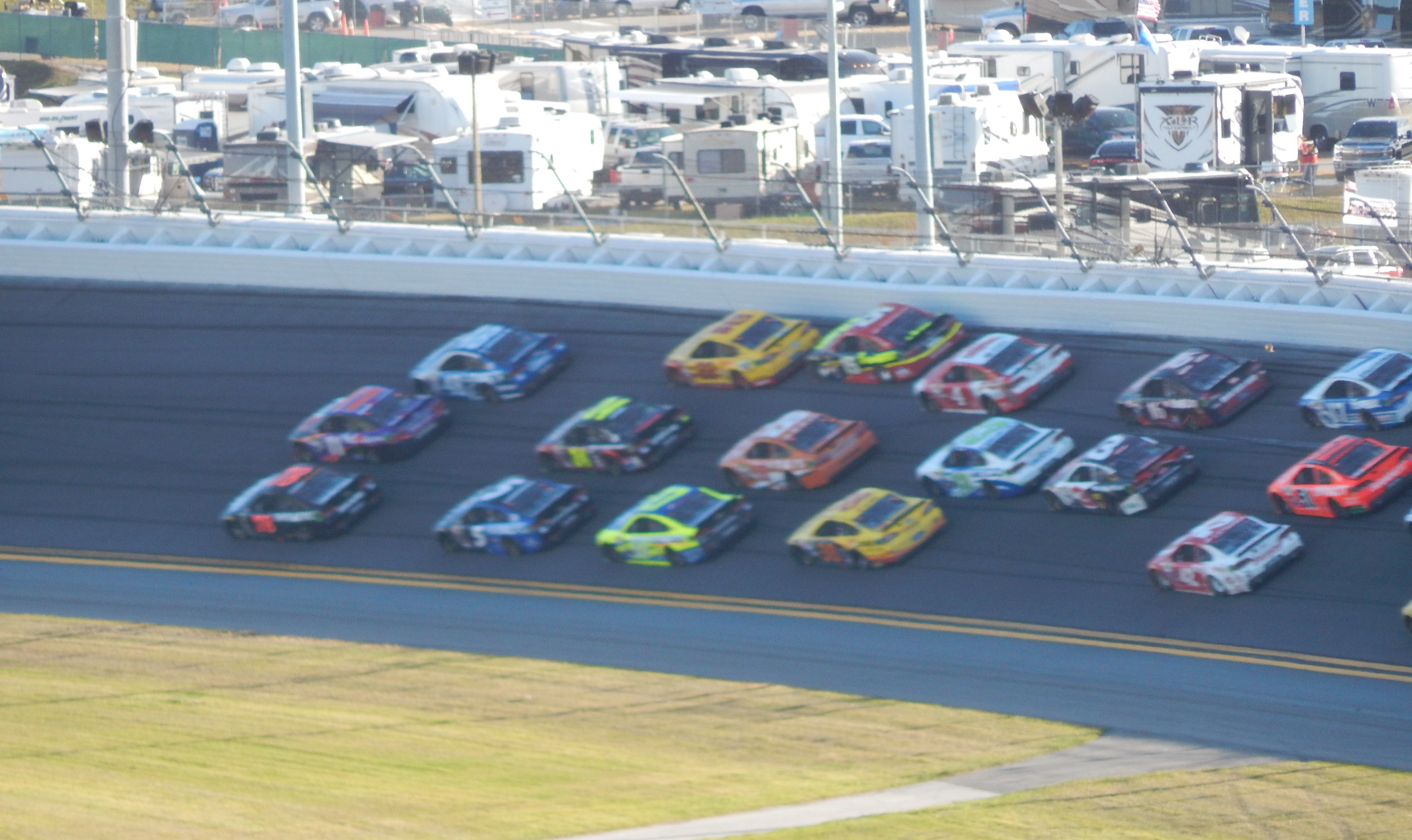
Denny Hamlin led with 11 laps remaining.

The race restarted with 19 laps to go. Two laps later, the field was racing three-wide multiple rows from the lead to the tail. Denny Hamlin drove underneath Jimmie Johnson for the lead, but was immediately passed by Truex. Hamlin took the lead with 11 laps to go, using the middle lane. Logano took the lead on the following lap, leading the next seven laps until Allgaier and Ty Dillon wrecked in the tri-oval, which brought out the sixth caution and forced a green–white–checker finish. The red flag was displayed for 6 minutes and 42 seconds, as Allgaier's car had spilled a large amount of oil on the race track.

===== Finish =====
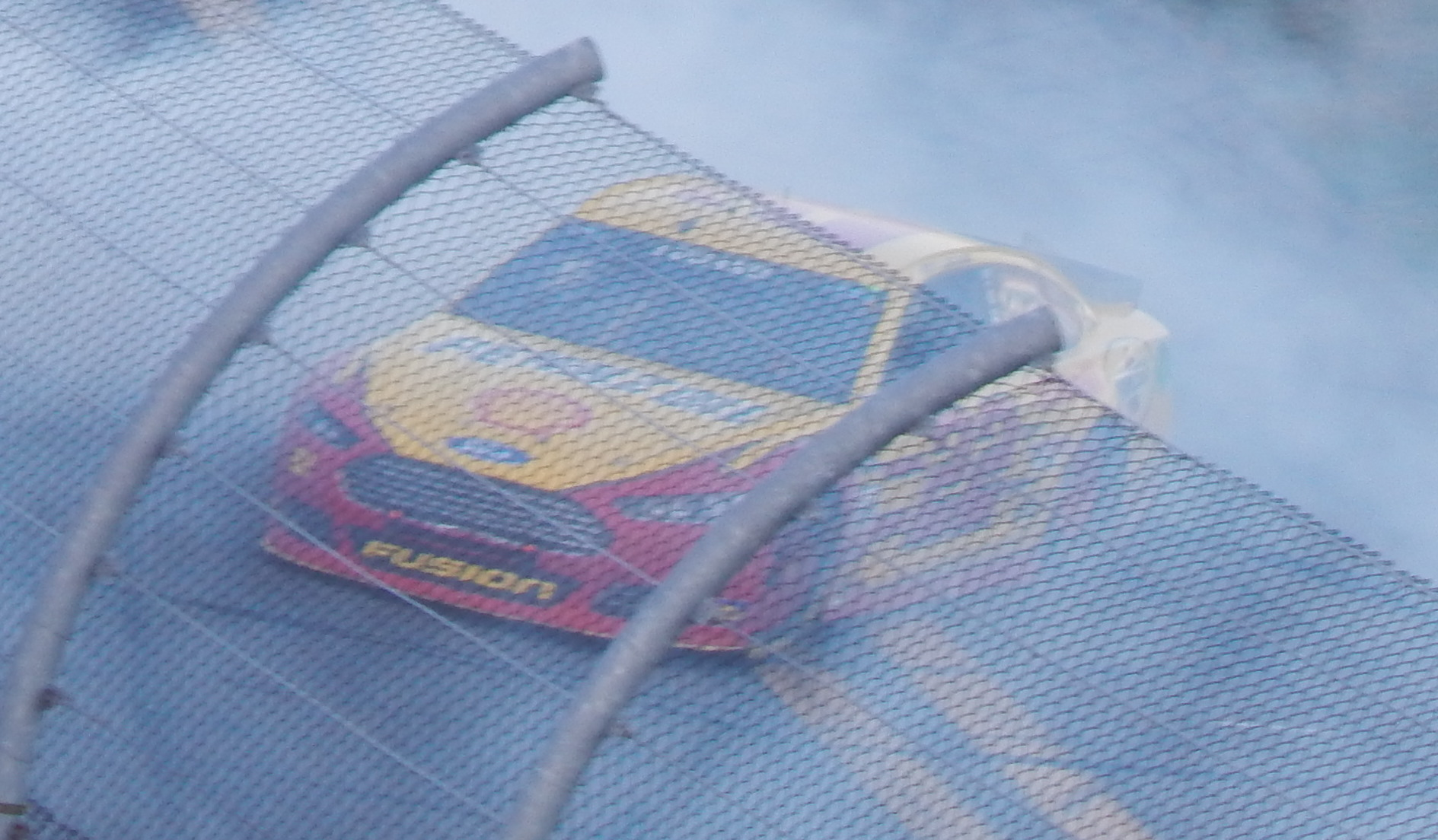
Joey Logano celebrates winning the Daytona 500.

"What an amazing moment. Wow. To win this race is just amazing. I have the best team on pit road for sure. These guys are awesome. My spotter did a great job giving me the information I need to get out front and stay out front before that last caution and be able to have a good restart there at the end. That feeling of winning the Daytona 500, I can't explain how cool this is. I said in an interview that this was our worst racetrack last year and we worked really hard to figure out how we could get better at it and all the hard work got us the win today. It feels just like the way you dream it. This is better than Disney World in here!"

— Joey Logano, after becoming the second-youngest winner of the Daytona 500.

The race restarted with two laps to go with Logano leading. On the final lap, a huge pileup occurred on the back straight involving Jeff Gordon, Kyle Larson, Ricky Stenhouse Jr., A. J. Allmendinger, Trevor Bayne and Reed Sorenson. As the leaders entered turn 3, the caution was displayed. Logano coasted across the finish line to score his first Daytona 500 victory and the second for car owner Roger Penske. At the age of 24, Logano was the second youngest winner of the Daytona 500, with only Bayne – aged 20, in the 2011 race – winning at a younger age.

=== Race results ===
| Pos | No. | Driver | Team | Manufacturer | Laps | Points |
|---|---|---|---|---|---|---|
| 1 | 22 | Joey Logano | Team Penske | Ford | 203 | 47 |
| 2 | 4 | Kevin Harvick (W) | Stewart–Haas Racing | Chevrolet | 203 | 42 |
| 3 | 88 | Dale Earnhardt Jr. (W) | Hendrick Motorsports | Chevrolet | 203 | 42 |
| 4 | 11 | Denny Hamlin | Joe Gibbs Racing | Toyota | 203 | 41 |
| 5 | 48 | Jimmie Johnson (W) | Hendrick Motorsports | Chevrolet | 203 | 40 |
| 6 | 13 | Casey Mears | Germain Racing | Chevrolet | 203 | 39 |
| 7 | 15 | Clint Bowyer | Michael Waltrip Racing | Toyota | 203 | 37 |
| 8 | 78 | Martin Truex Jr. | Furniture Row Racing | Chevrolet | 203 | 37 |
| 9 | 5 | Kasey Kahne | Hendrick Motorsports | Chevrolet | 203 | 35 |
| 10 | 16 | Greg Biffle | Roush Fenway Racing | Ford | 203 | 35 |
| 11 | 38 | David Gilliland | Front Row Motorsports | Ford | 203 | 33 |
| 12 | 9 | Sam Hornish Jr. | Richard Petty Motorsports | Ford | 203 | 32 |
| 13 | 46 | Michael Annett | HScott Motorsports | Chevrolet | 203 | 32 |
| 14 | 3 | Austin Dillon | Richard Childress Racing | Chevrolet | 203 | 30 |
| 15 | 43 | Aric Almirola | Richard Petty Motorsports | Ford | 203 | 29 |
| 16 | 41 | Regan Smith | Stewart–Haas Racing | Chevrolet | 203 | 0 |
| 17 | 34 | David Ragan | Front Row Motorsports | Ford | 203 | 27 |
| 18 | 18 | Matt Crafton | Joe Gibbs Racing | Toyota | 203 | 0 |
| 19 | 83 | Johnny Sauter | BK Racing | Toyota | 203 | 0 |
| 20 | 47 | A. J. Allmendinger | JTG Daugherty Racing | Chevrolet | 203 | 25 |
| 21 | 10 | Danica Patrick | Stewart–Haas Racing | Chevrolet | 203 | 23 |
| 22 | 35 | Cole Whitt | Front Row Motorsports | Ford | 203 | 22 |
| 23 | 19 | Carl Edwards | Joe Gibbs Racing | Toyota | 203 | 22 |
| 24 | 32 | Bobby Labonte | Go FAS Racing | Ford | 203 | 20 |
| 25 | 27 | Paul Menard | Richard Childress Racing | Chevrolet | 203 | 19 |
| 26 | 55 | Michael Waltrip (W) | Michael Waltrip Racing | Toyota | 203 | 18 |
| 27 | 1 | Jamie McMurray (W) | Chip Ganassi Racing | Chevrolet | 203 | 17 |
| 28 | 33 | Ty Dillon | Hillman–Circle Sport | Chevrolet | 203 | 0 |
| 29 | 17 | Ricky Stenhouse Jr. | Roush Fenway Racing | Ford | 203 | 15 |
| 30 | 6 | Trevor Bayne (W) | Roush Fenway Racing | Ford | 203 | 14 |
| 31 | 95 | Michael McDowell | Leavine Family Racing | Ford | 203 | 13 |
| 32 | 44 | Reed Sorenson | Team XTREME Racing | Chevrolet | 203 | 12 |
| 33 | 24 | Jeff Gordon (W) | Hendrick Motorsports | Chevrolet | 203 | 13 |
| 34 | 42 | Kyle Larson | Chip Ganassi Racing | Chevrolet | 202 | 10 |
| 35 | 20 | Matt Kenseth (W) | Joe Gibbs Racing | Toyota | 202 | 9 |
| 36 | 66 | Mike Wallace | Premium Motorsports | Chevrolet | 199 | 8 |
| 37 | 51 | Justin Allgaier | HScott Motorsports | Chevrolet | 197 | 7 |
| 38 | 31 | Ryan Newman (W) | Richard Childress Racing | Chevrolet | 184 | 6 |
| 39 | 21 | Ryan Blaney | Wood Brothers Racing | Ford | 175 | 0 |
| 40 | 23 | J. J. Yeley | BK Racing | Toyota | 161 | 0 |
| 41 | 2 | Brad Keselowski | Team Penske | Ford | 160 | 3 |
| 42 | 14 | Tony Stewart | Stewart–Haas Racing | Chevrolet | 72 | 2 |
| 43 | 40 | Landon Cassill | Hillman Smith Motorsports | Chevrolet | 18 | 0 |

=== Race statistics ===
- 27 lead changes among 12 different drivers
- 7 cautions for 26 laps; 1 red flag for 6 minutes 42 seconds
- Time of race: 3 hours, 8 minutes, 2 seconds
- Average speed: 161.938 mph (260.614 km/h)
- Joey Logano took home $1,586,503 in winnings

Lap Leaders
| Laps | Leader |
|---|---|
| 1 | Jeff Gordon (W) |
| 2–13 | Jimmie Johnson (W) |
| 14–19 | Jeff Gordon (W) |
| 20 | J. J. Yeley |
| 21 | Michael Annett |
| 22 | Casey Mears |
| 23–45 | Jeff Gordon (W) |
| 46–51 | Joey Logano |
| 52–86 | Jeff Gordon (W) |
| 87 | Carl Edwards |
| 88 | Denny Hamlin |
| 89–107 | Jeff Gordon (W) |
| 108 | A. J. Allmendinger |
| 109–111 | Jeff Gordon (W) |
| 112 | Denny Hamlin |
| 113 | Joey Logano |
| 114–145 | Dale Earnhardt Jr. (W) |
| 146–153 | Joey Logano |
| 154–155 | Greg Biffle |
| 156–157 | Joey Logano |
| 158–165 | Jimmie Johnson (W) |
| 166–167 | Carl Edwards |
| 168–180 | Jimmie Johnson (W) |
| 181 | Joey Logano |
| 182–187 | Jimmie Johnson (W) |
| 188 | Martin Truex Jr. |
| 189–190 | Denny Hamlin |
| 191–203 | Joey Logano |

Total laps led
| Leader | Laps |
|---|---|
| Jeff Gordon (W) | 87 |
| Jimmie Johnson (W) | 39 |
| Dale Earnhardt Jr. (W) | 32 |
| Joey Logano | 31 |
| Denny Hamlin | 4 |
| Carl Edwards | 3 |
| Greg Biffle | 2 |
| Casey Mears | 1 |
| Martin Truex Jr. | 1 |
| Michael Annett | 1 |
| A. J. Allmendinger | 1 |
| J. J. Yeley | 1 |

==== Race awards ====
- Coors Light Pole Award: Jeff Gordon (44.711 secs., 201.293 mph (323.950 km/h))
- 3M Lap Leader: Jeff Gordon (87 Laps)
- Get Bioethanol Green Flag Restart Award: Sam Hornish Jr.
- Duralast Brakes "Brake in The Race" Award: Jeff Gordon
- Freescale "Wide Open": Joey Logano
- Ingersoll Rand Power Move: Michael Annett (16 positions)
- MAHLE Clevite Engine Builder of The Race: Roush-Yates Engines (#22)
- Mobil 1 Driver of The Race: Joey Logano (driver rating of 125.3)
- Moog Steering and Suspension Problem Solver of The Race: Casey Mears (crew chief Robert "Bootie" Barker, 0.112 seconds)
- NASCAR Sprint Cup Leader Bonus: No winner: rolls over to $20,000 at next event
- Sherwin-Williams Fastest Lap Award: Carl Edwards (Lap 133, 44.399, 202.707 mph (326.225 km/h))

== Media ==
=== Television ===
Since 2001 – with the exception of 2002, 2004 and 2006 – the Daytona 500 has been carried by Fox in the United States. The booth crew of longtime NASCAR lap-by-lap announcer Mike Joy, two-time Daytona 500 winning crew chief Larry McReynolds and 1989 race winner Darrell Waltrip has remained the same since the 2001 race. Pit road was manned by Jamie Little, Chris Neville, Vince Welch and Matt Yocum.

Fox Television
| Booth announcers | Pit reporters |
|---|---|
| Lap-by-lap: Mike Joy; Color-commentator: Larry McReynolds; Color commentator: Darrell Waltrip | Jamie Little; Chris Neville; Vince Welch; Matt Yocum |

=== Radio ===
The race was broadcast on radio by the Motor Racing Network and simulcasted on Sirius XM NASCAR Radio. MRN Radio has covered the Daytona 500 since 1970. Joe Moore, Jeff Striegle and Rusty Wallace covered the race from the booth. Longtime turn announcer – and prodigy of MRN co-founder Ken Squier – Dave Moody was the lead turn announcer. He called the Daytona 500 from atop the Sunoco tower outside the exit of turn 2 when the field was racing through turns 1 and 2. Mike Bagley worked the backstretch for the Daytona 500 from a spotter's stand on the inside of the track. Kyle Rickey called the Daytona 500 when the field was racing through turns 3 and 4 from the Sunoco tower outside the exit of turn 4. On pit road, MRN was manned by lead pit reporter and NASCAR Hall of Fame executive director Winston Kelley. He was joined on pit road by Steve Post and Alex Hayden.

MRN Radio
| Booth announcers | Turn announcers | Pit reporters |
|---|---|---|
| Lead announcer: Joe Moore; Announcer: Jeff Striegle; Announcer: Rusty Wallace | Turns 1 & 2: Dave Moody; Backstretch: Mike Bagley; Turns 3 & 4: Kyle Rickey | Alex Hayden; Winston Kelley; Steve Post |

== Standings after the race ==
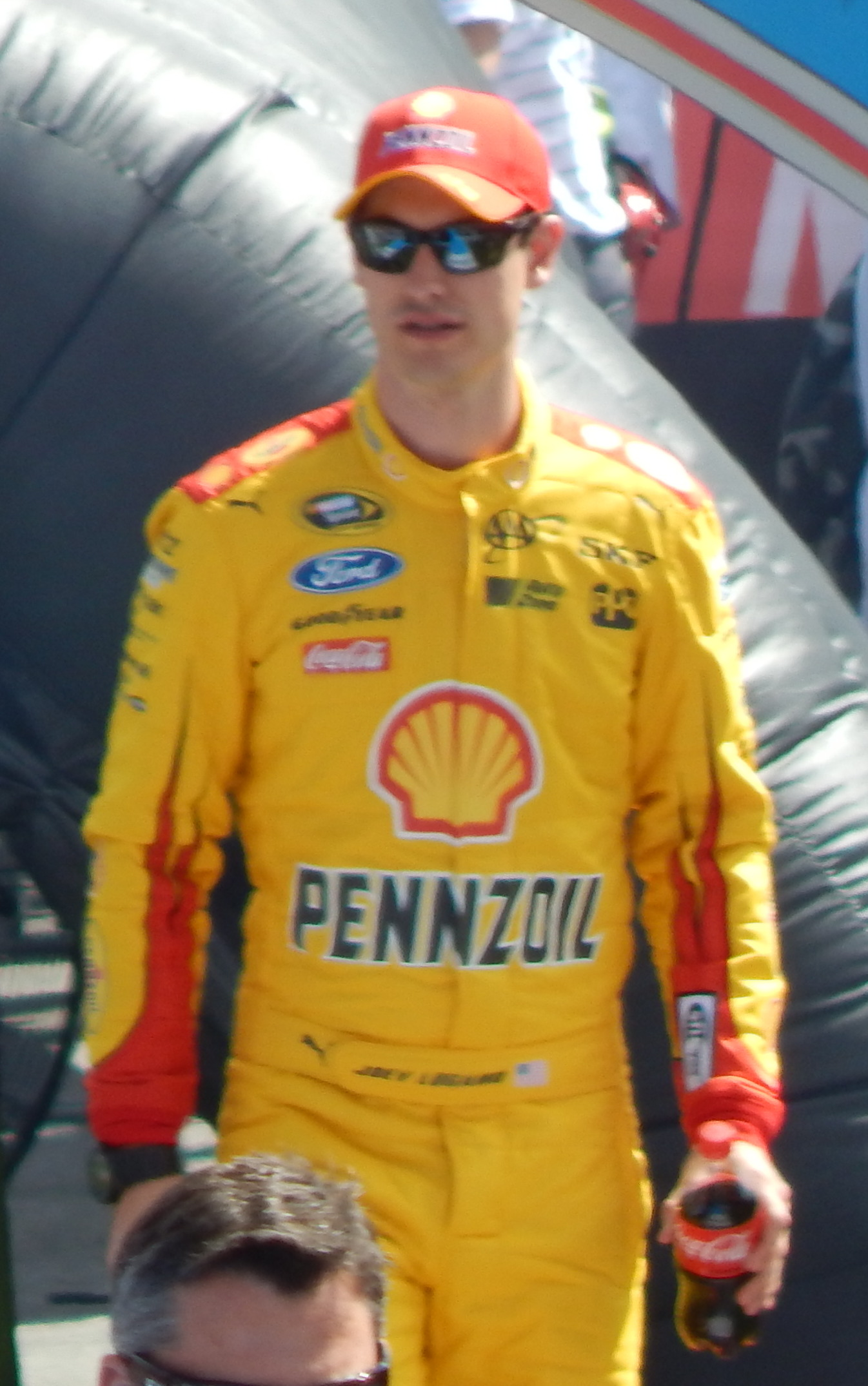
Joey Logano left Daytona International Speedway as the points leader for the first time in his career with a five–point lead over defending series champion Kevin Harvick.

Drivers' Championship standings

| Pos | Driver | Points |
|---|---|---|
| 1 | Joey Logano | 47 |
| 2 | Kevin Harvick | 42 (−5) |
| 3 | Dale Earnhardt Jr. | 42 (−5) |
| 4 | Denny Hamlin | 41 (−6) |
| 5 | Jimmie Johnson | 40 (−7) |
| 6 | Casey Mears | 39 (−8) |
| 7 | Clint Bowyer | 37 (−10) |
| 8 | Martin Truex Jr. | 37 (−10) |
| 9 | Kasey Kahne | 35 (−12) |
| 10 | Greg Biffle | 35 (−12) |
| 11 | David Gilliland | 33 (−14) |
| 12 | Sam Hornish Jr. | 32 (−15) |
| 13 | Michael Annett | 32 (−15) |
| 14 | Austin Dillon | 30 (−17) |
| 15 | Aric Almirola | 29 (−18) |
| 16 | David Ragan | 27 (−20) |

Manufacturers' Championship standings

| Pos | Manufacturer | Points |
|---|---|---|
| 1 | Ford | 47 |
| 2 | Chevrolet | 42 (−5) |
| 3 | Toyota | 41 (−6) |

- Note: Only the first sixteen positions are included for the driver standings.

== Notes ==
| Previous race: 2014 Ford EcoBoost 400 | Sprint Cup Series; 2015 season | Next race: 2015 Folds of Honor QuikTrip 500 |
