= Florida Hospital Oceanside =

- Adventist Health System

Geography
- Location: 264 S. Atlantic Avenue, Ormond Beach, Florida, United States
- Coordinates: 29°17′05″N 81°02′13″W

Organization
- Care system: Private hospital
- Type: General hospital
- Religious affiliation: Seventh-day Adventist Church

Services
- Beds: 80

History
- Former names: Ormond Beach Osteopathic Hospital; Peninsula Rehabilitation Medical Center; Atlantic Medical Center-Ormond Beach; Memorial Hospital Peninsula
- Constructed: 1955
- Opened: 1955
- Closed: September 2017
- Demolished: January 2019

Links
- Lists: Hospitals in Florida

Florida Hospital Oceanside was a rehabilitation hospital in Ormond Beach, Florida, United States. It became part of Adventist Health System following a merger with Memorial Health Systems in May 2000. Being located close to the coast, it was demolished in 2019 after being damaged by Hurricane Irma.

== History ==
In 1955, Ormond Beach Osteopathic Hospital was founded by the physicians John Hull Sr. and his son James G. Hull with 12 beds. In 1967, the hospital purchased a restaurant to the south to expand. In the late 1970s, it was named Peninsula Rehabilitation Medical Center.

In 1981, Southern Health Services in Atlanta purchased the hospital and then later Southern Health Services merged with Health Group Inc. in Nashville. In 1985, Paracelsus Healthcare Corporation in Pasadena, California purchased the hospital.

In 1996, Columbia Healthcare Corporation acquired the hospital buy trading for it. On May 15, 1998, Columbia/HCA Healthcare Corporation renamed the hospital to Atlantic Medical Center-Ormond Beach.

In late October 1999, Halifax Medical Center wanted to purchase both Atlantic Medical Center-Daytona and Atlantic Medical Center-Ormond Beach from Columbia/HCA Healthcare Corporation for $28 million. But they changed their mind after Memorial Health Systems Inc. complained to the Government of Florida antitrust regulators and the Federal government of the United States antitrust regulators. In early November, Memorial Health Systems purchased Atlantic Medical Center-Ormond Beach from Columbia/HCA for almost $13 million. Atlantic Medical Center-Ormond Beach was later renamed to Memorial Hospital Peninsula.

In late May 2000, Memorial Health Systems chose to merge with Adventist Health System. On October 1, Florida Hospital took over the management of Memorial Hospital Peninsula and it was rebranded to Florida Hospital Oceanside.

In early September 2012, renovations for Florida Hospital Oceanside were announced that would reconfigure the rehabilitation rooms on the second and third floors for patient privacy. In late April 2016, Florida Hospital Oceanside reopened for patients.

=== Hurricane damage and closure ===
In 2004, Florida Hospital Oceanside was closed for six months from damage caused by a hurricane. On October 5, 2016, Florida Hospital Oceanside evacuated patients due to Hurricane Matthew and the hospital was damaged by the storm.

On September 8, 2017, Florida Hospital Oceanside evacuated 31 patients by ambulance to Florida Hospital Memorial Medical Center due to Hurricane Irma. The storm caused wind and water damage, which caused the hospital to remain closed. In late February 2018, Florida Hospital asked the state to transfer the license of 40 rehabilitation beds to Florida Hospital Memorial Medical Center. In early March, the rehabilitation facility at Florida Hospital Oceanside officially moved to Florida Hospital Memorial Medical Center.

In August 2018, the city manager announced that Florida Hospital Oceanside would be demolished due to damage from multiple hurricanes, including Irma, and the discovery of asbestos in the structure. On October 22, Florida Hospital Oceanside went up for sale at $2.5 million. In late December, construction workers began putting a fence around Florida Hospital Oceanside. AdventHealth hired Cross Construction Services to demolish the hospital and keep recyclable materials from going into a landfill. On January 7, 2019, demolition began on Florida Hospital Oceanside. AdventHealth kept 2.44 acres (0.99 ha) from the site for future use.

In May 2022, Ormond Holdings LLC/Blackstream Development LLC purchased the vacant lot where Florida Hospital Oceanside stood for $2.05 million. Ormond Holdings LLC/Blackstream Development LLC wants to build 15 single-family homes on the former Florida Hospital Oceanside lot and also a parking lot for a Residence Inn by Marriott across the street.

== Charity giving ==
In early August 2017, Florida Hospital Oceanside donated stationery and medical supplies to the Jewish Federation of Volusia and Flagler County.

== Alleged fraud ==
In July 2014, a Walgreens pharmacist in Ormond Beach reported a case of prescription drug fraud to local police. A two-year criminal investigation was conducted by the Drug Enforcement Administration, Volusia County Sheriff's Office and the Ormond Beach Police Department into the claim. On February 7, 2017, an administrator from Florida Hospital Oceanside was arrested by the Drug Enforcement Administration close to his house in Ormond Beach for two felonies and put in the Volusia County Jail. In court, he was not convicted and the case was ordered sealed by the judge.
