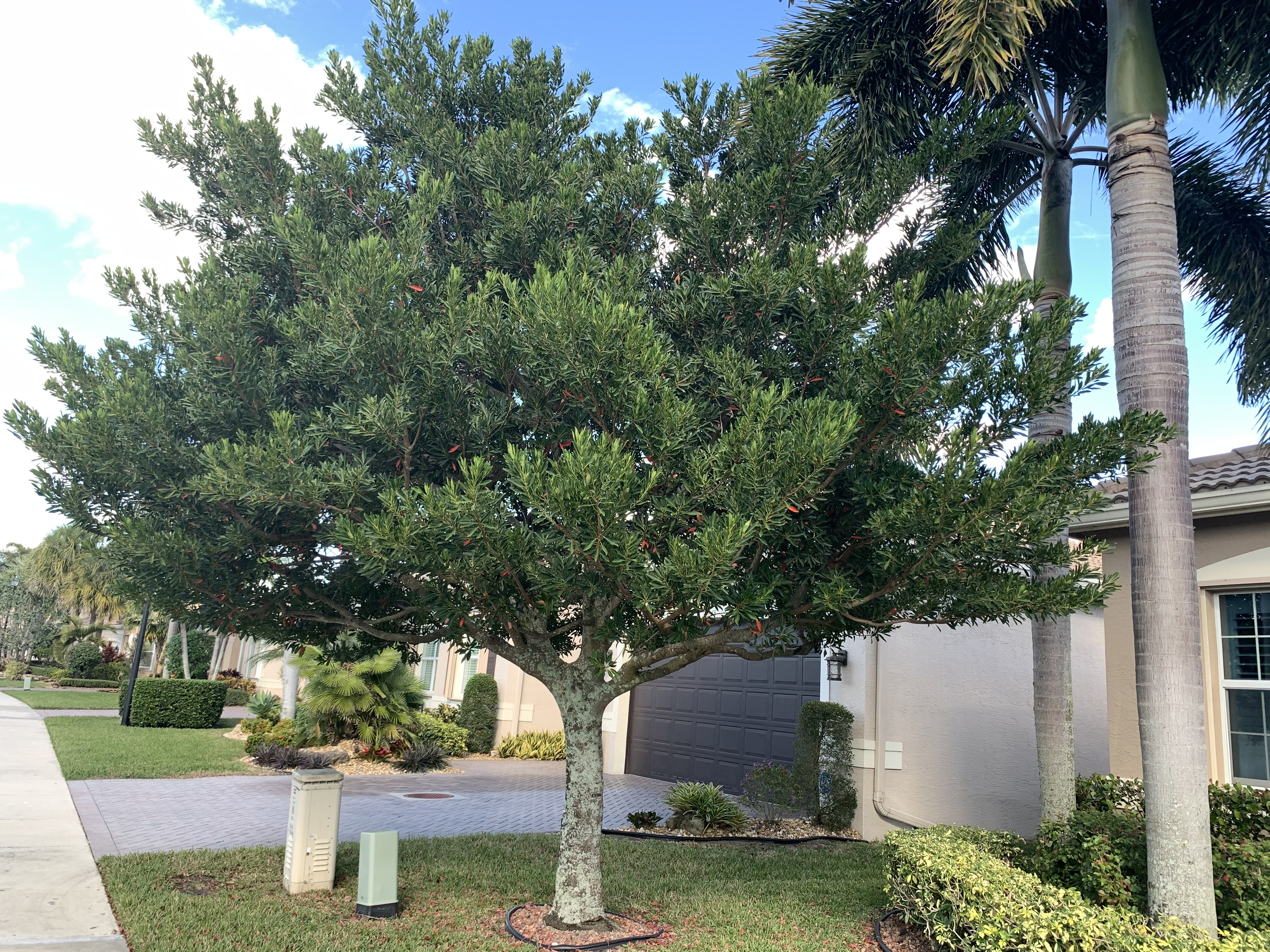

Scientific classification
- Kingdom: Plantae
- Clade: Embryophytes
- Clade: Tracheophytes
- Clade: Spermatophytes
- Clade: Angiosperms
- Clade: Eudicots
- Clade: Rosids
- Order: Oxalidales
- Family: Elaeocarpaceae
- Genus: Elaeocarpus
- Species: E. decipiens

Binomial name
- Elaeocarpus decipiens Hemsl. & F.B.Forbes

Subspecies
- Elaeocarpus decipiens var. changii; Elaeocarpus decipiens var. decipiens

= Elaeocarpus decipiens =

Species of flowering plant

Elaeocarpus decipiens, commonly known as Japanese blueberry tree, is a species of flowering tree in the family Elaeocarpaceae. It has red, brown, and green leaves that are typically egg-shaped, 5-petaled flowers ranging in color from cream to light pink, and small drupe fruit.

== Description ==
Elaeocarpus decipiens typically grows to 30 to 40 feet (9.1 to 12.2 m) in height. Flowers bloom from late spring to early summer. These flowers can be white, cream, and light pink. Flowers are typically one inch or less in size and are often hidden within the foliage. The fruits are olive-shaped drupe fruits that are dark blue to black in color. The fruit is inedible and is less than one inch long. The leaves are egg-shaped. New foliage tends to be more red, while older foliage is closer to green.

== Distribution and habitat ==
Elaeocarpus decipiens originates from East Asia. The native range includes Southern China, Vietnam, Japan, Korea, and Taiwan. The plant does well in USDA hardiness zones 8B to 10B and has a very high drought tolerance.
