= Halifax Health =

American hospital system

- Formerly: Halifax District Hospital, Halifax Hospital Medical Center
- Type: Safety net hospital
- Industry: Healthcare
- Founded: January 3, 1928; 98 years ago in Daytona Beach, Florida, U.S.
- Headquarters: 303 N. Clyde Morris Blvd., Daytona Beach, Florida, U.S.
- Number of locations: 3 hospitals, 2 freestanding ERs, 4 urgent care locations (2026)
- Area served: Volusia and Flagler Counties, Florida
- Key people: Jeff Feasel (President/CEO, 2005-present)
- Website: halifaxhealth.org

The Halifax Health logo

Halifax Health is a system of hospitals and professional centers in Volusia and Flagler counties in the U.S. state of Florida.

== History ==
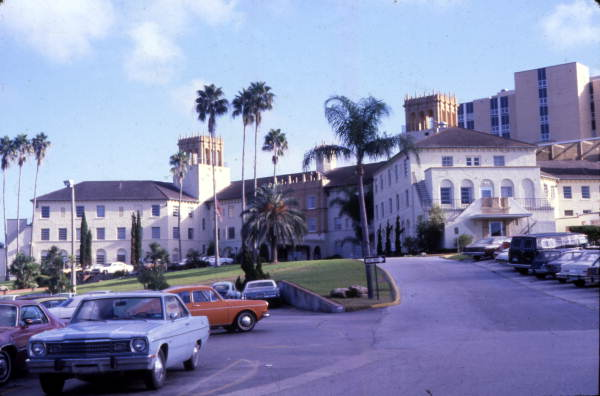
A photo of Halifax District Hospital in 1979.

On January 3, 1928, Halifax District Hospital opened in Daytona Beach, Florida as a safety net hospital and Special Taxing District. The hospital was established with 125 beds, including 40 private rooms, and was staffed by a 22-member nursing team.

In December 1942, during the height of World War II, the United States Army took control of Halifax District Hospital. The hospital was repurposed as a military infirmary to support wartime efforts. On the morning following the takeover, more than 30 patients were relocated to a temporary facility, the former Robert Wendell Hotel in Daytona Beach.

The Robert Wendell Hotel served as a temporary hospital for five years. In 1947, Halifax Hospital returned to its original location on Volusia Avenue (now West International Speedway Boulevard), where it continued to operate.

On February 18, 2001, Halifax Medical Center, a hospital operated by Halifax Health, was the site where Dale Earnhardt was pronounced dead after a fatal accident on the final lap of the 2001 Daytona 500. It was later determined that Earnhardt had died instantly due to a Basilar Skull Fracture.

== Medicare fraud ==
The US Department of Justice and the Office of Inspector General, U.S. Department of Health and Human Services sued the Halifax system for alleged violations of the Stark Law. The government claimed that Halifax's bonus structure deliberately improperly incentivized medical oncologists to refer Medicare patients to the hospital, and paid oncologists above-market rates. The case was initiated by a whistleblower who filed a complaint under the qui tam provisions of the False Claims Act. After the District Court for the Middle District of Florida ruled in favor of the government in November 2013, Halifax agreed to settle the claims with a payment of $85 million in March 2014.
