= Adventist Health =

US nonprofit integrated health system

Adventist Health System/West

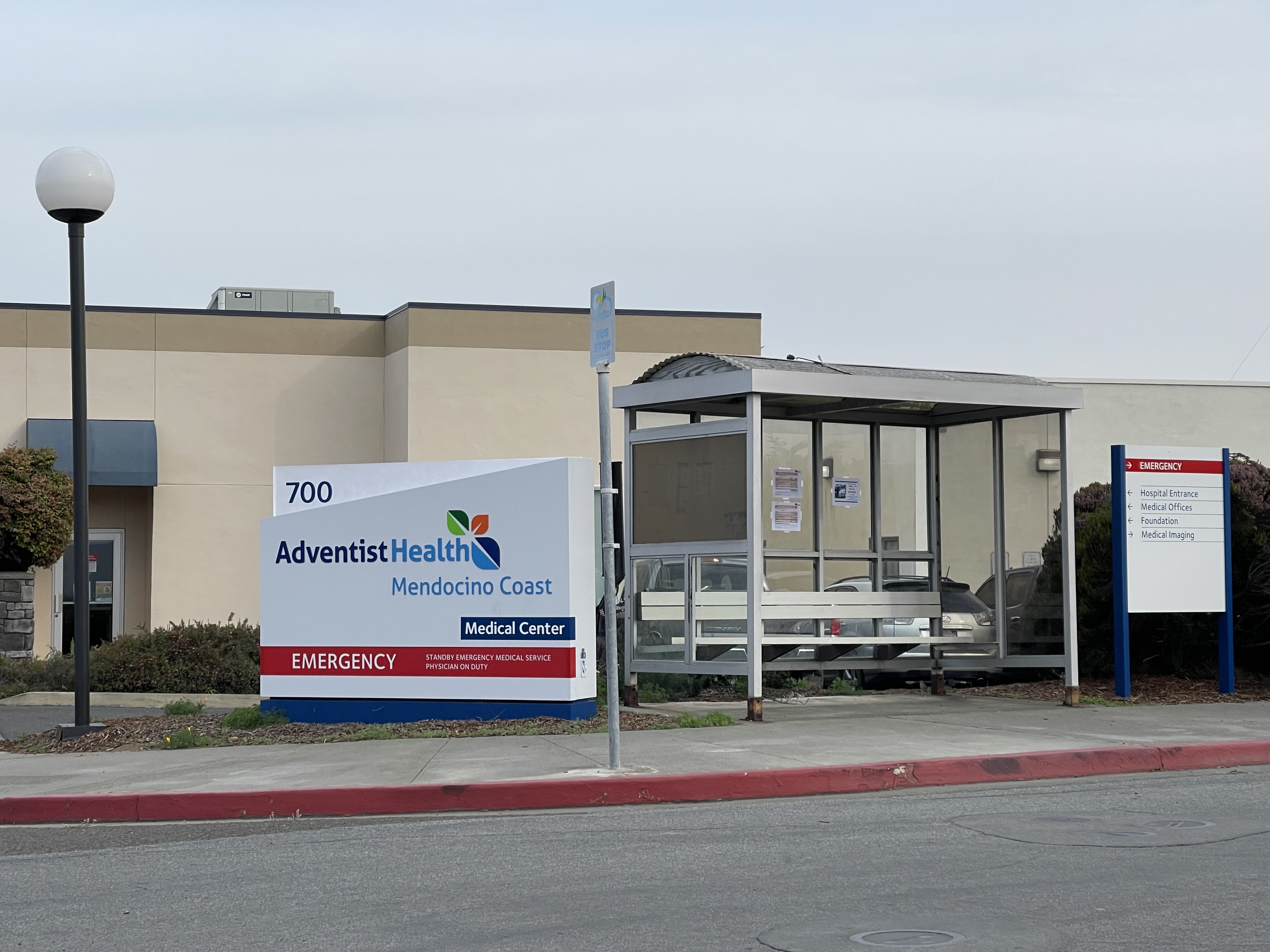
- Adventist Health Mendocino Coast in Fort Bragg, California
- Trade name: Adventist Health
- Type: Private 501(c)(3) nonprofit
- Industry: Healthcare administration
- Predecessors: Adventist Health Services, Inc.; Northwest Medical Foundation
- Founded: April 17, 1980 (46 years ago) in Los Angeles, California
- Headquarters: Roseville, California, U.S.
- Number of locations: 27 hospitals (2025)
- Areas served: California; Hawaii; Oregon
- Key people: Kerry L. Heinrich (CEO); Todd Hofheins (COO); John Beaman (CFO); Arby Nahapetian (CCO)
- Revenue: US$890.278 million (2024); US$924.528 million (2023)
- Net income: −US$78.441 million (2024); −US$11.789 million (2023)
- Total assets: US$5.014 billion (2024); US$3.557 billion (2023)
- Number of employees: 38,000 (2024)
- Rating: BBB+ (Fitch, August 2025)
- Website: www.adventisthealth.org

Adventist Health System/West, also known as Adventist Health System West, doing business as Adventist Health is a nonprofit organization affiliated with the Seventh-day Adventist Church headquartered in Roseville, California, that operates facilities in 3 states across the Western United States.

== History ==
In the 1960s, the church's General Conference transferred ownership of the hospitals in the United States to the local conferences. In 1972, the General Conference centralized the management of its healthcare facilities, creating Adventist Health Systems. The conferences then transferred the hospitals to the system, creating the entities Northwest Medical Foundation, and Adventist Health Services at the union level.

In 1980, they merged creating Adventist Health System/West, which changed its name to Adventist Health in 1995. The headquarters for Adventist Health was in Los Angeles, Adventist Health worried about the smaller hospitals being neglected, so the headquarters was moved to Roseville, California in 1982. In 2019, a new Roseville shared service center replaced the corporate office that opened in 1985.

In 2019, its headquarters was among six organizations awarded the Malcolm Baldrige National Quality Award for Performance Excellence.

In 2025, Adventist Health began offshoring 750 roles across IT, finance, HR, talent acquisition, and supply chain, while simultaneously implementing a return-to-office mandate affecting 800 employees.

On August 30, 2026, Adventist Health transitioned to EPIC at a cost of US$500M.

== Recognitions ==
- Ranked 186 by Fortune in its America's Most Innovative Companies list (2023) for innovation culture, process innovation and product innovation.

== Hospitals ==
Adventist Health operates twenty-seven hospitals, mostly in California:

Hospital	Beds	Location	Area served	Founded	Former names	Acquired
Adventist Health and Rideout	209	Marysville, California	Yuba County	1907	Rideout Memorial Hospital	2018
Adventist Health Bakersfield	253	Bakersfield, California	Kern County	1910	San Joaquin Community Hospital	1987
Adventist Health Castle	160	Kailua, Hawaii	Windward Oʻahu Island	1963	Castle Memorial Hospital; Castle Medical Center	―
Adventist Health Clear Lake	25	Clearlake, California	Eastern Lake County	1964	Redbud Community Hospital; St. Helena Hospital Clear Lake	1997
Adventist Health Columbia Gorge	49	The Dalles, Oregon	Wasco County	1901	Mid-Columbia Medical Center	2023
Adventist Health Delano	156	Delano, California	Northern Kern County	1974	Delano Regional Medical Center	2020
Adventist Health Glendale	515	Glendale, California	San Fernando Valley	1905	Glendale Sanitarium; Glendale Adventist Medical Center	1973
Adventist Health Hanford	235	Hanford, California	Kings County	1965	Hanford Community Medical Center; Central Valley General Hospital	2010
Adventist Health Howard Memorial	25	Willits, California	Northeastern Mendocino County	1928	Frank R. Howard Memorial Hospital	1986
Adventist Health Lodi Memorial	270	Lodi, California	Northern San Joaquin County	1952	Lodi Memorial Hospital	2015
Adventist Health Mendocino Coast	25	Fort Bragg, California	Coastal Mendocino County	1971	Mendocino Coast District Hospital	2020
Adventist Health Portland	302	Portland, Oregon	Portland-Vancouver metropolitan area	1893	Portland Sanitarium; Portland Adventist Sanitarium; Portland Adventist Medical Center	1973
Adventist Health Reedley	49	Reedley, California	Southern Fresno County and northern Tulare County	1962	Sierra Kings District Hospital	2011
Adventist Health Selma	57	Selma, California	Southern Fresno County	1908	Selma Sanitarium; Selma Community Hospital	1999
Adventist Health Sierra Vista	162	San Luis Obispo, California	San Luis Obispo County	1959	Sierra Vista Regional Medical Center	2024
Adventist Health Simi Valley	136	Simi Valley, California	Ventura County	1965	Simi Valley Community Hospital; Simi Valley Adventist Hospital	―
Adventist Health Sonora	152	Sonora, California	Tuolumne and Mariposa counties	1956	Sonora Community Hospital; Sonora Regional Medical Center	2017
Adventist Health Specialty Bakersfield	47	Bakersfield, California	Kern County	1995	Bakersfield Heart Hospital	2023
Adventist Health St. Helena	151	St. Helena, California	Napa County	1878	St. Helena Hospital	2017
Adventist Health Tehachapi Valley	25	Tehachapi, California	Tehachapi Valley	2018		―
Adventist Health Tillamook	25	Tillamook, Oregon	North Oregon Coast	1950		1973
Adventist Health Tulare	101	Tulare, California	Tulare County	1971	Tulare Regional Medical Center	2018
Adventist Health Twin Cities	122	Templeton, California	San Luis Obispo County	1977	Twin Cities Community Hospital	2024
Adventist Health Ukiah Valley	50	Ukiah, California	Ukiah Valley	1956	Hillside Hospital; Ukiah Valley Medical Center	1978
Adventist Health Vallejo	61	Vallejo, California	Napa and Solano counties	1963	California Specialty Hospital; St. Helena Hospital Center for Behavioral Health	2017
Adventist Health White Memorial	353	Los Angeles, California	Eastside and Boyle Heights neighborhoods	1913	White Memorial Medical Center; White Memorial Hospital	1963
Adventist Health White Memorial Montebello	202	Montebello, California	Gateway Cities	1942	Beverly Community Hospital	2023

=== Closed hospitals ===
- Fremont Memorial Hospital was a hospital in Yuba City, California, part of the Fremont-Rideout Health Group which later merged into Adventist Medical Group. The hospital was closed in 2017.
- Adventist Health Feather River was a 101-bed hospital in Paradise, California established in 1950 as Feather River Hospital. It was acquired by Adventist Health in 1973 and closed in 2018 after the facility was destroyed by the Camp Fire.

=== Divestiture ===
In Jan 2020, Adventist would manage Dameron Hospital in Stockton, CA. In 2024, it exited the arrangement due to poor financial performance.

== Mergers and acquisitions ==
On February 29, 2024, Adventist Health signed a definitive agreement to purchase Sierra Vista Regional Medical Center in San Luis Obispo, California and Twin Cities Community Hospital in Templeton, California for $550 million from Tenet Healthcare. On March 29, Adventist Health took over the management of the hospitals.

== See also ==
- Adventist Health International
- AdventHealth
- Adventist HealthCare
- Adventist Health Studies
- Kettering Health
- Loma Linda University Medical Center
- Adventist Health Arena
