= MCDH =

MCDH could refer to:

- Adventist Health Mendocino Coast, a hospital in California
- MKMCF Ma Chan Duen Hey Memorial College, a school in Hong Kong
