= Adventist HealthCare Shady Grove Medical Center =

Hospital in Rockville, Maryland, US

Coordinates: 39°05′55″N 77°11′56″W

- Adventist HealthCare

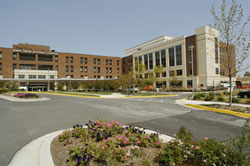

Geography
- Location: Rockville, Maryland, U.S.

Organisation
- Care system: Adventist HealthCare

Services
- Beds: 266

History
- Former name: Shady Grove Adventist Hospital (1979–2014)
- Founded: 1979

Links
- Website: adventisthealthcare.com/locations/profile/shady-grove-medical-center/
- Lists: Hospitals in U.S.

Adventist HealthCare Shady Grove Medical Center is a 266-licensed bed acute care facility located in Rockville, Maryland. Shady Grove Medical Center provides a range of health services to the community such as high-risk obstetrical care, cardiac and vascular care, oncology services, orthopedic care, surgical services and pediatric care. Opened in 1979 as Shady Grove Adventist Hospital, Shady Grove Medical Center operates as part of Adventist HealthCare, a health-care delivery system that includes hospitals, home health agencies and other health-care services. Adventist HealthCare is headquartered in Gaithersburg, Maryland.

John Sackett joined Shady Grove Medical Center as president in April 2013.

Shady Grove Medical Center is located within a 600-acre Life Sciences Center (LSC), which has Montgomery County's largest concentration of advanced technology companies including the hospital, Johns Hopkins University-Montgomery County Campus (JHU-MCC), the Universities at Shady Grove and biotechnology companies.

As part of the Shady Grove Life Sciences Campus, the hospital established a partnership in 2008 with the Universities at Shady Grove and Salisbury University to offer a bachelor's degree in respiratory therapy at the USG campus in Rockville. It also hosts nursing students from surrounding community colleges such as Montgomery College.

== History ==
When Shady Grove Adventist Hospital admitted its first patient in December 1979, it was located in a "rural" part of Montgomery County, surrounded by fields. With some 2,100 employees, 1,200 Medical Staff and Allied Health Professionals, and 350 to 380 volunteers per month, Shady Grove Adventist delivers more than 5,000 babies, treats more than 108,000 emergency patients at its main Rockville and Germantown emergency locations, and cares for more than 60,000 inpatients each year.

In 2001, a doctoral student committed suicide by hanging at the hospital.

In 2009, the hospital completed a four-year $100 million expansion and renovation project with an expanded NICU and new Pediatric Emergency Department and an expanded state-of-the-art Surgical Services area.

In October 2014, the hospital's name changed from Shady Grove Adventist Hospital to Adventist HealthCare Shady Grove Medical Center. The change was part of a branding initiative to emphasize the Adventist HealthCare system name and better reflect the facility's broad range of services.

== Medical services ==
The medical center provides medical and non-medical services for men, women and children. Medical services include pediatrics, bariatric surgery, cardiology, vascular, orthopedics, oncology, radiology, wound care, surgical services, special care services and emergency services.

=== The Birth Center ===
The Birth Center has private labor and delivery suites, private Mother-Baby suites, and a Level III Neonatal Intensive Care Unit (NICU). A Level III NICU provides pediatric medical subspecialists and surgical specialists who perform major surgeries for patients with congenital malformations or acquired conditions. A Level III NICU is designated for newborns with extreme prematurity, which is 28 weeks' gestation or less, or extremely low birth weight (1000g or less) or severe or complex illness. It is staffed by neonatologists and neonatal nurses.

In October 2008, Shady Grove Medical Center became the first hospital in the Washington D.C. metropolitan area to offer a Birth Advisor to aid expectant mothers in preparing for their upcoming birth experience. This free appointment with Kathy Schaaf, RN, Birth Advisor, allows expectant mothers a one-on-one discussion with an experienced Labor and Delivery nurse about their individual needs and expectations for their hospital stay.

=== Pediatrics ===
Shady Grove Medical Center operates the first Pediatric Emergency Department in Montgomery County staffed with fellowship-trained, Pediatric Emergency Physicians and Pediatric Intensivists 24 hours a day, 7 days a week.

=== Cardiac & Vascular Services ===
The hospital's heart care outcomes have earned it recognitions from across the state of Maryland and the nation by leading organizations that grant accreditations and awards based on quality. These include Designated Cardiac Interventional Center (CIC) by the Maryland Institute for Emergency Medical Services Systems (MIEMSS), Primary PCI Waiver grantee by the Maryland Healthcare Commission (MHCC), National Cardiovascular Data Registry (NCDR) ACTION Registry Get with the Guidelines (GWTG) Gold Performance Achievement Award and Mission: Lifeline Silver Performance Achievement Award by the American Heart Association (AHA).

In 2009, Shady Grove Medical Center was designated as a Cycle II Chest Pain Center, the only one in Montgomery County to earn this accreditation. In 2012, Shady Grove Medical Center obtained its Cycle III Chest Pain designation, one of only four hospitals in Maryland to achieve this.

Shady Grove Medical Center's board certified cardiologists, electrophysiologists, interventional radiologists and vascular surgeons provide the following cardiac and vascular care.

- ECG, holter monitoring, stress testing
- Vascular ultrasound
- Nuclear medicine
- Magnetic resonance anteriography (MRA)
- CT imaging
- Angiography
- Emergency and routine abdominal aortic aneurysm (AAA) stent graft
- Carotid stenting
- Arterial embolization
- Full spectrum of vascular surgery
- Comprehensive electrophysiology service
- Catheter ablation
- Pacemaker and defibrillator implants
- Enhanced external counterpulsation (EECP), the only hospital-based EECP Center in Montgomery County
- Monitored Cardiac Rehabilitation
- Unmonitored cardiac rehabilitation in the community
- Cardiac and Vascular center for Research
- Percutaneous coronary intervention (PCI)
- Primary PCI- an early life-saving medical procedure for heart attack patients since 1996
- Elective PCI- waiver from Maryland Healthcare Commission (MHCC)
- Annually performing on average, 100 PCI's with mean door-to-balloon (DTB) times in 75% nationwide

=== Cancer Care ===
The oncology program at Shady Grove Medical Center is one of 1,400 oncology programs in the country approved as a Community Hospital Comprehensive Cancer Program by the American College of Surgeons.

Inpatient cancer treatments include diagnosis, surgery, blood transfusions, antibiotic therapy, chemotherapy, pain management, sickle-cell crisis treatment, treatment for the side effects of cancer therapy. Inpatient care is provided on a dedicated oncology unit within the hospital.

Outpatient cancer treatments are offered at the Shady Grove Adventist Aquilino Cancer Center, located on the Shady Grove Medical Center campus.

Shady Grove Adventist Radiation Oncology Center is accredited by the American College of Radiology (ACR).[28] There are two locations for Shady Grove Adventist Radiation Oncology – in Rockville and in Germantown, which opened in March 2011 – offering Intensity Modulated Radiation Therapy (IMRT) and Prostate Seed Implants.[29] The Shady Grove Breast Center, opening in spring of 2012, is a partnership between Shady Grove Medical Center and Shady Grove Radiology. The center will provide enhanced breast health care, including imaging and breast cancer support services.

=== Surgical Services ===
Shady Grove Medical Center's 100,000-square-foot (9,300 m^{2}) Surgical Services Unit is equipped with 16 operating rooms, 22 pre-operation patient beds and 48 recovery beds.

Surgical services include: Abdominal, Neurosurgery, Bariatric, Oncology, Colon and Rectal, Ophthalmology, Cosmetic and Reconstructive, Orthopedic (including total joint replacement), Dental Surgery, Otolaryngology, Gastrointestinal, Sports Medicine, General Surgery, Thoracic, Gynecological, Urology and Metabolic Vascular.

Shady Grove Medical Center acquired the da Vinci surgical robot in 2011, offering the next level of minimally invasive surgery, which means smaller incisions, faster recovery times and less discomfort for patients.

=== The Joint Replacement Center ===
The Joint Replacement Center at Shady Grove Medical Center includes a joint replacement trained team on a dedicated orthopedic unit. The center offers total hip and knee replacement surgery, bilateral knee replacement surgery and partial knee replacement surgery.

In 2010, the Joint Replacement Center at Shady Grove Medical Center became the first hospital in Montgomery County to use the Hana table, which offers the anterior approach to hip surgery.

=== Sexual Abuse and Assault Center ===
The Forensic Medical Unit at Shady Grove Medical Center is Montgomery County's only sexual abuse and assault center. This unit is staffed with specially trained forensic nurse examiners who help victims of sexual violence receive compassionate and expert medical treatment for physical and mental injuries, and with forensic evidence collection.

== Shady Grove Adventist Aquilino Cancer Center ==
The Shady Grove Adventist Aquilino Cancer Center opened in September 2013 and is located on the Shady Grove Medical Center campus in Rockville, Md. The center is named after key donor and Montgomery County resident Michael Aquilino.

It provides outpatient clinical and support services for various types of cancer. Services include:

- Physician offices
- Chemotherapy and infusion
- Radiation therapy
- Pain and symptom management
- Cancer Navigation Team, which includes nurse navigators, an oncology dietitian and a social worker
- Clinical research
- Education and resource area
- Support groups
- Rehabilitation
- Nutrition counseling
- Complementary alternative medicine
- Fitness activities

The Shady Grove Adventist Aquilino Cancer is part of the Shady Grove Life Sciences Center and the Great Seneca Science Corridor in Rockville/Gaithersburg. This allows physicians to closely collaborate with local and national research organizations, which offers patients an opportunity to participate in clinical trials and research projects.

== Shady Grove Medical Center Emergency Center ==
The Shady Grove Adventist Emergency Center, is located in Germantown, Maryland, and serves residents in central and northern Montgomery County. It functions similarly to Shady Grove Medical Center's Emergency Department, but does not have inpatient beds. Patients who need to be admitted are transported by ambulance to Shady Grove Medical Center or other area hospitals. More than 36,000 patients receive emergency care at the Germantown emergency center each year.

The Center opened August 7, 2006, and is administratively and operationally a part of Shady Grove Medical Center.

The 24-hour facility expanded access to up-county residents of Montgomery County. Other health services on the Germantown campus include a primary care clinic and women's health clinic for low-income patients, an outpatient radiology center and physician offices.

== See also ==
- List of Seventh-day Adventist hospitals
- List of Seventh-day Adventist medical schools
