= AHMC =

AHMC may refer to:

- AHMC Healthcare, a California for-profit hospital management group
- Adventist Health Mendocino Coast, a coastal critical access hospital in Fort Bragg, California
- Al-Hayat Media Center, Islamic State propaganda organization
