= Adventist Health Bakersfield =

Hospital in Bakersfield, California, US

- Adventist Health

Geography
- Location: Bakersfield, California, California, United States
- Coordinates: 35.38342°N 119.02049°W

Organization
- Care system: Medicare/Medicaid/Charity/Public
- Type: General

Services
- Beds: 254

History
- Founded: 1910

Links
- Website: http://www.ahbakersfield.org
- Lists: Hospitals in California

Adventist Health Bakersfield is a 254-bed hospital in Bakersfield and serving Kern County, California. The medical campus is part of Adventist Health and previously was called San Joaquin Community Hospital.

== History ==
Margaret Quinn and Mary O’Donnell arrived in Bakersfield, California in 1905 to take up nursing duties at the St. Clair Hospital. Both were connected to the Order of the Sisters of Mercy and were trained as nurses. They saw a great need for an additional institution to care for the sick and injured in the area. Although both had a $500 nest egg, more funds were needed.

Miss Quinn — the businesswoman of the two — acquired a $6,000 donation from her family in the east and convinced two area businesses to co-sign a loan with her and Miss O’Donnel. Mr. Sol Mack, manager of the Bank of Bakersfield, co-signed for $5,000 and Mr. J. A. Huges, owner of the Huges Drug Store, co-signed for $2,500. Ms. Cora St. Clair also co-signed for an amount of $2,500. A quarter block site on 27th and Eye St. was purchased. Here a three-story building that would house 26 patients was constructed and named San Joaquin Hospital. Their first patient was admitted on October 6, 1910.

Miss Quinn took the responsibility of paying off the hospital's debt, buying additional land and enlarging the hospital. She doubled the size of the hospital by adding a new surgery, men's ward, women's ward and a kitchen.

In 1914, Miss Quinn bought out Miss O’Donnell and assumed duties of business manager, supervisor of nursing, surgery supervisor, anesthetist and laboratory technician. In 1920, she decided to sell SJCH due to her failing health. The hospital was incorporated and sold in equal shares to Drs. G.C. Sabichi, N.N. Brown, William P. Scott, George Buchner and F.A. Hamlin. Joseph Smith, MD later purchased the hospital and in 1964, requested that the Seventh-day Adventist Church manage the hospital. In August 1987, San Joaquin Hospital joined Adventist Health. Around this same time, the hospital added "Community" to its name.

In May 2007, San Joaquin Community Hospital (SJCH) opened a 130,000 sq, ft. patient tower. This five-story tower expanded its ICU, Emergency Center, and operating areas providing easier access with a new patient drop-off and loading area, tripled the size of the Maternity Care Center, and added a 9-bed Neonatal Intensive Care Unit. When the new tower was completed, the existing tower began being renovated to create private rooms for patients as well as meet the new seismic regulations.

The new tower provided SJCH with the resources to offer new services previously unavailable in Kern County. These services include opening the first Nationally Certified Stroke Center in the county in May 2008. To earn this distinction, SJCH's Stroke Center underwent an extensive, on-site evaluation by a team of The Joint Commission reviewers. The program was evaluated against The Joint Commission standards through an assessment of the program's processes, ability to evaluate and improve care within its own organization, and interviews with patients and staff.

The success of the Stroke Center became evident in late 2008 when the American Stroke Association presented SJCH with the Get With The Guidelines–Stroke(GWTG–Stroke) Bronze Performance Achievement Award, in 2009 with the Silver Plus Achievement Award, and in 2010 with both the Gold Silver Performance Achievement Award and Gold Silver Plus Performance Achievement Award. To achieve the Gold Award, the Stroke Center had to reach 85 percent or higher adherence to all stroke performance achievement indicators for at least 12 months. By achieving this standard, and having a compliance of 75 percent in at least six of 10 additional stroke quality measures during the same period, SJCH achieved the Plus Award. In 2013, the Stroke Center was awarded Target: Stroke Honor Roll status for reducing the time between hospital arrival and treatment. The award recognizes SJCH's commitment and success in implementing a higher standard of stroke care by ensuring that stroke patients receive treatment according to nationally accepted standards and recommendations, making it a Primary Stroke Receiving Center.

In 2008 SJCH made the announcement of a new partnership that would bring the Grossman Burn Centers (GBC) to Bakersfield. In June 2009, The Aera Burn Clinic (outpatient) of the Grossman Burn Center at SJCH opened; in September 2010, the inpatient ICU opened. With 41 percent of patients being children, the majority have been under the age of five, and most suffered from a scald injury occurring in the home.

In 2009, SJCH received accreditation from The Society of Chest Pain Centers as a Nationally Accredited Chest Pain Center. SJCH became the only hospital between Los Angeles and San Francisco to house a Nationally Certified Stroke Center and a Nationally Accredited Chest Pain Center under the same roof. In 2013, SJCH received the American Heart Association's Mission: Lifeline® Heart Attack Receiving Center Accreditation, as the first hospital in Kern County and the second in the state of California to be given this distinction. This means that the hospital met quality care measures for patients experiencing the most severe type of heart attacks, in which blood flow is completely blocked to a portion of the heart.

In late 2010, SJCH announced the purchase of Quest Imaging, an outpatient radiology facility providing Magnetic Resonance Imaging (MRI), Computed Tomography, Nuclear Medicine, Mammography and other imaging services. Quest Imaging originally was founded in 2002 by Dr. Donald Cornforth and Dr. Donald Fitzgerald, who perceived the need for a new outpatient center based on assessment of quality imaging services at that time and the continued, as well as projected, growth of the community. Slated to open in late 2014, a second Quest Imaging center will be opening in the heart of downtown Bakersfield. The center will be a comprehensive imaging facility, housing a breast center and all-digital services.

SJCH expanded its medical campus in May 2013, opening The AIS Cancer Center and Outpatient Surgery Center, directly across the street from the main hospital. The AIS Cancer Center includes radiation and medical oncology, a Varian trueBEAM Linear Accelerator with RapidArch technology, and is affiliated with the UC Davis Comprehensive Cancer Center.

Sharlet Briggs was named president and CEO of SJCH in November, 2016.

On July 5, 2017, San Joaquin Community Hospital officially changed its name to Adventist Health Bakersfield.

== Recognition ==
Adventist Health Bakersfield was recognized by Healthgrades with its America's 250 Best Hospital Award from 2022 to 2023.

== See also ==
- List of Seventh-day Adventist hospitals
