= Adventist HealthCare White Oak Medical Center =

Coordinates: 38°59′08″N 77°00′06″W

- Adventist HealthCare
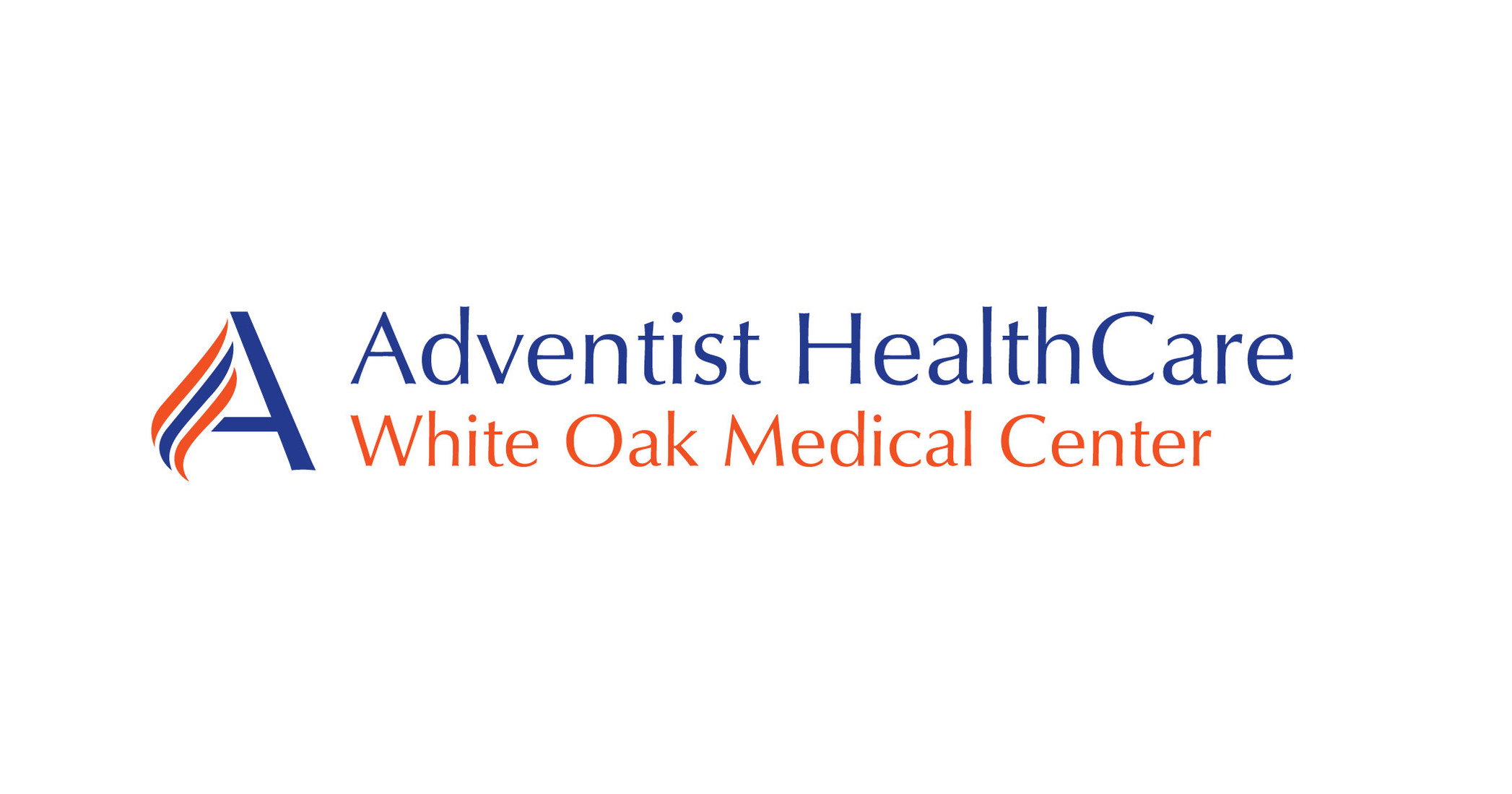

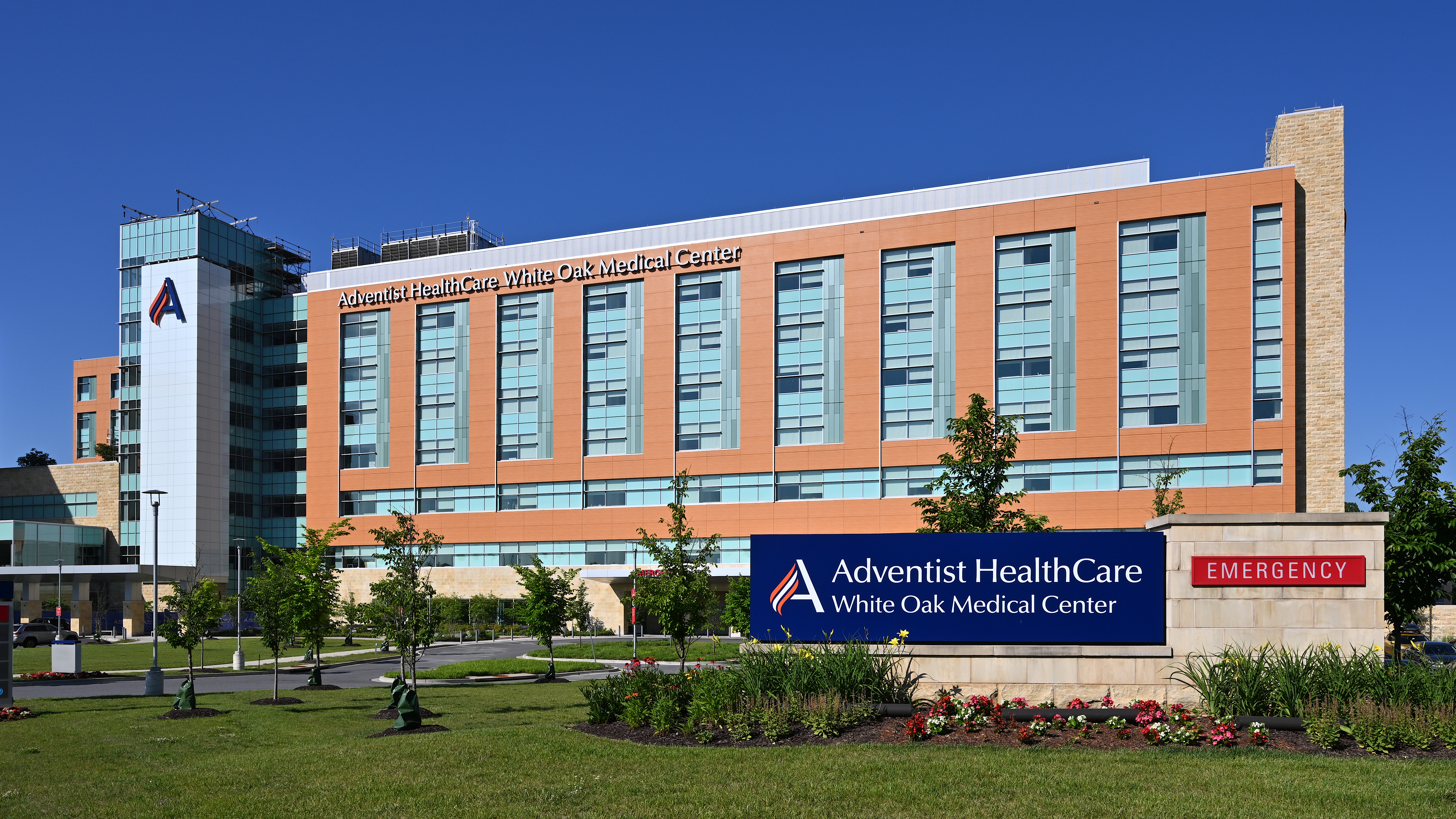

Geography
- Location: Silver Spring, Maryland, United States

Organization
- Care system: Adventist HealthCare

Services
- Emergency department: Accredited Chest Pain Center, Level III with PCI
- Beds: 180 beds

History
- Founded: June 13, 1907; 119 years ago (as Washington Sanitarium)

Links
- Website: adventisthealthcare.com/locations/profile/white-oak-medical-center/
- Lists: Hospitals in Maryland

Adventist HealthCare White Oak Medical Center is a hospital with 180 private patient rooms and serves patients in Montgomery, Prince George's, and surrounding counties.

Adventist HealthCare White Oak Medical Center operates as part of Adventist HealthCare, a health-care company that includes hospitals, home health agencies and other health care services. Adventist HealthCare is headquartered in Gaithersburg, Maryland.

The hospital partners with the Food and Drug Administration, also located in White Oak, to collaborate on health research and medical innovation. Adventist HealthCare White Oak Medical Center will maintain robust medical and health services at its Takoma Park location including behavioral health services, a primary care clinic, physician offices, rehabilitation services and a Federally Qualified Health Center operated by Community Clinic, Inc.

== History ==
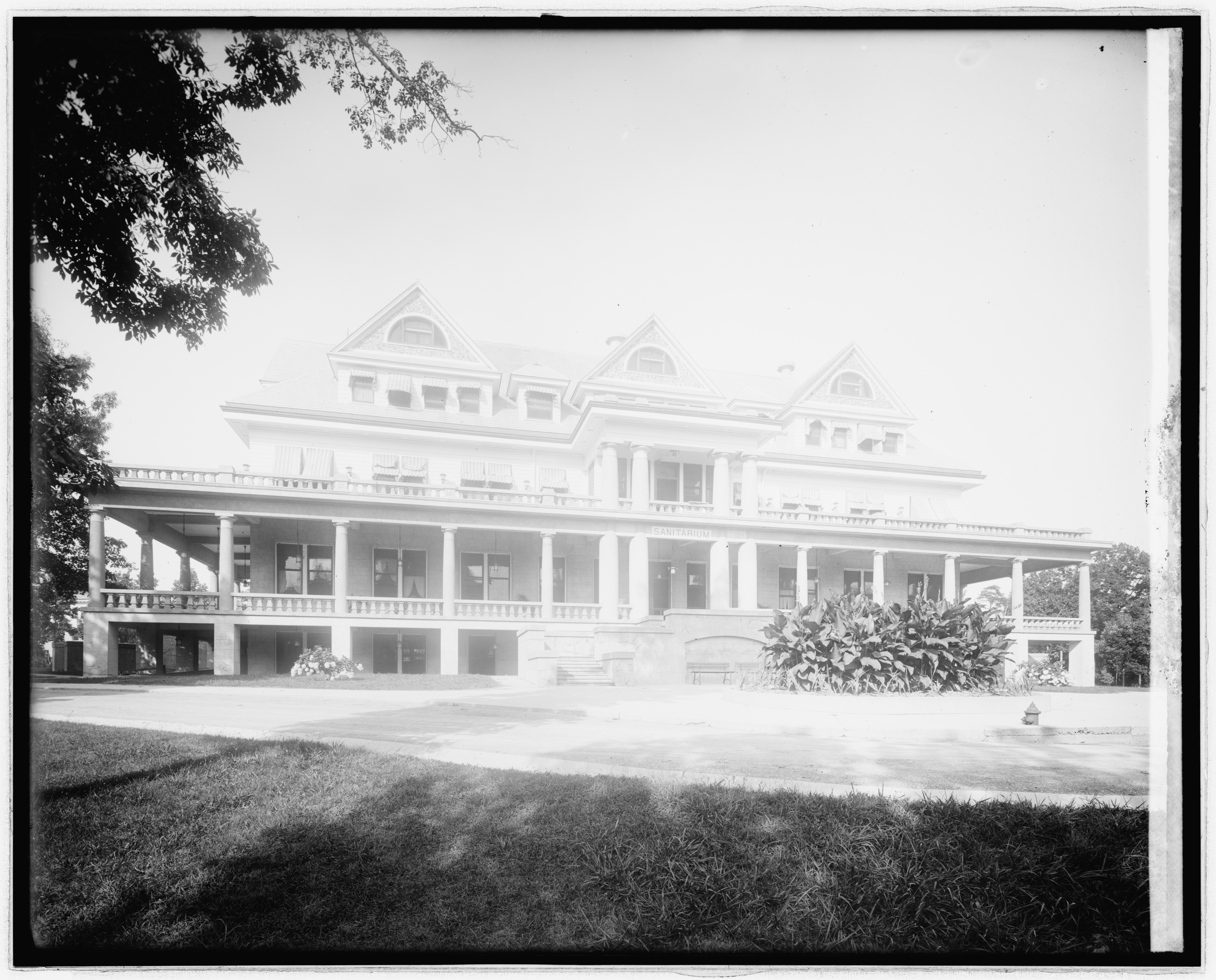
A photo of The Washington Sanitarium taken between 1910 and 1926.

When Washington Sanitarium first opened in 1907, it was Montgomery County's first cardiac center. Today, more than 400 open-heart surgeries and 5,000 interventional cardiology procedures are performed annually at the hospital.

The founding of Washington Sanitarium by the Seventh-day Adventist Church in 1907 was the beginning of the Adventist HealthCare system. After World War I, the Washington Sanitarium began its transition from a long-term to an acute-care facility. It changed its name to Washington Sanitarium and Hospital and added an acute-care hospital building for surgical, obstetric and emergency cases.

Next to the sanitarium, the Adventist Church built a college now called Washington Adventist University. The first group of nurses graduated from the hospital in 1909; nurses later received their training at the college, a program that will expand with the School of Health Professions, Science and Wellness, a partnership with Washington Adventist Hospital and Adventist HealthCare, to increase the number of health care professionals in Maryland.

Dr. Lauretta E. Kress, wife of the hospital's medical director, Dr. Daniel H. Kress, was the first female surgeon in Montgomery County. In 1916, she opened a maternity ward and during her hospital career delivered more than 5,000 babies. In 1940, the hospital added the Lisner wing; 10 years later, it added a six-story addition. A special procedures room was built in 1959 to study the heart, kidneys, brain and other organs. In 1962, the Intensive Care Unit, the second to operate in a metropolitan hospital, opened.

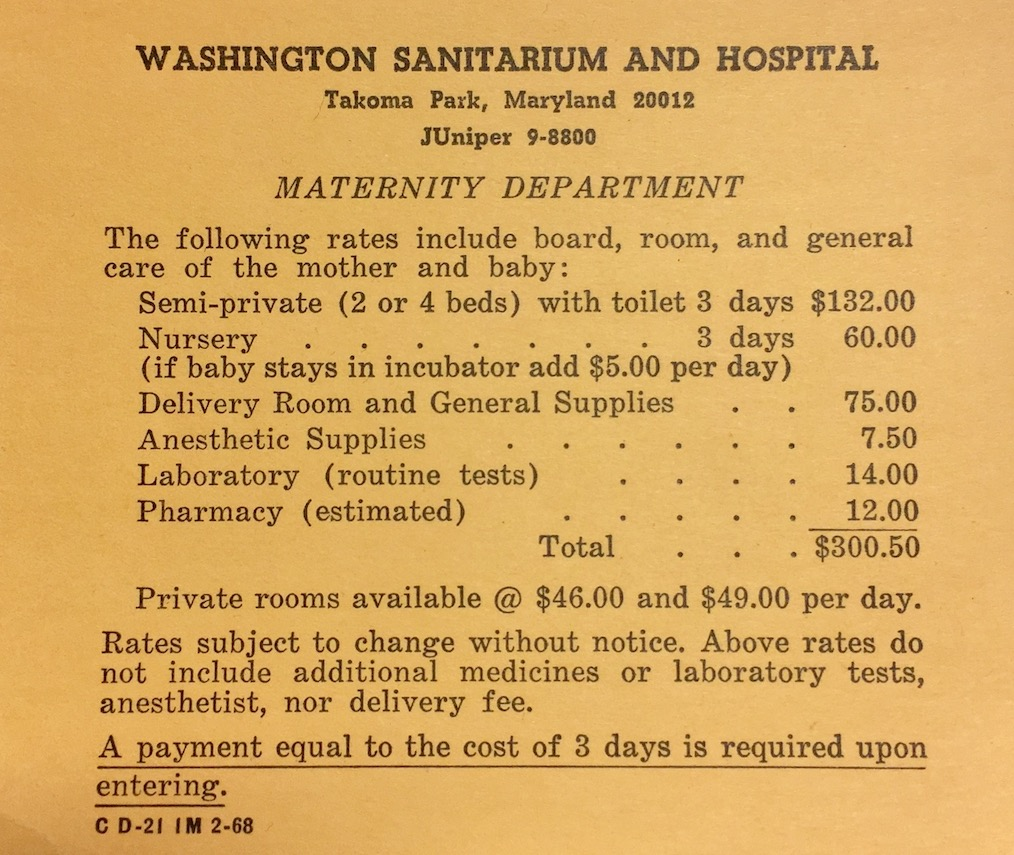
A Maternity Department Labor Rate Card from the Washington Sanitarium and Hospital from 1968

The hospital built a $14 million five-story wing and changed its name to Washington Adventist Hospital in 1973. Developments over the next decades included the opening of a Short Stay Surgery Unit in 1977 and a critical care modernization in the early 1990s. Washington Adventist Hospital opened the first Chest Pain Center in the D.C. area in 1992.

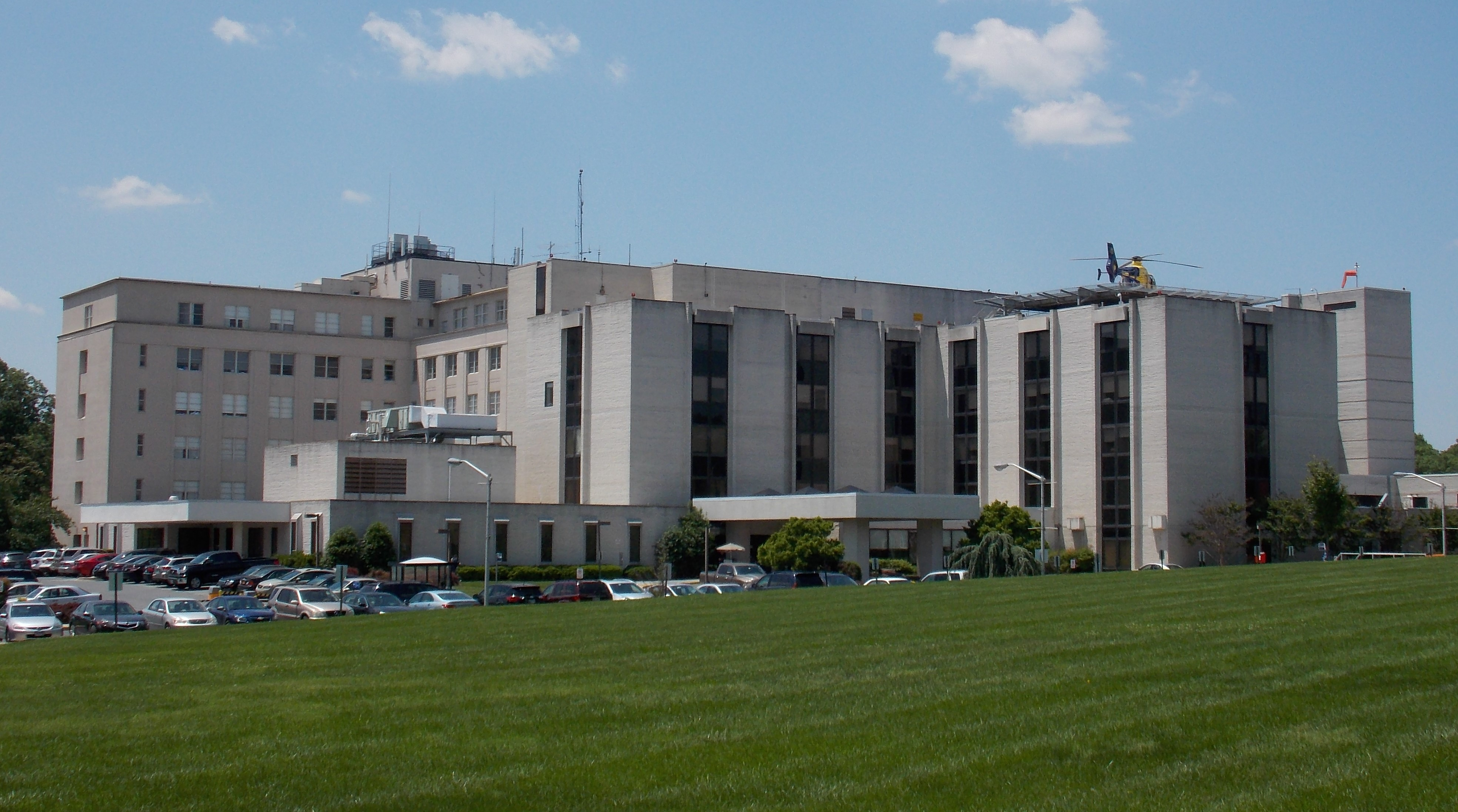
Former Adventist HealthCare Washington Adventist Hospital

In 2005, the hospital created a Vision for Expanded Access to address inequalities in access to health care. As part of the vision, Adventist HealthCare created the Center on Health Disparities

In October 2014, as part of a branding initiative to emphasize the Adventist HealthCare system name, the hospital's name changed from Washington Adventist Hospital to Adventist HealthCare Washington Adventist Hospital.

To ensure access to health care for the under-served in the community, Washington Adventist Hospital has partnered with several community organizations including the Mercy Health Clinic, Mary's Center for Maternal and Child Care and CASA de Maryland's Multicultural Center in Langley Park.

The Center on Health Disparities also works to train interpreters as Qualified Bilingual staff that are available to assist patients and their families who may not speak English, during a medical encounter.

In August 2019 Adventist HealthCare Washington Adventist Hospital changed its name and moved, when students and faculty from Howard University helped to move 76 patients and equipment to the newly built Adventist HealthCare White Oak Medical Center.

== Medical services ==
The hospital provides medical and non-medical services for men and women. Medical services include cardiology, maternity services, orthopedics, oncology, radiology, wound care, surgical services, special care services, and emergency services.

=== Cardiac and vascular services ===
Washington Adventist Hospital expanded its cardiac services in 2010, adding a new medical director of cardiac surgery and team of surgeons from Cardiac Vascular and Thoracic Surgery Associates (CVTSA) Washington Adventist Hospital was the first in the region to perform open-heart surgery and numerous cardiac procedures, including mitral valvuloplasty, and the first in the mid-Atlantic to perform a revolutionary type of surgery called Mini- Maze that can correct atrial fibrillation (AF), a common form of heart rhythm abnormality and a major cause of stroke.

Washington Adventist Hospital also claims to be a recognized leader in the transradial approach to cardiac catheterizations, which allows interventional cardiologists to use an artery in the wrist to gain access to heart arteries. In November 2013, the hospital became the first Transradial Catheterization Training Center in Maryland, allowing physicians from around the country to learn from Washington Adventist Hospital cardiologists how to perform this innovative, interventional heart procedure. Washington Adventist Hospital's board-certified cardiologists, electrophysiologists, interventional radiologists and cardiac and vascular surgeons provide the following cardiac and vascular care.

- ECG, holter monitoring, stress testing
- Vascular ultrasound
- Nuclear medicine
- Magnetic resonance arteriography (MRA)
- CT imaging
- Angiography
- Emergent and routine abdominal aortic aneurysm (AAA) stent graft
- Carotid stenting
- Arterial embolization
- Full spectrum of cardiac surgery
  - Bypass Surgery
  - Beating Heart Surgery
  - Aortic Valve Surgery
  - Mitral Valve Surgery
  - Tricuspid Valve Surgery
  - Thoracic Aortic Procedures
  - Atrial Fibrillation (Maze) Surgery
  - Endoscopic Vein Harvesting
  - Cardiac Tumor Registry
- Full spectrum of vascular surgery
- Comprehensive electrophysiology service
- Catheter ablation
- Pacemaker and defibrillator implants
- Monitored Cardiac Rehabilitation
- Cardiac and Vascular Research through the Center for Cardiac and Vascular Research (CCVR)
- Percutaneous coronary intervention (PCI)
- Primary PCI- an early life-saving medical procedure for heart attack patients

=== Center for Cardiac and Vascular Research ===
The Center for Cardiac & Vascular Research (CCVR) actively enrolls subjects in a variety of clinical research studies based on each subject's needs. CCVR is involved in cardiology clinical research trials that range from arrhythmia treatments, to heart failure therapies, to therapies for the treatment of angina and heart attacks. Patients have access to some therapies researched and developed by the hospital's physicians.

=== Cancer care ===
The oncology program at Washington Adventist Hospital is one of 1,400 oncology programs in the country accredited as a Community Hospital Comprehensive Cancer Program by the American College of Surgeons. Inpatient Cancer Treatments include diagnosis, surgery, blood transfusions, antibiotic therapy, chemotherapy, pain management, sickle-cell crisis treatment, treatment for the side effects of cancer therapy. Outpatient Cancer Treatments include blood and platelet transfusions, chemotherapy, blood Draws, IV hydration, Infusion of interferon, injection of growth factors such as neupogen and epogen. The Radiation Oncology Program at Washington Adventist Hospital was the first hospital-based facility in Montgomery and Prince Georges Counties and in the Washington Metropolitan area to be accredited by the American College of Radiation Oncology (ACRO). Other oncology services include Intensity Modulated Radiation Therapy (IMRT) and Partial Breast Irradiation.

=== Surgical services ===
Surgical services include: Cardiac and Vascular, Abdominal, Neurosurgery, Oncology, Colon and Rectal, Ophthalmology, Cosmetic and Reconstructive, Orthopedic (including total joint replacement), Dental Surgery, Otolaryngology, Gastrointestinal, General Surgery, Thoracic, Gynecological, Urology and Podiatry.

=== Orthopedic services ===
==== Joint program ====
The Joint Replacement Center at Washington Adventist Hospital provides a surgical team, including board-certified orthopedic surgeons, experienced in joint replacement.

Washington Adventist Hospital's joint program also offers education and preparation for patients as they anticipate joint replacement surgery and rehabilitation. Washington Adventist Hospital's physical and occupational therapists create a rehabilitation program to meet patients' individual needs.

== Designations, accreditations and awards ==
- Fully accredited by the Joint Commission and licensed by the State of Maryland Named Top Performer on Key Quality Measures by the Joint Commission
- Three-Star Rating for Heart Surgery by The Society of Thoracic Surgeons (STS)
- Accredited Chest Pain Center, Level IV with PCI, The Society of Cardiovascular Patient Care (SCPC)
- Silver Performance Achievement Award from the American College of Cardiology Foundation's NCDR ACTION Registry-Get With the Guidelines
- American Heart Association's Mission: Lifeline Bronze Performance Achievement Award
- Accredited Chest Pain Center, Level III with PCI, The Society of Chest Pain Centers (SCPC)
- Accredited Cancer Program with Commendation, The Commission on Cancer (CoC) of the American College of Surgeons (ACoS)
- Accredited Radiation Oncology Program, American College of Radiation Oncology (ACRO)

== See also ==
- List of Seventh-day Adventist hospitals
