= Adventist Health Sierra Vista =

- Adventist Health
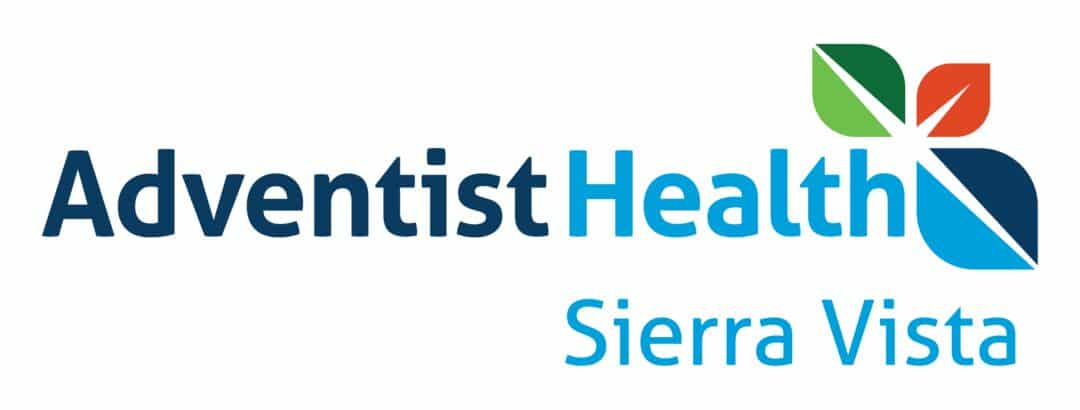

Geography
- Location: San Luis Obispo, California, United States
- Coordinates: 35.29175°N 120.66588°W

Organization
- Care system: Private hospital
- Type: General hospital
- Religious affiliation: Seventh-day Adventist Church

Services
- Emergency department: Level III trauma center
- Beds: 164

History
- Former name: Sierra Vista Regional Medical Center

Links
- Website: www.adventisthealth.org/system/locations/sierra-vista-regional-medical-center
- Lists: Hospitals in California

Adventist Health Sierra Vista is a non-profit hospital in San Luis Obispo, California, United States owned by Adventist Health. The hospital was purchased from Tenet Healthcare in February 2024.

== History ==
On February 29, 2024, Adventist Health signed a definitive agreement to purchase Sierra Vista Regional Medical Center and Twin Cities Community Hospital for $550 million from Tenet Healthcare. On March 29, Adventist Health took over the management of the hospitals and renamed Sierra Vista Regional Medical Center to Adventist Health Sierra Vista.

== Awards and recognitions ==
The hospital received a grade A from The Leapfrog Group from spring 2012 to April 2021.
