= Adventist HealthCare =

Non-profit health services organization based in Maryland, US

- Type: 501(c)(3) Nonprofit organization
- Industry: Healthcare
- Founded: 1907; 119 years ago
- Headquarters: Gaithersburg, Maryland, U.S.
- Area served: Washington metropolitan area, U.S.
- Key people: John Sackett, president
- Revenue: 953,989,583 United States dollar (2022)
- Total assets: 1,644,205,703 United States dollar (2022)
- Number of employees: 6,200
- Website: adventisthealthcare.com

Adventist HealthCare is a nonprofit organization based in Gaithersburg, Maryland that employs more than 6,000 people and provides healthcare for more than 400,000 individuals in the community each year. The primary service area for Adventist HealthCare is the Washington, D.C. metropolitan area.

== History ==
=== 20th century ===
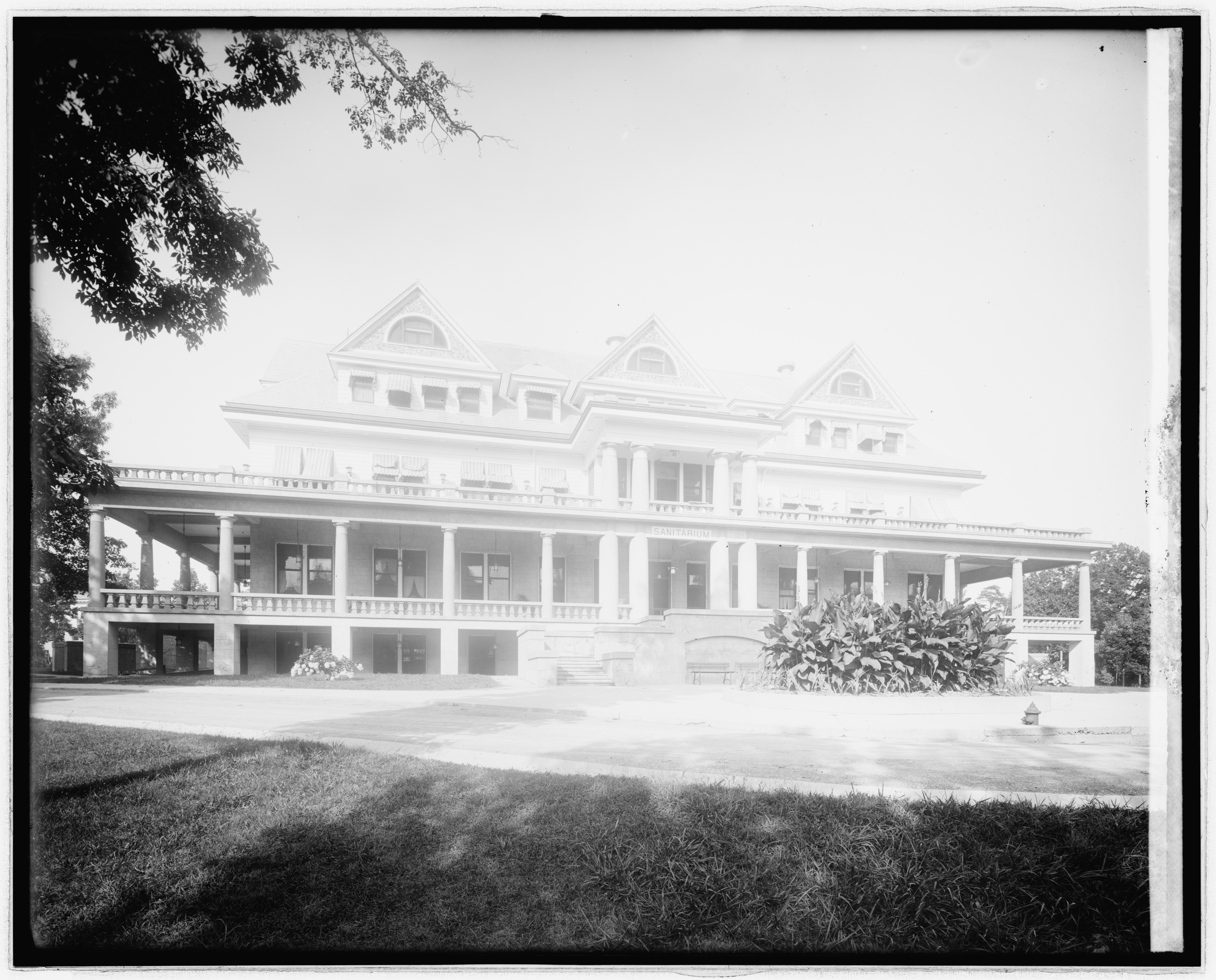
Photo of the Washington Sanitarium taken between 1910 and 1926

Adventist HealthCare began with the founding of Washington Sanitarium by the Seventh-day Adventist Church in 1907. The health facility treated illness and disease, and taught patients the benefits of exercise, a balanced diet, rest and fresh air.

Following World War I, the facility changed its name to the Washington Sanitarium and Hospital and added an acute care hospital building for surgical and emergency cases. Next to the Sanitarium, the Adventist Church built what is now Washington Adventist University. The first group of nurses graduated from the hospital in 1909; nurses later received their training at the college.

In 1973, Adventist HealthCare launched Adventist Home Care Services, which provides home nursing care to patients in their homes.

In December 1979, Shady Grove Adventist Hospital opened as the first hospital in northern Montgomery County, Maryland.

In 1997, Adventist HealthCare acquired Hackettstown Community Hospital, now known as Hackettstown Regional Medical Center, a community hospital based in Hackettstown, New Jersey and serving North Jersey.

=== 21st century ===
In 2016, Hackettstown joined Atlantic Health System in Morristown, New Jersey.

In 2000, Adventist HealthCare acquired Potomac Ridge Behavioral Health, a freestanding psychiatric hospital, which offers an array of inpatient, outpatient and partial hospital services for adolescents and adults. It includes the Reginald S. Lourie Center for Infants and Young Children, which was founded in 1983.

In 2001, Adventist HealthCare partnered with Kessler Rehabilitation Corporation to open the Kessler-Adventist Rehabilitation Hospital, a freestanding inpatient rehabilitation hospital now known as Adventist HealthCare Rehabilitation. The hospital is accredited by the Commission on Accreditation of Rehabilitation Facilities (CARF) International for care of hospitalized patients in four specialty areas — brain injury, spinal cord injury, stroke, and amputation.

In 2006, Adventist HealthCare opened the freestanding Adventist HealthCare Germantown Emergency Center in Germantown, Maryland. It provides the same full-service emergency medical care that patients can receive at a hospital emergency department in a convenient, stand-alone location just west of I-270 across from the Germantown Town Center on Rt. 118. Patients who need to be admitted are transferred to Adventist HealthCare Shady Grove Medical Center.

In October 2014, as part of a branding initiative to emphasize the Adventist HealthCare system name, Shady Grove Adventist Hospital was renamed Adventist HealthCare Shady Grove Medical Center and Washington Adventist Hospital was renamed Adventist HealthCare Washington Adventist Hospital. In 2015, both hospitals were named by the Joint Commission as "Top Performers on Key Quality Measures" for a third consecutive year.

In March 2015, Adventist HealthCare opened its first urgent care center in Rockville, Maryland, and announced plans to open two additional facilities in Germantown and Laurel in Maryland in 2016.

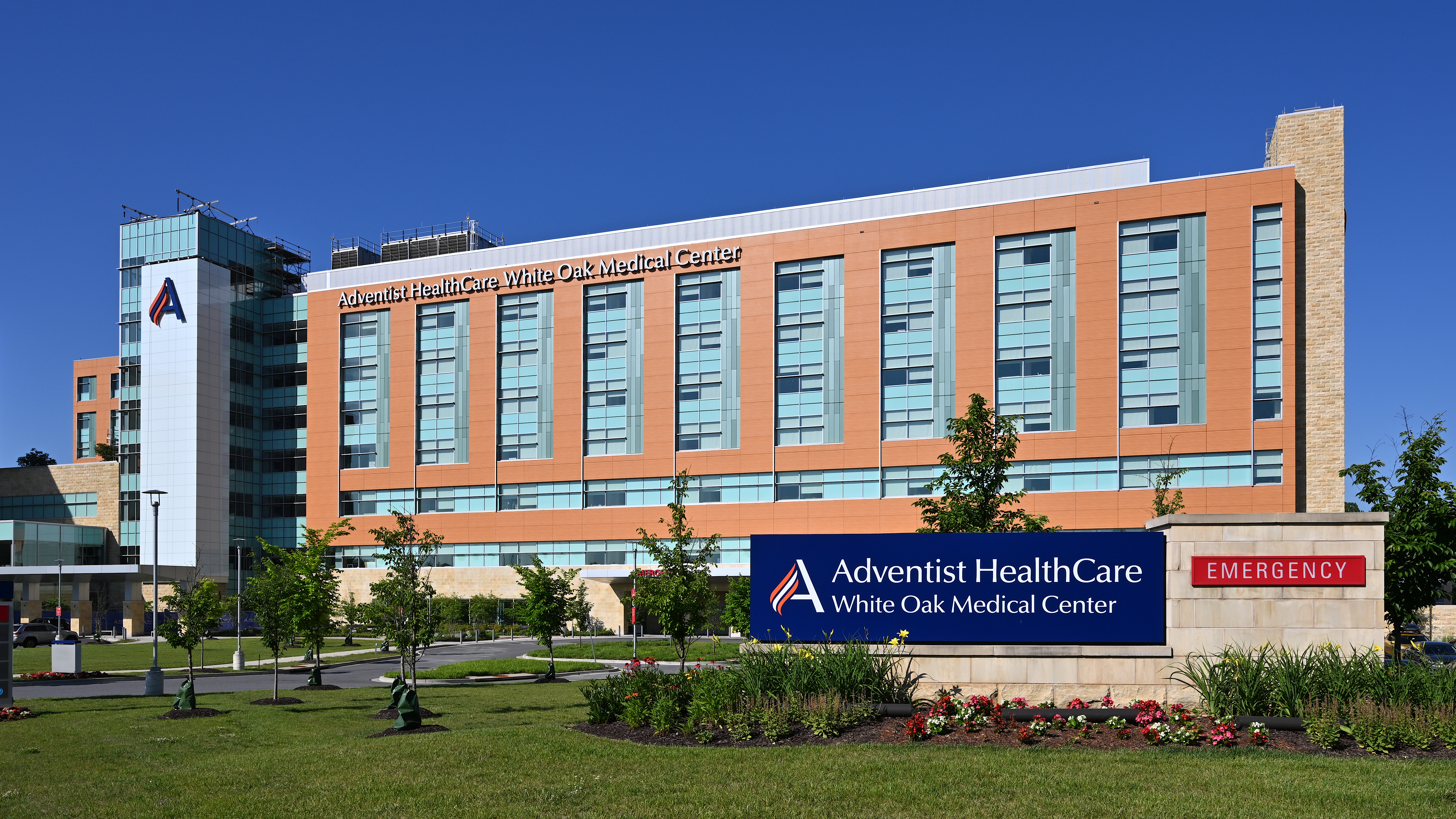
The Adventist HealthCare White Oak Medical Center

In December 2015, Adventist HealthCare received approval to relocate Adventist HealthCare Washington Adventist Hospital to the White Oak/Calverton area of Montgomery County. The move expanded access to care and strengthened the partnership between Washington Adventist Hospital and the Food and Drug Administration in collaborating on medical and scientific issues. The new hospital will be called Adventist HealthCare White Oak Medical Center and will open in the summer of 2019.

In March 2019, Adventist HealthCare Rehabilitation received approval for its White Oak Certificate of Need from the Maryland Health Care Commission, allowing Rehabilitation services to move to Adventist HealthCare White Oak Medical Center in 2020.

In July 2019, Adventist HealthCare and Nexus Health/Fort Washington Medical Center announced they signed an agreement to have Fort Washington Medical Center join Adventist HealthCare. Fort Washington Medical Center will continue to serve patients in Fort Washington, Oxon Hill, Temple Hills, and parts of southeast Washington D.C.

In August 2019, Adventist HealthCare Washington Adventist Hospital changed its name and moved after students and faculty from Howard University helped to move 76 patients and equipment to the newly built Adventist HealthCare White Oak Medical Center. Adventist HealthCare White Oak Medical Center features 180 all-private patient rooms and serves patients in Montgomery, Prince George's, and surrounding counties. Adventist HealthCare White Oak Medical Center is located at the center of the Life Sciences Gateway, neighbors with the Food and Drug Administration On August 26, 2019, a 24/7 Adventist HealthCare Urgent Care opened in the former Adventist HealthCare Washington Adventist Hospital Emergency Department.

In 2020, a Medical Pavilion opened in conjunction with Adventist HealthCare White Oak Medical Center. The Medical Pavilion houses physician offices, which eases access between physicians and patients.

In February 2020, Howard University Hospital and Adventist HealthCare signed an agreement, to have Adventist HealthCare manage the hospital for three years. Anita L. A. Jenkins, former president of Sycamore Medical Center, which is part of Kettering Health, would be the new chief executive of Howard University Hospital. On June 5, 2025, Adventist HealthCare announced that it would not be purchasing the hospital, and that the partnership would come to an end in February 2026.

== Community involvement and charity care ==
Adventist HealthCare is a faith-based organization that provides care to the community at large as well as to high-risk populations such as the uninsured and underserved. The organization avoids filing lawsuits against patients who are unable to repay medical expenses—to illustrate, Adventist provided $5.3 million of healthcare in 2008 that was ultimately unpaid. In addition to supporting programs for the underserved, Adventist HealthCare provides one of the highest percentages of community benefit out of all Montgomery County hospitals.

=== Adventist HealthCare Center for Health Equity and Wellness ===
An extension of Adventist HealthCare, the Center for Health Equity and Wellness was created in 2006 to raise community awareness about local health disparities, improve capacity to deliver population-based care, and develop solutions to eliminate local disparities in health care. To achieve these goals, the center focuses on education, services, and research. With their education initiative the center provides online and in-person training to health care professionals and staff. Through these classes they seek to increase cultural understanding and improve cross-cultural communication skills.

The center also provides services to the Montgomery County community. These include interpretation and translation for patients, as well as health and wellness programs such as health education classes, screening events, support groups and special events. Through a partnership with Mobile Medical Care, the center helps to improve access to primary and preventative care to patients around the county regardless of ability to pay.

The Center on Health Disparities conducts and supports research into the causes of and solutions to health disparities providing an annual report in conjunction with a health disparities conference and working with partners in research throughout the year.

Marcos Pesquera, executive director for the Center for Health Equity and Wellness, serves on the Maryland Health Quality and Cost Council and co-chaired by Maryland Lt. Gov. Anthony Brown on the health disparities workgroup.

=== Additional programs ===
Adventist HealthCare's ACES (Ambulatory Care Electronic Health Records Solutions) program offers affiliated outpatient assistance in implementing EHRs in their practices. Physicians and hospitals who implement an electronic health record and demonstrate effective use of the system are eligible for federal incentive payments under the Health Information Technology for Economic and Clinical Health Act (HITECH). ACES allows physicians to have a secure, electronic platform for patients to receive more coordinated medical care.

== See also ==
- Adventist Health International
- Adventist Health Studies
- Kettering Health
