= Adventist Health International =

- Abbreviation: AHI
- Formation: 1998
- Headquarters: Loma Linda, California
- President: Richard Hart, MD, DrPH
- Affiliations: Seventh-day Adventist Church
- Website: ahiglobal.org

Adventist Health International (AHI) is a multinational, nonprofit corporation with headquarters in Loma Linda, California. AHI was established to provide coordination, consultation, management, and technical assistance to hospitals and health care services operated by the Seventh-day Adventist Church, primarily in developing countries. AHI depends on various organizations, foundations, governments, and individuals to provide financial assistance when needed.

== Overview ==
AHI pursues policies and programs with concern for all aspects of development of health commits to the education of local health care professionals.

Established in 1998 with two hospitals— Gimbie Adventist Hospital in Ethiopia and Davis Memorial Hospital in Guyana — AHI has accepted one or two institutions per year into its expanding network. Hospitals are usually already Adventist church owned.

AHI currently manages 26 hospitals and 68 clinics in 22 countries, including Angola, Belize, Botswana, Chad, Curaçao, Ethiopia, Ghana, Guyana, Haiti, Honduras, Kenya, Lesotho, Liberia, Madagascar, Malawi, Mexico, Nepal, Nigeria, Puerto Rico, Rwanda, Senegal, Sierra Leone, Trinidad and Tobago, Venezuela, and Zimbabwe.

== See also ==
- Adventist Health
- Adventist HealthCare
- AdventHealth
- Adventist Health Studies
- Kettering Health
- List of Seventh-day Adventist hospitals
- List of Seventh-day Adventist medical schools
