= Adventist Health Feather River =

- Adventist Health
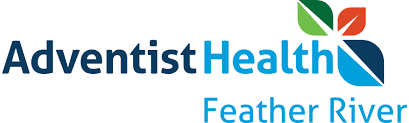

Geography
- Location: 5125 Skyway Road, Paradise, California, United States
- Coordinates: 39°45′24.95″N 121°34′17.05″W

Organization
- Care system: Private hospital
- Type: Community hospital

Services
- Emergency department: Closed
- Beds: 101

History
- Closed: Yes

Links
- Website: adventisthealth.org/feather-river/
- Lists: Hospitals in California

Adventist Health Feather River, also known as Feather River Hospital, was a 101-bed acute care hospital located in the town of Paradise, in Butte County, California, with a wide array of outpatient departments and services designed to meet the health care needs of Paradise, Magalia, and neighboring communities. It was severely damaged in the November 2018 Camp Fire and is currently closed.

== History ==
In 1946, Dr. Merritt C. Horning envisioned building a “total health center” in Paradise, California. Dr. Horning shared this vision with three of his colleagues: Dr. Dean Hoiland, Dr. C.C. Landis and Dr. Glenn Blackwelder. These men, along with other community leaders, purchased 35 acres (14 ha) from Paradise Irrigation District for the price of back taxes – $3,500. Within the next few years, additional acreage was acquired throughout several purchases, eventually totaling 182 acres (74 ha). Labor and building materials were largely acquired through donations and volunteers.

Construction was scheduled to begin in April 1948, however, at the time funding was not available to build surgical and obstetrical units. When applying to the State of California for an operating license, the hospital board learned that the hospital did not qualify for a license unless it had a surgical unit. Dr. Horning contacted a friend, the state director of public health, and soon a new hospital classification was created to accommodate the project. Within days, Feather River received a license to operate as an acute medical facility containing 18 beds and officially opened in 1950.

Feather River has experienced three “firsts” in their geographical region. It was the only hospital in the area to train nurse assistants; they pioneered the teen volunteer program of candystripers and handystripers, and the facility was the first public building in Butte County to prohibit smoking.

In 1952, a surgery unit was added and by the end of the decade, a new wing also had been completed. More space was soon needed, so in 1964 a new food service department and a physician's office building was added. Four years later, in 1968, the construction of a new 150-bed hospital was completed. This facility is located uphill from the original building which now houses the hospital's Health Center.

The hospital founders and trustees desired to ensure the facility's long-term mission as an Adventist health care center and so in 1960 they entrusted the hospital to the Northern California Conference of Seventh-day Adventists. On January 8, 1973, Feather River joined Adventist Health and became Adventist Health/Feather River Hospital. Feather River Hospital first closed in 2008, because of the Humboldt Fire. In 2017, the name was changed to Adventist Health Feather River.

On November 8, 2018, Adventist Health Feather River was partially destroyed by the Camp Fire. This fast moving wildfire propelled by high winds leveled a large portion of Paradise. This fire was the most destructive in California history.

=== Services ===
Before its closure, Feather River offered the following services: Behavioral medicine, treatment of cancer, cardiology, critical care medicine, diagnostic laboratory, emergency department, GI laboratory, home health, hospice, outpatient medical offices, home oxygen, medical imaging, obstetrics, rural health center, sleep medicine, surgery, and women's health.

In 1999, Feather River became the first hospital in Northern California to house an Endoscopy Suite complete with voice-activated, hands-free surgical equipment. It was one of only four hospitals in the region with an anticoagulation clinic and funded a wide range of preventive treatment programs.

=== Awards ===
In 2018 Adventist Health Feather River won the Women's Choice Award and has also won four awards from Healthgrades.

== 2018 Camp Fire and aftermath ==
On November 8, 2018, Adventist Health Feather River was forced to evacuate 60 patients after the fire climbed up from the adjoining canyon and jumped parking lots and a road going to the hospital. While some employees and patients huddled on the helicopter pad, another group was trapped in a tunnel under the hospital until they could escape. The patients were transported in ambulances, by helicopter and employee vehicles to Oroville Hospital, Enloe Medical Center, in Chico, and Orchard Hospital in Gridley that very day.

Surrounding hospitals stepped up to take care of the patients that would normally be going to Adventist Health Feather River, the largest business in Paradise, forcing 1,300 employees to be laid off or to relocate their employments to other hospitals and clinics in the area. Many employees left the state to find work. The buildings that survived the fire include the hospital, the cancer center, the emergency department, the maternity ward, the outpatient surgery center and one clinic. The buildings that were destroyed include offices, clinics, cardiology building, radiology building, and maintenance building.

In October 2019, people gathered together at Adventist Health Feather River after Senate Bill 156 was approved by the California State Legislature. This would allow the emergency room to operate without a hospital–the first in the history of the state of California.

== See also ==
- Feather River
