= Gary E. Fraser =

American cardiologist

- Occupation: Cardiologist

Gary E. Fraser is an American cardiologist and epidemiologist known for conducting research on plant-based dietary patterns and the Adventist Health Studies.

== Career ==
Fraser was born in Christchurch, New Zealand. He obtained his medical degree from Otago University in 1969 and a PhD in epidemiology from University of Auckland in 1978. He qualified FRACP.

Fraser is board certified in California in cardiovascular medicine and internal medicine. He is affiliated with Loma Linda University Medical Center and Jerry L. Pettis Memorial Veterans' Hospital and is a distinguished Professor at Loma Linda University School of Medicine.

For 32 years he was director of Adventist Health Studies at Loma Linda University. He is currently a lead investigator. He contributed to and managed the publications of Adventist Health Study-1 (AHS-1) and guided the development of Adventist Health Study-2 (AHS-2). He received the Distinguished Researcher Award from Loma Linda University.

In 2003, Fraser authored Diet, Life Expectancy, and Chronic Disease: Studies of Seventh-day Adventists and Other Vegetarians which examined the health effects of vegetarian lifestyles including Seventh-day Adventist vegetarians and non-Adventist vegetarians. In 2018, Fraser stated that research from the Adventist Health studies found that Adventist male vegetarians live an average of nine years longer and women six years longer compared to non-vegetarians.

Fraser has authored more than 100 scientific publications in peer-reviewed journals.

== Personal life ==
Fraser is a vegetarian. He is a Seventh-day Adventist and has authored articles for Adventist Review, Adventist Today and Ministry.

== Selected publications ==
- Preventive Cardiology (Oxford University Press, 1986)
- Diet, Life Expectancy, and Chronic Disease: Studies of Seventh-Day Adventists and Other Vegetarians (Oxford University Press, 2003)
- Vegetarian Diets in the Adventist Health Study 2: A Review of Initial Published Findings (with Michael J. Orlich, 2014)
- Vegetarian Epidemiology: Review and Discussion of Findings from Geographically Diverse Cohorts (2019)
