= Bakersfield Heart Hospital =

Adventist Health Specialty Bakersfield
- Cardiovascular Care Group

Geography
- Location: 3001 Sillect Ave, Bakersfield, California, United States
- Coordinates: 35°23′3″N 119°2′24″W

Organization
- Care system: Private
- Type: Cardiac Hospital, Total Joint Program, Stroke Center

Services
- Emergency department: Yes
- Beds: 47

Links
- Website: www.bakersfieldhearthospital.com
- Lists: Hospitals in California

Adventist Health Specialty Bakersfield is a hospital in Bakersfield, California, United States, specializing in the diagnosis and treatment of heart and vascular disease as well as a wide range of other medical and surgical procedures. The hospital also offers a full service emergency department, total joint program and accredited stroke center. With over 300 employees, the highly trained clinical and medical staff focus on patient-centered care. Adventist Health Specialty Bakersfield has over 20 of the leading cardiologists and cardiothoracic and vascular surgeons in Bakersfield.

== Accreditation ==
Adventist Health Specialty Bakersfield has received and maintained accreditation from The Joint Commission, the nation's leading hospital review board.

- Accredited Chest Pain Center – Society of Chest Pain Centers
- Accredited Stroke Center

== Awards ==
Adventist Health Specialty Bakersfield was rated by CareChex for 2013

- Top 10% in the Nation for Cardiac Care
- Top 10% in the State for Interventional Coronary Care
- Number 1 in the Market for Patient Satisfaction in: Overall Hospital Care, Major Cardiac Surgery, Heart Attack Treatment

== See also ==
- List of hospitals in California
