= MKMCF Ma Chan Duen Hey Memorial College =

Ma Kam Ming Charitable Foundation Ma Chan Duen Hey Memorial College
- 馬錦明慈善基金馬陳端喜紀念中學
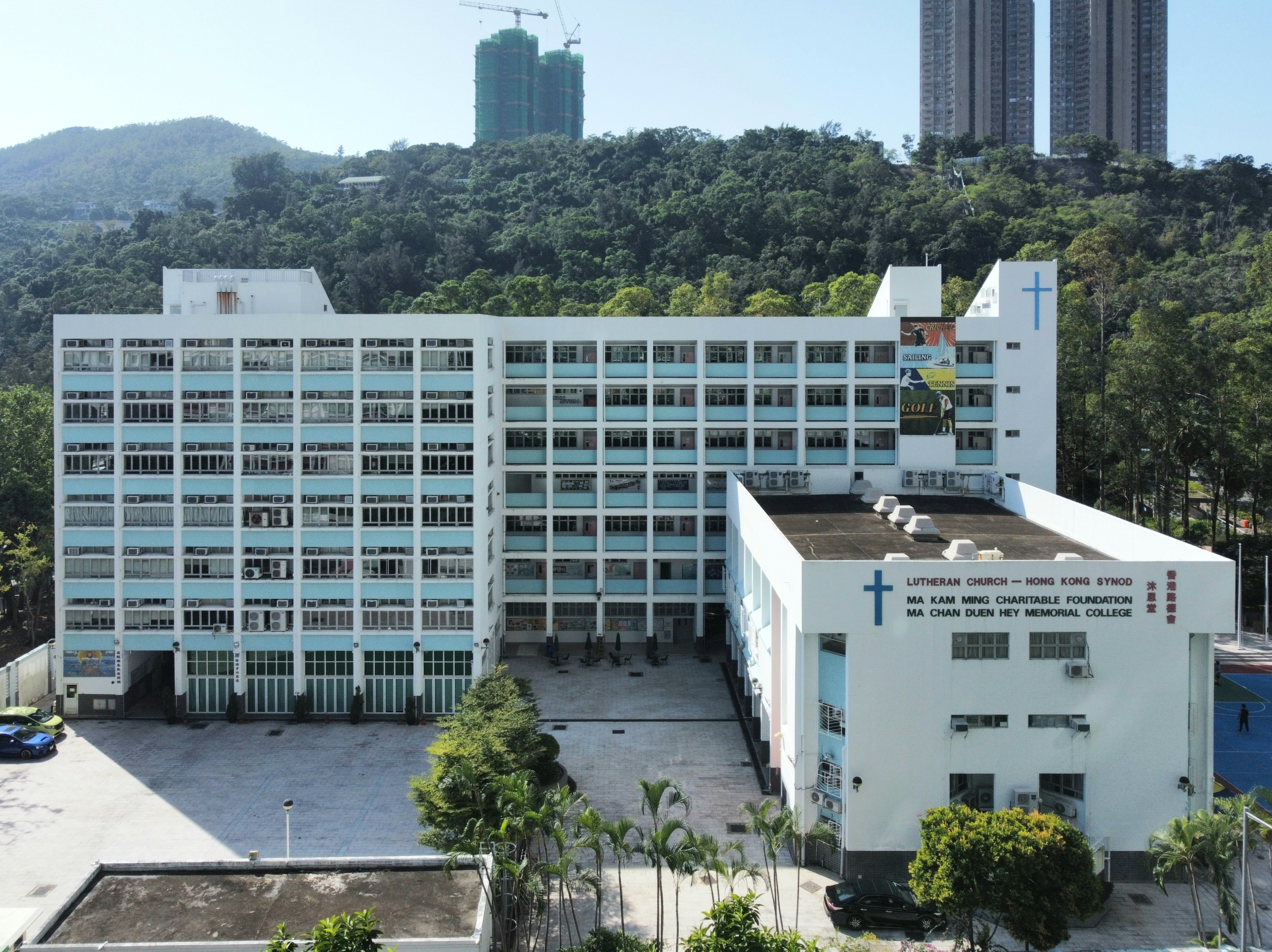

Location
- 2 Wan Lung Road, Tseung Kwan O
- Coordinates: 22.3198°N 114.2573°E

Information
- Type: Subsidy, secondary school
- Motto: Faith and wisdom Modest, Caring, Diligent, Honest
- Religious affiliation: Christian
- Established: 1998; 28 years ago
- School district: Sai Kung
- Grades: Secondary 1 - 6
- Houses: Modest House, Caring House, Diligent House, Honest House
- Affiliation: Hong Kong Lutheran Church Synod
- Website: mcdhmc.edu.hk

MKMCF Ma Chan Duen Hey Memorial College (MCDH), founded in 1998, a co-ed secondary school in Sai Kung District. MCDH is located at 2 Wan Lung Road in Tseung Kwan O, Hong Kong. It is using Chinese as the medium of instruction in junior classes and some senior classes.

== Organization ==
=== Houses ===
- Modest House
- Caring House
- Diligent House
- Honest House

=== Student Union ===
- 2011-12 Dynamic SU
- 2010-11 USH SU
- 2009-10 Obama SU
- 2008-09 WiFi SU
- 2007-08 Tens SU
- 2006-07 Twinkle SU
- 2005-06 ? SU
- 2004-05 ? SU

== School Hymn ==
M-C-D-H, Modest, Caring, Diligent, Honest and sharing. We pray God's blessing on our school and grant. His grace and mercy rule. A Christian core within our land. Strong under God's dear loving Hand. M-C-D-H, M-C-D-H, God's strength empowers on our way. God leads us to com-pass-ion true, Sharpens our vision fresh and new. M-C-D-H, M-C-D-H, God's love, Our gift toward endless day.

== Extra-curricular activities ==
=== Service Team ===
- Prefect Team
- Librarian
- Scout Troop / Venture Scout Unit (1072 Nd East Kowloon Group)
- Red Cross Youth Unit (Youth Unit 230)
- Boys' Brigade (113th Company)
- IT Prefect Team
- Football Team
- Badminton Team
- Rowing Team
- Track & Field Team
- Basketball Team
