= Adventist Health Studies =

Medical research projects involving Seventh-day Adventists

Adventist Health Studies (AHS) is a series of long-term medical research projects of Loma Linda University with the intent to measure the link between lifestyle, diet, disease and mortality of Seventh-day Adventists.

Seventh-day Adventists have a lower risk than other Americans of certain diseases, and many researchers hypothesize that this is due to dietary and other lifestyle habits. This provides a special opportunity to answer scientific questions about how diet and other health habits affect the risk of suffering from many chronic diseases.

Two studies on Adventist health involving 24,000 and 34,000 Californian Adventists were conducted over the last 40 years. Although not sponsored by the Adventist church itself, the church is supportive of the studies. These studies have been the subject of significant national media coverage on programs such as ABC News: World News Tonight, Good Morning America and in the National Geographic feature article "Longevity: The Secrets of a Long Life".

There is a third larger ongoing study that includes Adventists throughout the United States and Canada.

== Studies ==
=== Adventist Mortality Study ===
The first major study of Adventists began in 1960 and is known as the Adventist Mortality Study. It involved 22,940 California Adventists and included an intensive 5-year follow-up, along with a more informal 25-year follow-up.

"...[The] Adventist Mortality Study (1960–1965) did indicate that Adventist men lived 6.2 years longer than non-Adventist men in the concurrent American Cancer Society Study and Adventist women had a 3.7-year advantage over their counterparts. These statistics were based on life table analyses."

Specifically, comparing death rates of Adventist compared to other Californians:

- Death rates from all cancers were 40% lower for Adventist men and 24% lower for Adventist women
- Lung cancer 79% lower
- Colorectal cancer 38% lower
- Breast cancer 15% lower
- Coronary heart disease 34% lower for Adventist men, 2% lower for Adventist women

=== Adventist Health Study 1 (AHS-1) ===
An additional study (1974–1988) involved approximately 34,000 Californian Adventists over 25 years of age. Unlike the mortality study, the purpose was to find out which components of the Adventist lifestyle give protection against disease.

The data from the study have been studied for more than a decade and the findings are numerous – linking diet to cancer and coronary heart disease.

Specifically:

- On average, Adventist men live 7.3 years longer and Adventist women live 4.4 years longer than other Californians.
- Five simple health behaviors promoted by the Seventh-day Adventist Church for more than 100 years (not smoking, eating a plant-based diet, eating nuts several times per week, regular exercise, and maintaining normal body weight) increase life span up to 10 years.
- Reducing consumption of red and white meat was associated with a decrease of colon cancer.
- Eating legumes was protective against colon cancer.
- Eating nuts several times a week reduces the risk of heart attack by up to 50%.
- Eating whole meal bread instead of white bread reduced non-fatal heart attack risk by 45%.
- Drinking 5 or more glasses of water a day may reduce heart disease by 50%.
- Men who had a high consumption of tomatoes reduced their risk of prostate cancer by 40%.
- Drinking soy milk more than once daily may reduce prostate cancer by 70%.

=== Adventist Health Air Pollution Study (ASHMOG) ===
This is a sub-study of AHS-1. It began in 1976 and is still being conducted. It includes 6,328 Adventists from California. The study was funded by the Environmental Protection Agency.

The study linked the effects of various indoor and outdoor pollutants with respiratory diseases and lung cancer.

=== Adventist Health Study 2 (AHS-2) ===
The current study which began in 2002 with a goal of 125,000 Adventists continues to explore the links between lifestyle, diet, and disease among the broader base of Seventh-day Adventists in America and Canada. As of May 2006 it had an enrollment of 96,741.

Dr. Gary E. Fraser with a team of researchers from the School of Public Health at Loma Linda University is conducting the study, which is funded by the National Cancer Institute. In July 2011, the National Institutes of Health awarded AHS-2 a $5.5 million 5-year grant to continue the study.

While the study is ongoing, some findings have been reported:

- "The 5-unit BMI difference between vegans and nonvegetarians indicates a substantial potential of vegetarianism to protect against obesity. Increased conformity to vegetarian diets protected against risk of type 2 diabetes after lifestyle characteristics and BMI were taken into account. Pesco- and semi-vegetarian diets afforded intermediate protection."
- "A vegetarian dietary pattern is associated with a more favorable profile of MRFs and a lower risk of MetS."
- "Men with higher intake of dairy foods, but not nondairy calcium, had a higher risk of prostate cancer compared with men having lower intakes. Associations were nonlinear, suggesting the greatest increases in risk at relatively low doses."

=== Adventist Religion & Health Study (AHRS) ===
This sub-study of AHS-2 began in 2006 and is funded by the National Institute on Aging. It is also known as the Biopsychosocial Religion and Health Study (BRHS).

The study has exceeded its goal of 10,000 participants with 11,835 subjects as of 2008.

== See also ==
- Adventist Health International
