= Adventist Health Mendocino Coast =

Hospital in Fort Bragg, California, US

Coordinates: 39°25′54″N 123°48′01″W

Adventist Health Mendocino Coast (AHMC), formerly known as Mendocino Coast District Hospital (MCDH) is a critical access hospital in Fort Bragg, California, located along the coastal California State Route 1.

== History ==
The hospital was founded on June 26, 1971.

The hospital began facing financial difficulties in 2002 after the town's largest commercial employer, Georgia-Pacific shut down its lumber mill. In 2012, the hospital declared bankruptcy.

On July 1, 2019, the hospital abandoned its MEDITECH Expanse electronic health record software upgrade after spending US$4 (equivalent to $5.04 in 2025) million due to cost overruns.

On July 1, 2020, Mendocino Coast District Hospital signed a 30-year operations agreement with Adventist Health. The hospital's labor and delivery unit was closed following the partnership with Adventist Health after births fell from a high of 250 babies annually in the 1980s to 50 in 2021 with patients opting traveling to Ukiah to deliver.

On December 1, 2022, the hospital completed a $15 million transition to the new Cerner EHR from Meditech funded by Adventist Health.

On October 4, 2024, Adventist Health notified the hospital that it would restructure its operations lease due to improve returns.

== Patient population ==
Approximately 80% of patient's at the hospital are covered under Medicare and Medicaid.

== Board ==
The hospital is owned by the Mendocino Coast Health Care District Board. Following the 2020 partnership with Adventist health, the board no longer has oversight of operations.

In 2024, a grand jury investigation of the board found numerous issues including that board members lacked relevant experience, a lack of minutes or audits for over a year, and the storage of funds in non-interest bearing accounts that were not FDIC insured and had excessive fees.
