= Flagler County Emergency Management =

American county government agency

Agency overview
- Formed: 1988
- Jurisdiction: Flagler County, Florida
- Headquarters: Bunnell, Florida
- Agency executive: Jonathan Lord, Emergency Management Director
- Parent agency: Flagler County Board of County Commissioners
- Website: https://www.flaglercounty.gov/emergency

Flagler County Emergency Management (FCEM) is the local government agency responsible for disaster mitigation, preparedness, response, and recovery in Flagler County, Florida. Established in 1962 as Civil Defense, with the modern Emergency Management designation adopted in 1995. The agency's organizational structure has changed several times, transitioning from Civil Defense to the Emergency Management department in the mid 1900s, then operating as a division under the Emergency services department from 1999 to 2008, before being restored as a standalone Emergency Management department. The department operates under the legal authority of Chapter 12 of the Flagler County Code of Ordinances and Florida Statutes Chapter 252, which designate the Emergency Management Director as the official responsible for countywide emergency operations and maintenance of the Comprehensive Emergency Management Plan (CEMP). FCEM manages the county's Emergency Operations Center (EOC), located at 1769 East Moody Boulevard, Bldg 3, in Bunnell, which serves as the central hub for interagency coordination, resource allocation, and public information during major incidents. The agency consists of professional staff and multiple structured volunteer networks to augment operations on a daily basis and during emergencies and disasters.

== History ==
=== Early civil defense activities (1940s) ===
Flagler County's earliest organized emergency functions emerged during World War II under Civil Defense. Coastal watch towers were constructed in Flagler Beach and Painter's Hill, blackout rules were enforced along the shoreline, and residents were issued passes to cross the Intracoastal Waterway due to Coast Guard security measures. Local volunteers served as plane spotters, reporting aircraft positions to military authorities by telephone. These Civil defense functions formed the earliest foundation of what would later become Flagler County Emergency Management, representing early local operations that preceded modern emergency management practices.

During the same period, Flagler County supported civil defense aviation through coastal patrol base No. 5, which relocated to the Flagler Beach Airport on October 28, 1942. The Civil Air Patrol conducted daily anti-submarine patrols along Florida's Atlantic coast under the U.S. Office of Civilian Defense (OCD), operating from facilities constructed by the City of Flagler Beach, including a hangar, administration building, radio shack, and weather station. Although operated under federal authority, these activities complemented local Civil Defense responsibilities and expanded the county's early emergency preparedness role. Base personnel-maintained guard posts, hurricane evacuation plans, and coordination with the U.S. Weather Bureau, reflecting the county's early involvement in organized coastal defense and emergency preparedness.

=== Transition from civil defense to modern emergency management preparedness (1950s-1980s) ===
Civil defense programs established during World War II expanded during the Cold War and laid the foundation for modern emergency management practices in the United States. The OCD, coordinated federal, state, and local civilian protection efforts, a similar mission in scope to today's emergency management agencies. Following World War II, Flagler County began improving emergency access and infrastructure. Rural electrification reached the county in 1945, and major transportation upgrades, including the paving of Route 100 in 1946 and construction of a raised roadbed to Flagler beach in 1948. These things helped to address the chronic flooding and hazardous travel conditions within the county. A deteriorating Intracoastal Waterway drawbridge prompted emergency safety procedures in the late 1940s, including requiring schoolchildren to walk across the bridge while the empty bus followed. A new electrically operated concrete drawbridge was completed in 1950, improving emergency access to Flagler Beach. These post-war civil defense improvements strengthened the county's ability to respond to hazards and formed an early structural foundation for the emergency management system that would emerge decades later.

As Palm Coast developed in the 1970s and 1980s, emergency service needs increased. ITT Community Development Corporation (IDCD) funded an Emergency Services Building, fire trucks, and an emergency vehicle, significantly expanding county response capabilities and supporting the transition toward a coordinated emergency services system. Although Emergency Management and fire-rescue functions were already closely linked operationally during this period, these ITT-funded improvements strengthened countywide public safety capacity and contributed to the broader evolution from civil defense toward modern emergency management.

By the early 1980s, Flagler County was one of the fastest-growing counties in Florida, entering what local historians described as a "crucial decade" that set the stage for modern emergency management preparedness across the country.

=== Opening of the first Emergency Operations Center (1988) ===
Flagler County opened its first Emergency Operations Center (EOC) in 1988, following lessons learned from the 1985 wildfires. At the time, the county's emergency functions were still organized under Civil Defense, and the modern Emergency Management designation would not be adopted until 1995. The new EOC operated out of a 2,400 square-foot space in the former courthouse annex building in Bunnell and marked the county's first dedicated facility for coordinated disaster response.

=== Agency reorganization (1999) ===
In 1999, under a plan approved by the Flagler County Board of County Commissioners, the county reorganized its emergency functions by consolidating multiple public safety programs into a new parent department known as Flagler County Emergency Services. As part of this restructuring, emergency management became a division within Emergency Services, rather than a standalone department.

This organizational change aligned the county's emergency preparedness, response, and fire-rescue coordination under a unified administrative structure, shaping how major incidents were managed throughout the early 2000s.

=== EOC development (2004-2006) ===
Flagler County experienced three significant hurricanes during the 2004 Atlantic hurricane season. Hurricane Charley made landfall in August and became the first hurricane to directly pass over the county since 1960, causing widespread wind damage and exposing major gaps in emergency communications. The report noted that the storm revealed "critical limitations in emergency communications and coordination capacity", and recommended construction of a hardened Emergency Operations Center and improvements to radio interoperability. In September, Hurricane Frances passed south of Flagler County but produced tropical storm-force conditions, storm surge flooding, heavy rainfall, and extensive cosmetic damage. Later that month, Hurricane Jeanne brought additional tropical storm conditions and storm surge flooding, further stressing the County's response capabilities

Collectively, these storms revealed critical deficiencies in coordination, sheltering capabilities, and radio interoperability. In response, the Flagler County Board of County Commissioners approved construction of a dedicated, storm-hardened Emergency Operations Center (EOC) in the April 2005. During construction, Emergency Services, with Emergency Management operating as a division, worked out of the site where WNZF Radio operates today, until the new EOC opened in April 2006. The current facility is located at 1769 East Moody Blvd, Building 3, in Bunnell.

The EOC was designed to house emergency management, fire rescue administration, and county’s 9-1-1 communications center; serving as the central hub for coordinating emergency response, resource allocation, and public information during major incidents.

=== Department separation 2008 ===
In 2008, Flagler County dissolved the consolidated Emergency Services department created in 1999. As part of this restructuring, the county re-established the Flagler County Emergency Management Office as a standalone department, while Flagler County Fire Rescue became an independent fire-rescue and emergency medical services agency.

This change restored Emergency Management's direct administrative authority and clarified departmental responsibilities for preparedness, response, and recovery operations.

== Major incidents ==
=== 1985 wildfires ===
Wildfires, later suspected to involve arson, burned more than 39,000 acres in Flagler County after weeks of dry conditions, destroying 131 homes and damaging more than 200. Civil Defense coordinated shelter operations at local schools, managed public information, and supported multi-agency response efforts involving the Florida Division of Forestry, the National Guard, and FEMA.

The fires exposed areas for improvement in evacuation planning, communications, and land-use regulations. These lessons directly led to construction of Flagler County's first Emergency Operations Center in 1988.

=== 1998 wildfires ===
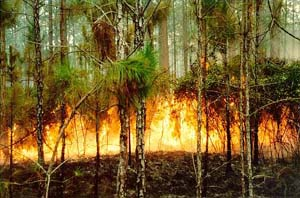
FEMA photograph taken during the 1998 Florida wildfires.

In June and July 1998, extreme drought conditions produced a major wildfire outbreak that heavily impacted Flagler County and led to a mandatory evacuation of the entire county. The Flagler County Emergency Operations Center was activated, coordinating incoming state and federal resources, including more than 10,000 firefighters, military support, and aerial suppression assets from across the country.

Emergency Management managed countywide evacuations logistics, shelter operations, emergency regulations, and disruptions to essential services, including transportation and postal operations. The incident underscored the need for expanded mitigation programs, improved interagency coordination, and long-term wildfire-risk reduction strategies.

=== 2011 wildfires ===
In June 2011, prolonged drought and record heat contributed to multiple large wildfires across Flagler County. Lightning produced two major incidents: the 5,136-acre Espanola Fire and the White Eagle Fire, which threatened homes in the Seminole Woods neighborhood.

The Emergency Operations Center coordinated multi-agency response efforts involving Flagler County Fire Rescue, the Palm Coast Fire Department, the Florida Division of Forestry’s Incident Management Teams, the National Guard, and state officials including Governor Rick Scott. Despite extensive fire activity, no homes were destroyed, due in part to coordinated structural protection and the deployment of specialized brush units operated by the Wildfire Mitigation Team.

== Emergency Operations Center activations ==
Flagler County Emergency Management activates its Emergency Operations Center (EOC) during significant emergencies and disasters; including wildfires, tropical cyclones, floods, public health incidents, and large-scale multi-agency responses. According to the county's Comprehensive Emergency Management Plan (CEMP), EOC staffing during activations includes representatives from municipalities, county departments, and key partner organizations, organized under the structure outlined in the EOC Organizational Chart. The CEMP defines three activation levels: Level III (Monitoring), Level II (Partial Activation), and Level I (Full Activation). The Emergency Management Director serves as the manager of the Emergency Operations Center and mobilizes the personnel and resources necessary to support significant incidents.

=== Activation levels ===
==== Level 3 - Monitoring ====
Implemented when Emergency Management receives notice of an incident or developing event that may escalate to threaten public safety. Information is shared with EOC personnel and partners through email, virtual meetings, and routine monitoring activities.

==== Level 2 - Partial activation ====
Initiated by the Emergency Management Director or designee when only specific Sections, Branches, Groups, or Units impacted by the hazard need to be staffed. Information is shared with EOC personnel and partners through in-person and virtual meetings, emails, and ongoing activities.

==== Level 1 - Full activation ====
Used for major incidents requiring full EOC staffing and 24-hour operations across all Sections, Branches, Groups, Units, and Command Staff. Information is shared with EOC personnel and partners through in-person and virtual meetings, emails, and ongoing activities.

=== 1960s ===
1960

- Hurricane Donna - Direct hurricane impact; widespread wind damage across Flagler County.

=== 1980s-1990s ===
1985

- Wildfires - Countywide evacuations, 131 homes destroyed, 2000 damaged; Civil Defense coordinated multi-agency coordination.

1989

- Wildfire activity - Seasonal EOC activations for regional fire conditions.

1998

- Wildfires - Largest wildfire event in county history; full county evacuation and multi-agency coordination.

1999

- Tropical Storm Floyd - Activation for wind, rain, downed trees, and flooding.
- Tropical Storm Irene - Activation for coastal impacts and heavy rainfall.
- Tropical Storm Harvey - Activation for localized flooding.

=== 2000s ===
2001

- Tropical Storm Gabrielle - Activation for wind and rain impacts.

2002

- West Nile Virus - Public health monitoring and coordination.

2004

- Hurricanes Charley - First direct hurricane impact since 1960; major communications failure.
- Hurricane Frances - Tropical storm conditions; surge flooding and widespread cosmetic damage.
- Hurricane Jeanne - Additional Tropical storm conditions; surge flooding and infrastructure strain.
- Hurricane Ivan - Activation for coastal impacts, heavy surf, and outer-band weather conditions.
- Tropical Storm Bonnie - Partial activation for rainfall and minor flooding.

2005

- Hurricanes Katrina - Regional support and readiness operations.
- Hurricane Ophelia - Activation for coastal impacts.
- Tropical Storm Tammy- Activation for flooding impacts.

2006

- Hurricane Ernesto - Activation for wind and rain impacts.
- Tropical Storm Alberto - Activation for heavy rainfall.

2007

- Fire season - Wildfire smoke and public safety coordination.

2008

- Hurricane Fay - Activation for flooding and wind impacts.
- Wildfires - Activation for multiple wildfire incidents, smoke impacts, and public coordination.
- USA-193 satellite re-entry - multi-hazard activations.

2009

- May flooding - Activation for widespread flooding.
- May train crash - Activation for transportation incident.
- Cold weather incidents - Activation for prolonged freezing temperatures.
- H1N1 - Public health coordination.

=== 2010s ===
2010

- Fire seasons - Activation for wildfire conditions.
- January freeze - Activation for prolonged freezing temperatures.

2011

- Hurricane Irene - Activation for coastal impacts.
- Wildfires - Activation for multiple wildfire incidents.

2012

- Hurricane Sandy - Activation for coastal erosion and flooding.
- Tropical Debby - Activation for flooding impacts.
- Tropical Isaac - Activation for wind and rain impacts.
- Tropical Beryl - Activation for coastal impacts.
- Fire season - Activation for wildfire conditions.

2013

- December tornado - Activation for EF1 tornado response and damage assessment.

2014

- September flooding - Activation for severe weather impacts.
- December nor'easter - Activation for coastal impacts.
- Cold weather - Activation for freezing temperatures.

2015

- Tropical Storm Erika - Activation for heavy rainfall and localized flooding.

2016

- Hurricane Matthew - Full activation for evacuations, sheltering, coastal impacts, and extended recovery operations

2017

- Hurricane Irma - Full activation for countywide flooding, prolonged power outages, and multi-day response operations.

2018

- Hurricane Michael - Activation for regional impacts, rainfall, and protective measures despite distant landfall.

2019

- Hurricane Dorian - Activation for hurricane preparedness and response.
- December tornado response - Activation for EF1 tornado recovery operations.

=== 2020s ===
2020

- COVID-19 - Extended activation for pandemic response.
- Hurricane Isaias - Activation for coastal impacts.
- Hurricane Eta - Activation for flooding and wind impacts.

2021

- Tropical Storm Elsa - Activation for wind and rain impacts.

2022

- Hurricane Ian - Full activation for flooding, storm surge, and widespread infrastructure impacts.
- Hurricane Nicole - Full activation for coastal erosion, structural damage, and extended power restoration coordination.

2023

- Hurricane Idalia - Activation for storm impacts.
- October tornado - Activation for EF2 tornado response.

2024

- Hurricane Debby - Activation for coastal impacts and heavy rainfall.
- Hurricane Helene - Activation for inland flooding and tropical storm conditions.
- Hurricane Milton - Activation for flooding, wind damage, and countywide response operations.

== Programs and capabilities ==
=== ALERTFlagler ===
Emergency Management administers ALERTFlagler, a free emergency notification system used to deliver localized weather alerts, evacuation orders, and public safety messages.

=== Public education programs ===
Flagler County Emergency Management offers public preparedness and volunteer training programs in partnership with local and national organizations. Courses are provided at no cost to residents and cover topics such as general disaster preparedness, emergency communications, medical triage, first aid, animal sheltering, evacuation shelter operations, and volunteer coordination during disaster response.

== Administration ==
The department is organized under a professional public safety framework. Its full-time professional staff includes an Emergency Management Director, an Emergency Management Manager, and a team of Emergency Management Planners and Specialists. Operational capabilities during major Emergency Operations Center activations include dozens or partner agencies and organizations, and are heavily supplemented by a structured network of emergency management and local community volunteers.

=== Local legal authority ===
Flagler County's Emergency Management Ordinance History
Ordinance Name	Date of Approval	Description of Ordinance
Ordinance 82-9	May 3,1982	Created the Flagler County Civil Defense and formally defined local responsibilities for civil defense and disaster preparedness. This ordinance provided the county's first structured legal framework for emergency planning and hazard response.
Flagler County Code of Ordinances, Chapter 12 (Emergency management	December 3, 1990	Chapter 12 was created during the county's 1990 codification of its genera; and permanent ordinances. It established the Emergency management chapter as part of the organized county code, outlining local authority, responsibilities, and emergency management structure.
Ordinance 96-10	November 18, 1996	Amended the county code to establish procedures for issuing local emergency declarations. This ordinance clarified how and when the county could declare emergencies and provided an effective date for the updated process.
Ordinance 91-17	September 15, 1997	Established the county's order of succession and continuity-of-government procedures during emergencies. This ensured stable leadership and operational continuity under disaster conditions.
Ordinance 08-13	July 7, 2008	Amended the Emergency management chapter of the Flagler County Code by Creating Article 3, "Debris Removal from Flagler County Roads."
Ordinance 2012-04	June 18, 2012	Repealed outdated county code provisions and amended Section 12-34 to clarify the Board of County Commissioners'' emergency-declaration authority in compliance with state law.
Ordinance 2015-15	December 21, 2015	Amended Articles 2 and 3 of Chapter 12 related to Emergency Management, including definitions, director responsibilities, volunteer provisions, emergency declaration authority, and debris-removal procedures.

=== State legal authority (Florida Statutes Chapter 252) ===
Florida Statutes Chapter 252, known as the State Emergency Management Act, establishes statewide framework for emergency preparedness, response, recovery, and mitigation. The act declares that "the state is vulnerable to a wide range of emergencies" and establishes the intent to reduce vulnerability, coordinate evacuation and shelter operations, support public health emergencies, and ensure transparent emergency preparedness and response activities. The statute defines the policy and purpose of the state's Emergency management system, including the creation of the Division of Emergency Management, the authorization of local Emergency management agencies, and the establishment of statewide mutual aid. Chapter 252 provides emergency powers to the Governor, the Division, and local governments; set limitations on the powers; and defines key Emergency management terms such as "disaster", "emergency', "local Emergency management agency", and "natural emergency". Chapter 252 also outlines extensive responsibilities for the Division of Emergency Management, including maintaining the State Comprehensive Emergency Management Plan (CEMP), coordinating with federal and local partners, adopting standards for county Emergency management plans, conducting statewide straining and exercise, maintaining inventories of critical emergency resources, and supporting local governments during major or catastrophic disasters. These provisions form the legal foundation for Emergency management operations across Florida and guide the planning, coordination, and disaster response requirements of county emergency management agencies such as Flagler County Emergency Management.

== Emergency management directors ==
Name	Years in Role	Position
Raymond Smith	1962–1979	Civil Defense Director
Bob Barzelogna	1979–1996	Civil Defense Director / Veterans Service Officer
Jerry Davis	1996–1998	Emergency Services Director
Ron Bolser	1998-1999	Emergency Services Director
Eric Gentry	1999–2002	Emergency Services Director
Doug Wright	2002–2005	Emergency Services Director
Nathan McCollum	2006–2009	Emergency Services Director
Troy Harper	2009–2013	Emergency Management Chief
Kevin Guthrie	2013–2016	Public Safety Emergency Management Manager
Steve Garten	2016–2017	Public Safety Emergency Management Manager
Jonathan Lord	2018–present	Emergency Management Chief/ Director

== See also ==
- Emergency management
- Emergency operations center
- Flagler County, Florida
- Bunnell, FL
- Flagler Beach, FL
- Marineland, FL
- Beverly Beach, FL
- Palm Coast, FL
- Florida Division of Emergency Management
