= Flagler County, Florida =

County in Florida, United States

- County
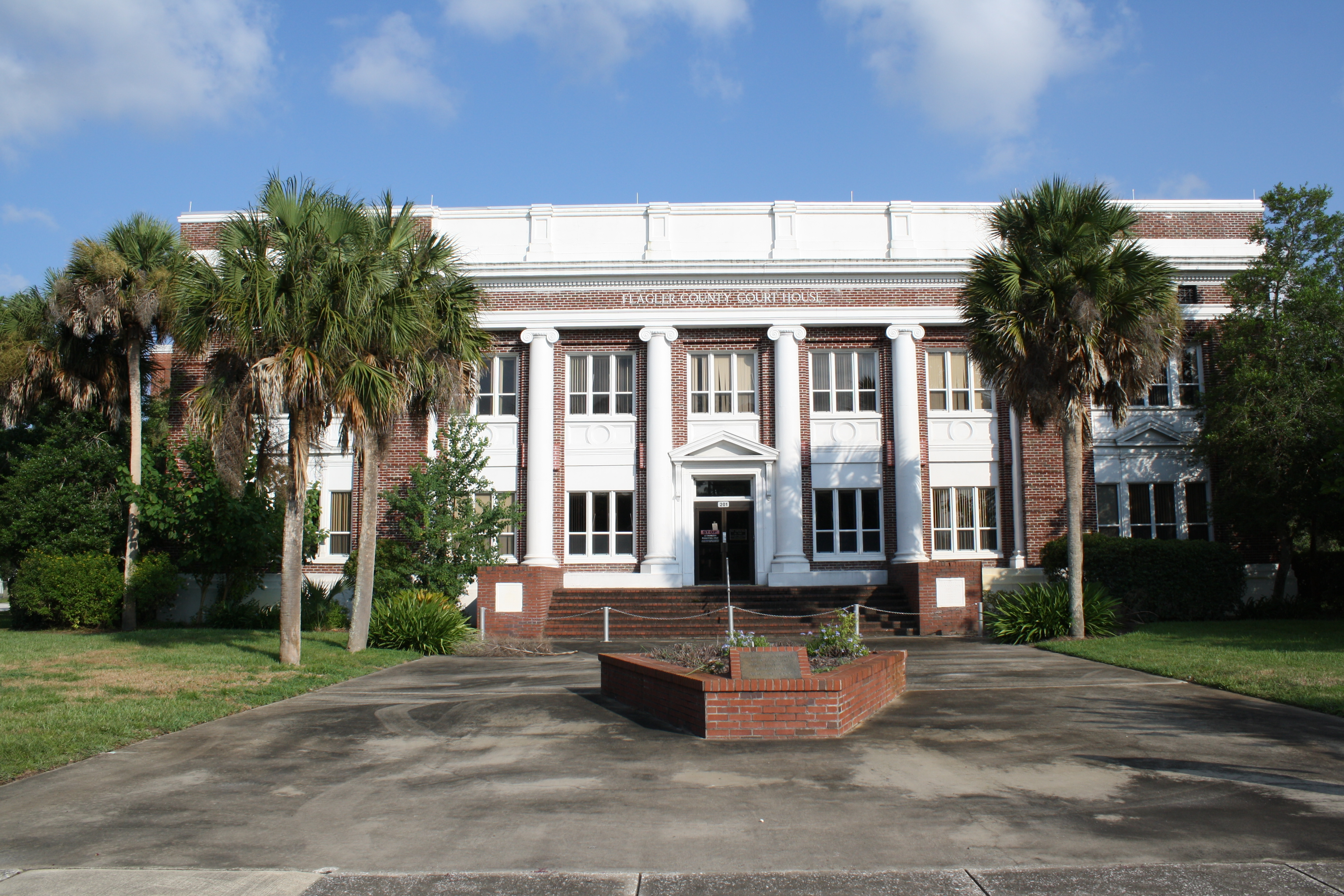
- Flagler County Courthouse in Bunnell

- Logo

- Location within the U.S. state of Florida
- Coordinates: 29°28′N 81°18′W
- Country: United States
- State: Florida
- Founded: April 28, 1917
- Named for: Henry Flagler
- Seat: Bunnell
- Largest city: Palm Coast

Area
  - Total: 571 sq mi (1,480 km^{2})
  - Land: 485 sq mi (1,260 km^{2})
  - Water: 85 sq mi (220 km^{2}) 15.0%

Population (2020)
  - Total: 115,378
  - Estimate (2025): 140,360 ▲
  - Density: 238/sq mi (91.9/km^{2})
- Time zone: UTC−5 (Eastern)
  - Summer (DST): UTC−4 (EDT)
- Congressional district: 6th
- Website: www.flaglercounty.gov/Home

Flagler County is situated in the northeastern quadrant of the U.S. state of Florida. The population as of the 2020 census was 115,378. Bunnell is the county seat, and Palm Coast is the largest city. Flagler County is part of the Deltona–Daytona Beach–Ormond Beach, FL metropolitan statistical area, but is also part of the Orlando–Deltona–Daytona Beach, FL Combined Statistical Area, typically associated with Central Florida.

== History ==
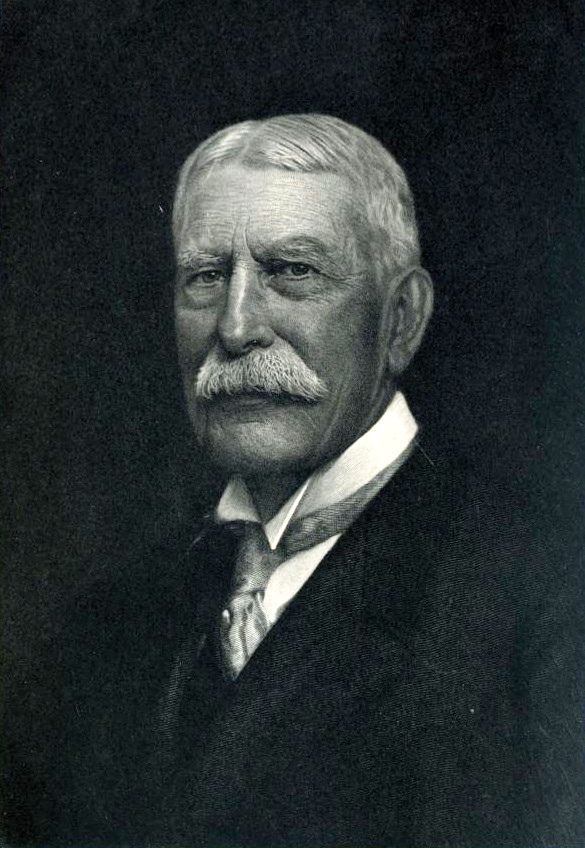
Henry Flagler, county namesake

The region was home to Seminole and Timucua tribes before the Spanish arrived in the 16th century. Large plantations grew cash crops including corn and sugar cane in the early 1800s. Bulow Plantation Ruins Historic State Park was the biggest sugar plantation on Florida's east coast. Farmers also cultivated the Irish potato and the potato is on the county seal. Beginning in the 1800s, agriculture (cabbage and potato farming), silviculture and ranching (cattle farming) were the economic drivers of the county. The county was created in 1917 using parts of Volusia and St. Johns Counties. It was named in honor of Henry Flagler, the wealthy Industrialist who financed and constructed the Florida East Coast Railway. The county was involved in the Florida land boom of the 1920s which generated tourism. Bunnell was incorporated as a city in 1924, Flagler Beach the following year and the original courthouse in Bunnell was built in 1926.

=== Tourism ===
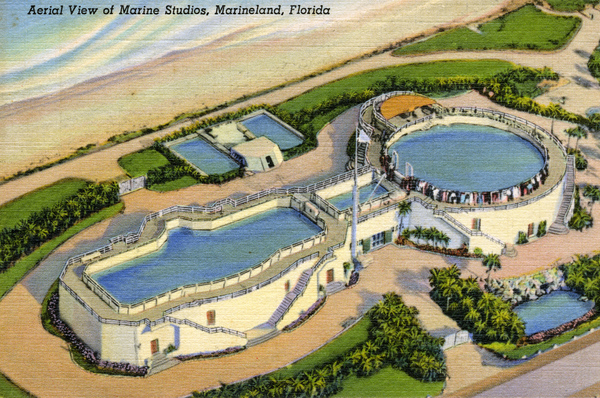
Marineland

Marine Studios was one of Florida's first marine mammal parks, billed as "the world's first oceanarium". The first attraction was a bottlenose dolphin. Approximately 30,000 people showed up for the grand opening on June 23, 1938 and Florida State Road A1A was gridlocked for miles in both directions. Underwater scenes were filmed at the facility in hundreds of movies. It was one of the first tourist attractions built in Florida, intended for St. Augustine but ended up in Flagler County. It was renamed Marineland of Florida in 1961.

=== Cement ===
The Pennsylvania-based Lehigh Cement Company purchased 9,000 acres (3,600 ha) of Flagler County land in 1948 and began building a manufacturing plant for Portland cement in 1949. A rail spur was constructed from the plant, seven miles to the Florida East Coast Railway tracks north of Bunnell. A navigable canal was built from the Intracoastal Waterway to the plant allowing fuel oil delivery from barges. The area’s soil has coquina shell containing lime, a major component of cement, and the plant was expected to produce 1.5 million barrels of cement per year for 100 years. The plant opened in 1952 and employed 300 for a dozen years. The cement bags were loaded in box cars and bulk product into tank cars. The plant's peak production occurred in 1958 when 150 rail cars were loaded every day. Despite high productivity and earnings, the plants could not recapture enough funds through depreciation to pay for replacement machinery. The Bunnell plant was closed down in 1965. The property was purchased by ITT for $8 million on December 23, 1968.

=== Palm Coast ===
Palm Coast was established in 1969-1970 as a master-planned community by International Telephone & Telegraph Corporation, transforming over 40,000 acres of pine forest and wetlands into a residential "golf town". At the time, the population of the county was under 5,000. The population nearly doubled every ten years through 2010 when the population reached 95,696. Formally incorporated in 1999, it grew from a planned retirement/resort area into a thriving city, now known for its extensive canal systems and rapid population growth.

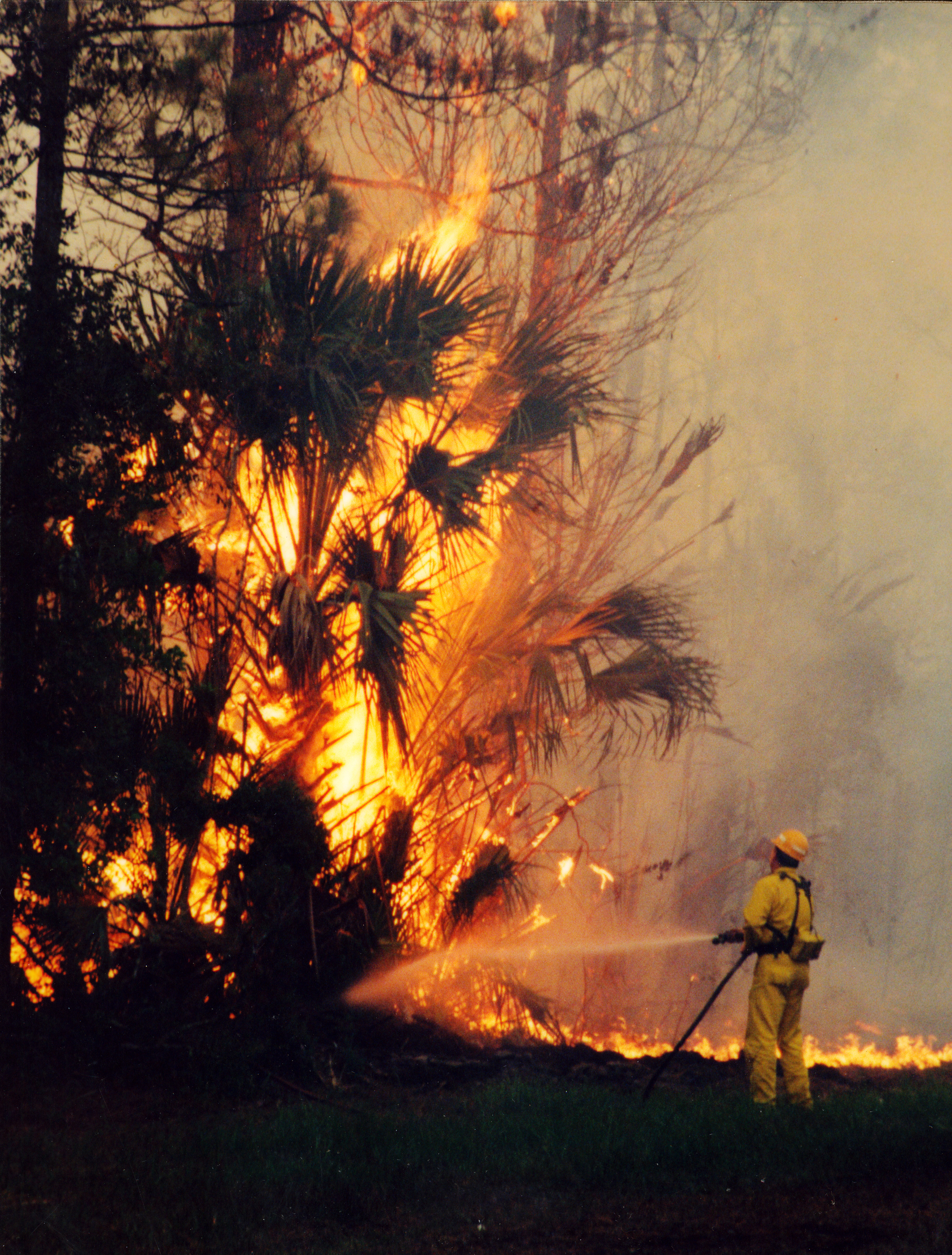
Wildfire on State Road #11, near Bunnell, Florida

=== Wildfire ===
Florida had its first serious wildland–urban interface fire in 1985 with the Palm Coast Fire, which burned 131 homes. Research on this fire indicated that the most important factor was the proximity of heavy ground vegetation to the structures. Thirteen years later, fires struck the same Palm Coast subdivision. The 1998 fires were national news because Flagler County Emergency Management had to order the whole county to evacuate, and 45,000 people were displaced. Fire suppression organizations responded from 44 states, and Florida hosted the largest aerial suppression operation ever conducted in the United States. Because of the massive effort, only 71 homes were destroyed.

== Geography ==
U.S. Census Bureau data shows that the total area of the county is 571 square miles (1,480 km^{2}), of which 485 square miles (1,260 km^{2}) is land and 85 square miles (220 km^{2}) (15.0%) is water. The county has 18-miles of Atlantic coastline.

=== Adjacent counties ===
- St. Johns County, Florida – north
- Volusia County, Florida – south
- Putnam County, Florida – west

=== Parks and gardens ===
The county has over 40 preserves and parks for use by sunbathers, campers, swimmers, boaters and nature-lovers. There are more than 90 miles of trails for biking, hiking, and paddling.

- Belle Terre Parkway
- Betty Steflik Preserve Archived September 26, 2009, at the Wayback Machine
- Bings Landing Archived September 26, 2009, at the Wayback Machine
- Bird of Paradise Nature Reserve
- Bull Creek Campground Archived September 26, 2009, at the Wayback Machine
- Bulow Creek State Park
- Bulow Plantation Ruins Historic State Park
- Central Park in Town Center
- Children's Memorial Garden
- Gamble Rogers Memorial State Recreation Area
- Graham Swamp Preserve Archived September 26, 2009, at the Wayback Machine
- Haw Creek Preserve / Russell Landing Archived September 26, 2009, at the Wayback Machine
- Heroes Memorial Park
- Herschel King Park Archived September 26, 2009, at the Wayback Machine
- Hidden Trails Park Archived September 26, 2009, at the Wayback Machine
- James F. Holland Memorial Park
- Jungle Hut Park Archived September 26, 2009, at the Wayback Machine
- Lehigh Trail Archived September 26, 2009, at the Wayback Machine
- Longs Landing Estuary
- Malacompra Park Archived September 26, 2009, at the Wayback Machine
- Moody Homestead Park Archived September 26, 2009, at the Wayback Machine
- Old Dixie Park Archived September 26, 2009, at the Wayback Machine
- Old Salt Park Archived September 26, 2009, at the Wayback Machine
- Palm Coast Community Center & Park
- Palm Coast Linear Park
- Princess Place Preserve
- Ralph Carter Park
- River to Sea Preserve Archived September 26, 2009, at the Wayback Machine
- Seminole Woods Neighborhood Park
- Shell Bluff Park Archived September 26, 2009, at the Wayback Machine
- Silver Lake Park
- St. Joe Walkway
- Varn Park Archived September 26, 2009, at the Wayback Machine
- Veteran's Park
- Wadsworth Park Archived September 26, 2009, at the Wayback Machine
- Washington Oaks State Gardens
- Waterfront Park
- Wickline Park

=== Rivers and waterways ===
- Atlantic Ocean
- Crescent Lake
- Intracoastal Waterway
- Matanzas River
- Pellicer Creek

== Demographics ==
Historical population
Census	Pop.	Note	%±
1920	2,442		—
1930	2,466		1.0%
1940	3,008		22.0%
1950	3,367		11.9%
1960	4,566		35.6%
1970	4,454		−2.5%
1980	10,913		145.0%
1990	28,701		163.0%
2000	49,832		73.6%
2010	95,696		92.0%
2020	115,378		20.6%
2025 (est.)	140,360	▲	21.7%
U.S. Decennial Census; 1790-1960 1900-1990; 1990-2000 2010-2019

=== Racial and ethnic composition ===
Flagler County, Florida – Racial and ethnic composition Note: the US Census treats Hispanic/Latino as an ethnic category. This table excludes Latinos from the racial categories and assigns them to a separate category. Hispanics/Latinos may be of any race.
Race / Ethnicity (NH = Non-Hispanic)	Pop 1980	Pop 1990	Pop 2000	Pop 2010	Pop 2020	% 1980	% 1990	% 2000	% 2010	% 2020
White alone (NH)	9,413	24,841	41,636	72,860	84,291	86.25%	86.55%	83.55%	76.14%	73.06%
Black or African American alone (NH)	1,274	2,270	4,295	10,470	10,537	11.67%	7.91%	8.62%	10.94%	9.13%
Native American or Alaska Native alone (NH)	6	50	119	223	291	0.05%	0.17%	0.24%	0.23%	0.25%
Asian alone (NH)	29	269	576	2,020	2,450	0.27%	0.94%	1.16%	2.11%	2.12%
Native Hawaiian or Pacific Islander alone (NH)	x	x	11	47	59	x	x	0.02%	0.05%	0.05%
Other race alone (NH)	3	11	85	290	704	0.03%	0.04%	0.17%	0.30%	0.61%
Mixed race or Multiracial (NH)	x	x	573	1,535	4,747	x	x	1.15%	1.60%	4.11%
Hispanic or Latino (any race)	188	1,260	2,537	8,251	12,299	1.72%	4.39%	5.09%	8.62%	10.66%
Total	10,913	28,701	49,832	95,696	115,378	100.00%	100.00%	100.00%	100.00%	100.00%

A map of the racial demographics of Flagler County, Florida by Census tract Legend: Non-Hispanic White 50–60% 60–70% 70–80% 80–90% >90%

=== 2020 census ===
As of the 2020 census, Flagler County had a population of 115,378, 48,450 households, and 34,022 families; the population density was 237.3 per square mile (91.6/km^{2}), and there were 55,565 housing units at an average density of 114.3 per square mile (44.1/km^{2}). Of those housing units, 12.8% were vacant, 78.5% of the occupied units were owner-occupied, and 21.5% were renter-occupied, with a homeowner vacancy rate of 2.1% and a rental vacancy rate of 10.7%.

As of the 2020 census, the median age was 54.0 years; 16.5% of residents were under the age of 18, 6.0% were 18 to 24, 17.4% were 25 to 44, 28.0% were 45 to 64, and 32.2% were 65 years of age or older. For every 100 females there were 92.2 males, and for every 100 females age 18 and over there were 89.6 males age 18 and over.

As of the 2020 census, the racial makeup of the county was 76.0% White, 9.5% Black or African American, 0.3% American Indian and Alaska Native, 2.2% Asian, 0.1% Native Hawaiian and Pacific Islander, 3.0% from some other race, and 9.0% from two or more races. Hispanic or Latino residents of any race comprised 10.7% of the population.

As of the 2020 census, 92.3% of residents lived in urban areas, while 7.7% lived in rural areas.

As of the 2020 census, there were 48,450 households, of which 21.8% had children under the age of 18 living in them. Of all households, 54.8% were married-couple households, 14.1% were households with a male householder and no spouse or partner present, and 24.7% were households with a female householder and no spouse or partner present. About 24.0% of all households were made up of individuals and 14.8% had someone living alone who was 65 years of age or older. The average household size was 2.5 and the average family size was 2.9.

=== 2020 American Community Survey (2016–2020) estimates ===
According to the 2016–2020 American Community Survey 5-year estimates, 19.7% of residents had a bachelor’s degree or higher. The median household income was $57,536 (± $2,337), and the median family income was $66,778 (± $2,998). Males had a median income of $34,295 (± $3,092) versus $26,810 (± $1,300) for females, and the median income for those over 16 years old was $30,465 (± $1,204). Approximately 7.8% of families and 11.0% of the population were below the poverty line, including 16.4% of those under the age of 18 and 6.9% of those ages 65 or over.

=== 2010 census ===
As of the census of 2010, there were 95,696 people, 39,186 households, and 27,843 families residing in the county. The population density was 197.1 people per square mile. There were 48,595 housing units. The racial makeup of the county was 82.3% White, 11.4% Black or African American. 8.6% of the population were Hispanic or Latino of any race.

In the county, the population was spread out, with 19.9% under the age of 18, and 24.5% who were 65 years of age or older.

The median income for a household in the county was $51,049, and the median income for a family was $58,327.

Flagler County was ranked the fastest-growing county in the nation by the US Census Bureau from 2000 to 2005, boasting a 53.3% change, with a July 1, 2005, population estimate at 76,410. As of 2016 the largest ancestry group in the county was English-American at 18.1% of the county, followed by German-American at 12.7% and Irish-American also at 12.7%.

== Economy ==
The top employers in Flagler County are schools, followed by full-service restaurants, medical & hospitals, landscaping services, limited-service restaurants, government offices, supermarkets & grocery stores, hotels & motels, retail superstores and department stores.

== Transportation ==
=== Airports ===
Flagler Executive Airport is the primary airport within the county. It does not provide commercial air services but does serve private, student and business aviation. Formerly Flagler County Airport, it was renamed April 20, 2015 following $22 million in projects and improvements completed over six years including a new control tower. Construction began in 2025 on a replacement for the 40-year-old General Aviation Terminal, used by the Fixed Base Operator (FBO) and administration offices. The 15,500 square feet (1,440 m^{2}) building was budgeted at $11.2 million and expected to open late 2026.

=== Bridges ===
The Intracoastal Waterway (ICW) has always been a physical barrier to the Atlantic Ocean and beaches for county residents. It is affectionately nicknamed "The Ditch" by locals and boaters because the man-made waterway is typically shallow, narrow, and demands attention. George Moody established a ferry service for two cars in 1914. A turnstile bridge was constructed in October 1920. The wooden structure was so weak that passengers on the school bus were required to disembark and cross separately from the empty bus. In 1951 a drawbridge constructed of steel and concrete and steel replaced the old wood bridge. It remained the only way to cross the ICW until the Hammock Dunes Bridge opened in 1988. The drawbridge was finally replaced by the Flagler Beach Bridge in 1997.

=== Major roads ===
- I-95 (Interstate 95)
- US 1
- SR A1A
- SR 11
- SR 20
- SR 100

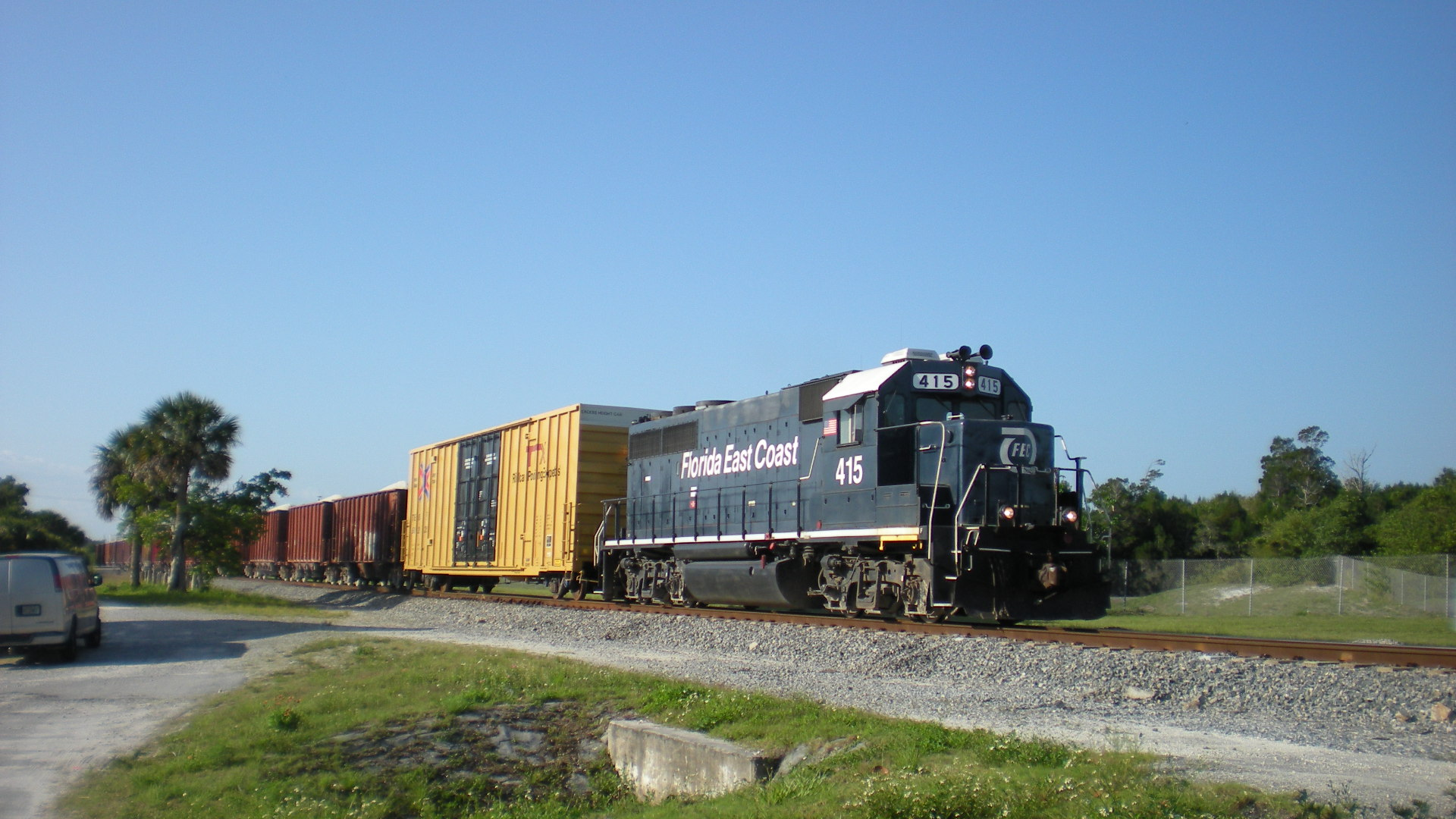
FEC locomotive 920

=== Other ===
- The Florida East Coast Railway provides rail freight services in the county.
- The Intracoastal Waterway runs just in from the coast in eastern Flagler County and provides for freight shipping and recreational boating.

== Politics ==
=== Flagler County Board of County Commissioners ===
Flagler County's foremost elected body is the Board of County Commissioners, a five-seat board elected in partisan races with four-year terms. The County Commission has the following members:

Position	Name	Party
Commissioner, District 1	Andy Dance	Republican
Commissioner, District 2	Greg Hansen	Republican
Commissioner, District 3	Kim Carney (Vice Chair)	Republican
Commissioner, District 4	Leann Pennington (Chair)	Republican
Commissioner, District 5	Pam Richardson	Republican

Commissioners Pennington and Hansen are in office until 2026, having each been elected in 2022. Dance's term expires in 2028, having been re-elected in the 2024 primary election. Carney and Richardson were elected in 2024, and their terms will expire in 2028.

=== Flagler County School Board ===
The county is also served by the Flagler School Board, who are elected in non-partisan races to four-year terms in office. One seat is vacant due to Derek Barrs leaving to serve as the U.S. Administrator of the Federal Motor Carrier Safety Administration. The members are as follows:

Position	Name
School Board Member, District 1	Vacant
School Board Member, District 2	Will Furry (Vice Chair)
School Board Member, District 3	Janie Ruddy
School Board Member, District 4	Christy Chong (Chair)
School Board Member, District 5	Lauren Ramirez

Furry and Chong are in office until 2026, having both been elected in 2022. Barrs was defeated by Ruddy in the 2024 election, but was then appointed by Gov. Ron DeSantis to fulfill the vacancy created by member Sally Hunt's resignation. The county elected Janie Ruddy to the District 3 seat and Lauren Ramirez to the District 5 seat in the 2024 election respectively.

=== East Flagler Mosquito Control District ===
Flagler County voters elect three individuals to the East Flagler Mosquito Control District Board of Commissioners in non-partisan races, with each serving a four-year term in office. The commissioners are responsible for overseeing the management of mosquito breeding and population within the county. The members are as follows:

Position	Name
Commissioner, Seat 1	Perry Mitrano
Commissioner, Seat 2	Mike Martin (Chair)
Commissioner, Seat 3	Lance Alred

Alred was last elected in 2024, winning terms that expire in 2028. Martin was also up for election in 2024, but faced no opposition. Seat 1 became vacant on December 2, 2025 when Julius 'Jules' Kwiatkowski was announced to have passed away while serving his term in office. Kwiatkowski had been on the Mosquito Control Board since 2008. Perry Mitrano was appointed to his seat by Florida Agriculture Commissioner Wilton Simpson on December 17, 2025.

=== Other elected officials ===
The county is also served by five elected constitutional officers: Sheriff Rick Staly, Property Appraiser Jay Gardner, Clerk of Courts Tom Bexley, Tax Collector Shelly Edmonson, and Elections Supervisor Kaiti Lenhart.

=== Presidential election results ===
United States presidential election results for Flagler County, Florida
Year	Republican		Democratic		Third party(ies)	
Year	No.	%	No.	%	No.	%
1920	74	19.79%	206	55.08%	94	25.13%
1924	75	20.16%	202	54.30%	95	25.54%
1928	325	58.14%	219	39.18%	15	2.68%
1932	94	16.52%	475	83.48%	0	0.00%
1936	106	17.29%	507	82.71%	0	0.00%
1940	136	19.74%	553	80.26%	0	0.00%
1944	114	22.14%	401	77.86%	0	0.00%
1948	154	23.77%	153	23.61%	341	52.62%
1952	512	51.30%	486	48.70%	0	0.00%
1956	498	41.92%	690	58.08%	0	0.00%
1960	426	31.35%	933	68.65%	0	0.00%
1964	718	43.31%	940	56.69%	0	0.00%
1968	360	20.25%	601	33.80%	817	45.95%
1972	1,409	74.08%	493	25.92%	0	0.00%
1976	1,262	37.41%	2,086	61.84%	25	0.74%
1980	2,895	51.70%	2,503	44.70%	202	3.61%
1984	4,913	62.08%	3,000	37.91%	1	0.01%
1988	6,504	60.32%	4,244	39.36%	34	0.32%
1992	6,246	38.19%	6,693	40.92%	3,416	20.89%
1996	8,234	41.01%	9,585	47.74%	2,260	11.26%
2000	12,618	46.53%	13,897	51.25%	601	2.22%
2004	19,633	51.02%	18,578	48.28%	269	0.70%
2008	23,951	48.66%	24,726	50.24%	540	1.10%
2012	26,969	53.19%	23,207	45.77%	531	1.05%
2016	33,850	58.38%	22,026	37.98%	2,111	3.64%
2020	43,043	59.90%	28,161	39.19%	659	0.92%
2024	51,014	63.59%	28,431	35.44%	772	0.96%

=== U.S. Senate elections results ===
United States Senate election results for Flagler County, Florida1
Year	Republican		Democratic		Third party(ies)	
Year	No.	%	No.	%	No.	%
2024	49,683	62.96%	28,051	35.55%	1,179	1.49%

United States Senate election results for Flagler County, Florida3
Year	Republican		Democratic		Third party(ies)	
Year	No.	%	No.	%	No.	%
2022	37,934	64.12%	20,204	34.15%	1,023	1.73%

=== Statewide elections ===
Florida Gubernatorial election results for Flagler County
Year	Republican		Democratic		Third party(ies)	
Year	No.	%	No.	%	No.	%
1994	7,160	47.37%	7,954	52.63%	0	0.00%
1998	9,779	54.01%	8,326	45.99%	0	0.00%
2002	14,407	55.97%	11,133	43.25%	199	0.77%
2006	15,376	51.81%	13,589	45.79%	714	2.41%
2010	17,711	52.91%	14,430	43.11%	1,335	3.99%
2014	19,996	52.82%	15,994	42.25%	1,868	4.93%
2018	30,951	58.60%	21,183	40.11%	682	1.29%
2022	39,183	66.76%	19,177	32.67%	336	0.57%

=== Voter registration ===
According to the Secretary of State's office, Republicans are a plurality of registered voters in Flagler County. The last Democrat to win the county was Barack Obama in 2008, and since then it has seen a gradual increase in Republican support in every election. In 2024, Donald Trump performed better in the county than any Republican since Nixon's 1972 landslide.

Flagler County Voter Registration &
Party Enrollment as of April 30, 2025
Political Party	Total Voters	Percentage
Republican	49,478	49.41%
Democratic	24,392	24.36%
No party affiliation	22,635	22.61%
Minor parties	3,624	3.62%
Total	100,129	100.00%

== Education ==
The Flagler County School Board operates the following public schools:

- Belle Terre Elementary
- Bunnell Elementary
- Old Kings Elementary
- Rymfire Elementary
- Wadsworth Elementary
- Buddy Taylor Middle School
- Indian Trails Middle School
- Matanzas High School
- Flagler Palm Coast High School
- Imagine School at Town Center (charter)
- Flagler Technical College

The Roman Catholic Diocese of Orlando operates St. Elizabeth Ann Seton Catholic School.

In addition, Daytona State College maintains a branch campus in Palm Coast.

== Libraries ==
Flagler County Library System consists of two branches with over 57,000 borrowers. The Main Branch is located at 2500 Palm Coast Pkwy NW, Palm Coast and the Bunnell Branch is located at 103 E Moody Blvd, Bunnell. The Flagler County Library system currently employees eighteen staff, with fourteen full-time employees and four part-time employees with an annual operating budget of $1 million.

The Flagler County Public Library was created by the County Commission in 1987, but as early as 1937, a room of the County Courthouse in Bunnell was set aside for a small library, which was sponsored by the Colony Club. The current library director is Holly Albanese.

The Flagler County Library System offers a wide variety of services beyond traditional library services. They have an e-book collection through Overdrive and Axis360. The library system will assist patrons in filing taxes, and applying for some government programs, as well as with passport applications. Both libraries offer fax services, and the Main Branch also offers scanning services.

In 2001, the Flagler County Library System began a local oral history project called the "Flagler County Memories Project". This project is currently being recorded and then preserved on compact discs. The project mission states, "This collection of oral life histories seeks to sample the common themes and unique stories of selected local residents."

== Healthcare ==
In 1951, Dr. John Canakaris' opened Bunnell Medical Clinic with 5 beds. And later the clinic increased the number of beds to 22. In 1960, Bunnell Medical Clinic became Bunnell General Hospital with 60 beds. In 1977, Bunnell Community Hospital with 80 hospital beds was built. Later Hospital Corporation of America purchased the hospital and renamed it Memorial Hospital-Flagler. In late May 2000, Memorial Health Systems chose to merge with Adventist Health System. In September 2002, Memorial Hospital-Flagler constructed a new facility in Palm Coast with 81 beds for $67 million and was renamed Florida Hospital Flagler. An outpatient clinic named Florida Hospital Flagler Medical Plaza opened on July 10, 2012. On January 2, 2019, Florida Hospital Flagler rebranded to AdventHealth Palm Coast.

A second AdventHealth hospital opened in Palm Coast on August 2, 2023. At the end of the first year, AdventHealth Palm Coast Parkway's Emergency department had treated 30,000 people, had 5,300 inpatient visits, and 16,700 outpatient visits. The new hospital hired 650 employees.

== Communities ==
=== Cities ===
- Bunnell
- Flagler Beach
- Palm Coast

=== Towns ===
- Beverly Beach
- Marineland (partly in St. John's County)

=== Unincorporated communities ===
- Andalusia
- Bimini
- Cody's Corner
- Daytona North
- Dupont
- Espanola
- Favoretta
- Hammock
- Korona
- Orange Hammock
- Painters Hill
- Relay
- St. Johns Park

== See also ==
- Flagler County Emergency Management
- Bike trails in Florida (paved)
- National Register of Historic Places listings in Flagler County, Florida
- Halifax area
- First Coast
