= Caesar DePaço =

Portuguese businessman (born 1965)

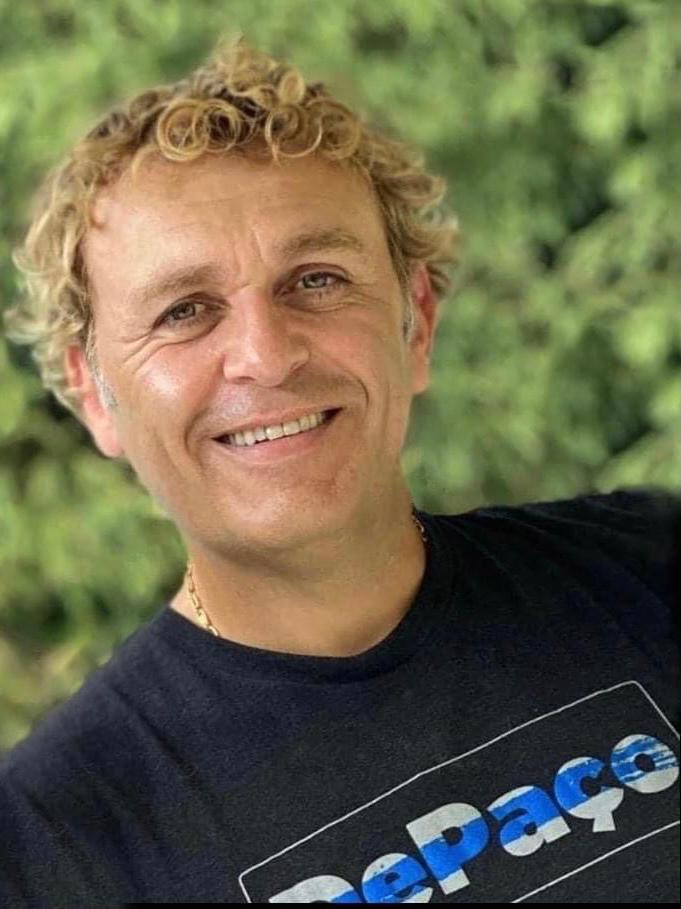

Honorary Consul of the Portuguese Republic in Florida
- In office 3 October 2014 – 14 May 2020
- Appointed by: Rui Machete; Minister of Foreign Affairs

Personal details
- Born: César Manuel Cardoso Matos do Paço; 21 September 1965 (age 61) Madalena, Azores, Portugal
- Occupation: CEO of Summit Nutritionals International

On 5 August 2025, content from this article was removed to comply with a court order and cannot be restored. Therefore, this article no longer meets Wikipedia's standards for neutrality and comprehensiveness. The removed content can still be accessed in the Spanish-language version of this article and its Google translation to English, as it was not affected by the court order.
The English Wikipedia community objects to the Portuguese courts' interference with our editorial independence and our mission to bring free knowledge to the world. More information can be found in the court order and its English translation. Additional details, including a description of the prohibited content, are available in the talk page and in the Wikimedia Foundation's announcement. See also § Wikimedia legal affairs and Wikipedia:Articles for deletion/Caesar DePaço.

César Manuel Cardoso Matos do Paço (born 21 September 1965), also known as Caesar DePaço, is a Portuguese businessman. He was an honorary consul for both Portugal and Cape Verde in the United States, in Palm Coast, Florida. DePaço is the chief executive officer of Summit Nutritionals International, a food industry company.

Following his tenure as the first – and only – Honorary Consul of Portugal to Florida, DePaço was appointed as Honorary Consul of Cape Verde to Florida. He subsequently left the position amidst revelations he had donated to the far-right anti-immigration Chega party and maintained close ties to the party. This coincided with the resignation of the Cape Verdean foreign minister, Luís Filipe Tavares.

In 2021, DePaço filed a lawsuit against Wikipedia and its editors, which the Wikimedia Foundation characterized as a strategic lawsuit against public participation. In 2025, the Supreme Court of Portugal ordered that Wikipedia remove certain content from the English and Portuguese Wikipedia articles and disclose the personal data of those who had written it. The Wikimedia Foundation complied with the order.

== Early life ==
DePaço was born in Madalena do Pico, Azores on 21 September 1965.

His father was the head of an Azorean finance department. According to DePaço, his entire childhood was spent in the Azores until he was 11 years old, when he visited the United States, to which he later emigrated in 1994.

== Career ==
According to the Portuguese newspaper Expresso in 2014, DePaço has a degree in psychology and two doctorates while also a professor of psychology in Bangkok, Thailand, for four years.

DePaço is the chief executive officer of Summit Nutritionals International, a food-industry company.

On 3 October 2014, DePaço was appointed as Honorary Consul of the Portuguese Republic in Florida, based out of the city of Palm Coast. At the time, he was one of only two Honorary Consulates, with full powers other than the granting of visas. He declined state aid from Portugal for the consulate, as he fully paid for the consulate's expenses, which amounted to half a million dollars a year. In 2017, DePaço organized the first-ever raising of the Portuguese flag at a government building in Florida, at the Palm Coast City Hall.

In May 2020, DePaço resigned from his position as Honorary Consul, citing irreconcilable differences with the Portuguese Ambassador to the United States, Domingos Fezas Vital, on matters concerning Portuguese national interest and foreign policy, stating that "I leave because I cannot compromise my principles and I will not overlook unacceptable conduct".

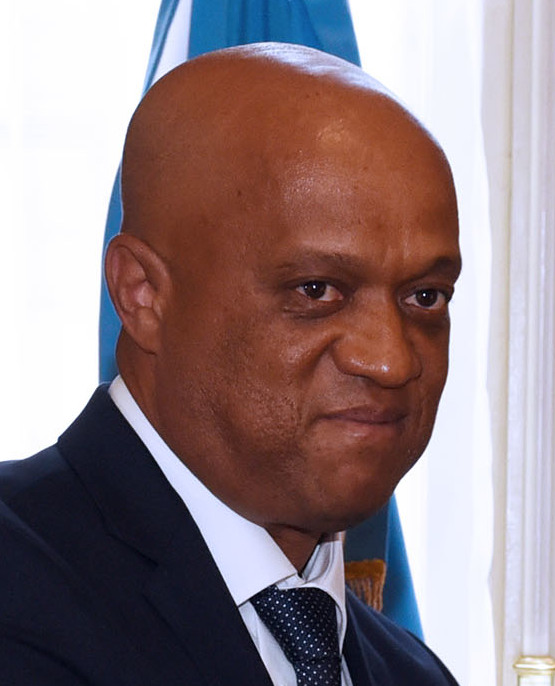
Cape Verdean foreign minister Luís Filipe Tavares resigned from his position after an investigation alleged that DePaço donated to Portugal's Chega party

On 11 January 2021, Portuguese news channel SIC Notícias broadcast a story asserting that DePaço had donated over ten thousand euros to Portugal's Chega party. This was controversial in Cape Verde due to Chega's opposition to immigration. The day after the SIC story was aired, Cape Verdean foreign minister Luís Filipe Tavares, who had recently appointed DePaço as Honorary Consul of Cape Verde to Florida, resigned due to the ensuing controversy. At the time he was appointed, Cape Verde already had a consul in Florida.

His wife, Deanna Padovani-DePaço, remains as honorary consul of Cape Verde to New Jersey as of 2021. In an article in January 2021, the newspaper A Nação questioned the case of a husband and wife being both appointed to as consuls, writing "This is the first time Cape Verde has ever nominated a couple, husband and wife, to consulates in the same country, at once, to different states in the U.S.A".

In late January 2021, DePaço's attorney Rui Barreira told Macao newspaper Ponto Final that DePaço was not dismissed from his position, but resigned on his own initiative on 12 January to avoid becoming a subject of controversy in Cabo Verde. Barreira asserted that DePaço paid for the consular activities out of his own pocket. He also said that DePaço's Wikipedia biographies had been the target of malicious editing.

In June 2021, Portuguese-American newspaper LusoAmericano reported that DePaço was suing media outlets Sábado magazine, CMTV and SIC for what he called "attacks on his honour and image, due to the imputation of false facts," specifically that he is the "main financier of Chega," alleging that this claim had come to overshadow his career in international business in the minds of the Portuguese public. DePaço said that he was never a financier of Chega, having made only one donation to the party within legal limits and otherwise uninvolved either as an activist or a party member. He also filed criminal complaints against Cofina, which owns Sábado and CMTV, Cofina director Eduardo Dâmaso and journalist Alexandre Malhado as well as SIC information directors Ricardo Costa and Marta Reis and journalist Pedro Coelho.

== Wikimedia legal affairs ==
In January 2021, DePaço's lawyer edited the Wikipedia article about him and threatened legal action if Wikipedia did not remove information DePaço considered fraudulent; this included the mention of DePaço's Chega donation. DePaço subsequently sued Wikipedia and editors. The Wikimedia Foundation characterized this as a strategic lawsuit against public participation. In December 2023, the Supreme Court of Portugal issued an order to Wikipedia demanding the removal of certain content that was deemed to be inaccurate. They also asked for the identification of the editors responsible for that content. On 25 January 2024, the Portuguese Supreme Court of Justice (STJ) reconfirmed the decision. According to Sábado magazine, the "Conference of judges maintained a decision taken in November 2023. Editors of the businessman's page could be revealed and subject to legal action." In April, an appeal by the WMF was rejected by the Constitutional Court.

On 4 August 2025, the Wikimedia Foundation announced compliance with local Portuguese court orders and subsequently removed content from the Wikipedia articles related to DePaço on both the English and Portuguese Wikipedia projects. Additionally, the IP and email addresses of eight involved Wikipedia editors were disclosed to DePaço, who stated that he would pursue further legal action against the editors. In response, Wikipedia editors added a new banner to the top of DePaço's article, informing readers that the removed content "must not be restored" and that "this article does not meet Wikipedia's standards for neutrality and comprehensiveness". The WMF has submitted another appeal of the order to the European Court of Human Rights.

The American libertarian think tank Cato Institute criticized the court order as an instance of censorship that "threatens the global internet" by enabling a European court to take down online speech worldwide.

== Football ==
In 2019, DePaço became an official patron of FC Porto, a major Portuguese football club. In 2020, DePaço became the owner and official patron of professional football club CF Canelas 2010.

== Personal life ==
As of 2022, he lives in New Jersey with his wife.
