= Florida Division of Emergency Management =

State-level agency in Florida, United States

Florida Division of Emergency Management (FDEM)

Agency overview
- Formed: 1969
- Jurisdiction: State of Florida
- Headquarters: Tallahassee, Florida
- Agency executives: Vacant, Executive Director; Keith Pruett, Deputy Executive Director; Stephanie Houp, Deputy Executive Director & General Counsel
- Parent agency: Executive Office of the Governor of Florida
- Website: www.floridadisaster.org

The Florida Division of Emergency Management (DEM) is charged with maintaining a comprehensive statewide program of emergency management of natural and man-made disasters. DEM is responsible for the State Emergency Response Team (SERT) which is composed of various intergovernmental entities, volunteers, and the private sector. The division coordinates the efforts of the Federal government with other departments and agencies of state government, with county and municipal governments and school boards, and with private agencies that have a role in emergency management. The Director is appointed by the Governor of Florida, and serves as an agency head. Kevin Guthrie previously served as the Director, having been appointed by Governor Ron DeSantis in May 2021 and resigning in August 2026.

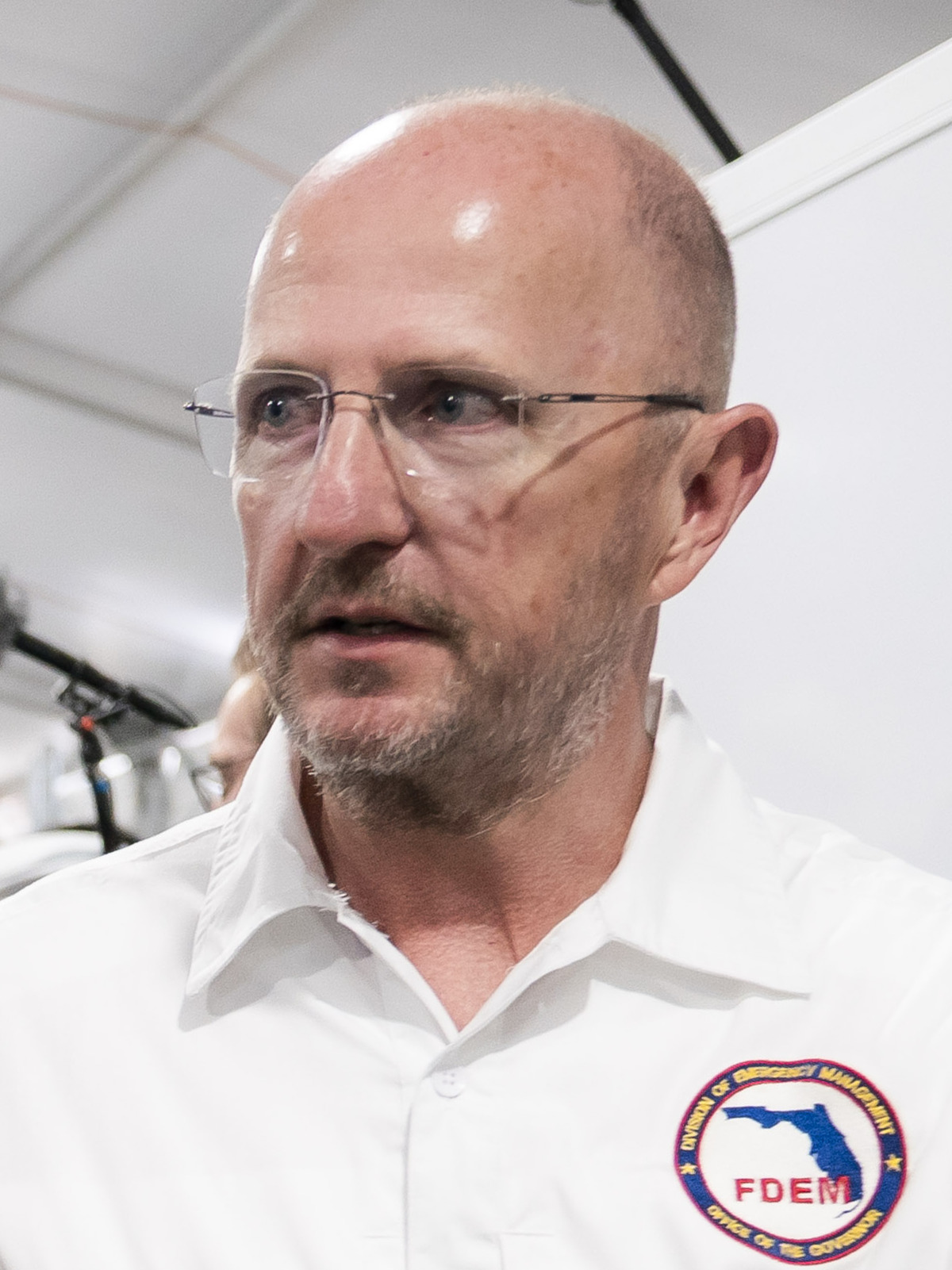
Former Director of Florida Division of Emergency Management, Kevin Guthrie, in 2025

The director oversees the day-to-day operations of the agency, including direct supervision of the functional areas tasked with Preparedness, Response, Recovery, Mitigation, and Finance and Administration.

Since 1969 the group, which later became the Division of Emergency Management, was within the Department of Community Affairs. However, pursuant to Chapter 2006–70, Laws of Florida, on July 1, 2006, the Division became a direct reporting entity to the Executive Office of the Governor (EOG) on a full-time basis and is now known as the Florida Division of Emergency Management, or FDEM. This allows the Division to report directly to the Executive Office of the Governor (EOG) and keep the same executive and management reporting structure as during an Executive Order and times of emergency.

== History ==
From the 1930s until the mid-1970s, financial assistance to victims of natural disasters came from a variety of federal programs. Recognizing the state's vulnerability to natural disasters, the Florida legislature responded in 1941 by enacting the Florida Civil Defense Council Act, Chapter 202.1.2 Florida Statutes. This Act preceded some ten years of general laws intended to regulate disaster preparedness. The 1941 Act authorized the Governor to establish a State Defense Council by proclamation in times of need or emergency. The Governor appointed members to the council and served as its chairman.

The council was to perform as a coordinating body for local, state and Federal civil defense activities. Use of existing facilities, and resources was emphasized as well as formation of defense councils at local levels of government. The council was authorized to establish regional and local councils as well as looking into interplay among emergency services providers. As part of its duties, the council was to make legislative recommendations to the Governor. Amendments to the law during 1942 left the original intent untouched.

In 1943, Florida Statute (F.S.) Chapter 21797 was enacted to deal with wartime civil defense needs. Law enforcement and fire services personnel were authorized to enter private property to enforce blackout, and air raid orders.

A separate act in the same year, F.S. 21763, provided for mobilization of fire services to serve the common defense in the event of war. This Act anticipated need for fire services beyond that available in a particular community and specified the rights, powers, and duties of firemen rendering aid outside jurisdictional boundaries.

The Florida Civil Defense Act was adopted in 1951.

The Civil Defense Advisory Board was created in 1965.

The state government was reorganized between 1965 and 1974.

In 1969 the Department of civil defense along with the state civil defense council and the Florida civil defense advisory board was transferred to the Department of Community Affairs. The Division of Emergency Government was created within the Department of Community Affairs.

The modern legislation under which Florida Emergency Management is derived was mostly passed between 1974 and 1979.

In 1984 the Florida Division of Emergency Management was created from a Bureau within the Division of Public Safety Planning and Assistance. This was based, in part, on a reorganization at the federal level in 1979.

In 1992 Hurricane Andrew struck South Florida, revealing the need for a redesign of Florida's emergency management operations. The department begins recruiting a new leadership team to head its Division of Emergency Management.

In March 1993 an unnamed superstorm impacted the entire state causing catastrophic damages in 38 counties. The storm demonstrated the vulnerability of Florida to natural disasters and ultimately led to the passage of the Emergency Management Preparedness and Assistance Trust Fund.

In 1994 Florida's newly created State Emergency Response Team became operational. For the first time in Florida's history, every state agency had been trained and equipped to work collaboratively during emergencies and to harness their resources to meet the needs of Florida's disaster victims.

In 1995 Florida's State Emergency Response Team operations responded when a line of hurricanes and tropical storms battered Florida within months of each other. Among them was Hurricane Opal, one of the ten costliest storms in the nation's history.

In 1996 after Hurricane Opal, Florida designed a Regional Hurricane Evacuation Plan intended to ensure a safe, timely and coordinated evacuation of Florida's most populous regions.

In 1997, DCA announced a $21 million plan, "Breaking the Cycle", that was intended to create disaster-resistant communities throughout the state.

In 1998, the Legislature authorized the Accidental Release Prevention and Risk Management Planning Act. This act implemented the Section 112 (r) of the Clean Air Act (1990) amendment. Florida was the only Emergency Management office in the country to seek delegation for this federal program.

In 1998 the Division received a federal grant that allowed for the purchase of a NOAA Weather Radio for every public school in Florida. The Broward County Emergency Operations Center in Plantation, Florida, was selected as the state's secondary command center.

In 1998 over 12,000 fire and emergency workers battled wildfires over the summer burning nearly 1/2 million acres (2000 km^{2}) of wild and urban lands. This event was called the most "complex" fire event in history.

In 1998 a landmark agreement for mass migration response was signed by Governor Chiles and the U.S. Immigration and Naturalization Commissioner.

On September 5, 2003, the State Emergency Response Team became the first state program in the nation to be fully accredited by the Emergency Management Accreditation Program (EMAP).

In 2004, Florida was struck by a record-setting four major hurricanes: Hurricane Charley, Hurricane Frances, Hurricane Ivan, Hurricane Jeanne and Tropical Storm Bonnie.

In 2006, Florida CEM implemented a common operating grid, USNG (civil counterpart to the Military Grid Reference System). This had a National impact; other emergency management agencies local, regional, state, and national begin to solve for a considerable deficiency in consequence management, a universal language of location.

=== Florida Civil Defense Act of 1951 ===
During 1951 the legislature expanded civil defense legislation to include response to and recovery from natural emergencies. This action was in response to lessons learned during a number of hurricanes that threatened or struck the state and an increase in population. The Florida Civil Defense Act of 1951, F.S. 26875, specifically recognized the responsibility of local government in emergency operations. It was consistent with national legislation, the Civil Defense Act of 1950, PL 920, which limited the role of the Federal government in civil defense matters. The Florida Act authorized establishment of a State department of Civil Defense, retaining a council consisting of the Governor and his cabinet to oversee activities of the new department. Although the department was responsible for coordinating activities, the council retained a position of authority to assume control of operations beyond local capability, entering into agreements with other states, directing local boards of health, and some regional matters. The council was provided emergency powers in the event of enemy attack.

The 1951 Act recognized the importance of the role of local government by directing that each county establish a civil defense council. Cities were authorized to take part in the county council or to establish separate councils. Each local council was authorized to appoint a director responsible for all civil defense functions within that political subdivision. Each political subdivision was authorized to spend funds and enter into contracts to provide for the health and safety of local residents in the event of a disaster. Each local organization was responsible for coordinating its plans with those of the state and Federal governments. The local councils were authorized to make, amend, and rescind orders, rules, and regulations found to be necessary for civil defense, consistent with actions of the state council. Orders, rules, and regulations of either the state or local councils had the force and effect of law when filed with the Secretary of State or local clerk of courts.

In the event of a natural disaster, the state council could make available to the affected area any equipment, services or facilities owned or operated by the state or local council. The state and local governments were not liable for damage to persons or property caused by civil defense activity. The legislation prohibited political activity by civil defense organizations.

=== Civil Defense Advisory Board ===
In 1965, (Chapter 65-504) a statewide Civil Defense Advisory Board was created to advise the Governor, Council, and Department Director on matters concerning civil defense. A section was also added which conferred on governing bodies of counties and municipalities the authority to declare a state of local emergency within their boundaries. The Governor was given similar power. The local state of emergency was not to exceed 48 hours but could be extended by the Governor. This legislation specifically dealt with emergencies and disasters resulting from natural or accidental causes. During the period of emergency the Governor and political subdivisions could do what was necessary to alleviate suffering and restore public facilities and services. The county civil defense director was charged with coordinating all matters involving civil defense within his county, and with acting as a liaison between the state and other local bodies.

=== State government reorganization ===
The state government was reorganized between 1965 and 1974. In 1969 the powers and duties of the Department of Civil Defense were transferred to the newly created Division of Emergency Government in the Department of Community Affairs (Chapter 69–106, Laws of Florida). The legislature also abolished the State Civil Defense Council and the Florida Civil Defense Advisory Board and transferred their functions to the Department of Community Affairs. Violations of provisions of the Civil Defense Act were made second degree misdemeanors.

=== Modern legislation (1974–1979) ===
During 1974, Chapter 252, Florida Statutes, was completely rewritten as the State Disaster Preparedness Act, and the Division of Emergency Government was renamed the Division of Disaster Preparedness (Chapter 74–285, Laws of Florida).

The 1974 Chapter 252 drafted by the Division of Emergency Government centralized authority at the state level. It reflected the thinking of staff that the effectiveness of the program would be improved by tighter management at the state level. They considered that more was known about "good management practices" or more effective ways to use emergency resources and funds. A state level organization would also be in a better position to learn more about the program and transmit it to the local level. Centralization would permit detailed standards, planning, and other requirements which the locals would have to comply with to be in conformance with the law.14 This approach was naive and unrealistic as was seen in later developments.

The 1974 Act provided the Division with substantial authority to supervise and control all and any problems arising from a disaster and to promulgate rules and regulations having the force of law. The Division was responsible for coordinating state, Federal and local activities. Detailed planning requirements and other prescriptive regulations were subsequently promulgated by the Division which also performed as a clearinghouse for information. There was no provision for local emergency powers. The authority to declare a local state of emergency was rescinded. All emergency powers were retained by the Governor. There was no restraint on political participation.

The Act required each political subdivision to create a local organization to support the State's program. The appointment of a local director was subject to state approval. A local director was responsible for coordinating all disaster preparedness functions within the county and serving as liaison with other local organizations. The Governor retained ultimate responsibility for both local and statewide disasters.

An amendment to the law in 1977 (Chapter 77–47, Laws of Florida) gave the Governor authority to use mobilize state forces to assist the private sector in clean-up and recovery measures during disaster/emergencies. There was no provision authorizing entrance onto private property.

In 1979 further reorganization took place and the Division of Disaster Preparedness became a bureau within the newly created Division of Public Safety Planning and Assistance (Chapter 79–190, Laws of Florida).

During 1980 legislation was enacted requiring local agencies to provide for voluntary registration of disabled citizens within the area (Chapter 80–191, Laws of Florida). The purpose of the registration was to determine who would need special assistance in the event of an emergency. The definition of the term "disabled" was never spelled out and counties were left to their own interpretation. As with other legislation and regulations promulgated during the period there were no provisions to make funds available for implementation.

Of some consequence, in response to a challenge of the provisions of the 1974 Act concerning local disaster preparedness directors, the Attorney General (AGO 76–84) rendered an opinion that the director was responsible only to the governing body of the county and the Division of Disaster Preparedness, and could not be placed under supervision of an intermediate county official. This opinion is in consonance with and supported by the stated purpose of the legislation "to provide effective and orderly governmental control and coordination of emergency operations in disasters and emergencies." (FS 252.38) This opinion gets to the very basics of emergency management-continuity of government as the bottom line for the entire program.

In addition to the immediate physical safety of humans, authority granted to the Florida Governor related to declarations of a state of emergency impacts state operations such as the issuance of development orders and building permits.

== Past directors ==
1. Robert Wilkerson, January 1977 – December 1982
2. Gordon Guthrie, 1982–1992
3. Joseph F. Myers, 1993–2001
4. W. Craig Fugate, 2001–2009
5. Ruben D. Almaguer, 2009–2010
6. David Halstead, 2010–2011
7. Bryan Koon, 2011–2017
8. Wes Maul, 2017–2019
9. Jared Moskowitz, 2019–2021
10. Kevin Guthrie, 2021–2026
11. Jared W. Perdue 2026

== See also ==
- Civil defense
- Stafford Disaster Relief and Emergency Assistance Act
- Emergency management
- Incident Command System
- Tropical cyclone
- Florida County Emergency Management Agencies
  - Brevard County Emergency Management
  - Flagler County Emergency Management
