= Codys Corner, Florida =

Codys Corner, Florida Codyville, Cody's Corner
- Unincorporated area
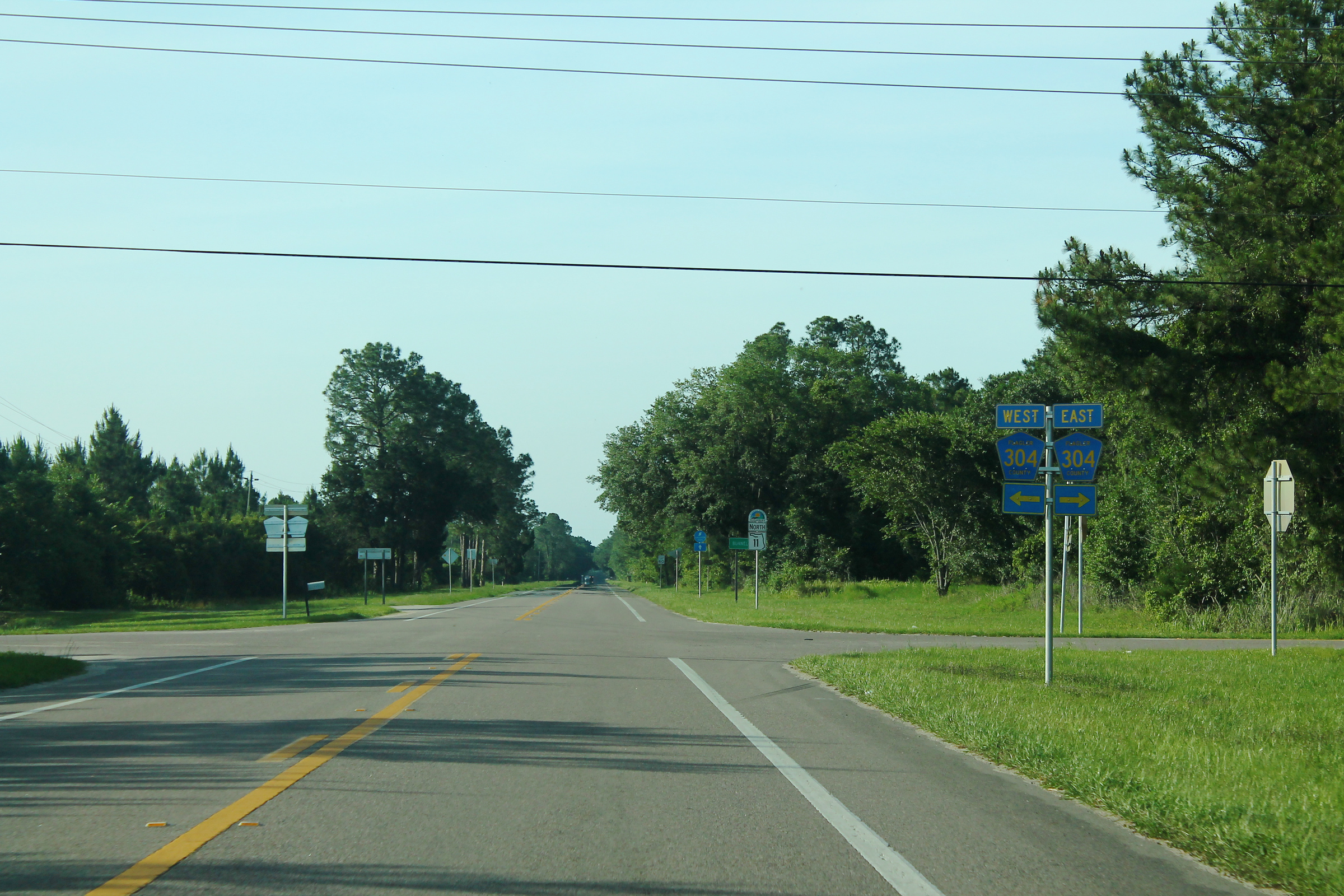
- Northbound FL 11 at CR 304 at Codys Corner

- Location within Florida
- Coordinates: 29°20′36″N 81°18′39″W
- Country: United States
- State: Florida
- County: Flagler
- Elevation: 16 ft (4.9 m)
- Time zone: UTC-5 (Eastern (EST))
  - Summer (DST): UTC-4

Codys Corner is a populated place in Flagler County, Florida, United States.

== Geography ==
The community is at the intersection of Dupont Road and State Road 11 southwest of Bunnell in Flagler County, Florida.

Much of the area around Codys Corner is dedicated preserve land, including the Relay Tract Conservation Easements just east of the community.

== History ==
Codys Corner was named in 1907 by Richard Cody, Sr., who was a local farmer. In the early days, Codys Corner was also known as Codyville and this is the name it appeared under during the 1932 US Geological Survey. During the 1920 census, just 2,444 people lived in Flagler County, and it was noted that settlement in the county was "densest...between the Dean Road, Codyville, and Lake Diston".

By the 1950s, Codys Corner, now established under that name, was noted for its irrigation wells, along with St. Johns Park and Bunnell. The Florida Geological Survey stated that most of the ground water pumped in the county came from artesian wells in these three areas.

There is a general store named Cody's Corner which has been in the area since the 1970s; this was originally a convenience store. In the 1990s, this store was noted by the Northwest Florida Daily News as the only store in Codys Corner.

In 1998, Codys Corner experienced severe wildfires, part of the 1998 Florida wildfires, forcing a mandatory evacuation. Some residents of the community refused to leave, unwilling or unable to leave their homes behind. By July, all residents of Flagler County were under a mandatory evacuation order.

The community experienced another natural disaster in 2004, when power lines and trees were downed during Hurricane Jeanne.
