= Honorary Consulate of Portugal, Florida =

Honorary Consulate of Portugal in Palm Coast
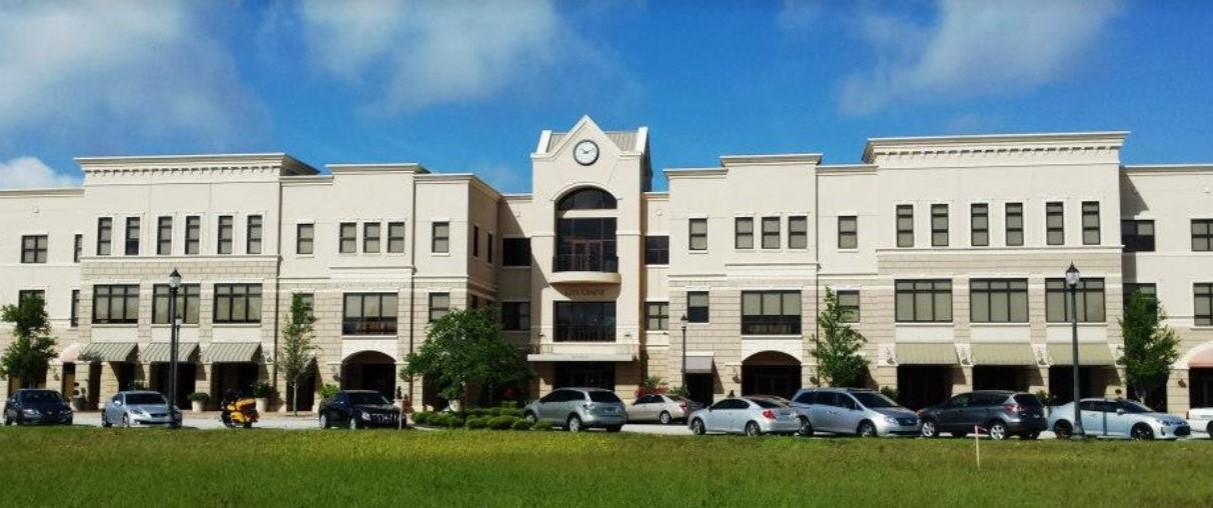
- Location: Palm Coast, Florida, United States
- Address: 145 City Place; Palm Coast, Florida 32164; United States
- Inaugurated: October 3, 2014
- Closed: May 14, 2020

The Honorary Consulate of Portugal in Palm Coast was an ad honorem diplomatic mission of Portugal in Florida, United States. Based in Palm Coast, the honorary consulate had jurisdiction over the State of Florida. The first and only honorary consul was Caesar DePaço, from 2014 to 2020.

== History ==
The honorary consulate was created on October 3, 2014, with the appointment of Portuguese businessman Caesar DePaço as the "Consul ad honorem of the Portuguese Republic in the State of Florida". The honorary consulate's premises were opened in April 2015.

Since 2015, the honorary consulate has helped to organize the Portugal Day celebrations each year on Palm Coast. At the 2017 celebrations, the honorary consul raised the Portuguese flag at a government building, for the first time in the history of Florida.

In May 2020, DePaço resigned from his position of Honorary Consul, saying in a released statement that there was "incompatibility with the Portuguese Ambassador to the United States of America". A report by the television network SIC was released in January 2021 detailing DePaço's involvement with the far-right political party Chega, with the report also noting that DePaço's wife had also been appointed Honorary Consul during his term, but for the US state of New Jersey. Following this report, the Minister of Foreign Affairs of Cape Verde, Luís Filipe Tavares, resigned.
