= Favoretta, Florida =

Unincorporated community in Florida, U.S.

Coordinates: 29°22′01″N 81°10′29″W

Favoretta is an unincorporated community located in Flagler County, Florida, United States. It is located southwest of Korona on the west side of US 1. The community is part of the Deltona–Daytona Beach–Ormond Beach, FL metropolitan statistical area.

The community, once a lumber camp, is also spelled as "Favorita".
