= AdventHealth Palm Coast =

AdventHealth Palmcoast
- AdventHealth

Geography
- Location: 60 Memorial Medical Parkway, Palm Coast, Florida, United States
- Coordinates: 29.4758°N 81.1895°W

Organization
- Care system: Private hospital
- Type: General hospital
- Religious affiliation: Seventh-day Adventist Church
- Affiliated university: Jacksonville University and University of North Florida

Services
- Standards: Joint Commission
- Emergency department: Yes
- Beds: 99

Helipads
- Helipad: Aeronautical chart and airport information for 61FD at SkyVector

History
- Former names: Bunnell Medical Clinic; Bunnell General Hospital; Bunnell Community Hospital; Memorial Hospital-Flagler; Florida Hospital Flagler
- Opened: 1960 and September 22, 2002

Links
- Website: www.adventhealth.com/hospital/adventhealth-palm-coast
- Lists: Hospitals in Florida

Memorial Hospital Flagler, Inc. (doing business as AdventHealth Palm Coast) is a non-profit hospital campus in Palm Coast, Florida, United States. It became part of AdventHealth following a merger with Memorial Health Systems in May 2000. AdventHealth Palm Coast became the first hospital built in Flagler County and it is also the second largest employer in the county. The medical facility is a tertiary, statutory rural hospital and primary stroke center that has multiple specialties. In late March 2025, AdventHealth Palm Coast was designated an Age-Friendly Emergency Department by the American College of Emergency Physicians, with a Level 3 Geriatric Emergency Department Accreditation.

== History ==
=== 1951-1989 ===
In 1951, Dr. John Canakaris' opened Bunnell Medical Clinic with 5 beds. And later the clinic increased the number of beds to 22. In 1960, Bunnell Medical Clinic became Bunnell General Hospital with 60 beds. In 1977, Bunnell Community Hospital with 80 hospital beds was built.

Later Hospital Corporation of America purchased the hospital and renamed it Memorial Hospital-Flagler.

In 1989, a diesel fuel spill occurred at the hospital. Soon after the Florida Department of Environmental Protection ordered Memorial Hospital-Flagler that both of its underground fuel tanks had to be taken off of its property.

=== 2000-2012 ===
In late May 2000, Memorial Health Systems chose to merge with Adventist Health System. It had to be approved by both of the hospital networks boards, and by regulators from Florida and the federal government.

In September 2002, Memorial Hospital-Flagler moved to Palm Coast and was renamed Florida Hospital Flagler. On September 22, Florida Hospital Flagler opened with 81 hospital beds and cost $67 million to build.

In October 2002, the only YMCA in Flagler County opened by renting 6,500 square foot (600 m^{2}) inside of Florida Hospital Flagler. On May 31, 2011, it closed after losing $50,000 for three consecutive years.

On September 23, 2012, Florida Hospital Flagler celebrated its tenth anniversary being in Palm Coast. In early December, Kangaroo Express donated $110,000 to Florida Hospital Pink Army for its fight against breast cancer. Florida Hospital Flagler received about $37,000 of that money donated.

=== 2013-2019 ===
On August 1, 2013, during a special meeting Flagler County commissioners voted 4-to-1 to purchase the former Memorial Hospital-Flagler for $1.23 million. The reason why the county wanted the former hospital was for a new location for the Flagler County Sheriff's Office. On September 21, the purchase of the former hospital was finalized.

On November 11, 2015, Florida Hospital Flagler announced that it was adding 32 beds and would ask for licenses for 16 current overflow beds. The number of beds would be increased from 99 beds to 147 beds and would add a second story above the emergency department. The expansion will cost $15 million. On February 15, 2016, Florida Hospital Flagler had a groundbreaking for the 18,500 square foot (1,720 m^{2}) expansion. The expansion of the hospital was completed in the fall.

In late January 2016, Florida Hospital Flagler announced that it would expand its cancer center by 2,000 square foot (190 m^{2}) for $4.5 million. On July 11, Florida Hospital Flagler broke ground on the expansion of its cancer center. In early March 2017, the expanded cancer center opened. Florida Hospital Flagler became the first hospital in the area to have the True Beam Radiotherapy System by Varian Medical Systems.

On November 19, 2018, Florida Hospital Flagler announced that it was purchasing 6 acres (2.4 ha) from Flagler County for $175,000. It is located by Interstate 95 and Matanzas High School. It planned on building a 12-bed emergency department and a two-story medical office building for a total of $25 million. Later plans for the ER were dropped and AdventHealth Palm Coast Parkway was built instead. On January 2, 2019, Florida Hospital Flagler rebranded to AdventHealth Palm Coast.

=== 2021-present ===
On January 1, 2021, all hospitals were required to have their chargemaster on its website by the Centers for Medicare & Medicaid Services. In early February 2023, almost all of the AdventHealth hospitals had their chargemaster on their website, including AdventHealth Palm Coast.

In September 2021, AdventHealth Palm Coast had a simulation center built by renovating some of its offices. The renovation and the equipment for the simulation center cost a total of $1 million. It opened on April 22, 2022, and is the largest in the AdventHealth Central Florida Division. Its five classrooms will train about 140 AdventHealth nurses each month from Jacksonville University and the University of North Florida.

On July 11, 2023, AdventHealth Palm Coast announced that it would have a new $30 million cancer center built on campus. The 30,000 square foot (2,800 m^{2}), two story building would be built on Florida State Road 100. On October 26, there was a groundbreaking for Freytag Health Plaza, and Robins & Morton was hired to build the facility. On March 19, 2024, there was a topping out of the building. The Freytag Cancer Center started treating patients in mid November and the hospital had a grand opening for the building on January 16, 2025. It was named after a local couple who donated money, and it was designed by HuntonBrady Architects

== Crimes ==
On October 13, 2019, Kelsey Anderson sent a message to his domestic partner on Facebook and called her; that he would come to AdventHealth Palm Coast and shoot her dead, and fellow employees that she worked with. The hospital immediately called 911 at 12:15 p.m. and went on lockdown. He was later arrested at 8:30 p.m. in Bunnell, at Hidden Trails Community Park. Anderson was charged with a second-degree felony.

On June 15, 2021, Kory Prusaitis got mad at the hospital when his mother could not be in the emergency room with him. He hit the top of the head of a man and punched another person in the forehead who tried to stop him. Later in the parking lot Prusaitis punched a security guard, who then detained him with handcuffs until the police arrived. He was taken to the Sheriff Perry Hall Inmate Detention Facility, and was charged with 2 counts of simple battery, and one felony battery on an elderly person older than 65.

On January 1, 2024, Robert Goldstein was arrested at AdventHealth Palm Coast after he had pinned an employee against a wall. He was charged with assault on a healthcare worker and also for battery of a child at Walmart. On January 17, Goldstein's bail bond was denied. On July 28, Anthony Romine was taken to AdventHealth Palm Coast for treatment for an injury by the police (the injury was faked by the prisoner), the inmate later escaped from the hospital. This caused the hospital to go on lockdown for the safety of its employees and patients. Seven hours later he was arrested by the police and taken back to the Sheriff Perry Hall Inmate Detention Facility.

== Services ==
In early April 2012, it became the first hospital in Florida to offer Third Eye colonoscopy.

== Charity giving ==
In early August 2017, Florida Hospital Flagler, donated stationery and medical supplies to the Jewish Federation of Volusia and Flagler County.

== Hurricane evacuation ==
On October 5, 2016, Florida Hospital Flagler was evacuated due to Hurricane Matthew, it moved patients by ambulance to other Florida Hospital facilities.

== Off campus facilities ==
In July 2011, Florida Hospital Flagler purchased 3 acres (1.2 ha) in the Cobblestone Village located by Golden Corral. On September 28, it had a groundbreaking for the 34,000 square foot (3,200 m^{2}) Florida Hospital Flagler Medical Plaza. On July 10, 2012, the outpatient clinic opened for $15 million.

On August 2, 2024, AdventHealth Palm Coast purchased 11.04 acres (4.47 ha) for $5.7 million in St. Augustine, Florida, on Florida State Road 207 and 1.6 miles (2.6 km) northeast of Interstate 95. On March 25, 2025, there was a groundbreaking for a 12-bed emergency department on the site. On July 13, 2026, the 16,116 square foot (1,497.2 m^{2}) AdventHealth Treaty Oaks ER opened for $20 million, it was built by Robins & Morton and designed by HuntonBrady Architects.

== Awards and recognitions ==
=== Healthcare Information and Management Systems Society ===
In late December 2011, Florida Hospital Flagler became the first in Florida to receive the HIMSS Analytics Stage 7 Award for its electronic health record.

=== The Leapfrog Group ===
The hospital received a grade A from The Leapfrog Group from fall 2013 to spring 2015, it received a grade B in November 2016 and spring 2017. It received a grade A again in fall 2017, 2018, 2019, spring 2020, 2021 and 2026.

=== Healthgrades ===
AdventHealth Palm Coast was recognized by Healthgrades with its America's 250 Best Hospital Award in 2025 and 2026.

=== U.S. News & World Report ===
In late July 2025, U.S. News & World Report recognized the medical facility as the third best hospital in the Deltona-Daytona Beach-Ormond Beach metropolitan area.

=== Forbes ===
On December 4, 2025, AdventHealth Palm Coast was recognized by Forbes in its new Top Hospitals list with a four-star ranking.

=== Centers for Medicare & Medicaid Services ===
On May 13, 2026, the medical facility received from the Centers for Medicare & Medicaid Services a five-star rating.

== See also ==
- List of Seventh-day Adventist hospitals
- List of stroke centers in the United States
