= Florida State Road 10A =

Florida State Road 10A may refer to:

- Florida State Road 10A (Lake City), the only signed SR 10A
- Florida State Road 10A (Jacksonville), the unsigned designation for the Arlington Expressway
- Florida State Road 10A (Pensacola), the unsigned designation for US 90 north of Pensacola
- Florida State Road 10A (former), several former alignments that are now county roads

Browse numbered routes
← SR 10	FL	→ SR 11
