= Daytona North, Florida =

Unincorporated community in Florida, U.S.

Coordinates: 29°27′8.64″N 81°23′57.54″W

Daytona North is an unincorporated community in Flagler County, Florida, United States. It is located south of State Road 100 and west of County Road 305, west of Bunnell. The community is part of the Deltona–Daytona Beach–Ormond Beach, FL metropolitan statistical area. Its population was around 2,800 in 2010. Population data is difficult to ascertain, because the population data for this community is aggregated with all of the data for Flagler County's unincorporated data. Using Census Block data, one can count the population for the specific area to arrive at the general population of 2,800.

The lot sizes in the area vary between a half acre to an acre-and-a-half. The community contains a mixture of low-to-medium-income families. Some of the housing structures in the area include single-wide, double-wide and triple-wide trailers; manufactured homes; concrete-stucco homes; and wood-frame homes with vinyl siding. Other than the main county roads, the residential roads in this area are unpaved dirt with the exception of about five streets. There is ample farmland surrounding the area, much of which produces sod and some cattle. Cabbage and potatoes are common crops in the region.

There are two churches within the immediate region of Daytona North. The Westside Baptist Church is located on the paved portion of Canal Avenue, which extends off of C.R. 302. Flagler West Community Church is located on C.R. 305, slightly west of the community. Grace Community Food Pantry visits the Hidden Trails Community Center on certain Saturdays of the month to bring food to many of the lower-income citizens of this community.

Daytona North, as an unincorporated community, has representation at the county level. As such, the area once had an advisory board to act as a liaison between the people and the county government; however, the advisory board dissolved and the county commissioner began Town Hall meetings to meet directly with the people.
