= AdventHealth Palm Coast Parkway =

- AdventHealth

Geography
- Location: 1 AdventHealth Way, Palm Coast, Florida, United States
- Coordinates: 29°33′7.09″N 81°14′38.65″W

Organization
- Care system: Private hospital
- Type: General hospital
- Religious affiliation: Seventh-day Adventist Church

Services
- Standards: Joint Commission
- Emergency department: Yes
- Beds: 100

Helipads
- Helipad: Aeronautical chart and airport information for 1FD0 at SkyVector

History
- Constructed: September 2, 2021
- Opened: August 2, 2023

Links
- Website: www.adventhealth.com/hospital/adventhealth-palm-coast-parkway
- Lists: Hospitals in Florida

AdventHealth Palm Coast Parkway, Inc. is a non-profit hospital campus in Palm Coast, Florida, United States owned by AdventHealth. The medical facility is a tertiary and primary stroke center that has multiple specialties. In 2025, the hospital fired an employee for pretending to be a registered nurse.

== History ==
On November 19, 2018, Florida Hospital Flagler announced that it was purchasing 6 acres (2.4 ha) of land from Flagler County for $175,000. It is located by Interstate 95 and Matanzas High School. It planned on building a 12-bed emergency department and a two-story medical office building for a total of $25 million. Later plans for the ER were dropped.

On January 19, 2021, AdventHealth announced that it was building a new $100 million, 153,000 square foot (14,200 m^{2}), four-story hospital in Palm Coast, Florida with 100 private beds. The cost grew to $167 million. It expected that the new hospital would create 300 to 500 full-time jobs, in addition to the 1,100 at AdventHealth Palm Coast. In late April, by a vote of 7-to-0, the Planning and Land Development Regulation Board approved rezoning the 11 acres (4.5 ha) site. In early May, the Palm Coast City Council approved the construction of AdventHealth Palm Coast Parkway and a medical office building. The Palm Coast City Council made zoning changes to the district since it limited the height of buildings to 50-foot to allow the 80-foot tall hospital. On September 2, there was a virtual groundbreaking for the new building. On September 14, Robins & Morton began construction of the hospital.

On May 24, 2022, there was a topping out of AdventHealth Palm Coast Parkway. On July 31, 2023, construction was completed. On August 2, the hospital opened with a grand opening. The hospital's design was led by HuntonBrady Architects. It opened next to a 30,000 square foot (2,800 m^{2}) medical office building which opened on June 2, 2023.

After being open for one year, the emergency department at AdventHealth Palm Coast Parkway had treated 30,000 people, had 5,300 inpatient visits, and had 16,700 outpatient visits. The new hospital hired 650 employees.

== Nurse imposter ==
On July 3, 2023, Autumn Bardisa was hired by AdventHealth as an advanced nurse technician. She told AdventHealth that she had finished her education, and that she still had to take the required state exam to be a licensed registered nurse. She later told them that she had passed the exam and gave AdventHealth her license number, when they looked at it they noticed that the last name was different. To explain the discrepancy they required Bardisa to provide a marriage license to prove that she had changed her last name. Bardisa later took the required residency program with AdventHealth.

In January 2025, she was up for a promotion as a charge nurse, this intrigued a fellow employee who did some investigating and found out that she was really a certified nursing assistant with an expired license. On January 22, Autumn Bardisa was fired for impersonating a registered nurse and giving false documents. From June 2024, until her termination, she had treated 4,486 patients at AdventHealth Palm Coast Parkway. After the firing the Flagler County Sheriff's Office began an investigation into Bardisa, after the hospital reported to them that she had been impersonating a registered nurse. Also the Florida Department of Health and the U.S. Department of Health and Human Services joined the investigation; they interviewed employees at the hospital and the nurse from the other AdventHealth hospital that she was impersonating.

On February 18, 2025, Bardisa passed the state exam and received a license to become a registered nurse. On August 5, the Flagler County Sheriff's Office got an arrest warrant for Autumn Bardisa, she was apprehended at her Palm Coast home and was taken to the Sheriff Perry Hall Inmate Detention Facility. The police are charging her with seven counts of practicing health care profession without a license and seven counts of fraudulent use of personal identification information. On August 9, she was released from jail after paying a $70,000 bail. On August 22, Bardisa was arraigned in court and charged with one count of unlicensed practice of health care profession and one count of fraudulant use of personal identification information.

On April 7, 2026, she was put on probation for 60 months after pleading no contest. As part of her plea deal Bardisa is required to do 50 hours of community service, and write a letter of apology to the nurse that she impersonated. During probation she is forbidden from being a registered nurse and certified nursing assistant. It will be up to the Florida Department of Health if she practices again.

== Awards and recognitions ==
AdventHealth Palm Coast Parkway received from The Leapfrog Group a grade A twice in 2026.

== See also ==
- List of Seventh-day Adventist hospitals
