= 1998 Florida wildfires =

1998 wildfies in Florida

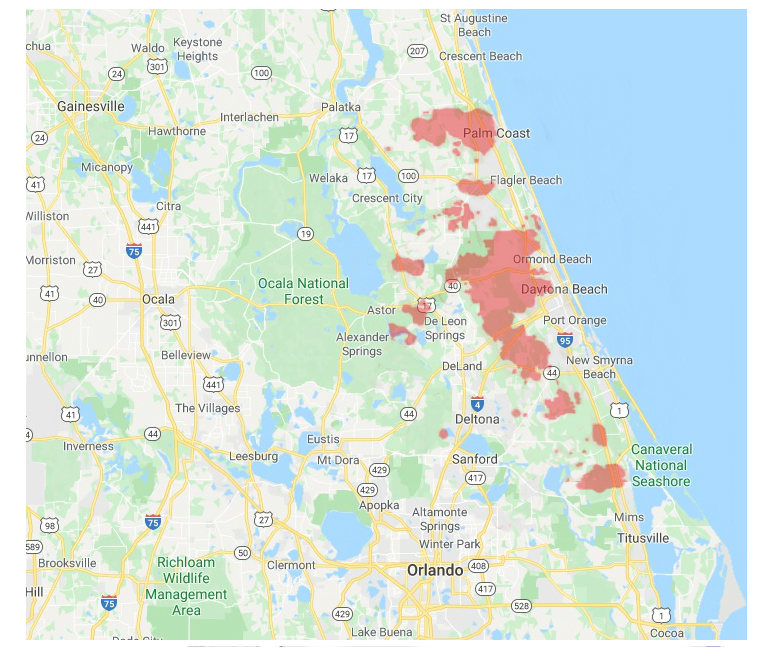
- 1998 Florida wildfires
- Date: May to July 1998

Statistics
- Burned area: 500,000 acres (200,000 ha)

Impacts
- Deaths: 1
- Structures destroyed: 150
- Cost: >$300,000,000 in timber alone.

Ignition
- Cause: Lightning

The 1998 Florida wildfires, sometimes referred to as the Florida Firestorm, was a wildfire event involving several thousand separate woodland and mixed urban-rural wildfires which wrought severe damage during the summer months of 1998. Wildfires sparked mainly by lightning threatened to converge into single, vast blazes, crossed natural firebreaks such as rivers and interstate highways, and demanded an unprecedented suppression response of firefighting resources from across the country. Regular activities such as Fourth of July celebrations, sporting events, tourism, and daily life were profoundly interrupted for millions of residents and visitors in the northeastern part of the state.

== Background ==
Florida had historically been considered as an area of lower susceptibility for wildfires, due to its high humidity and rainfall levels. An El Niño during the winter of 1998 produced above-average rainfall, which enabled extensive growth of underbrush and vegetation in the state's forests. In early April, however, the rains came to an abrupt halt, and the ensuing drought lasted until July. These months of continuing dry conditions saw the drought index rise to 700 (out of 800), indicating wildfire potential similar to that usually found in the western states like California.

Exacerbating the wildfire risk was that development in Florida had proceeded with many new communities being built on former rural, wooded properties, often with heavy vegetation within feet of structures, and without municipal water systems and fire hydrants.

== Fires ==
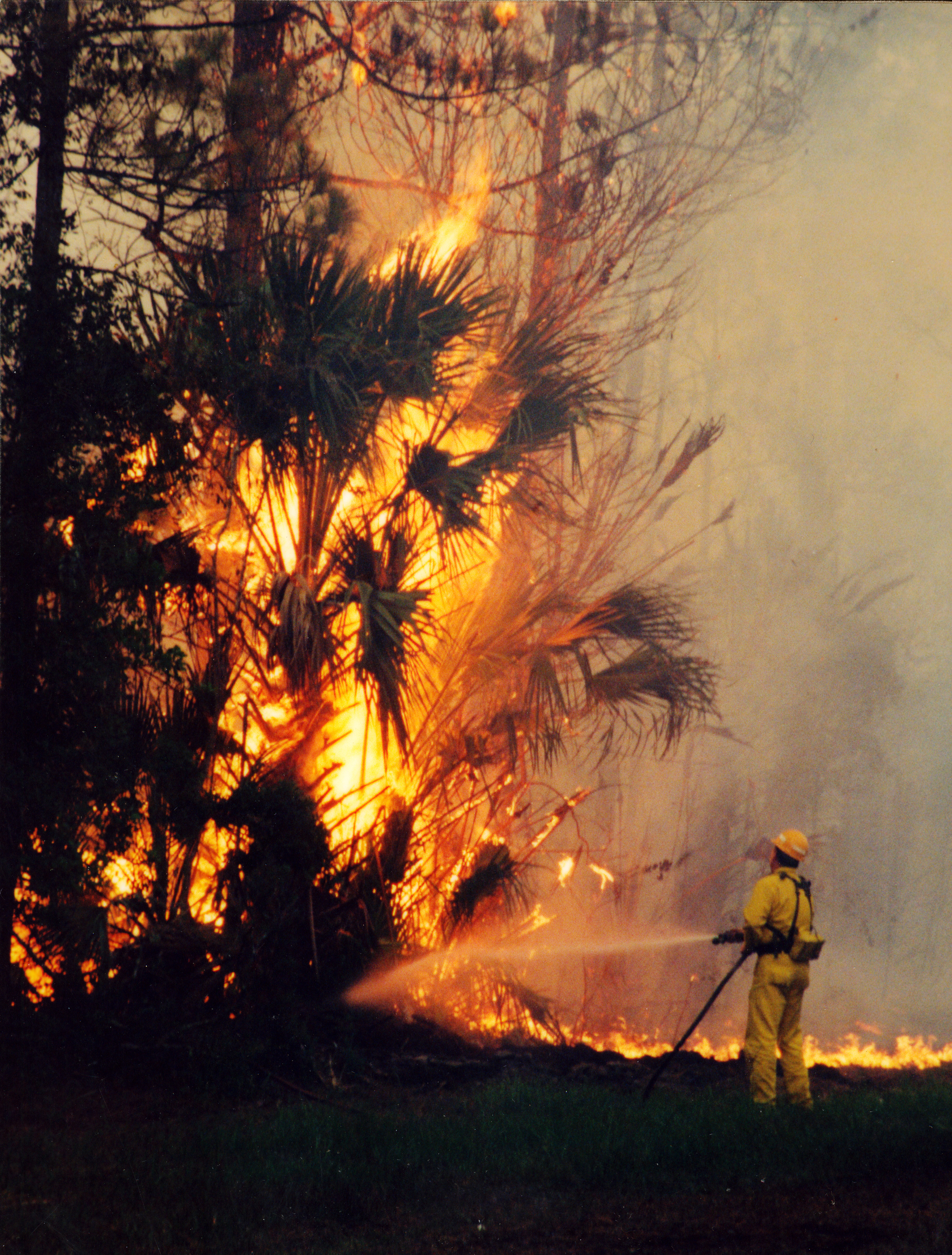
Wildfire on State Road #11, near Bunnell, Florida

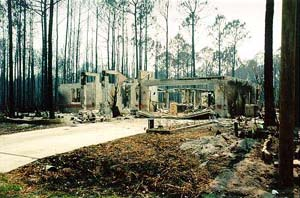
One of over 100 burned homes

The fires began in mid-May, most started by lightning strikes. Whatever rain came with the thunderstorms was inadequate to prevent or stop the fires. In late May and early June, numerous separate fires were igniting in Brevard, Osceola, Orange, Seminole, St. John's, Flagler, and Volusia counties, near the communities of Flagler Estates, Daytona Beach, and Palm Coast. The Big Bend region also experienced major fires in the Apalachicola and Osceola National Forests. With dry conditions persisting and alarm over the fires growing, on June 7, Governor Lawton Chiles declared a state of emergency. By mid-June, fires burning near I-95 forced its closure in the area. During the middle two weeks of June, each day saw the fires grow larger and everyday life more interrupted, and on June 25, in consideration of the upcoming Independence Day celebration, the Governor declared all sales and possession of fireworks illegal. Friday and Saturday, June 26 and 27 saw some abatement of conditions with the arrival of rain, and Monday the 28th, Federal agencies brought in firefighting resources including helicopters and fixed-wing aircraft. By July 1, however, increasing winds once again worsened conditions, and the firebreak of I-95 was soon jumped as embers were blown eastward from fires burning in woodlands west of the interstate. By July 4, 135 miles of I-95 from Jacksonville to Titusville was closed, and Division of Forestry models indicated that several fires could merge into one conflagration stretching from Daytona to St. Augustine. The entire population of Flagler County, some 35,000 residents, was ordered to evacuate. The Pepsi 400, usually held at Daytona International Speedway on the Fourth of July weekend, was postponed. That was the day that news media, learning that firefighters were short of bandanas used as protective face covers, mistakenly sent out the call for as many bananas as could be supplied, and firefighters were inundated with truckloads of the fruit. On July 5, the tide finally turned as rains and humidity increased. By mid-July, with most fires under control, over 2000 individual wildfires had burned in Florida, destroying nearly 500,000 acres, 150 structures, and 86 vehicles.

== Response ==
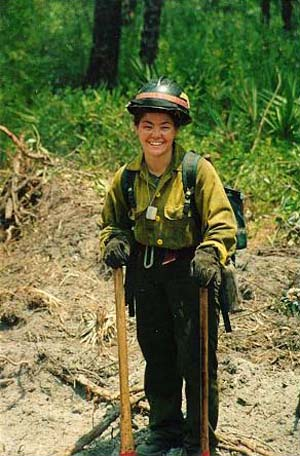
A firefighter responding in Wakulla County

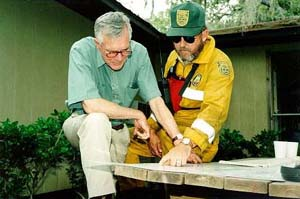
Governor Lawton Chiles at Putnam County EOC

The response to the fires was unprecedented at the time, involving local, state, and federal resources and as many as 10,000 firefighters from across the United States. The Army, Marines and National Guard brought in personnel and equipment, and five hotshot firefighting teams participated. Sikorsky Skycranes, a Canadair "Superscooper" from North Carolina and numerous other aircraft participated directly in firefighting. Public Health Departments in several counties opened special needs shelters, while the Salvation Army and Red Cross opened general shelters. County Emergency Operations Centers were at high alert, coordinating the efforts of firefighters, law enforcement, environmental health, transportation officials, communications specialists and amateur radio operators. At one point, even a local concrete company volunteered into service, using its trucks to transport water from a hydrant to a drying pond from which aircraft were picking up water. Governor Lawton Chiles was quoted as saying, "we have about half of the country's firefighting assets in Florida right now."

== Aftermath ==
Losses from the fires were widespread and disastrous. Over 150 homes and structures were lost, and the Federal Emergency Management Agency issued a report stating that over $300 million of Florida's timber resources had burned. On July 4, The New York Times reported that firefighting efforts up to that day had amounted to $80 million. In the ensuing years, public and government attitudes regarding prescribed burning changed, with nearly ninety thousand authorizations annually allowing property owners and agencies to burn over two million acres annually. There have also been efforts to increase the presence of municipal hydrants in communities. No deaths were directly attributed to the wildfires, but the crew of one responding aircraft, a Sikorsky Skycrane, was tragically lost 25 miles from its destination enroute home when it developed a mechanical failure.
