= Florida State Road 11 =

Highway in Florida, US

State Road 11
- SR 11 highlighted in red

Route information
- Maintained by FDOT
- Length: 29.793 mi (47.947 km)
- Existed: 1945 renumbering (definition)–present

Major junctions
- South end: US 17 near DeLand
- SR 40 near Barberville
- North end: US 1 / SR 100 in Bunnell

Location
- Country: United States
- State: Florida
- Counties: Volusia, Flagler

Highway system
- Florida State Highway System; Interstate; US; State; Former; Pre‑1945; Toll; Scenic
← SR 10A	→ SR 12

State Road 11 (SR 11) is a north–south route in Flagler and Volusia Counties, running from US 17 north of DeLand to US 1 in Bunnell.

== Route description ==
State Road 11 begins at US 17 near Lake Molly in northern DeLand as a one-way street until it reaches Glenwood Road which is also part of SR 11 east of US 17. The road takes a slight curve to the right where it passes a former segment known as Old Perkins Highway, then curves back north. It briefly becomes a two-lane divided highway as it intersects with CR 15A, where southbound access to that route contains a long south-to-west turning ramp, and a short east-to-south turning ramp.

Throughout much of its existence, SR 11 serves as the western border for the Tomoka Wildlife Management Area Union-Camp Tract. This includes three other former sections of the road, the first of which is used by Lake Dias Park and diagonally across from the north end of that, a private driveway that was once part another segment of Old Perkins Highway. The north end of that segment of Old Perkins Highway is encountered later on. Telephone poles along the road veer to the right along yet another former section of the road just south of the point where it intersects with State Road 40 in DeLeon Springs. The road takes one last curve to the northeast and becomes Moody Boulevard as it enters Bunnell. It passes by the Old Bunnell State Bank Building near the crossing of the Florida East Coast Railway main line before it finally terminates at US 1 and State Road 100. Here, Moody Boulevard continues onto SR 100 which is the southern terminus of the US 1/SR 100 overlap.

== History ==
According to the 1945 great renumbering, State Road 11 was defined as a replacement for former State Roads 143 and 28. The segment west and south of US 1 was SR 143, while the segment east of US 1 was SR 28. The route was defined as follows;

"From the intersection with SR 15 and 40 approximately two miles North of DeLand and in a Northerly direction to the East City Limits of Bunnell then East to the intersection with SR 1 in Flagler Beach."

State Road 11 also included the segment of State Road 100 east of US 1 until 1970.

== Major intersections ==
County	Location	mi	km	Destinations	Notes
Volusia		0.000	0.000	US 17 (SR 15) / Glenwood Road (CR 4088 west) – DeLand, DeLeon Springs	
Volusia		2.376	3.824	CR 15A south (North Spring Garden Avenue) – Orlando	County extension of SR 15A. DeLand truck route.
Volusia		11.586	18.646	SR 40 to I-95 – Barberville, Ormond Beach, Volusia Speedway	
Flagler	Cody's Corner	20.286	32.647	CR 304 – Seville	
Flagler	Bunnell	29.793	47.947	US 1 / SR 100 (State Street / East Moody Boulevard / SR 5) – St. Augustine, Palatka, Daytona Beach	
1.000 mi = 1.609 km; 1.000 km = 0.621 mi
