= Brevard Emergency Operations Center =

The Brevard Emergency Operations Center (EOC) provides Homeland Security for Brevard County, Florida.

The EOC coordinates information regarding the occurrence or threat of any disaster or emergency threatening the safety of the County residents. The EOC uses telephone, television, and the Emergency Services of the County Sheriff, the City Police and Fire Departments to provide coordinated management of all services for cataclysmic events such as Hurricanes, Floods and Terrorism.

In cooperation with police and fire departments, Patrick Space Force Base and Federal agencies, including the Kennedy Space Center, the Emergency Op Center informs the public of an impending or actual emergency or disaster through the use of automatic telephone notification to everyone to start evacuating or other response. This center operates 24 hours a day.

The EOC has successfully conducted mass evacuation and relief of hundreds of thousands of residents from hurricanes since 1999 including two in 2004.

The EOC also warns of tornadoes and serious thunderstorms. Central Florida is the lightning capital of America with more deaths each year than the rest of the states combined. Lightning kills ten times more people in the area than sharks and alligators combined. The peak months are May–September peaking in July.
