= Palm Coast, Florida =

City in Florida, United States

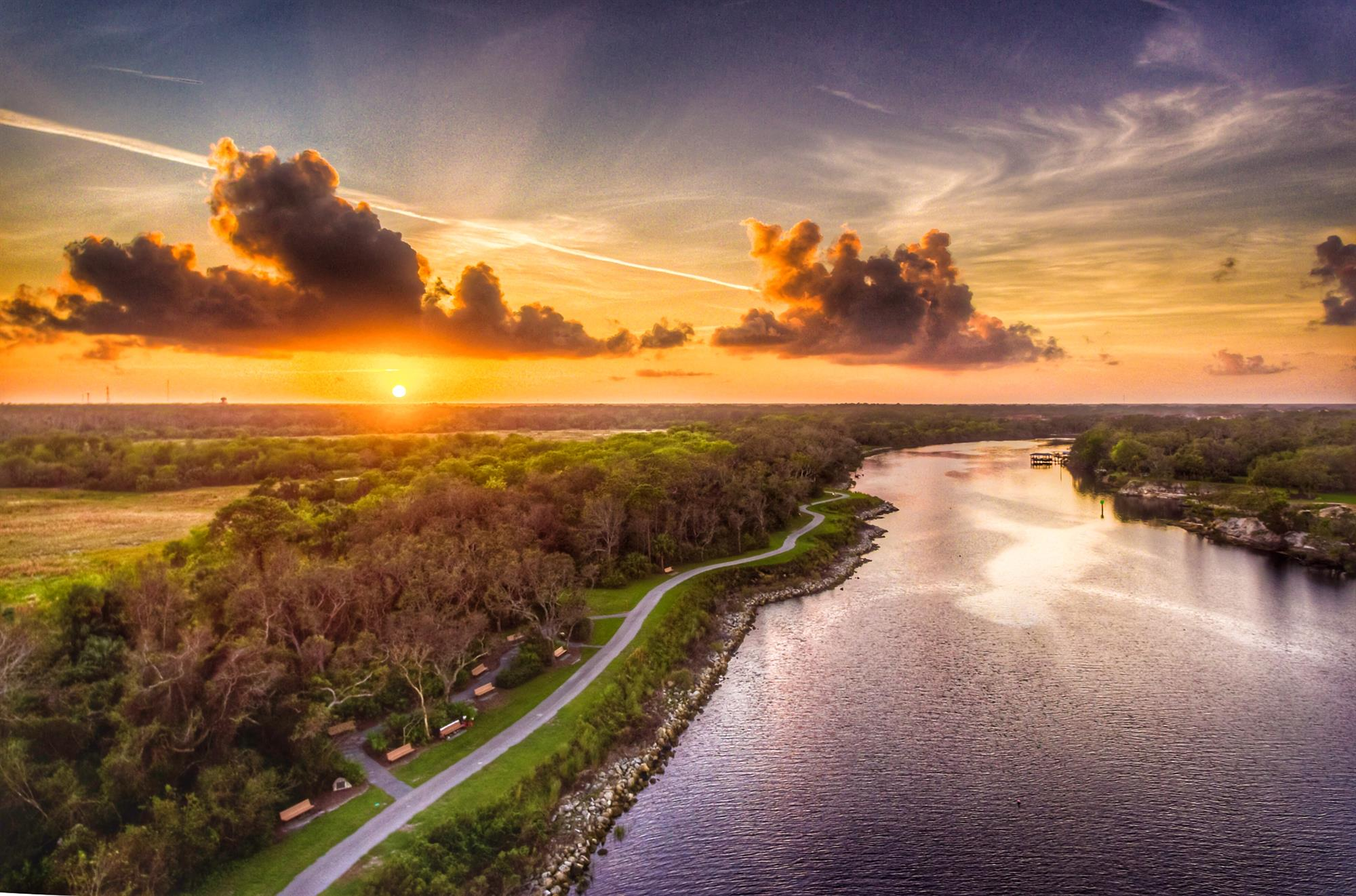

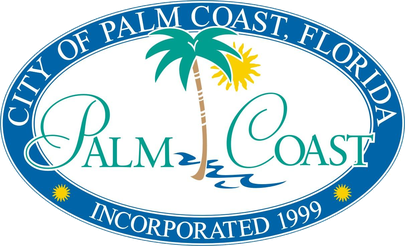
- Seal

- Location in Flagler County and the state of Florida
- Coordinates: 29°32′17″N 81°14′45″W
- Country: United States
- State: Florida
- County: Flagler
- Developed: 1969
- Incorporated (city): December 31, 1999

Government
  - Type: Council-Manager
  - Mayor: Mike Norris
  - Vice Mayor: Theresa Carli Pontieri
  - Council Members: Ty Miller, Theresa Carli Pontieri, David Sullivan, Charles A. Gambaro Jr.
  - City Manager: Mike McGlothlin
  - City Clerk: Kaley Cook

Area
  - City: 96.57 sq mi (250.12 km^{2})
  - Land: 95.37 sq mi (247.00 km^{2})
  - Water: 1.20 sq mi (3.12 km^{2})
- Elevation: 30 ft (9.1 m)

Population (2020)
  - City: 89,258
  - Estimate (2025): 109,886
  - Density: 935.9/sq mi (361.36/km^{2})
  - Urban: 349,064 (US: 109th)
  - Metro: 99,956
- Time zone: UTC-5 (Eastern (EST))
  - Summer (DST): UTC-4 (EDT)
- ZIP codes: 32135, 32137, 32142, 32164
- Area code: 386
- FIPS code: 12-54200
- GNIS feature ID: 2404465
- Website: palmcoast.gov

Palm Coast is a city in Flagler County, Florida, United States. As of the 2020 United States census, the population was 89,258, an increase of almost 200% since the 2000 count of 32,832. The population was estimated to be 98,411 as of July 1, 2022. The Daytona Beach News-Journal reported in May 2023 that the population of Palm Coast had surpassed Deltona, Florida as the most populous city in the Deltona–Daytona Beach–Ormond Beach, FL metropolitan statistical area.

== History ==
In the late 1950s, most of the land that would become Palm Coast consisted of swamp and pine forest, with only a few farms and beach houses as well as a turpentine distillery. Business activity was concentrated along Florida State Road 100. Tourists paid fees to hunt and fish in the area.

Developed by ITT Community Development Corporation in 1969, the original development plan encompassed 48,000 home sites on approximately 42,000 acres (17,000 ha) of the 68,000 acres (28,000 ha) owned by ITT. Paved streets and central water and sewer served all lots developed within the plan. An extensive water management system was designed to replenish the area's water table, which includes 46 miles (74 km) of freshwater canals and 23 miles (37 km) of saltwater canals. On October 29, 1970, ITT opened Palm Coast's welcome center. This date is now celebrated as Founder's Day.

In 1975, the Flagler County Board of County Commissioners established Palm Coast Service District, which included almost 40,000 acres (16,000 ha). Funds for the district were derived primarily from ad valorem taxes and were used to provide fire services, fire hydrants, street lighting, animal control and emergency services.

Florida had its first serious wildland–urban interface fire in 1985 with the Palm Coast Fire, which burned 131 homes. Research on this fire indicated that the most important factor was the proximity of heavy ground vegetation to the structures. Thirteen years later, fires struck the same Palm Coast subdivision. The 1998 fires were national news because the whole county was ordered to evacuate, and 45,000 people were displaced. Fire suppression organizations responded from 44 states, and Florida hosted the largest aerial suppression operation ever conducted in the United States. Because of the massive effort, only 71 homes were destroyed.

In September 1999, the citizenry of Palm Coast voted by a margin of two to one to incorporate as a council/manager form of government. On December 31, 1999, the City of Palm Coast was officially incorporated. On October 1, 2000, all services were officially transferred from the former Service District to the city of Palm Coast. The five-member City Council is elected at large and serves staggered four-year terms. One member is elected as mayor; the first was Jim Canfield. The promulgation and adoption of policy are the responsibility of the council and the execution of such policy is the responsibility of the council-appointed city manager. The city hired its first city manager, Dick Kelton, on April 17, 2000. In 2015, the City of Palm Coast completed and opened a new City Hall as part of its ongoing efforts to centralize municipal services and support long-term civic development.

== Geography ==
Palm Coast is located in northeastern Flagler County. According to the United States Census Bureau, the city has a total area of 90.8 square miles (235.3 km^{2}), of which 89.9 square miles (232.8 km^{2}) is land and 0.97 square miles (2.5 km^{2}), or 1.06%, is water. Interstate 95 effectively splits Palm Coast into two parts, with crossings at three interchanges: Exit 293 (Matanzas Woods Parkway), Exit 289 (Palm Coast Parkway), and Exit 284 (Florida State Road 100). U.S. Route 1 is on the western side of I-95 leading into Bunnell. The city extends north to the Flagler County line, southwest to the Bunnell city limits, and southeast to touch the city of Flagler Beach. The Intracoastal Waterway (ICW) is the eastern border of Palm Coast. The land east of the ICW is the Hammock, an unincorporated community on the Atlantic Ocean.

=== Bridges ===
The Hammock Dunes Bridge, completed in 1988, is a 65-foot-high, privately operated toll bridge in Palm Coast that connects the Hammock, a highly populated barrier island, to the mainland. Built to facilitate development of the area, it provides convenient access to the beach and is an essential evacuation and emergency access over the ICW. The only other ICW crossing in Flagler County is the Flagler Beach Bridge on Florida State Road 100.

=== Storms ===
The area around Palm Coast last saw a direct hit from a tropical cyclone in 2004 when Hurricane Charley passed directly over the area. Hurricane Floyd (1999), Hurricane Jeanne (2004), Tropical Storm Fay (2008), Hurricane Matthew (2016), Hurricane Irma (2017), and 2022 Hurricane Ian and Hurricane Nicole caused major damage in Flagler County. Statistically, the area experiences the effects of a tropical storm or hurricane every 2.73 years.

Palm Coast has become a bedroom community for St. Augustine, 25 miles (40 km) to the north, and Daytona Beach, 30 miles (48 km) to the south, while some residents also work in Orlando, 86 miles (138 km) and Jacksonville, 62 miles (100 km).

=== Climate ===
Palm Coast has a humid subtropical climate (Cfa), similar to other cities in North Florida.

Climate data for Palm Coast, Florida, 1991–2020 normals, extremes 1999–present
| Month | Jan | Feb | Mar | Apr | May | Jun | Jul | Aug | Sep | Oct | Nov | Dec | Year |
|---|---|---|---|---|---|---|---|---|---|---|---|---|---|
| Record high °F (°C) | 87 (31) | 89 (32) | 92 (33) | 94 (34) | 102 (39) | 100 (38) | 101 (38) | 99 (37) | 97 (36) | 92 (33) | 89 (32) | 87 (31) | 102 (39) |
| Mean maximum °F (°C) | 79.9 (26.6) | 82.3 (27.9) | 85.7 (29.8) | 88.7 (31.5) | 91.9 (33.3) | 95.1 (35.1) | 95.5 (35.3) | 95.6 (35.3) | 92.2 (33.4) | 88.7 (31.5) | 83.9 (28.8) | 81.0 (27.2) | 97.1 (36.2) |
| Mean daily maximum °F (°C) | 65.2 (18.4) | 67.9 (19.9) | 72.4 (22.4) | 77.8 (25.4) | 82.8 (28.2) | 86.2 (30.1) | 87.8 (31.0) | 87.8 (31.0) | 86.0 (30.0) | 80.8 (27.1) | 73.7 (23.2) | 68.5 (20.3) | 78.1 (25.6) |
| Daily mean °F (°C) | 57.2 (14.0) | 60.0 (15.6) | 64.2 (17.9) | 70.1 (21.2) | 76.2 (24.6) | 80.8 (27.1) | 82.2 (27.9) | 82.2 (27.9) | 80.8 (27.1) | 75.1 (23.9) | 67.1 (19.5) | 60.8 (16.0) | 71.4 (21.9) |
| Mean daily minimum °F (°C) | 49.2 (9.6) | 52.1 (11.2) | 56.0 (13.3) | 62.3 (16.8) | 69.5 (20.8) | 75.5 (24.2) | 76.5 (24.7) | 76.7 (24.8) | 75.6 (24.2) | 69.4 (20.8) | 60.4 (15.8) | 53.1 (11.7) | 64.7 (18.2) |
| Mean minimum °F (°C) | 30.7 (−0.7) | 35.7 (2.1) | 40.5 (4.7) | 49.1 (9.5) | 57.4 (14.1) | 66.1 (18.9) | 70.1 (21.2) | 70.6 (21.4) | 67.0 (19.4) | 52.9 (11.6) | 42.4 (5.8) | 37.8 (3.2) | 28.9 (−1.7) |
| Record low °F (°C) | 21 (−6) | 26 (−3) | 33 (1) | 39 (4) | 43 (6) | 54 (12) | 61 (16) | 64 (18) | 58 (14) | 41 (5) | 35 (2) | 23 (−5) | 21 (−6) |
| Average precipitation inches (mm) | 3.34 (85) | 3.60 (91) | 3.09 (78) | 2.51 (64) | 2.79 (71) | 5.92 (150) | 6.27 (159) | 6.41 (163) | 7.67 (195) | 4.45 (113) | 2.46 (62) | 2.93 (74) | 51.44 (1,307) |
| Average precipitation days (≥ 0.01 in) | 10.3 | 9.8 | 9.3 | 6.9 | 6.8 | 13.2 | 13.4 | 14.8 | 13.8 | 10.5 | 8.9 | 9.5 | 127.2 |
Source: NOAA (mean maxima/minima 2006–2020)

=== Parks ===
There are more than 130 miles of trails in the city, interconnected with parks and preserves:

- Belle Terre Park
- Bird of Paradise Nature Reserve
- Central Park in Town Center
- Community Center & Park
- Heroes Memorial Park
- Indian Trails Sports Complex

- James F. Holland Memorial Park
- Lehigh Trailhead
- Linear Park
- Long Creek Nature Preserve
- Palm Coast Aquatics Center

- Palm Harbor Golf Club
- Ralph Carter Park
- Seminole Woods Neighborhood Park
- Southern Recreation Center
- The Stage At Town Center
- Waterfront Park

== Economy ==
As of 2012, industrial parks within the town housed more than 30 mid-size businesses, with the largest one, the "Palm Coast Data" company, employing close to 1,000 people before closing August 15, 2020. Flagler County has had one of the highest rates of population growth in the United States since 1990, according to the U.S. Bureau of the Census. However, the area was hit extremely hard by the housing bust's recession. In December 2009, it had the worst unemployment rate of the state of Florida's largest metropolitan areas, according to the Bureau of Labor Statistics. The unemployment rate at that time was 16.9 percent. Palm Coast is the economic center of the county. In 2025, the top employers were Flagler County are schools, followed by full-service restaurants, medical & hospitals, landscaping services, limited-service restaurants, government offices, supermarkets & grocery stores, hotels & motels, retail superstores and department stores.

=== Village ===
The European Village is a mixed-use development in the Palm Harbor neighborhood near the Hammock Dunes Bridge that replicates the "live-work-play" environment of a traditional European-style town center. The architecture looks "old world" with an open-air plaza and a Center Stage playing live music on weekends and community events. There are almost 100 residential condos above 36,000 square feet (3,300 m^{2}) of commercial space. Since opening February 21, 2006 it now has over a dozen restaurants and bars plus boutiques, salons and a Sunday farmers market.

== Local government ==
Palm Coast is under a council-manager form of government, meaning its ordinances are considered by a City Council with the Mayor as the chair. A Vice Mayor is appointed by the council on an annual basis. The Palm Coast City Council has five seats, four of which are for Council members elected to represent geographic districts, and one at-large seat for the Mayor. Registered voters from anywhere in the city can vote for each of the five Council seats. As of July 2025, the Palm Coast City Council is occupied by the following Council members:

| Position | Name |
|---|---|
| Mayor of Palm Coast | Mike Norris |
| City Council Member, District 1 | Ty Miller |
| City Council Member, District 2 | Theresa Carli Pontieri (Vice Mayor) |
| City Council Member, District 3 | David Sullivan |
| City Council Member, District 4 | Charles A. Gambaro Jr. |

Pontieri is the longest serving on the council, having been elected in 2022. Norris and Miller were elected in 2024. Former Councilwoman Cathy Heighter resigned her seat in August 2024, leading to the appointment of Gambaro to serve out the remaining two years of her term. Former Councilman Ray Stevens vacated his seat on February 28, 2025, leading to the appointment of David Sullivan by the remaining four Council members on April 15.

The Palm Coast City Council has a two-term limit instituted by the City Charter, with the exception of those members serving a partial term from a special election. Those members may serve two four-year terms along with the duration of the partial term, as decided by the voters. Palm Coast City Council races are nonpartisan, though members' political affiliation is often available to residents in public registration data.

=== Services ===
- The Palm Coast Fire Department provides fire protection.
- The city contracts with the Flagler County Sheriff’s Office for law enforcement.
- The city's Community Development department manages planning, zoning, building permits, and code enforcement rather than the county.
- The city contracts with FCC Environmental for refuse collection, recycling and yard waste.
- Water and Sewer lines were constructed and operated by ITT dba Florida Water Services until sold to Allete in 1996, then the City of Palm Coast in 2003. The Palm Coast Utility Department now has responsibility for water and sewer operation and maintenance.
- The Utilities Stormwater division is responsible for design and construction of canals, swales, culverts, ditches and retention ponds to control flooding, minimize erosion, and protect the quality of water.
- The Palm Coast City Council adopted the 2023 Parks & Recreation Master Plan, a joint venture between the city and county to define goals and responsibilities for recreational facilities, parks, services and programs in the city/county.
- The Palm Coast Public Works department is responsible for maintenance of non-state and non-county roads within the city limits.
- The Palm Coast Economic Development department promotes the area as business-friendly to attract new investment and retain existing business using an Economic Development website.
- The Palm Coast Animal Control division enforces state laws and local ordinances for public health, the safety of pets and responsible ownership of pets.

At the county level, schools are administered by the Flagler School Board; the East Flagler Mosquito Control District monitors and suppresses mosquito populations; the Elections Supervisor handles voter registration and elections; the Property Appraiser and Tax Collector deal with property and taxes; and the Clerk of Courts is the custodian of records and manages the administrative operations of the court system. The Flagler Board of County Commissioners oversees the administration of typical county services, such as roads, public safety, and land use planning, but the city of Palm Coast takes responsibility for most services within the city except the library.

== Demographics ==
Historical population
| Census | Pop. | Note | %± |
|---|---|---|---|
| 1980 | 2,837 | | — |
| 1990 | 14,287 | | 403.6% |
| 2000 | 32,732 | | 129.1% |
| 2010 | 75,180 | | 129.7% |
| 2020 | 89,258 | | 18.7% |
| 2025 (est.) | 109,886 | | 23.1% |
U.S. Decennial Census

=== Racial and ethnic composition ===
Palm Coast, Florida – Racial and ethnic composition Note: the US Census treats Hispanic/Latino as an ethnic category. This table excludes Latinos from the racial categories and assigns them to a separate category. Hispanics/Latinos may be of any race.
| Race / Ethnicity (NH = Non-Hispanic) | Pop 2000 | Pop 2010 | Pop 2020 | % 2000 | % 2010 | % 2020 |
|---|---|---|---|---|---|---|
| White (NH) | 26,217 | 54,762 | 62,158 | 80.10% | 72.84% | 69.64% |
| Black or African American (NH) | 3,261 | 9,191 | 9,249 | 9.96% | 12.23% | 10.36% |
| Native American or Alaska Native (NH) | 65 | 155 | 223 | 0.20% | 0.21% | 0.25% |
| Asian (NH) | 492 | 1,878 | 2,161 | 1.50% | 2.50% | 2.42% |
| Pacific Islander or Native Hawaiian (NH) | 10 | 44 | 55 | 0.03% | 0.06% | 0.06% |
| Some other race (NH) | 73 | 270 | 614 | 0.22% | 0.36% | 0.69% |
| Mixed race or Multiracial (NH) | 418 | 1,328 | 3,852 | 1.28% | 1.77% | 4.32% |
| Hispanic or Latino (any race) | 2,196 | 7,552 | 10,946 | 6.71% | 10.05% | 12.26% |
| Total | 32,732 | 75,180 | 89,258 | 100.00% | 100.00% | 100.00% |

=== 2020 census ===
As of the 2020 census, Palm Coast had a population of 89,258. The median age was 51.6 years. 17.7% of residents were under the age of 18 and 30.6% of residents were 65 years of age or older. For every 100 females there were 91.2 males, and for every 100 females age 18 and over there were 88.3 males age 18 and over.

98.8% of residents lived in urban areas, while 1.2% lived in rural areas.

There were 36,279 households in Palm Coast, of which 24.0% had children under the age of 18 living in them. Of all households, 55.2% were married-couple households, 13.3% were households with a male householder and no spouse or partner present, and 24.9% were households with a female householder and no spouse or partner present. About 22.6% of all households were made up of individuals and 14.1% had someone living alone who was 65 years of age or older. There were 24,478 families in the city.

There were 39,763 housing units, of which 8.8% were vacant. The homeowner vacancy rate was 1.8% and the rental vacancy rate was 7.9%.

Racial composition as of the 2020 census
| Race | Number | Percent |
|---|---|---|
| White | 65,108 | 72.9% |
| Black or African American | 9,622 | 10.8% |
| American Indian and Alaska Native | 301 | 0.3% |
| Asian | 2,215 | 2.5% |
| Native Hawaiian and Other Pacific Islander | 59 | 0.1% |
| Some other race | 3,141 | 3.5% |
| Two or more races | 8,812 | 9.9% |
| Hispanic or Latino (of any race) | 10,946 | 12.3% |

=== 2010 census ===
As of the 2010 United States census, there were 75,180 people, 27,184 households, and 19,862 families residing in the city.

=== 2000 census ===
As of 2000, 22.4% had children under the age of 18 living with them, 66.6% were married couples living together, 8.1% had a female householder with no husband present, and 22.7% were non-families. 18.6% of all households were made up of individuals, and 11.9% had someone living alone who was 65 years of age or older. The average household size was 2.38 and the average family size was 2.68.

In 2000, the city's population was spread out, with 18.5% under the age of 18, 4.6% from 18 to 24, 19.7% from 25 to 44, 26.9% from 45 to 64, and 30.2% who were 65 years of age or older. The median age was 51 years. For every 100 females, there were 90.4 males. For every 100 females age 18 and over, there were 87.6 males.

In 2000, the median income for a household in the city was $41,570, and the median income for a family was $45,818. Males had a median income of $31,976 versus $24,637 for females. The per capita income for the city was $21,490. About 5.6% of families and 7.5% of the population were below the poverty line, including 14.3% of those under age 18 and 3.6% of those age 65 or over.

=== Languages ===
As of 2000, English spoken as a first language accounted for 87.66% of all residents, while 12.33% spoke other languages as their mother tongue. The most significant was Spanish speakers who made up 6.48% of the population, while German came up as the third most spoken language, which made up 1.18%, Italian was spoken by 1.02%, and Portuguese at 1.00% of the population.

== Noted issues ==
=== Pedestrian fatalities ===
On March 2, 2017, Michelle Taylor, a 16-year-old student of Matanzas High School was struck and killed by a car while walking home from school in an area with no sidewalks and few street lights. In the following months, the people of the city petitioned to have more street lights and sidewalks installed throughout the entire city to reduce the number of pedestrian injuries and deaths. Students of Matanzas High School took charge of these efforts by creating committees and petitions to generate attention and pressure the local city council. Towards the end of 2016, Kevin Smith Jr, also a student of Matanzas, was injured in a hit and run under the same conditions.

== Healthcare ==
There are two hospitals in the city: AdventHealth Palm Coast and AdventHealth Palm Coast Parkway.

== Notable people ==
- Ray Black Jr., driver in the NASCAR Xfinity Series
- Blackbear, singer of Hot Girl Bummer
- Darryl Boyer, politician and activist
- Caesar DePaço, Portuguese businessman and diplomat who served as the Portuguese Consul to Florida
- Louis Bernard Gaskin, "The Ninja Killer" who was executed by the state in 2023
- Eddie Money, singer of Two Tickets to Paradise
- Reilly Opelka, tennis player
- Leslie West, former lead singer of Mountain
- Home Is Where, emo band
- Rain City Drive, post-hardcore band
