= Luís Filipe Tavares =

Cape Verdean politician

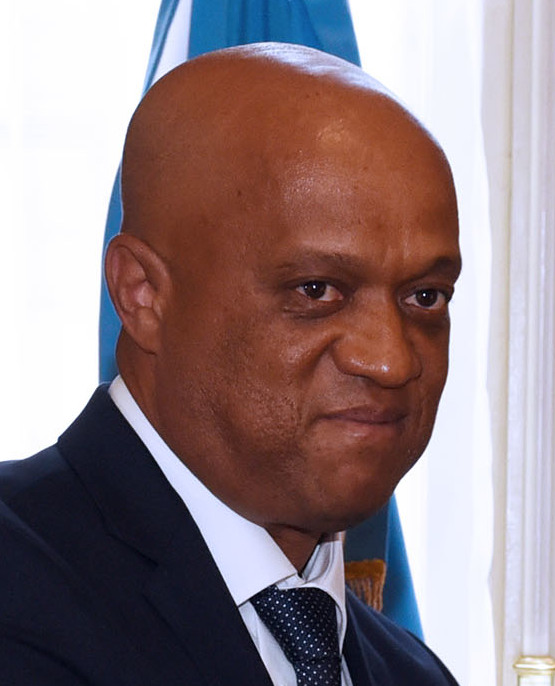

Personal details
- Born: 25 August 1965 (age 60)

Luís Filipe Lopes Tavares (born 25 August 1965) is Cape Verdean politician who served as Minister of Foreign Affairs and Communities & Minister of Defence of Cape Verde. He resigned from this position in April 2021 following allegations of corruption. He was decorated with "Chevalier de l'Ordre National du Mérite" by the French President Nicolas Sarkozy.

== Life and education ==
Tavares was born in the city of Praia. He obtained a bachelor's degree in Geography from the University of Rouen, France and a diploma in Specialist in Local Development from the International Training Centre of the ILO, Turin, Italy before earning a master's degree in Local Policies majoring in organization and development from the University of Rouen.

== Career ==
He was a Councilor of the Municipality of Praia. He was appointed advisor to the Prime Minister of Cape Verde and later General Director of the Decentralization Office/General Directorate of Local Administration of the Government. He lectured at the Instituto Superior de Educação, the Instituto Nacional de Administração e Gestão and at the Universidade Jean Piaget de Cabo Verde where he was a General Administrator. He served as the Minister of Foreign Affairs and Communities before being deployed to the Ministry of Defence where he resigned over an allegation of corruption.
