= Matanzas High School =

Location
- 3535 Old Kings Road North; Palm Coast, Flagler County, Florida 32137; United States
- 29.6013°N 81.2346°W

Information
- Type: Public
- Motto: Make Good Choices, Hold Yourself Accountable, Strive for Excellence
- Established: 2005
- School district: Flagler County Public Schools
- NCES School ID: 120054005533
- Principal: Mike Rinaldi
- Faculty: 86.00 (on an FTE basis)
- Grades: 9 to 12
- Enrollment: 1,978 (2022-23)
- Student to teacher ratio: 23.00
- Colors: Royal Blue, Silver and Black
- Mascot: Pirates
- Nickname: MHS
- Website: mhspirates.com

Matanzas High School (MHS) is located at 3535 Old King's Road North in Palm Coast, Florida. The school's sports teams are known as the Pirates. As of 2013–2014, it was A-rated. The school colors are royal blue, silver and black.

The school has held a multicultural festival.

== 2023 attack ==
On February 21, 2023, Brendan Depa, a then 17-year-old student was arrested after attacking his teacher and beating her into an unconscious state, allegedly because his Nintendo Switch was taken from him during class. He was charged as an adult and on August 6, 2024, he was sentenced to 5 years in prison and 15 years of probation.
