= National Register of Historic Places listings in Flagler County, Florida =

Location of Flagler County in Florida

This is a list of the National Register of Historic Places listings in Flagler County, Florida.

This is intended to be a complete list of the properties and districts on the National Register of Historic Places in Flagler County, Florida, United States. The locations of National Register properties and districts for which the latitude and longitude coordinates are included below, may be seen in a map.

There are 13 properties and districts listed on the National Register in the county.

This National Park Service list is complete through NPS recent listings posted May 1, 2026.

Contents: Counties in Florida (non-linked contain no National Register listings)
Alachua - Baker - Bay - Bradford - Brevard - Broward - Calhoun - Charlotte - Citrus - Clay - Collier - Columbia - DeSoto - Dixie - Duval - Escambia - Flagler - Franklin - Gadsden - Gilchrist - Glades - Gulf - Hamilton - Hardee - Hendry - Hernando - Highlands - Hillsborough (Tampa) - Holmes - Indian River - Jackson - Jefferson - Lafayette - Lake - Lee - Leon - Levy - Liberty - Madison - Manatee - Marion - Martin - Miami-Dade (Miami) - Monroe - Nassau - Okaloosa - Okeechobee - Orange - Osceola - Palm Beach - Pasco - Pinellas - Polk - Putnam - St. Johns - St. Lucie - Santa Rosa - Sarasota - Seminole - Sumter - Suwannee - Taylor - Union - Volusia - Wakulla - Walton - Washington

== Current listings ==
	Name on the Register	Image	Date listed	Location	City or town	Description
1	Bulow Plantation Ruins	Bulow Plantation Ruins	September 29, 1970 (#70000185)	3501 Old Kings Road; 29°26′10″N 81°08′28″W	Flagler Beach	Bulow Plantation Ruins Historic State Park
2	Bunnell City Hall	Bunnell City Hall	February 4, 2019 (#100003406)	200 South Church Street; 29°27′57″N 81°15′22″W	Bunnell	Part of the Florida's New Deal Resources MPS - Bunnell Coquina City Hall
3	Bunnell Water Tower	Bunnell Water Tower	February 4, 2019 (#100003407)	100 Utility Street; 29°28′03″N 81°15′37″W	Bunnell	Bunnell Water Tower
4	Cherokee Grove	Cherokee Grove	May 2, 1997 (#97000379)	West of State Road A1A and east of Interstate 95, on Pellicer Creek, approximately ¼ mile south of the St. Johns-Flagler county line 29°39′30″N 81°14′15″W	Palm Coast	Princess Place Preserve
5	Dixie Highway-Hastings, Espanola and Bunnell Road	Dixie Highway-Hastings, Espanola and Bunnell Road	April 20, 2005 (#05000311)	Roughly Espanola in Flagler County to County Route 204 in St. Johns County; 29°34′49″N 81°20′35″W	Espanola	Extends into St. Johns County
6	Espanola Schoolhouse	Espanola Schoolhouse	July 22, 2020 (#100005382)	298 Knox Jones Avenue; 29°30′23″N 81°18′33″W	Bunnell	Espanola Schoolhouse (Florida's Historic Black Public Schools MPS)
7	Holden House	Holden House	October 16, 2018 (#SG100003020)	204 E. Moody Blvd. 29°28′00″N 81°15′25″W	Bunnell	Holden House Museum and home of the Flagler County Historical Society
8	Mala Compra Plantation Archeological Site	Mala Compra Plantation Archeological Site	March 5, 2004 (#04000142)	Approximately 1000 feet west of the intersection of North Oceanshore Boulevard and Mala Compra Drive; 29°36′54″N 81°12′14″W	Palm Coast	Mala Compra Plantation Archeological Site
9	Marine Studios	Marine Studios	April 14, 1986 (#86000831)	State Road A1A, Box 122; 29°40′06″N 81°12′46″W	Marineland	Marineland Dolphin Adventure
10	Old Bunnell State Bank Building	Old Bunnell State Bank Building	June 25, 1992 (#92000824)	101-107 North Bay Street; 29°27′53″N 81°15′32″W	Bunnell	Old Bunnell State Bank Building
11	St. Mary Catholic Church	St. Mary Catholic Church	January 25, 2024 (#100009785)	89 St. Mary’s Place; 29°24′19″N 81°11′38″W	Bunnell	Also known as the St. Mary Mother Catholic Church. The Shrine of Saint Christopher was also included as a contributing resource.
12	Vocational Agriculture Building	Vocational Agriculture Building	February 21, 2007 (#07000058)	1001 East Howe Street; 29°28′19″N 81°15′17″W	Bunnell	Part of the Florida's New Deal Resources MPS - (also known as the Little Red School House)
13	Washington Oaks Historic District	Washington Oaks Historic District	September 30, 2009 (#09000400)	6402 Oceanshore Boulevard; 29°38′06″N 81°12′14″W	Palm Coast	Washington Oaks Gardens State Park

== See also ==
- List of National Historic Landmarks in Florida
- National Register of Historic Places listings in Florida
