= Espanola Schoolhouse =

- U.S. National Register of Historic Places
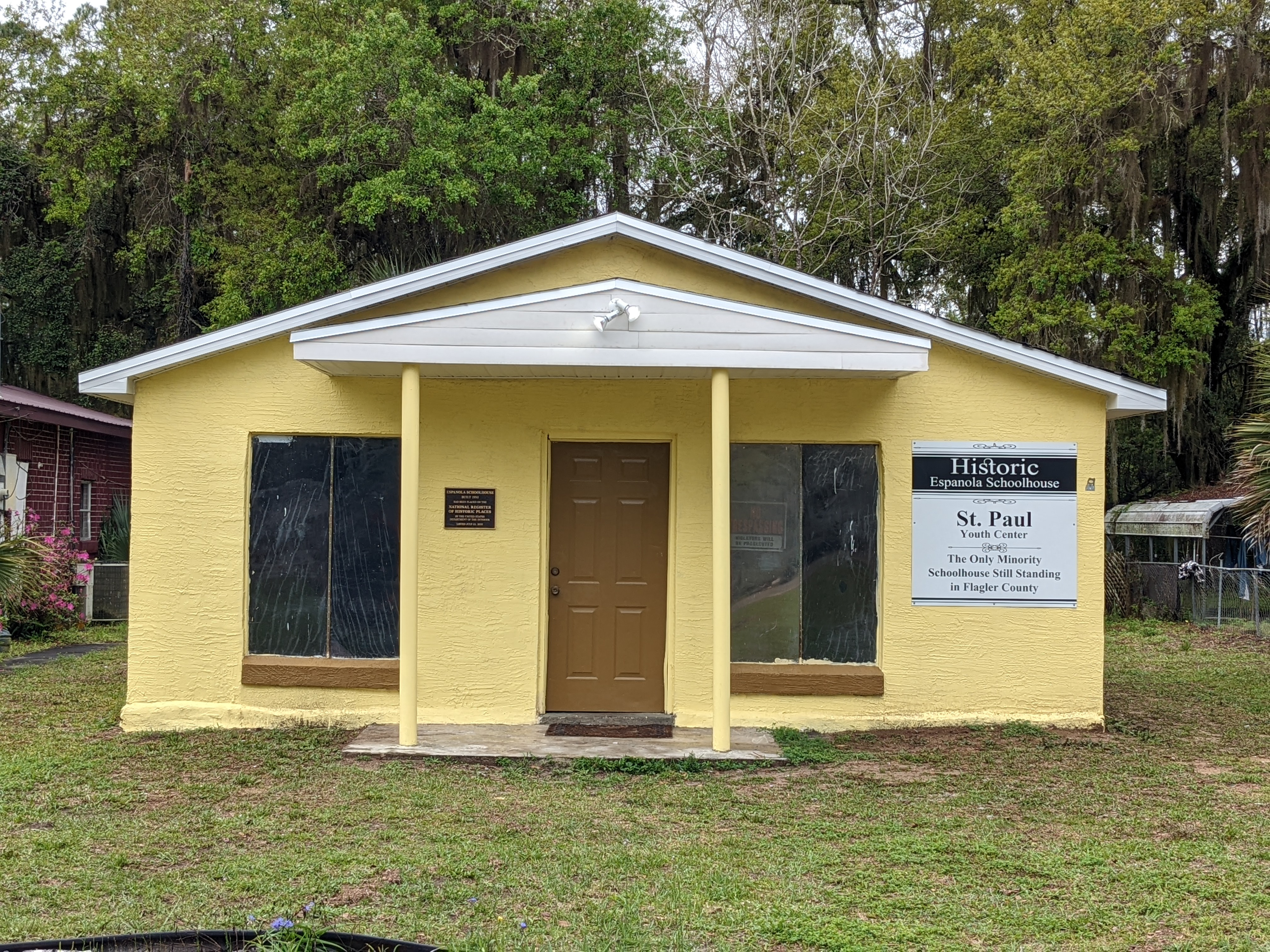
- Espanola Schoolhouse - full front view (photographed March 2022)

- Location within Florida Location within the United States
- Location: 298 Knox Jones Avenue, Bunnell, Florida
- Coordinates: 29°30′19.296″N 81°18′33.192″W
- Area: 966 square feet (90 m^{2})
- Built: 1950
- Architectural style: Vernacular
- NRHP reference No.: 100005382
- Added to NRHP: July 22, 2020

The Espanola Schoolhouse is a one-story; one-room rural school building that has survived from the Jim Crow racial segregation-era. It is the last standing one-room schoolhouse in Flagler County. It is located at 98 Knox Jones Avenue, Bunnell, Florida 32110.

In 1949, several members of the African-American community of Espanola, led by schoolteacher Essie Mae Mack Giddens (1927-2003), traveled to Pomona Park, Florida to gather information for building plans for a one-room schoolhouse. The plans for a new one-room schoolhouse, to be built in Espanola, were compiled and submitted to the Flagler County School Board, which promptly approved them.

After the Flagler County School Board approved the one-room schoolhouse building plans, the community raised money selling ice cream and peanuts and pooled their donation money together to purchase a lot of land and build a school in their own community, which became known as the Espanola Schoolhouse. The Pallbearer's Society (a mutual aid network) with assistance of the Espanola community, then constructed the building and completed it in 1950. The Flagler County School District supplied furniture, school books (many previously used by Flagler County's “White” segregated public schools) and installed electricity in the schoolhouse building. The Espanola Schoolhouse made it possible for the area's non-high school age black children to attend school in their own neighborhood. Espanola community volunteers did most of the maintenance and service for the Espanola Schoolhouse during its years of operation as a school, as the deed to the building was never transferred to the Flagler County School District.

== Schoolhouse operations ==
Although the Espanola Schoolhouse was part of the Flagler County School District, it did not have running water or an indoor bathroom. It did have a wood-burning stove that provided heat on cold days, a hand-operated water pump in the backyard to provide water and a single outhouse in the backyard, which provided the only bathroom facilities.

The Espanola Schoolhouse accommodated thirty or more African-American students per school year. Education at the school spanned first grade through the eighth grade. In addition to African-American children from Espanola, the nearby communities of Neoga and Bimini sent their African-American children to the Espanola Schoolhouse to be educated. Some of these children walked more than six miles per day to attend this school.

There was only one full-time schoolteacher, Essie Mae Giddens, during the time, 1950 to 1957, which the Espanola Schoolhouse operated as a Flagler County elementary school. Mrs. Giddens arranged all eight grades of students into separate groups in the one-room building and taught different lessons to each group throughout the day. The community provided several volunteers, and teacher's aides, that assisted with the building operations and teaching lessons at the school. After the 1957 school year, the Flagler County School Board moved the first grade through the eighth grade students in the Espanola area to its black segregated elementary school in Bunnell.

From 1958 to 1970, the Espanola Schoolhouse operated as an independent kindergarten for the Espanola area. Teacher, Ida Mae Wiley, taught approximately thirty children during each school year during this time. The Espanola Schoolhouse building was closed as a school after the 1970 school year.

From 1971 to 2001, the Espanola Schoolhouse was used as a storage facility and gradually fell into disrepair. Starting in 2001, a community renovation project, led by Rev. Frank Giddens and Queenie Jackson, performed considerable exterior and interior repairs, installed air conditioning and added a bathroom inside the building, which enabled it to be open to the public as a clubhouse (youth center).

The Espanola Schoolhouse retains its historic appearance and character and now serves the community as the St. Paul Youth Center, which is used for academic tutoring, a social center and summer camp for the area's disadvantaged youth.

== Architectural attributes ==
The Espanola Schoolhouse has a rectangular plan and measures 23 feet wide by 42 feet deep (966 square feet).

=== Exterior ===
The exterior walls are constructed with concrete block and are finished with stucco. The roof is a wood framed gable design with asphalt shingles. The soffit is fitted with white aluminum ventilation panels and the fascia is fitted with white aluminum trim around the entire roof. A wood framed small gable roof with asphalt shingles covers the front porch, and is supported by two wood pillars. The entire exterior of the building is painted yellow, and the trim of the small gable roof over the front porch and its two wood pillars are painted green. The front porch is a concrete slab that measures 10 feet wide by 5 feet deep. The front (east) of the building includes two large fixed double pane windows and a single wood paneled door that provides the main entrance into the building. The north side of the building includes two large fixed double pane windows, and two smaller double hung windows. The back (west) of the building includes one small double hung window. The south side of the building includes two large fixed double pane windows, two smaller double hung windows and a single wood paneled door that provides an entrance into the rear of the building.

The historic building had needed repairs performed in March 2022 that included pressure washing, stucco repairs, exterior painting, new aluminum drip edge, soffit and fascia and structural repairs to the front porch. A new custom sign was installed that reads, “Historic Espanola Schoolhouse, St. Paul Youth Center, The Only Minority Schoolhouse Still Standing in Flagler County."

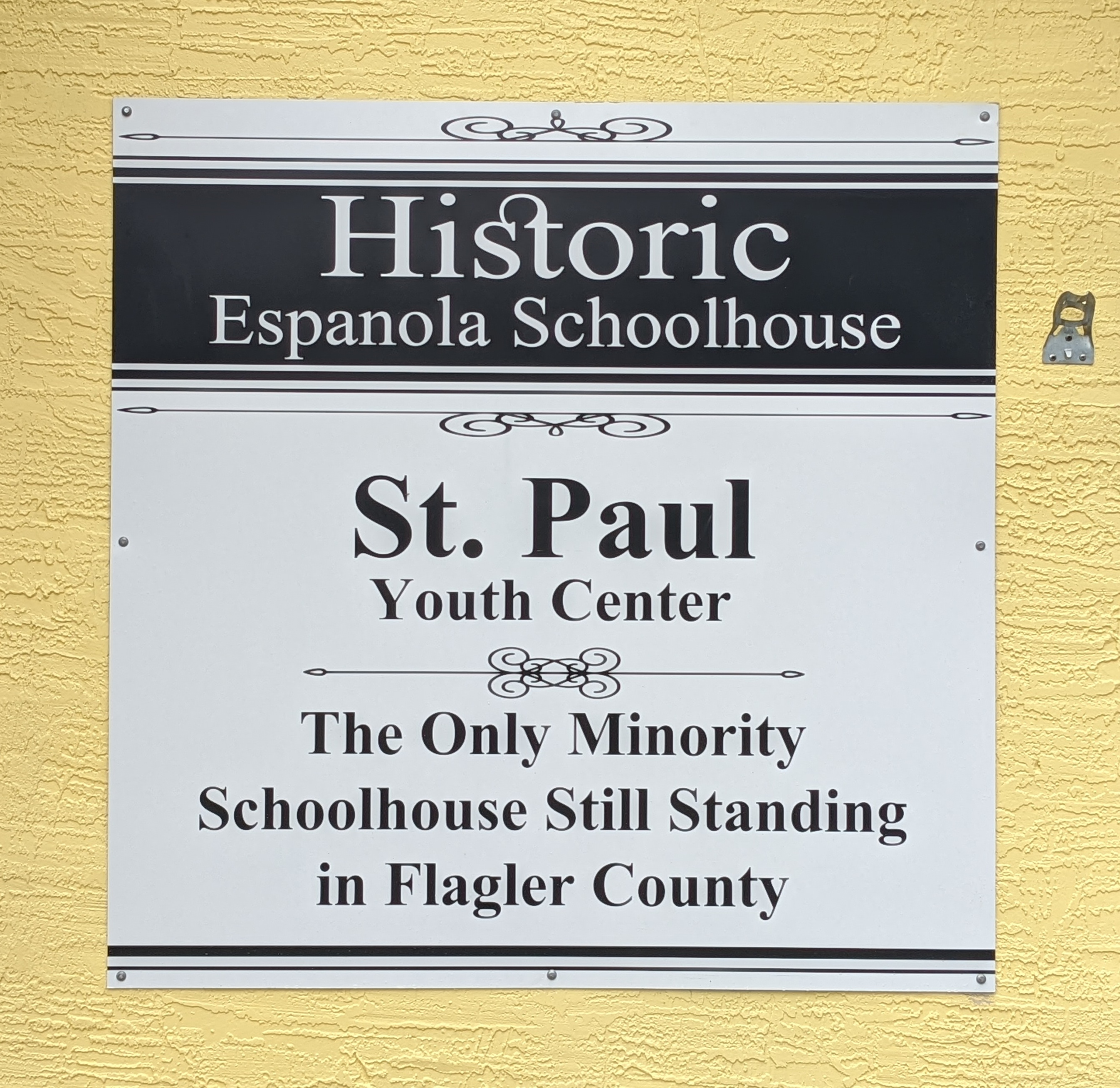
Espanola Schoolhouse - New Metal Sign - Installed March 2022.

=== Interior ===
The interior of the building has had one room addition in the southwest section, which is the bathroom that includes a wood stud framed wall finished with drywall, a single wood paneled door and a privacy wood stud framed wall finished with drywall which were installed in 2004. All other walls in the interior are original to the building and are finished with stucco and painted in a dual white and yellow pattern. The ceilings are finished with drywall, painted white and include several ceiling fans, lights and an entrance panel to a crawl space beneath the roof. The floor is a concrete slab that has been covered with 12” x 12” ceramic tiles. The building includes a wood stud framed wall finished with plaster and a large central opening (with no door) that separates the front of the entrance-way section of the building and the schoolroom area. The schoolroom area is mostly in original condition (with the exception of the additions of the bathroom and privacy wall extension) and is furnished with chairs, tables, books and a large television, which is used to view educational and instructional videos.

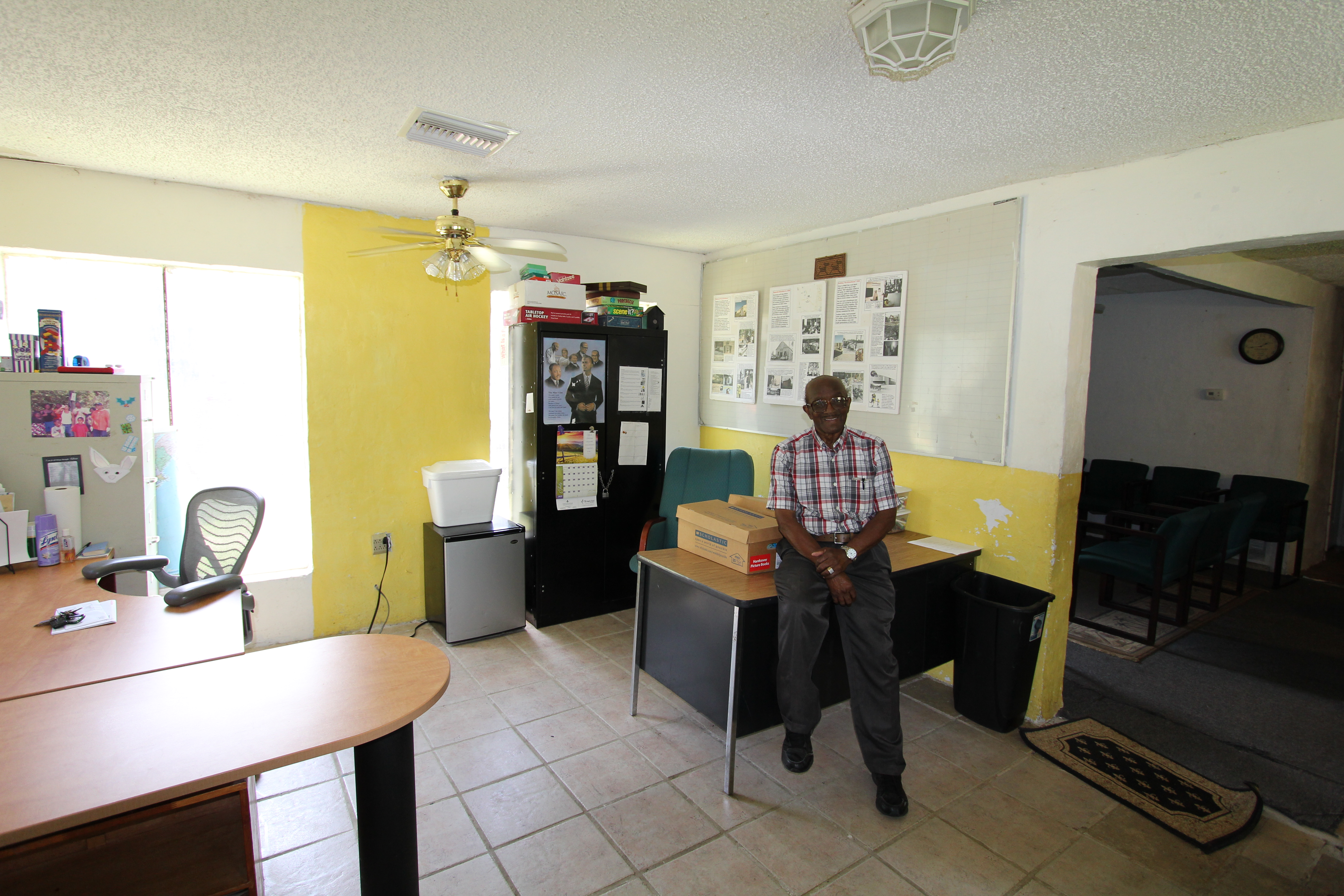
Interior View of the Espanola Schoolhouse (Photo taken July 29, 2019).

== History of Espanola, Florida ==
Prior to the 1880s, the area now known as Espanola was located within St. Johns County and was known as Raulerson (which was named after a locally settled family). There were only a few scattered residents, no local railroad access, no waterway transportation and the only practical ground road transportation were wagon trails. Around 1884, the narrow-gauge St. Johns & Halifax Railway was built right through the area, and by 1886, it connected East Palatka to Daytona. In 1893, the town of Espanola was established (a circa 1893 railroad map shows both the Raulerson P.O. and Espanola). After 1893, Raulerson does not appear on any maps as Espanola was now the official name of the town. Espanola became a well-established railroad stop and shipping point as Henry Flagler’s newly formed modernized standard-gauge Florida East Coast Railway ran right through the town. The railroad created new jobs and increased the demand for the construction of new buildings and infrastructure. This resulted in Espanola’s population to expand beyond 100 by the late 1890s. During this same time, African-Americans began relocating to the Espanola area where they found employment opportunities mainly in the turpentine, lumber and railroad industries.

In the early 1900s, large tracts of land in the Espanola area were purchased and leased to set up turpentine still operations. A large saw mill was built in Espanola that was connected with narrow-gauge railroads that branched into the nearby woods where virgin timber was harvested. These timbers were sawed into lumber, loaded onto Florida East Coast Railway cars, and shipped to distant markets. Now that the railroad was completed through the area and large quantities of timber was clear-cut, the mills began to close and the local economy shrank.

In 1915, the Dixie Highway was built from the Midwest to the Southern United States, and a portion of it ran right through Espanola. This highway opened a new tourist trade as well as attracted new residents and businesses, which boosted the economy in the Espanola area. Over-night tourists (known as ‘Tin Can Tourists’) prompted the establishment of a new hotel and camps to accommodate these automobile-campers. When Flagler County was founded in 1917, from sections of St. Johns and Volusia counties, Espanola became part of Flagler County. Since Espanola was one of the only areas in Flagler County that African-Americans could purchase property many families settled here, built homes and contributed to the community's development.

In 1920, the population of Espanola had grown to 385, and there were many new businesses in town in addition to the hotel and camps including an automobile garage, the offices of the Neoga Naval Stores Company, a general store, post office with mail route, cafe, rooming house, barbershop, dry goods store, stave mill, grocery store and school. The Florida Land Boom of the 1920s brought many additional travelers through the area, but by 1926, it went bust and fizzled out. Farming picked up as a lucrative business and provided a boost to the local economy as many African-Americans found employment on local farms. Large quantities of potatoes, corn and narcissus bulbs were grown in nearby areas such as Bimini. This produce was loaded onto Florida East Coast Railway cars at the Espanola stop and shipped to various regional marketplaces.

In 1926, a new highway (now U.S. 1) was built from St. Augustine directly to Bunnell and bypassed Espanola. This rendered the Dixie Highway route through Espanola obsolete as automobile traffic drastically declined and very few tourists and travelers ventured to Espanola. The economy of Espanola was devastated and over the following two decades many people relocated and all the businesses closed with the exception of a local grocery store. The U.S. Post Office in Espanola closed on February 28, 1955, as there was no longer enough mail business or residents in the area to justify an official government office.

Today, the railroad that passed through Espanola is gone and the many commercial buildings that were constructed during Espanola's heyday have all been razed. The area has evolved into a quiet rural community with no noticeable remnants of its once busy and prosperous past. The community now includes residential homes, a church, the one-room Espanola Schoolhouse, a Flagler County Fire Station, cemetery and community center. African-Americans make up a large portion of Espanola's population, and some families have lived in the area for more than four generations.

== Listing on the National Register of Historic Places ==
The initial nomination was approved by the Florida National Register Review Board on February 6, 2020, and was then sent to the U.S. Department of the Interior, National Park Service for final approval by the Keeper of the National Register. On July 22, 2020, the Espanola Schoolhouse was officially listed on the National Register of Historic Places. The Espanola Schoolhouse is Flagler County's first landmark directly associated with black history to receive national recognition. The historical significance of the property is associated with the areas of Education and Black Ethnic Heritage. The Espanola Schoolhouse was listed on the NRHP under a multiple property submission: (Florida's Historic Black Public Schools MPS).

== Bronze National Register of Historic Places Plaque Installed ==
As a community project, the National Association of Watch and Clock Collectors - Chapter 154 - Daytona Beach, FL ordered and purchased a National Register of Historic Places solid bronze plaque from Franklin Bronze Plaques of Franklin, PA. On September 28, 2020, it was installed on the front of the Espanola Schoolhouse while several people from the community looked on. This plaque now serves as a proud reminder of the historical importance, and helps preserve the legacy, of the Espanola Schoolhouse.

Installation of the NRHP bronze plaque
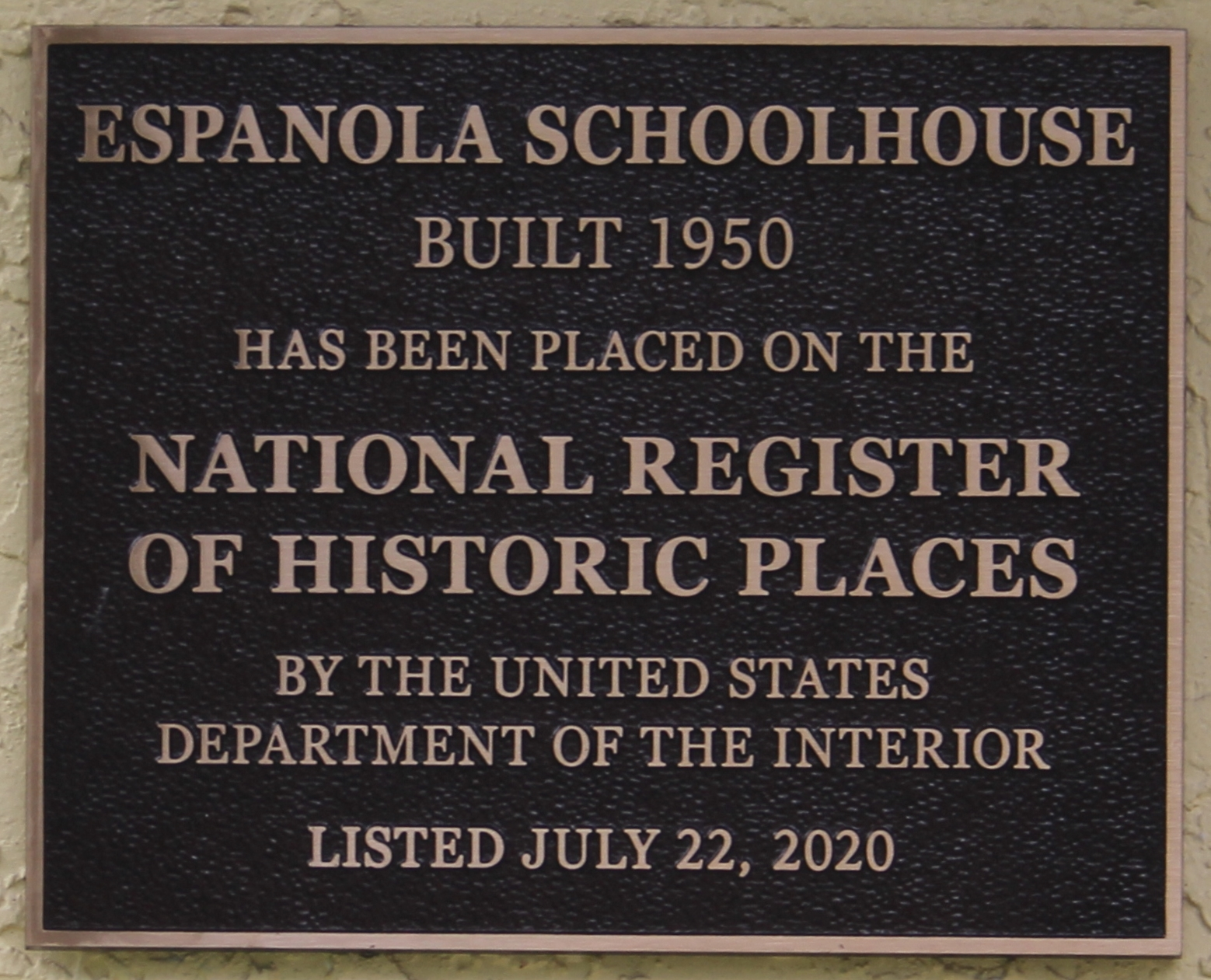
Espanola Schoolhouse - Bronze NRHP Plaque - Photo taken September 28, 2020

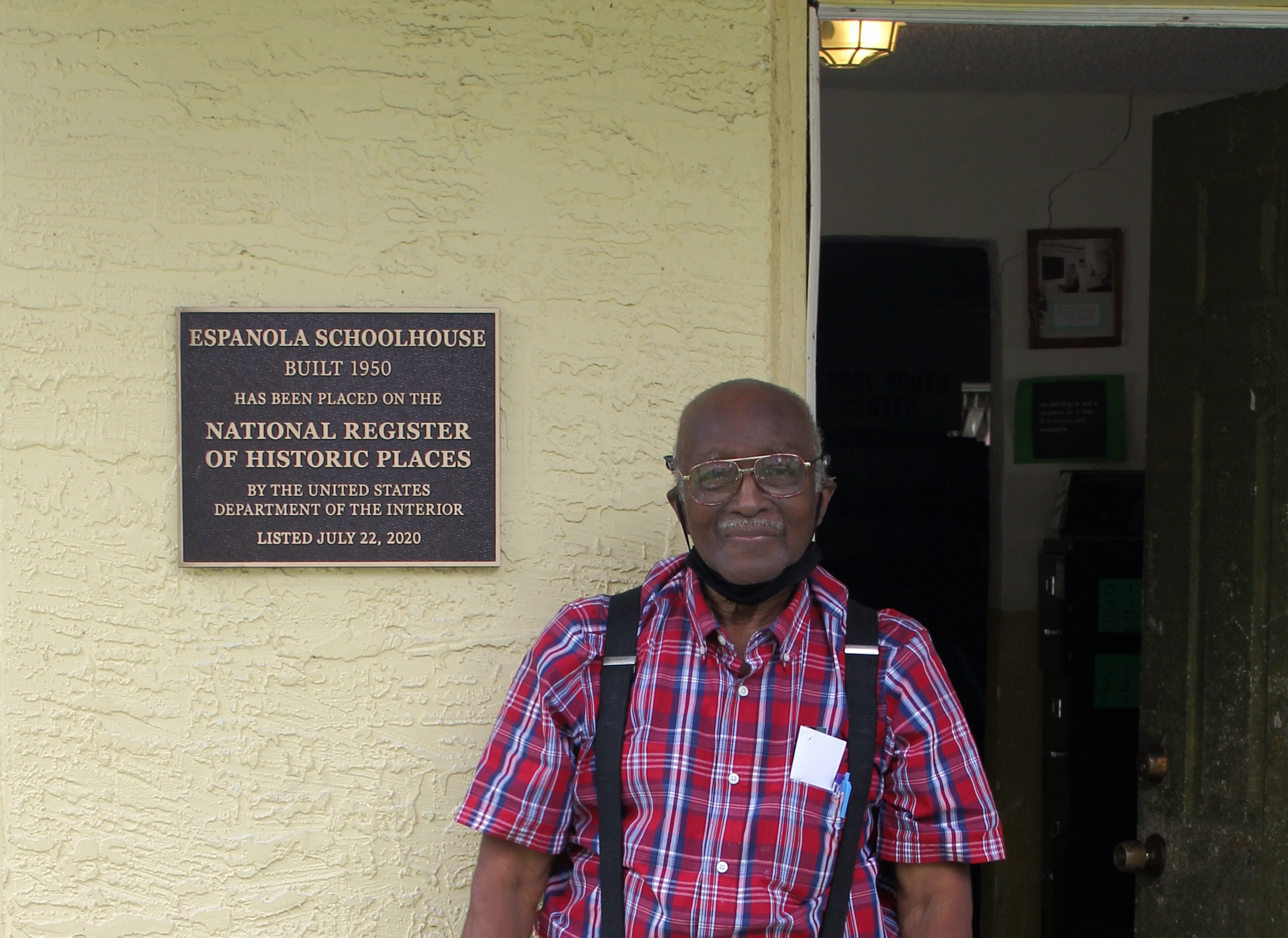
Espanola Schoolhouse - Plaque Installed - Rev. Frank Giddens standing next to the plaque - Photo taken September 28, 2020

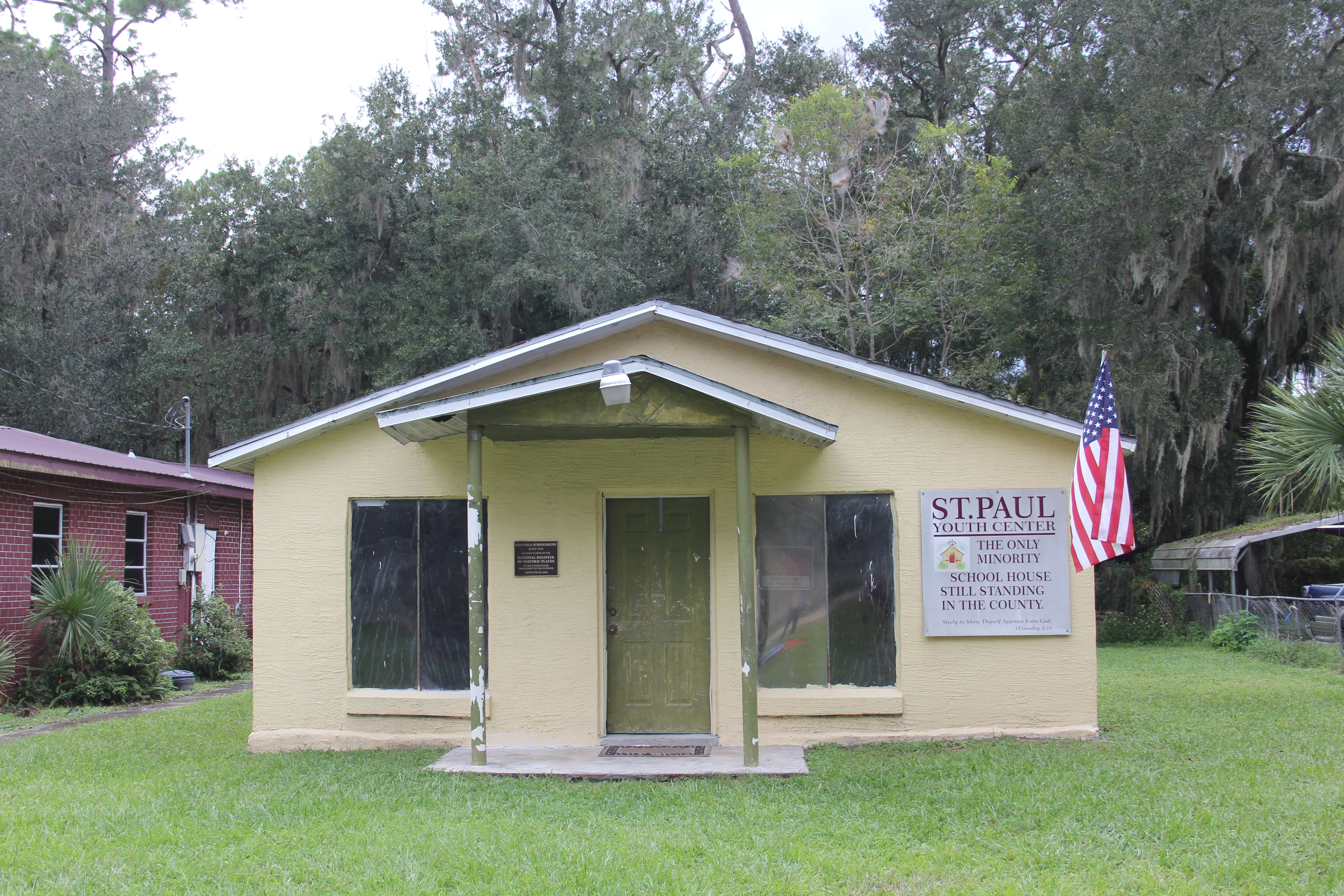
Espanola Schoolhouse - full front view of the building with the bronze NRHP plaque installed - Photo taken September 28, 2020
Historic photographs taken in 2019
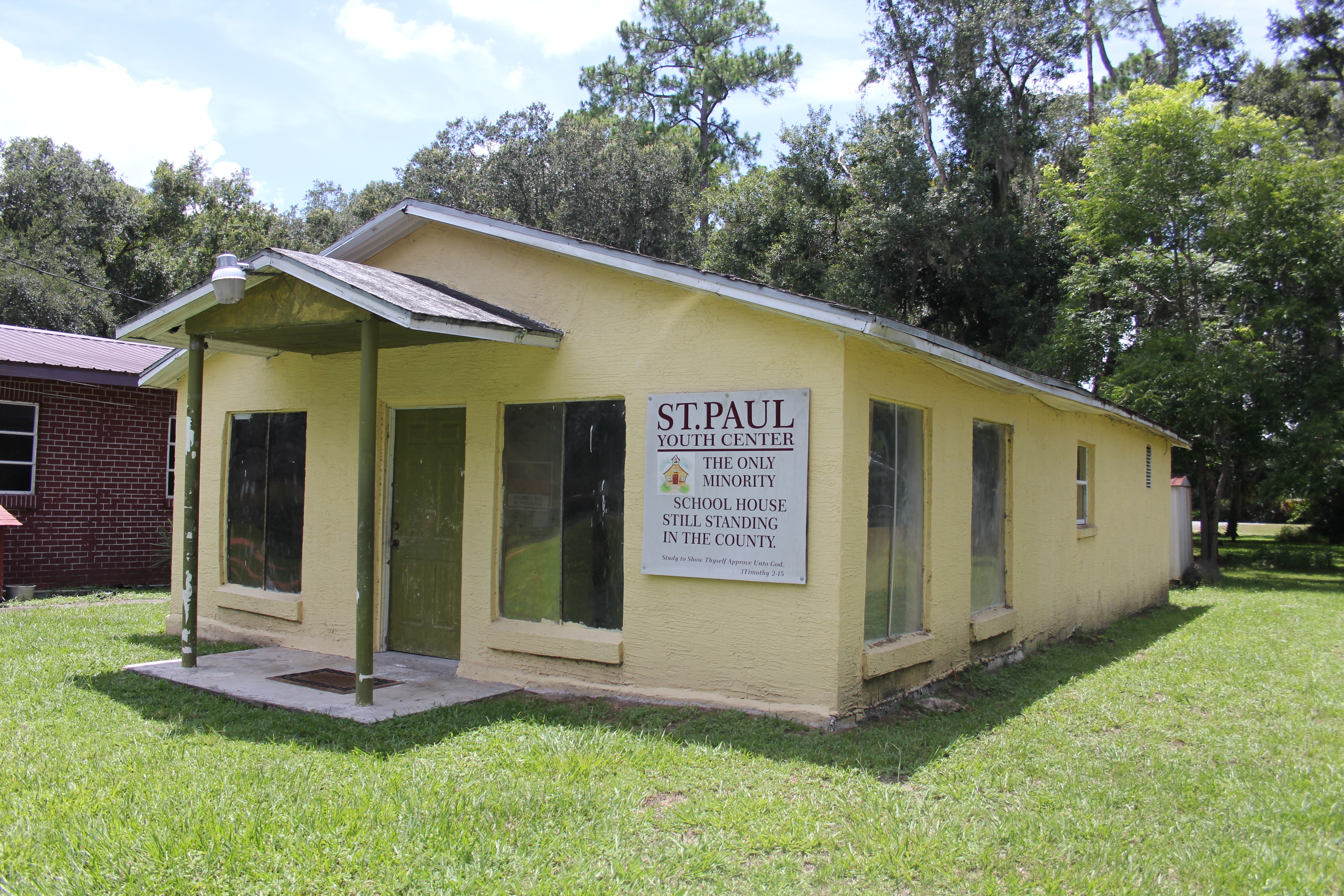
NE View of the Espanola Schoolhouse - Photo taken July 23, 2019

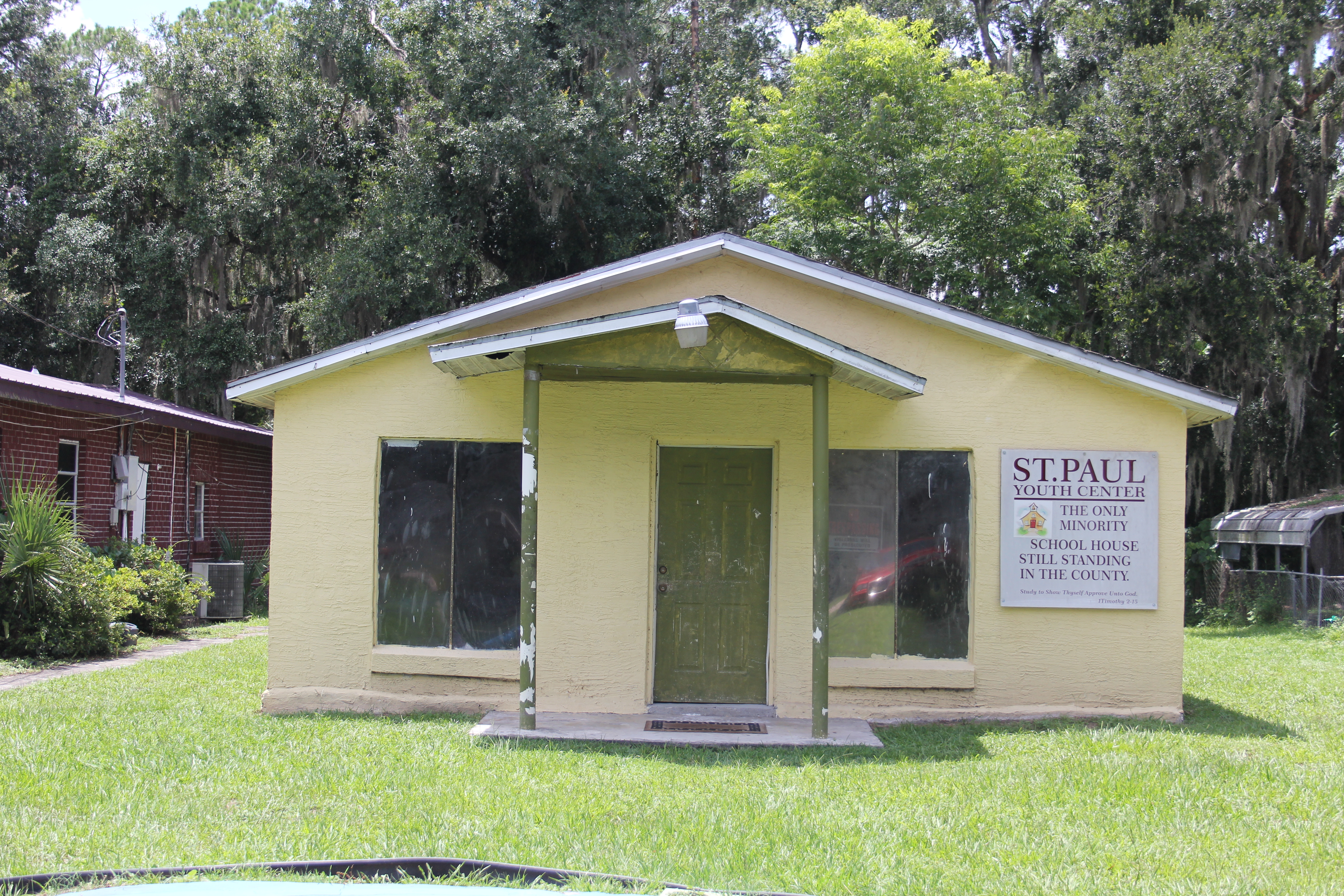
Full Front of the Espanola Schoolhouse - Photo taken July 23, 2019
