= Holden House =

- U.S. National Register of Historic Places
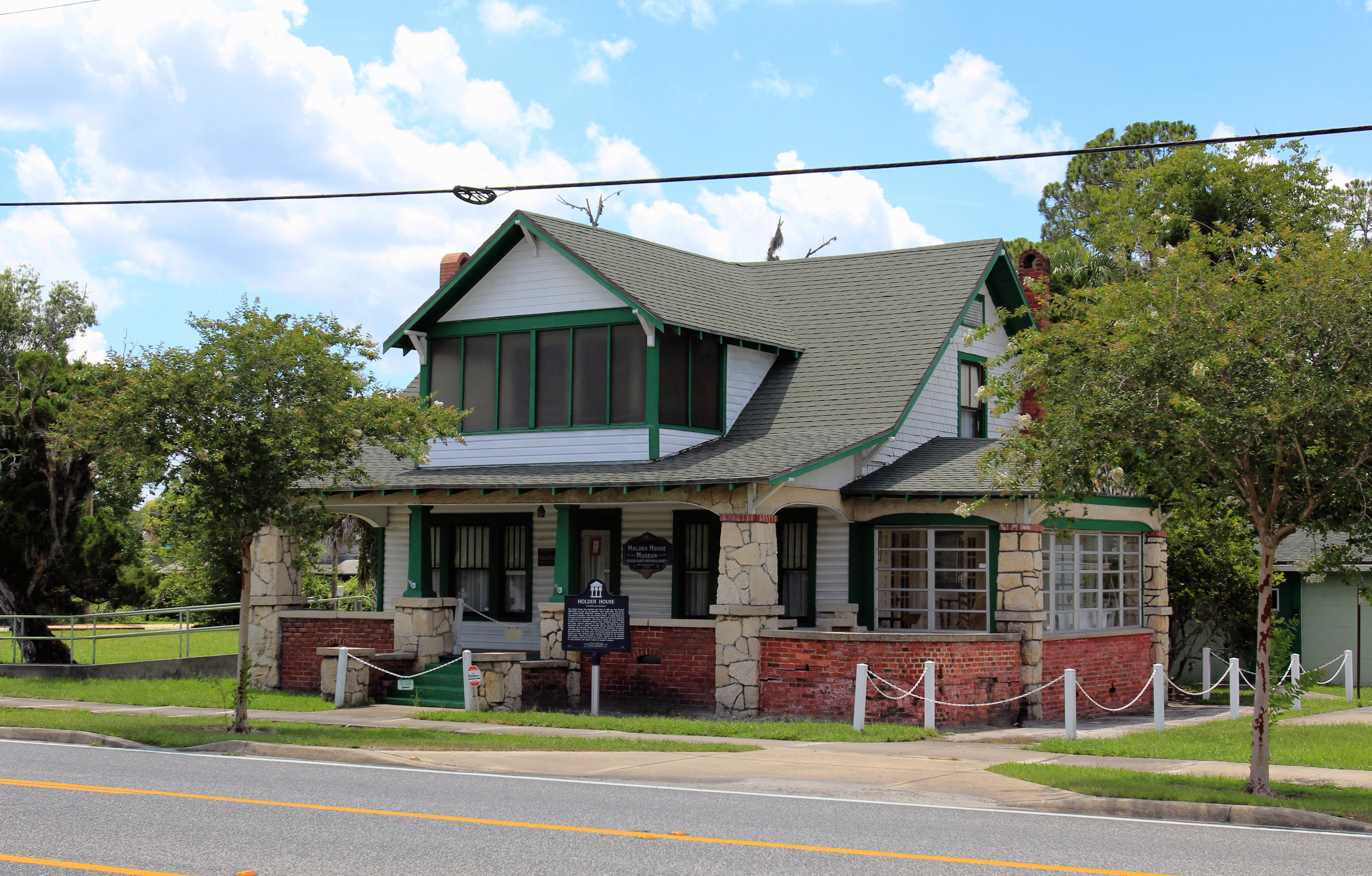
- A southeast view of the Holden House in Bunnell, Florida (taken on July 1, 2019).

- Location within Florida Location within the United States
- Interactive map showing the location of Holden House
- Location: 204 E. Moody Blvd., Bunnell, Florida
- Coordinates: 29°28′0.079″N 81°15′25.449″W
- Area: 0.297 acres (0.120 ha)
- Built: 1918
- Architect: Samuel Merwin Bortree (1859-1918)
- Architectural style: Bungalow form / American Craftsman style
- NRHP reference No.: 100003020
- Added to NRHP: October 16, 2018

The Holden House, located at 204 E. Moody Blvd., Bunnell, Florida, was built in 1918 by Samuel Merwin Bortree (1859–1918) as a wedding gift for his daughter Ethel Lura Bortree Holden (1892–1977), and her husband Thomas Edward Holden (1892–1974). It is an excellent example of the Craftsman Bungalow architectural style. The house was purchased by Flagler County for $40,000 on August 6, 1979 from a Holden family member. It is now a museum that features artifacts from Flagler County and the general Florida area dating from the St. Johns Culture (500 BCE) to the present. It is also the headquarters for the Flagler County Historical Society. The house's upstairs bathroom was one of the first indoor bathrooms in the Bunnell area and features unique small hexagon tiles on the floor which were similar to the flooring design used in the original owner's pharmacy building (Holden's Pharmacy) which is no longer extant and was located at the southwest corner of the intersection of Moody Boulevard and U.S. 1 in Bunnell. The Holden House was listed on the National Register of Historic Places on October 16, 2018 (Reference Number: SG100003020).

== Holden House History and Architectural Attributes ==
The style of the Holden House is Craftsman Bungalow which was a popular architectural design in the United States from around 1900 to the mid-1930s. Craftsman Bungalow style houses are known for their many fine details and excellent workmanship. The style was influenced by earlier homes that were built by British colonists in India. This house style, which includes the Holden House, is defined by features that include wood construction, a low-pitched gabled roof with broad eaves, large front porches, practical floor plans, plastered ceilings, a fireplace and casement windows. A unique feature on the Holden House was the use of colorful pieces of apothecary bottles (glass mosaic) that were inset in the front gable. In 2016, Hurricane Matthew knocked the glass mosaic off of the gable of the front dormer. Early in 2019, white aluminum siding was installed on the gable of the front dormer to replace the glass mosaic. When the sun porch was added, sometime in the 1930s, the gable was inset with an array of multi-colored antique glass, broken dishes and at least one automobile tail light in an attempt to make it look similar to the front gable's original design.

The Holden House, now more than 100 years old, is mostly in original condition. The locally quarried coquina rock along the front porch is original. The sash windows are replacements. The chimney on the southwest side of the house was replaced a few years ago because roofers performing repairs accidentally knocked some of it down. The fireplace in the living room originally contained a kerosene stove that heated the house during the winter. The Holden's had residential air conditioning and heating installed in the house in the 1950s. The wood trim and most of the interior doors are original to the house as is the plate rail in the dining room. The kitchen sink and appliances have all been replaced but the wood cabinets are original. The breakthrough between the kitchen and dining room is original and was used for family gatherings and social events. Some of the downstairs pine wood flooring was damaged by termites and had to be removed. It was replaced by removing and installing the same undamaged wood flooring from closets on the second floor. The downstairs bathroom was added years after the house was built. A prominent feature of the second floor is an outside screened porch that is accessed through the master bedroom.

In 1988, a $57,000 historical grant from the State of Florida was awarded and a portion was used for a major renovation of the house. This is one of the main reasons the house is now in excellent cosmetic and structural condition.

In 2010, more than $23,000 was invested in additional repairs that included the replacement of damaged exterior wood siding and trim, exterior painting (which restored the house's exterior to its original color: white with green trim), installation of a metal hand rail on the rear porch, replacement of windows and the remodeling of the upstairs bathroom which included the installation of period-correct fixtures.

=== Holden Family History ===
Thomas Holden was born and raised in Palatka, FL and moved to Bunnell in 1914. He was a prominent Flagler County pharmacist, businessman, realtor, community activist and politician. In 1916, he purchased the Smith Drug Store in Bunnell and changed its name to Holden's Pharmacy where he began operating his pharmaceutical business. He married Ethel Lura Bortree Holden on December 25, 1917 and they had two daughters, Altajane Caudill (1919-2007), and Eleanor "Tommie" Black Shutt (1926-2017), who were raised in the house and later became pharmacists. In 1920, his political career began when he was elected Mayor of Bunnell. In 1924, he was appointed a School Trustee of Bunnell High School. In 1926, he opened, owned and operated the Holden Realty Company in Bunnell. In 1930, he built a new brick commercial building in Bunnell where he moved his Holden's Pharmacy, and operated this business in that building until he sold it in 1951. In 1938, he became a director and later an Executive Vice President of the Citizens Bank of Bunnell. He was a member of the Order of Eastern Star, Bunnell Lodge #200 Free & Accepted Masons, and an Ambassador of the Morocco Temple of Jacksonville. He also served as a director of the Federal Housing Agency in Flagler County. In 1967, he was honored by the Florida State Pharmaceutical Association for his 50 years as a registered pharmacist.

=== Holden House Annex ===
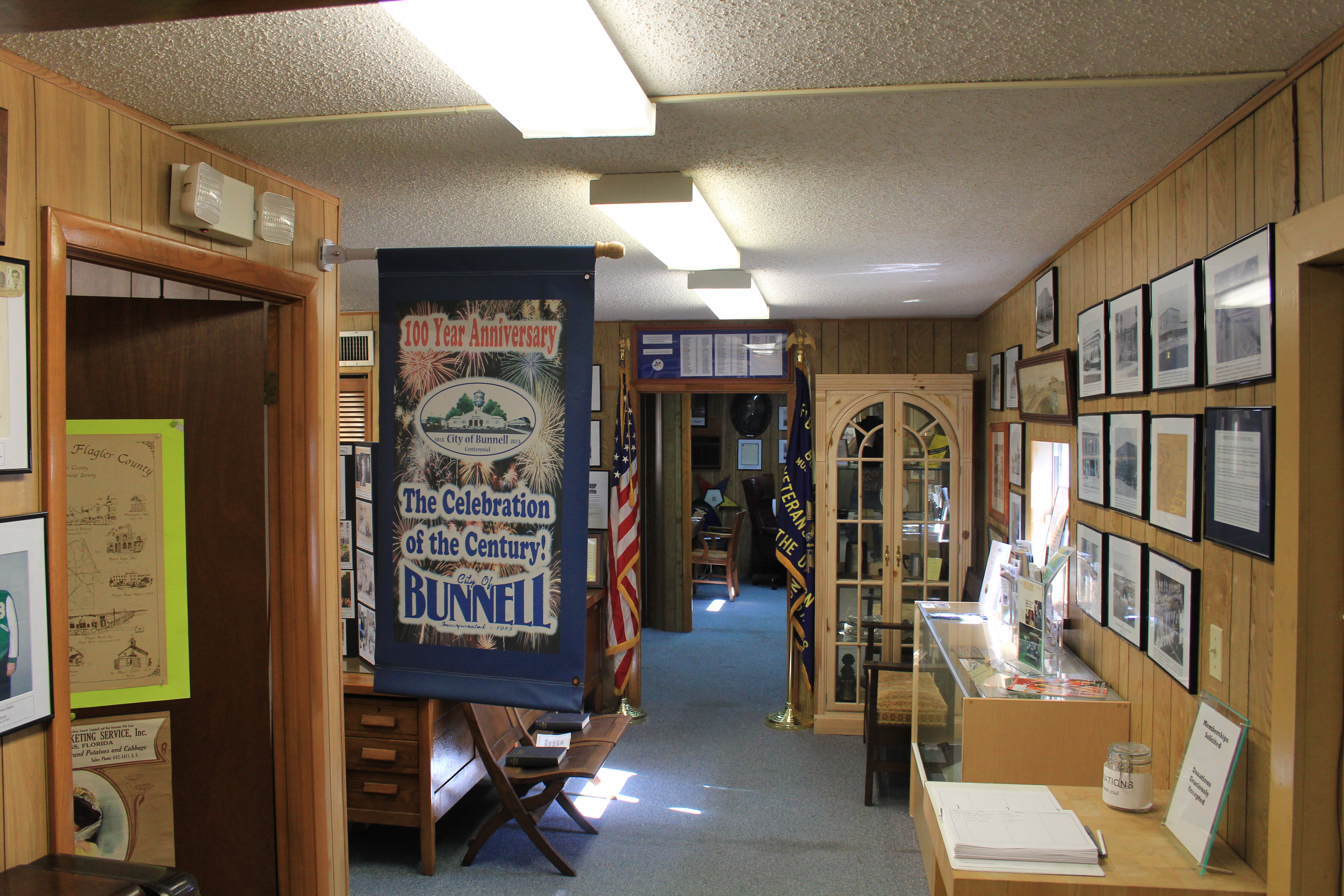
Interior View of the Holden House Annex Building - looking eastward.

The Holden House Annex is a rectangular cinder block structure behind the Holden House (and part of the Holden House property) that once housed Flagler County's Veterans Services. It now houses the Flagler County Historical Society's offices and archival and artifacts repository, and offers local research opportunities. Items include: furniture, radios, historic subject files, clothing, hats, more than 400 maps, bound volumes of the Flagler Tribune (1918-1980), copies of the Bunnell Home Builder (1912-1918), hundreds of loose and framed photographs, thousands of obituaries that were published in local newspapers, historic books and magazines, and a searchable family database with over 250,000 family names from Florida and Georgia.

== Holden House Listed on the National Register of Historic Places ==
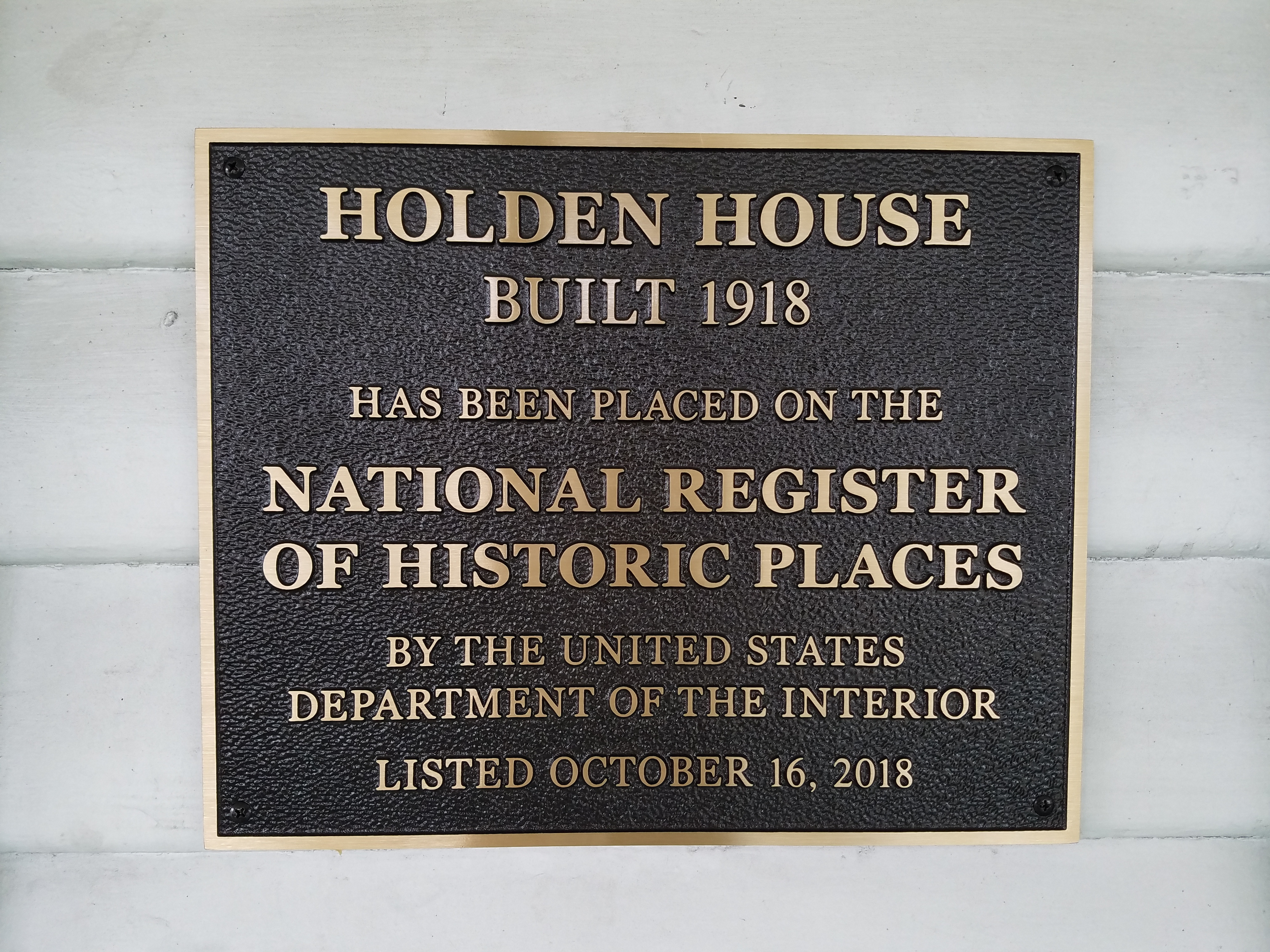
Bronze National Register of Historic Places plaque mounted onto the Holden House (left side of the front door).

The initial nomination was approved by the Florida National Register Review Board on August 9, 2018 and was then sent to the U.S. Department of the Interior, National Park Service for final approval by the Keeper of the National Register. On October 16, 2018, the Holden House was officially listed on the National Register of Historic Places.
