= Bunnell Coquina City Hall =

- Bunnell City Hall
- U.S. National Register of Historic Places
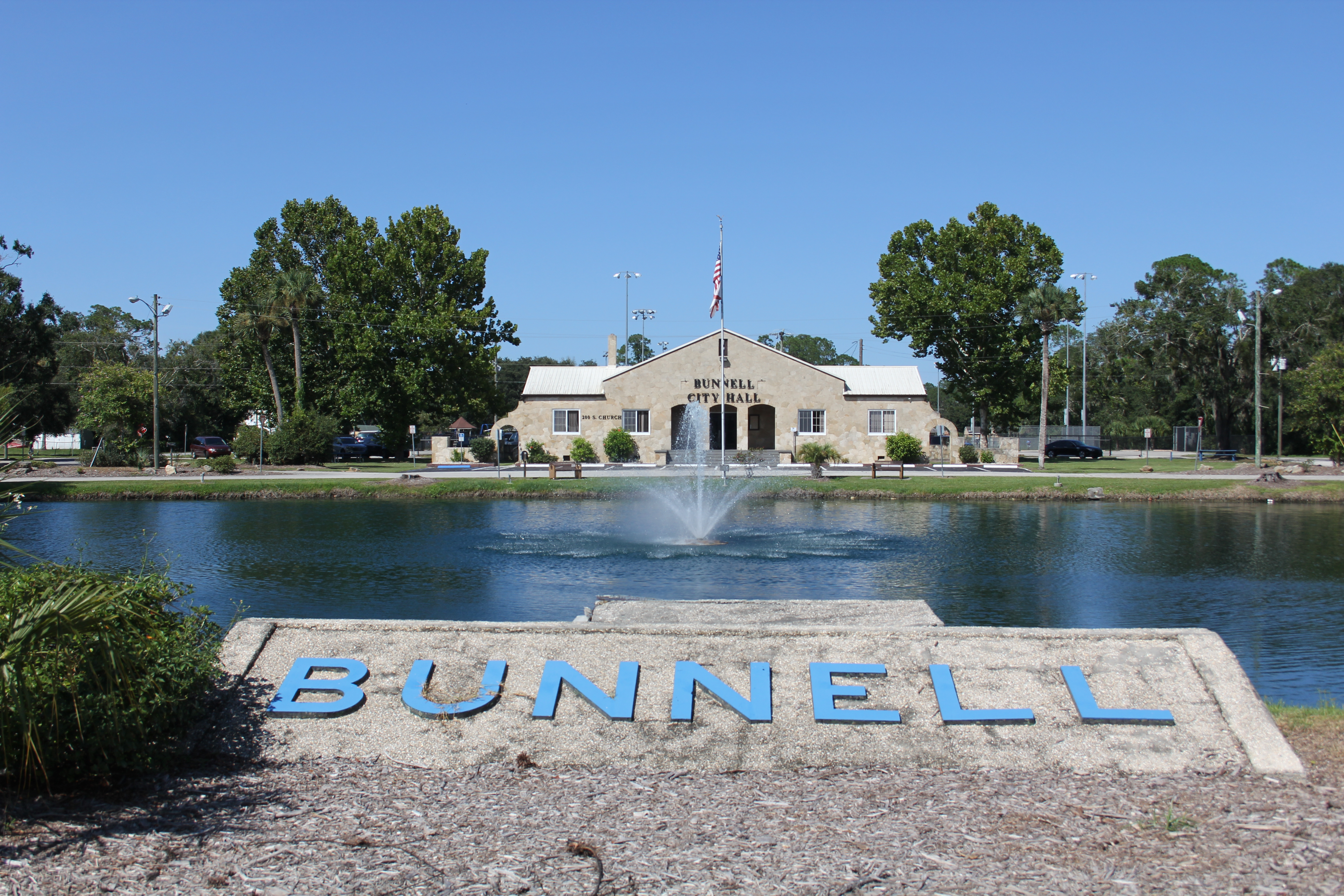
- Bunnell Coquina City Hall - distant full front view with Lake Lucille & fountain

- Location within Florida Location within the United States
- Location: 200 South Church Street, Bunnell, Florida
- Coordinates: 29°28′0.079″N 81°15′25.449″W
- Area: 2.946 acres (1.192 ha)
- Built: 1936–1937
- Architectural style: WPA Rustic
- MPS: Florida's New Deal Resources
- NRHP reference No.: 100003406
- Added to NRHP: 4 February 2019

The Bunnell Coquina City Hall (also known as the Bunnell Civic Center and the Bunnell City Hall) is a unique one-story public building constructed of locally quarried coquina stone. The property is located at 200 South Church Street, Bunnell, FL 32110 in the downtown section of the city. It includes man-made Lake Lucille with its jetting fountain in the front of the building, which creates an impressive visual appeal to the setting of the property. It was built in 1936–1937 with grant funding from the Work Progress Administration (WPA).

The Bunnell Coquina City Hall building is an important part of Bunnell's local history as it provided a community meeting, library and recreation facility to the area during intense economic turmoil which could not have been possible without New Deal funding. Furthermore, it was instrumental in providing employment for unemployed locals during the Great Depression which assisted the local economy.

== Construction project ==
Construction started in 1936 as Zachary Dean Holland, a well-known local contractor, was elected superintendent of the project. Holland hired another local construction worker, John Swain, as foreman to assist with the challenging project. They hired any man in need of a job, regardless of construction experience or skill level. As the project progressed, the pace became slower than originally scheduled. Most workers did not have experience working with coquina stone which complicated the construction process. On October 10, 1936, M.J. Castro, construction superintendent for the WPA in the district that included Bunnell, authorized Holland to hire an additional 40 workers in an attempt to expedite the project towards its January 1, 1937, scheduled completion date.

The building stands on a concrete foundation with 13-inch-thick exterior walls made from coquina stone. WPA workers hand shaped and smoothed the coquina stone into irregular configurations using axes. Tool marks are still visible on many of the coquina stones. The project was successfully completed in early 1937. The WPA then turned responsibility over to the City of Bunnell.

== Architectural attributes ==
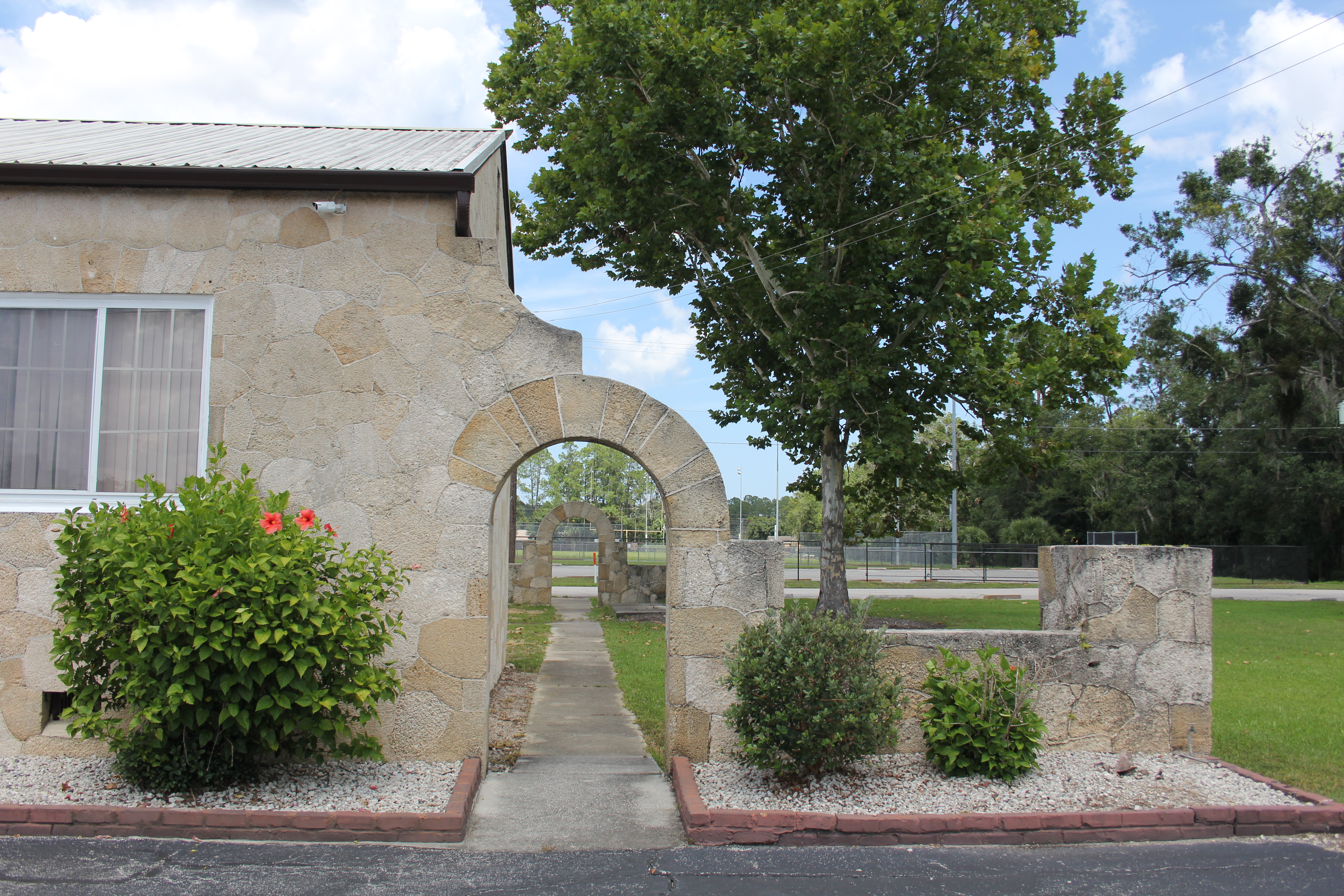
SW Front view of the Bunnell Coquina City Hall with archway and sidewalk

Its architectural styling, WPA Rustic, reflects the availability of local construction materials coupled with local building traditions and public needs. The building also contains Mission Revival style architectural characteristics which include its four side arched walkways and front arched entrance way. The top canopy on the interior of the porch is finished with paneled wood. All three entrance ways are topped with coquina stone jack arch lintels. Affixed signage in black lettering that reads “Bunnell City Hall” is centrally located above the three bay arched colonnades. A shield-shaped date stone plaque is recessed into the coquina stone and it reads “WPA 1937”. The address of the building “200 S. Church” is displayed with affixed signage in black lettering and located at the northern section of the front of the building. The fenestration of the windows on the front of the building are modern vinyl sliding sash windows that have replaced the original wood framed style windows. All the window apertures are topped with coquina stone jack arched lintels.

== Lake Lucille ==
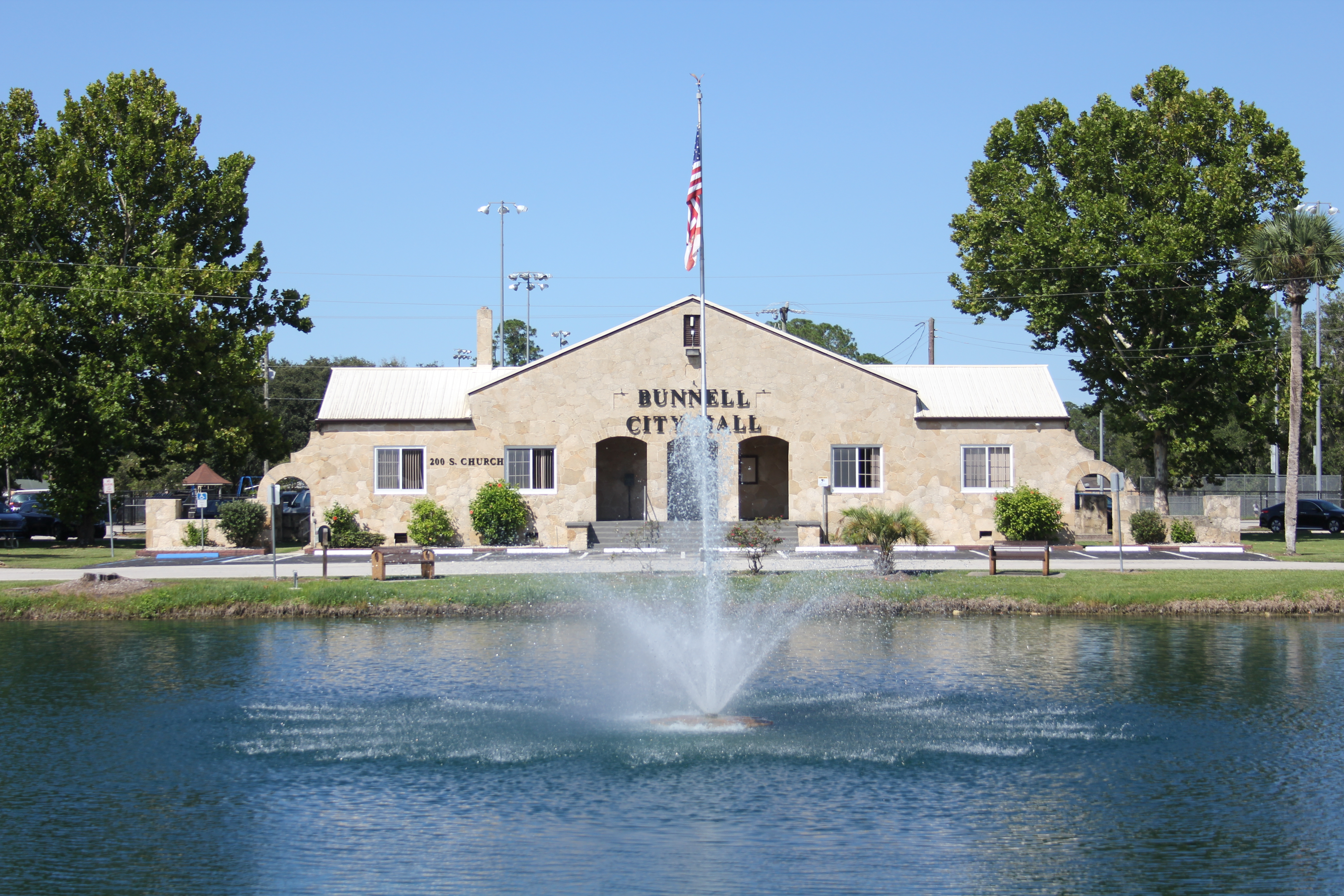
Front view of the Bunnell City Hall and Lake Lucille

In front of the Bunnell City Hall building is Lake Lucille. It was once a cypress mud hole that was systematically shoveled out by hand by WPA workers in 1936–1937. The mud that was extracted was moved by wheelbarrows and used to level the four blocks of land behind the City Hall building. Water was then pumped in to create the oval shaped man-made lake. Fishing tournaments for children were once hosted in Lake Lucille. In the 1960s, a fountain was installed in the middle of Lake Lucille which provides a showering show of jetting water and is a key element of the property's landscape and setting. A paved road runs around Lake Lucille that allows pedestrians and motorists various viewing angles.

== Building interior ==
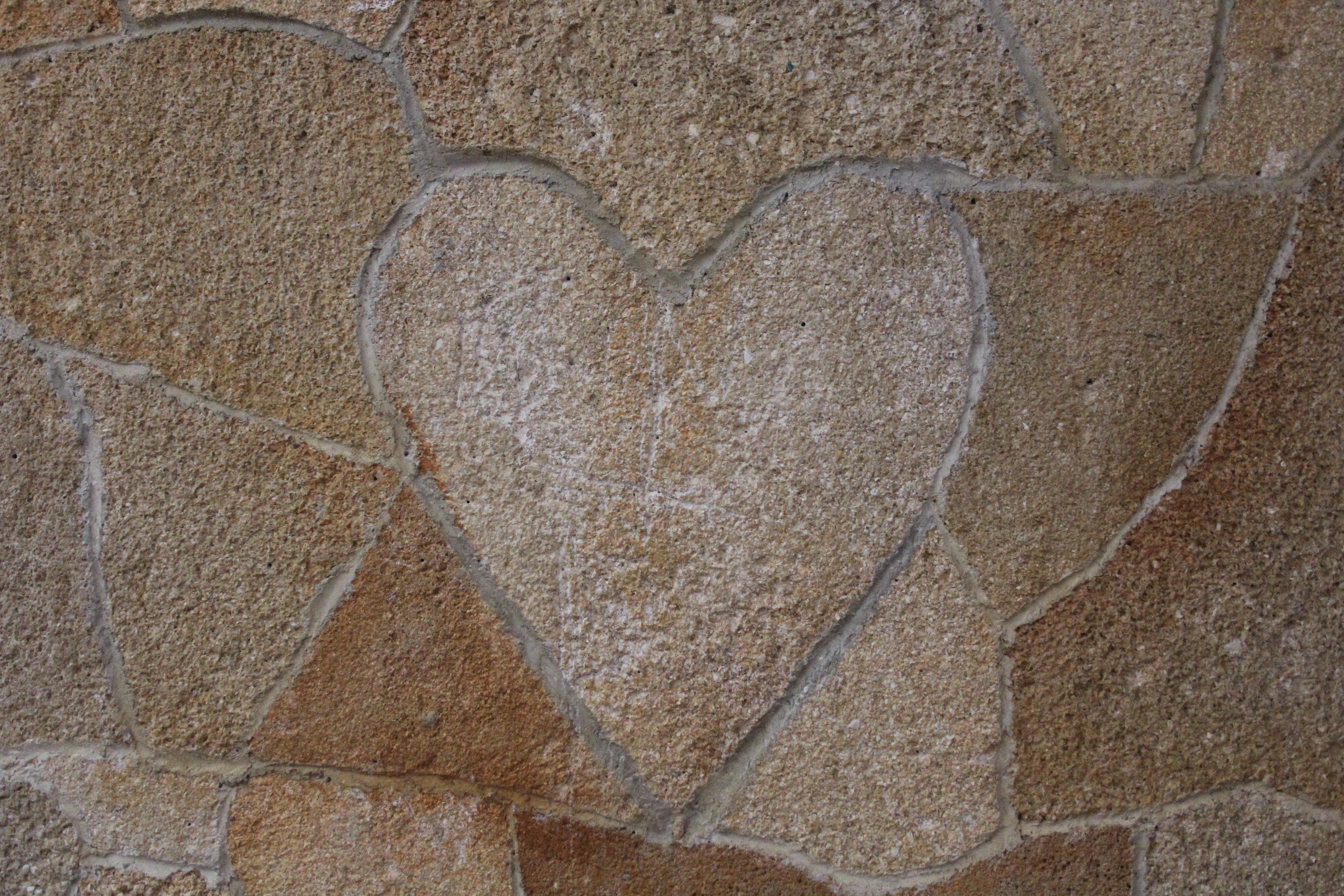
Heart-shaped coquina stone

The interior of the building features a large centrally located primary room, the auditorium, with secondary rooms flanking it and adjacent to the rear of the building. The auditorium's walls are irregularly shaped coquina stone and the window apertures are topped with coquina stone jack arched lintels. WPA workers created two interesting sculptured coquina stones as one is a heart and the other a dog head shape. The flooring is original pine wood that has been refinished.

The northwest and southwest office areas have a plain wood door entrance from the auditorium. These room's have their original walls that are irregularly shaped coquina stone. The window apertures are topped with coquina stone jack arched lintels. A dropped tile acoustic ceiling was installed in the 1980s to conceal ductwork and electrical cables of a central air conditioning system. The original wood ceiling and beams are now concealed.

The rear of the auditorium includes two closets, the kitchen, women's and men's bathrooms. Metal swinging doors lead to both the women's and men's bathrooms. A centrally located modern wood paneled door leads into the kitchen. Wood cabinets, an exhaust hood, stove and a refrigerator have been installed in the kitchen as well as linoleum flooring.

== Listing on the National Register of Historic Places ==
The initial nomination was approved by the Florida National Register Review Board on November 8, 2018, and was then sent to the U.S. Department of the Interior, National Park Service for final approval by the Keeper of the National Register. On February 4, 2019, the Bunnell Coquina City Hall was officially listed under a multiple nomination (Florida's New Deal Resources MPS) on the National Register of Historic Places.
