= St. Mary Catholic Church (Korona, Florida) =

Historic Building Located in Bunnell, Florida, US

- U.S. National Register of Historic Places
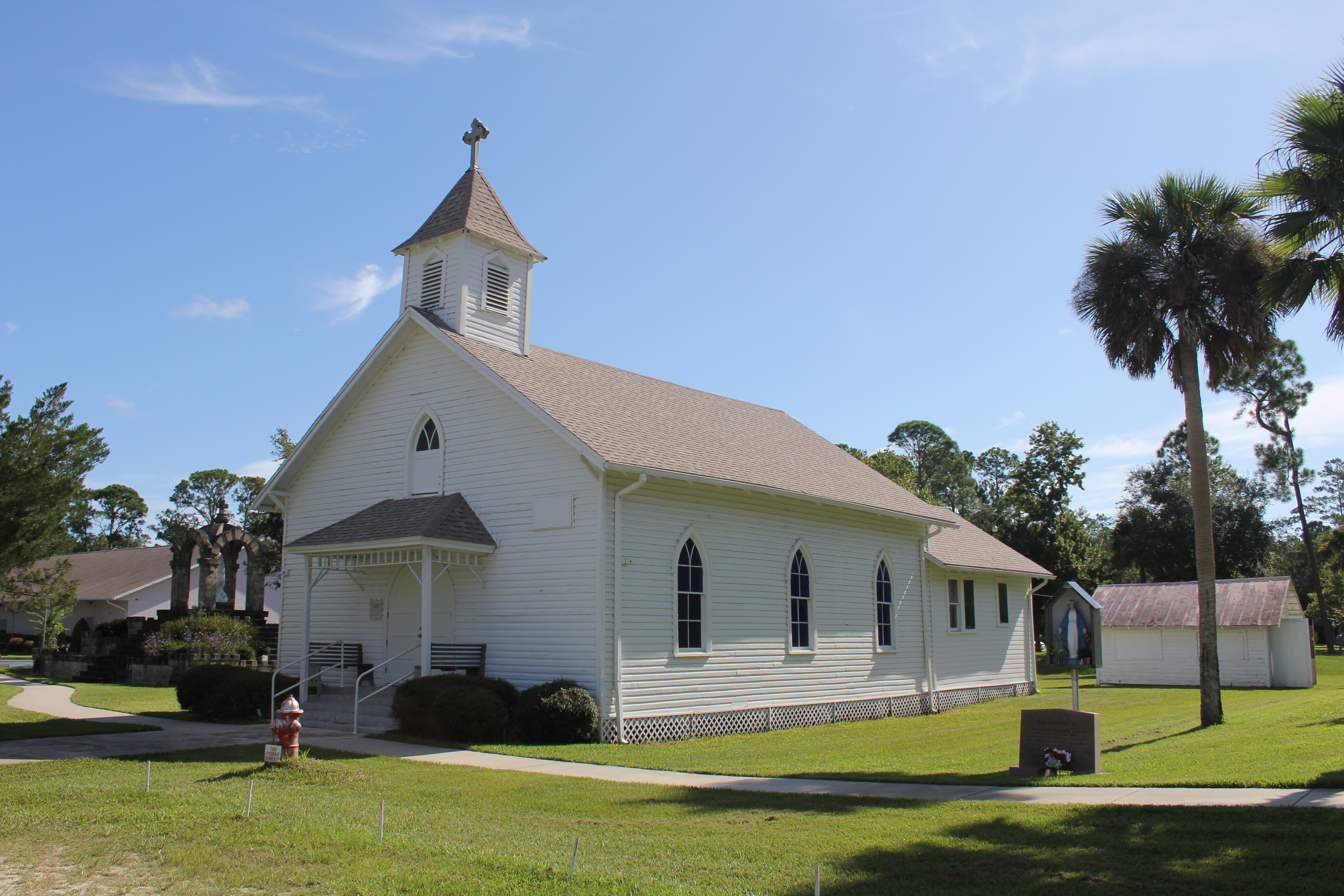
- St. Mary Catholic Church - Front Right Side View (Photo taken August 21, 2019)

- Location within Florida Location within the United States
- Location: 89 St. Mary’s Place, Bunnell, Florida
- Coordinates: 29°40′52.30″N 81°19′37.60″W
- Area: 1,955 square feet (180 m^{2})
- Built: 1914
- Architectural style: Carpenter Gothic (Gothic Revival)
- NRHP reference No.: SG100009785
- Added to NRHP: January 25, 2024

The St. Mary Catholic Church (also known as the St. Mary Mother Church) is located in Bunnell, Florida. The architectural style of the wood framed St. Mary Catholic Church is Carpenter Gothic (Gothic Revival). In the early 1910s, after several families of Polish descent decided to relocate to Korona, Florida, they raised $1000 to build a Catholic church in the town. Korona means “crown” in Polish, signifying the patron saint of Poland, the Blessed Virgin Mary, who is also referred to as “Queen of Poland.” They constructed the church building in 1914 and originally named it St. Mary, Queen of Poland, Catholic Church, but later changed its name to St. Mary Catholic Church. The original St. Mary Catholic Church is still in use for daily mass, baptisms, funerals, weddings and silent prayer services.

From its beginning, the St. Mary Catholic Church building has been a focal point for the Korona community. It continues to remain intimately connected with the spiritual and cultural lives of the area's citizens. The St. Mary Catholic Church is the oldest church building in Flagler County.

The property where the St. Mary Catholic Church is located includes the Shrine of Saint Christopher and four other buildings: Parish Thrift Store, Storage Shed, Parish Center Office and the Main Church.

== Architectural attributes ==
The St. Mary Catholic Church has 1955 square feet as it measures 31 feet wide by 62 feet long and includes a 3 feet wide by 11 feet long part of the garage extension that protrudes from the northeast corner of the building.

=== Exterior ===
Most of the building's exterior has white painted solid wood board and batten siding running horizontally. Wood lattice skirting covers the underfloor access areas around the bottom of the building. There are eight lancet windows in the building. These windows are tall and narrow with a pointed arch at the top, which mimic the architectural styling found in original Gothic churches. The glass in all of the lancet windows is clear and wavy, interestingly; the St. Mary Catholic Church has never had stained glass in any of its external lancet windows. The original building had two sections added on to the back in the 1930s. One add-on section was used as living quarters for the priest, which includes a living room, bedroom, bathroom, kitchen and a safe and storage room. The other section was an automobile parking garage for the priest.

The front (west) side of the building includes a concrete porch (which replaced the original wood porch) that measures 12 feet wide by 5 feet long with four steps and right and left side round metal hand railings. Two four-paneled solid wood entrance doors with semi-circular tops, hinged to swing outward, lead the way into the church building. The porch includes two wood sitting benches and has a wood framed canopy roof with asphalt shingles that match the building's main roof. Wood pillars support the canopy roof and the fascia includes vertical jig-sawn wood trim fretwork supported by wood braces attached at a 45-degree angle. A sign on the left side of the entrance doors reads, “St. Mary’s Church – Built by a Group of Polish Immigrants in 1914.” There is one centrally located lancet window above the canopy. The bottom section has two vertical panes that are painted white, and the top section has three lancet shaped panes with clear wavy glass.

The right (south) side of the building includes three lancet windows in the original front section. Each of these windows has four vertical clear wavy glass panes in their bottom section, and two vertical panes and three lancet shaped panes with clear wavy glass in their top section. The rear add-on section of the right side includes three double hung windows with clear flat glass panes. The left (north) side of the building includes four lancet windows in the original front section. Each of these windows has four vertical clear wavy glass panes in their bottom section, and two vertical panes and three lancet shaped panes with clear wavy glass in their top section. The rear add-on automobile garage section, on the northeastern corner of the building, includes two hinged swing-out wood garage doors with four panels each.

The back (east) side of the building includes a single wood rear entrance access door with a five-step concrete porch and wood handrail. There are three double hung windows (which are now covered with wood panels), and three double pane vertical windows in the garage section (which are now covered with wood panels). A wood framed canopy roof supported by two wood braces attached at a 45-degree angle extends the length of the three windows and entrance door and is covered with asphalt shingles that match the building's main roof. A vertical entrance space above the canopy roof has a hinged wood door that allows access into the attic space. A single air vent is installed near the peak of the roof in the original section of the building.

The wood framed gable roof on the original and add-on sections of the building are covered with matching asphalt shingles. Modern aluminum downspouts are installed on several areas around the building and gutters run the length of the roof. The steeple is located at the front (west) side of the building and includes four wood window openings with louvered air vents that have arrow point tops. The steeple's roof is covered with asphalt shingles that match the building's main roof. A Christian cross that is made from wood and finished with copper sheeting is affixed to the steeple's apex. A bell is installed inside the steeple that can be rung manually.

==== Exterior Picture Gallery ====
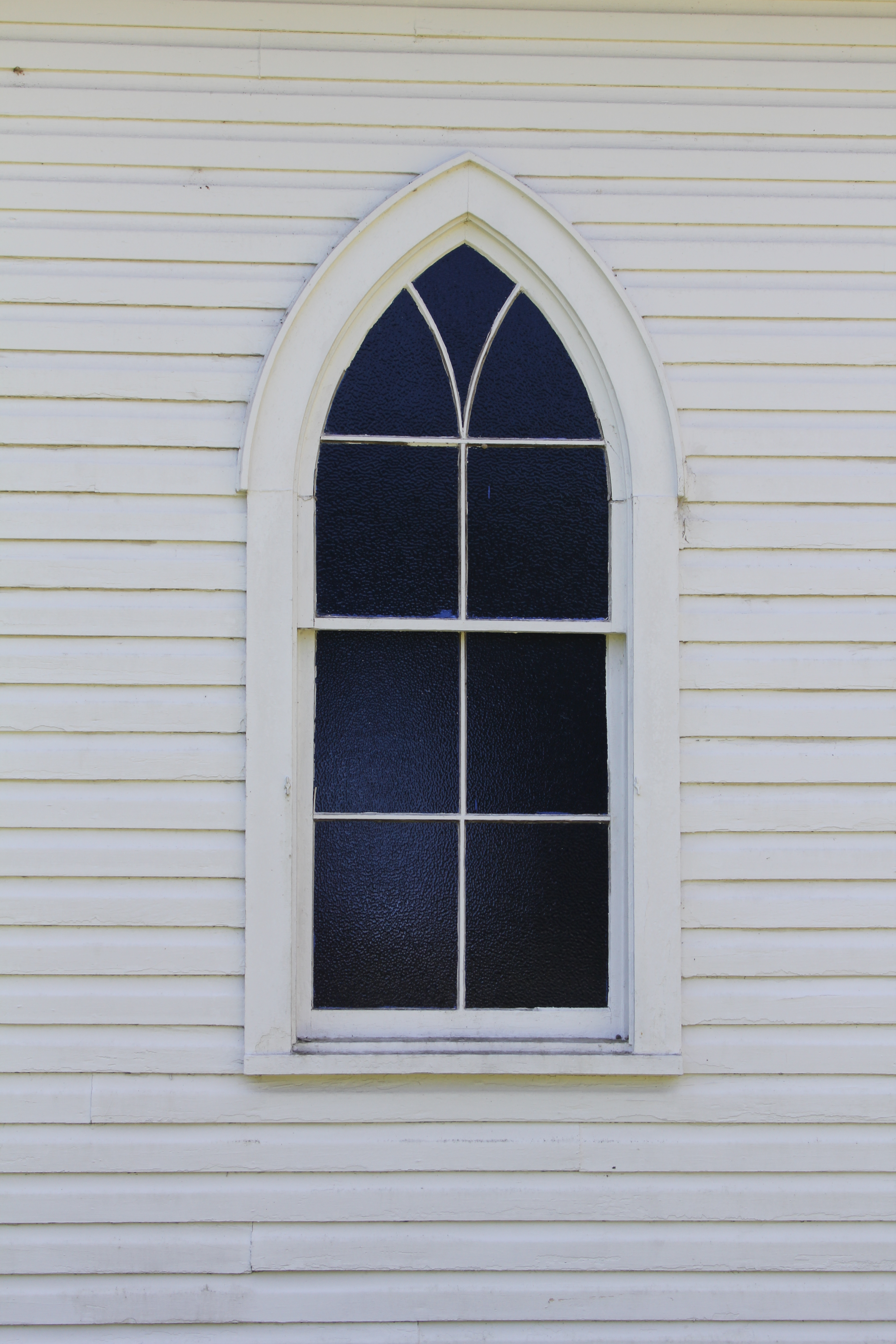
Lancet Window

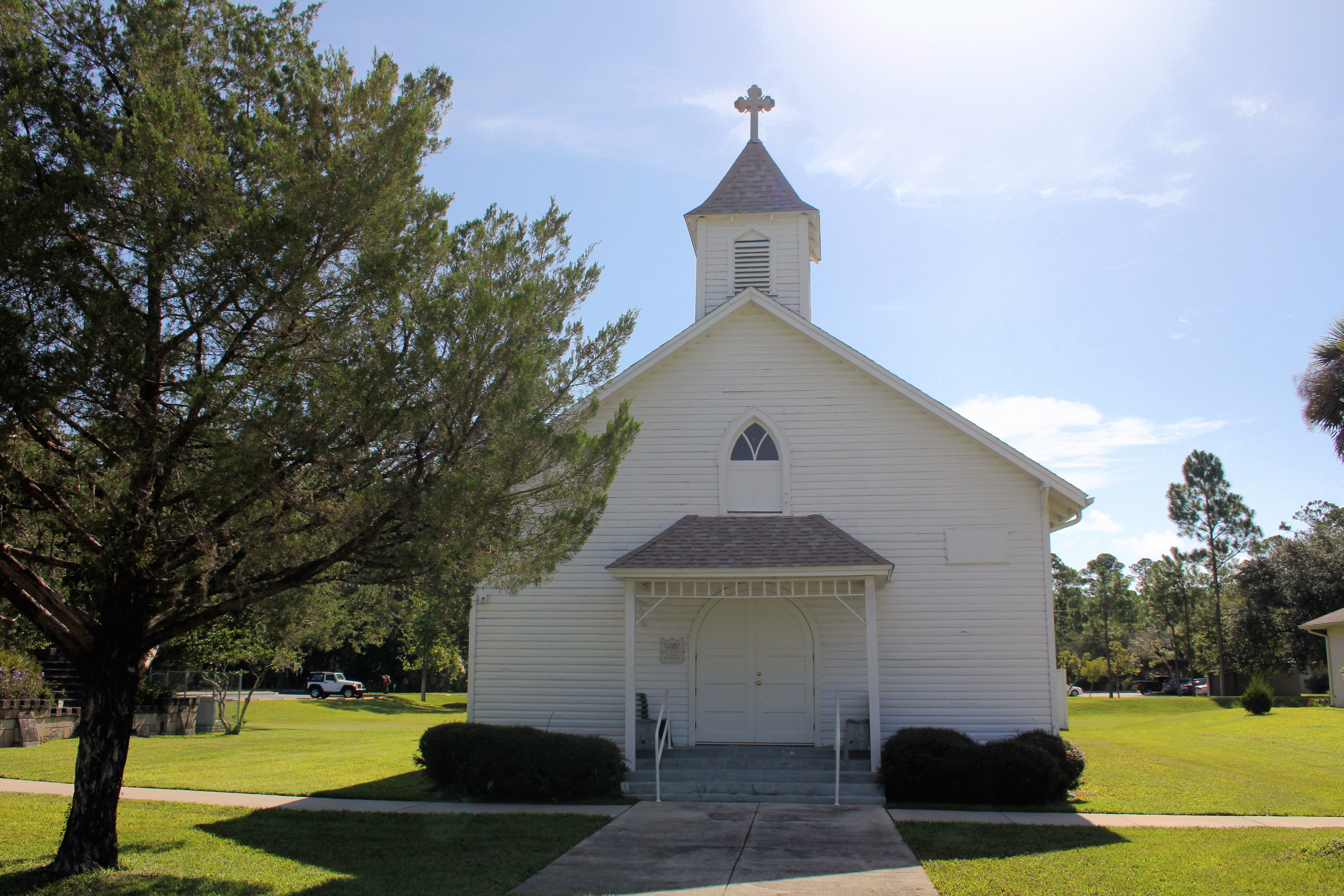
Front View

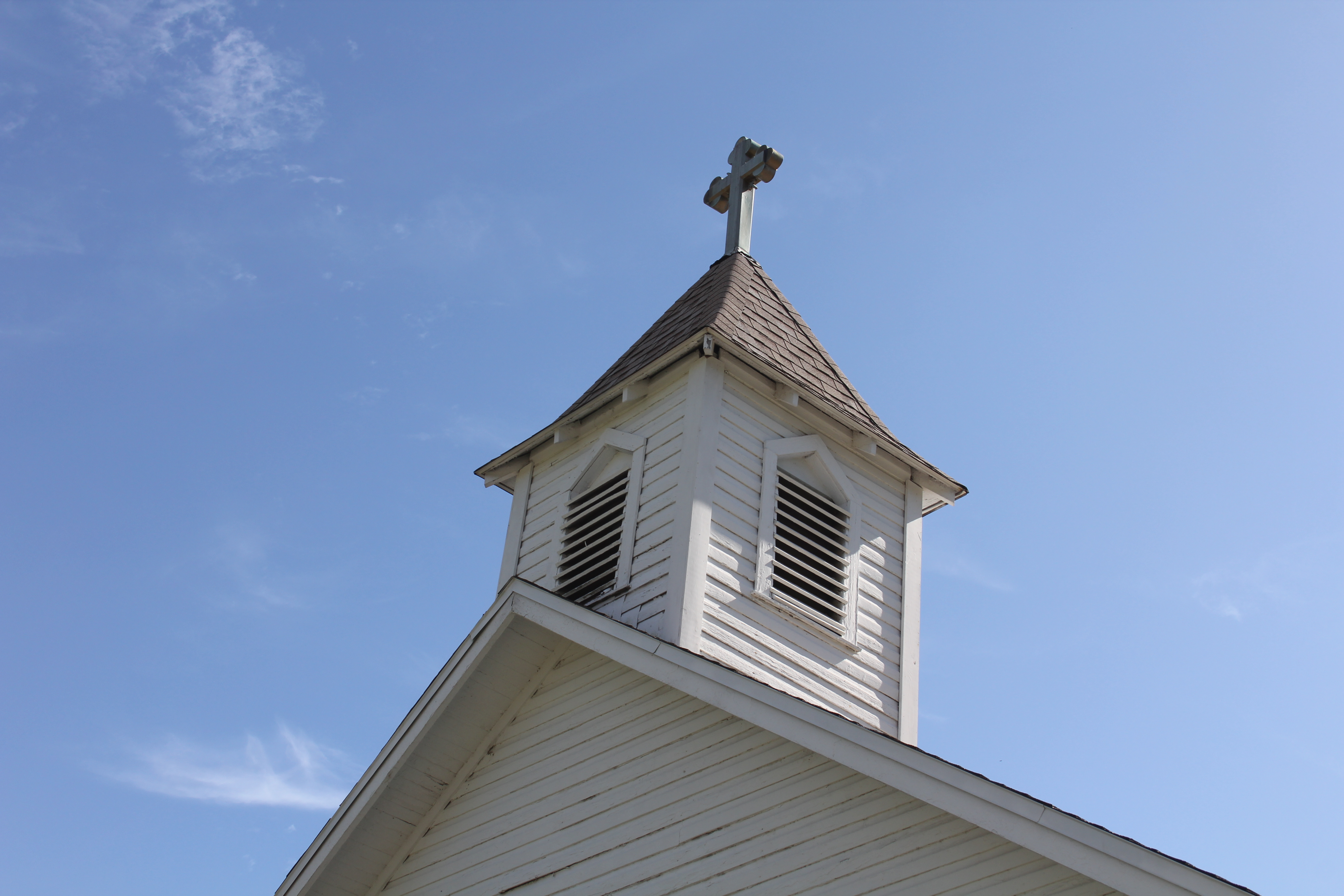
Steeple View

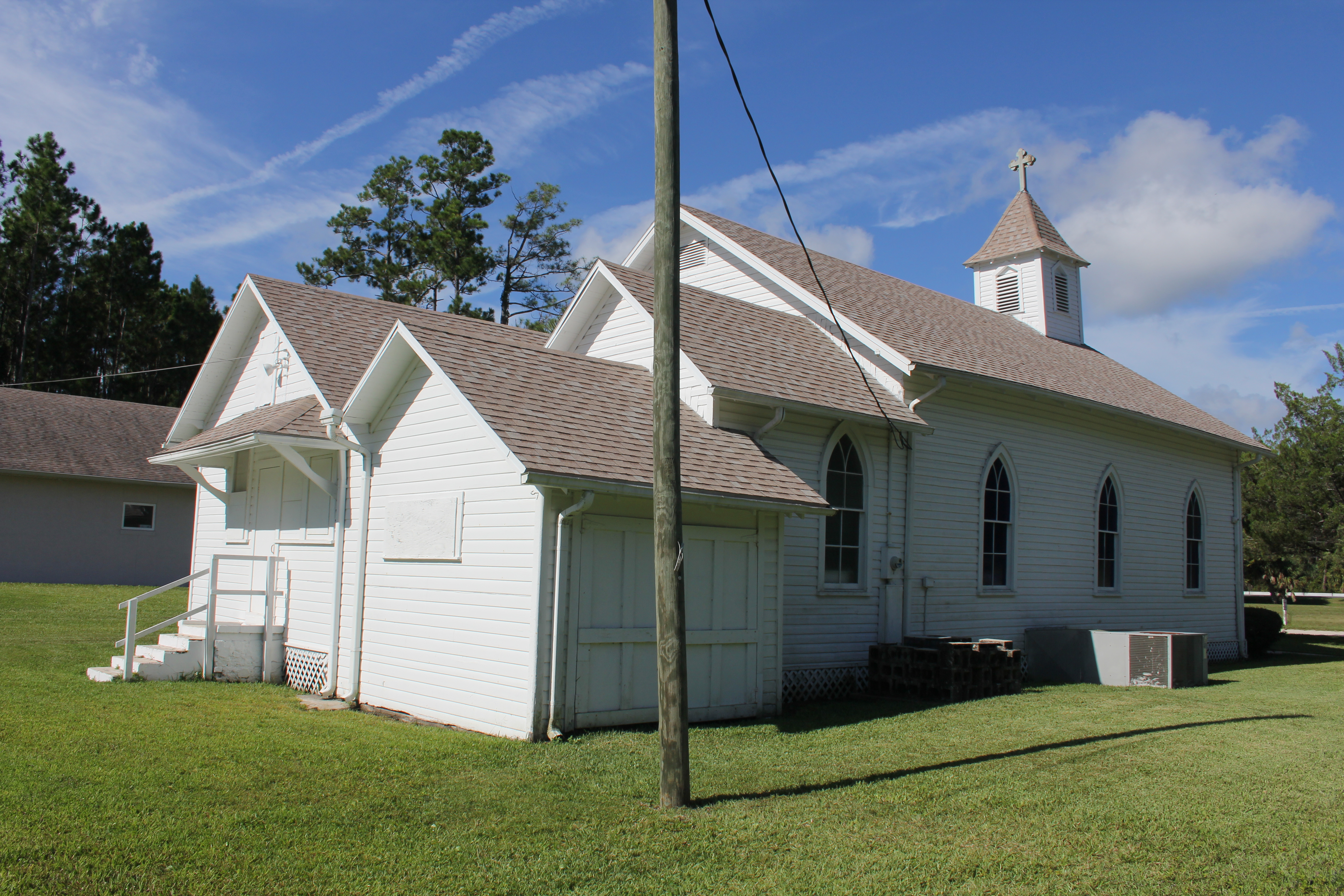
Left Back View

=== Interior ===
The interior of the church features fourteen pews, seven on each side of its central aisle. The walls in the church section, and the original sacristy room, are finished with chair molding installed horizontally at three feet six inches from the floor. Solid hardwood bead board wainscoting runs vertically from the floor to the chair molding. From above the chair molding, solid hardwood bead board wainscoting runs horizontally to the ceiling. The entire ceiling is finished with the same solid hardwood bead board wainscoting. The chair molding and all of the solid hardwood bead board wainscoting is painted white. The front entrance includes a confessional room with a single hung entrance door to the priest's area and a single hung entrance door to the parishioner's area, double entrance doors with semi-circular tops, a stairway that leads to the choir chamber and a single hung entrance door leading into a storage room under the stairway. The upper front section is the choir chambers that includes seating and a four-foot high railing wall.

The pulpit includes wood railings, a baptismal font, central altar, an additional smaller altar with a Statue of the Redeemer in Death, which is used at Easter services, and various statues, pictures and other church-related artifacts. A single hung entrance door leads into the church's original sacristy room.

The add-on section that was once the priest's living quarters includes a living room, bedroom, bathroom, kitchen and a safe and storage room safe. This area is currently being used for the storage of furniture and church artifacts. The add-on section that was once the priest's automobile parking garage is currently being used for the storage of miscellaneous maintenance items.

==== Interior Picture Gallery ====
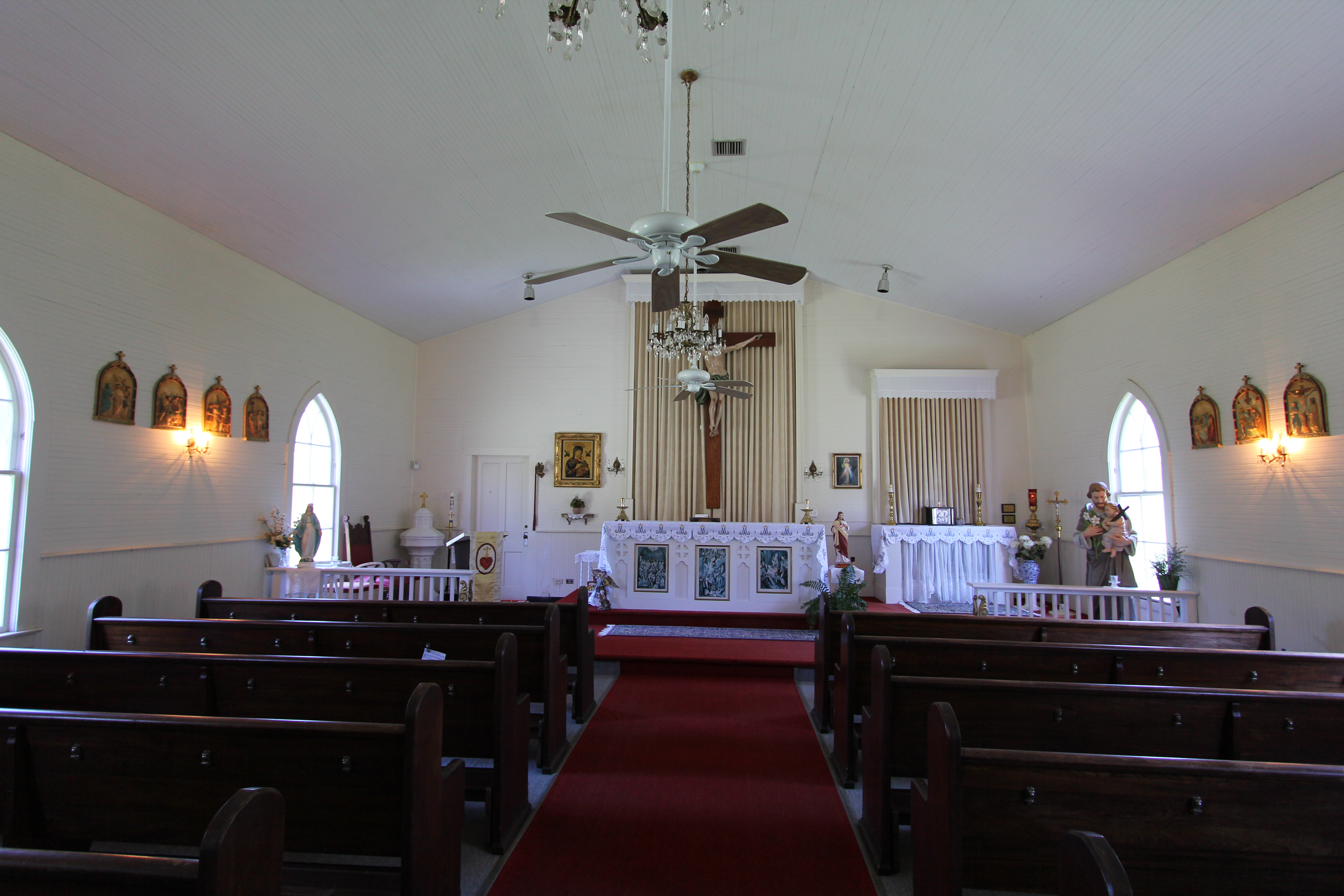
Interior Pulpit View

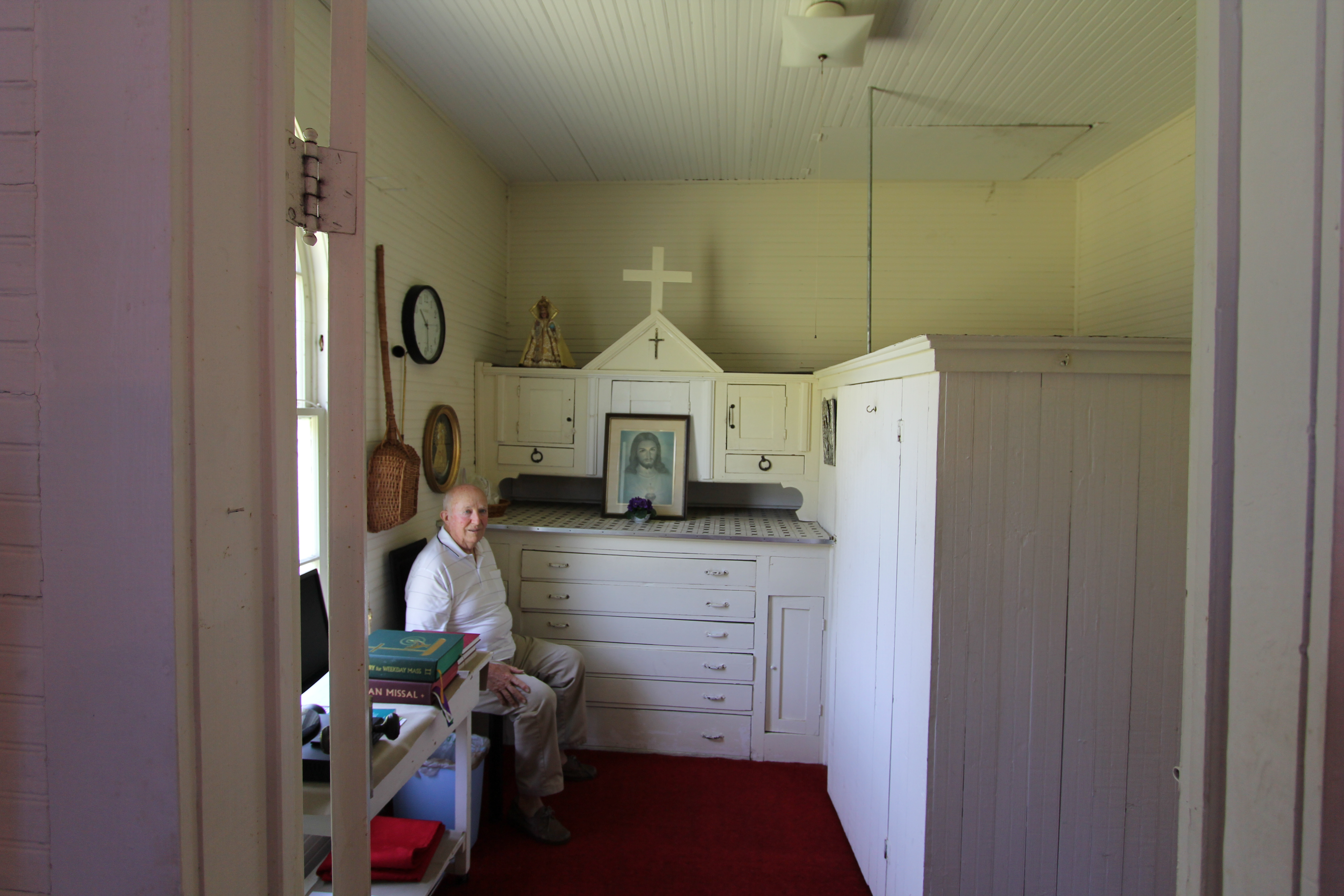
Original Storage Room

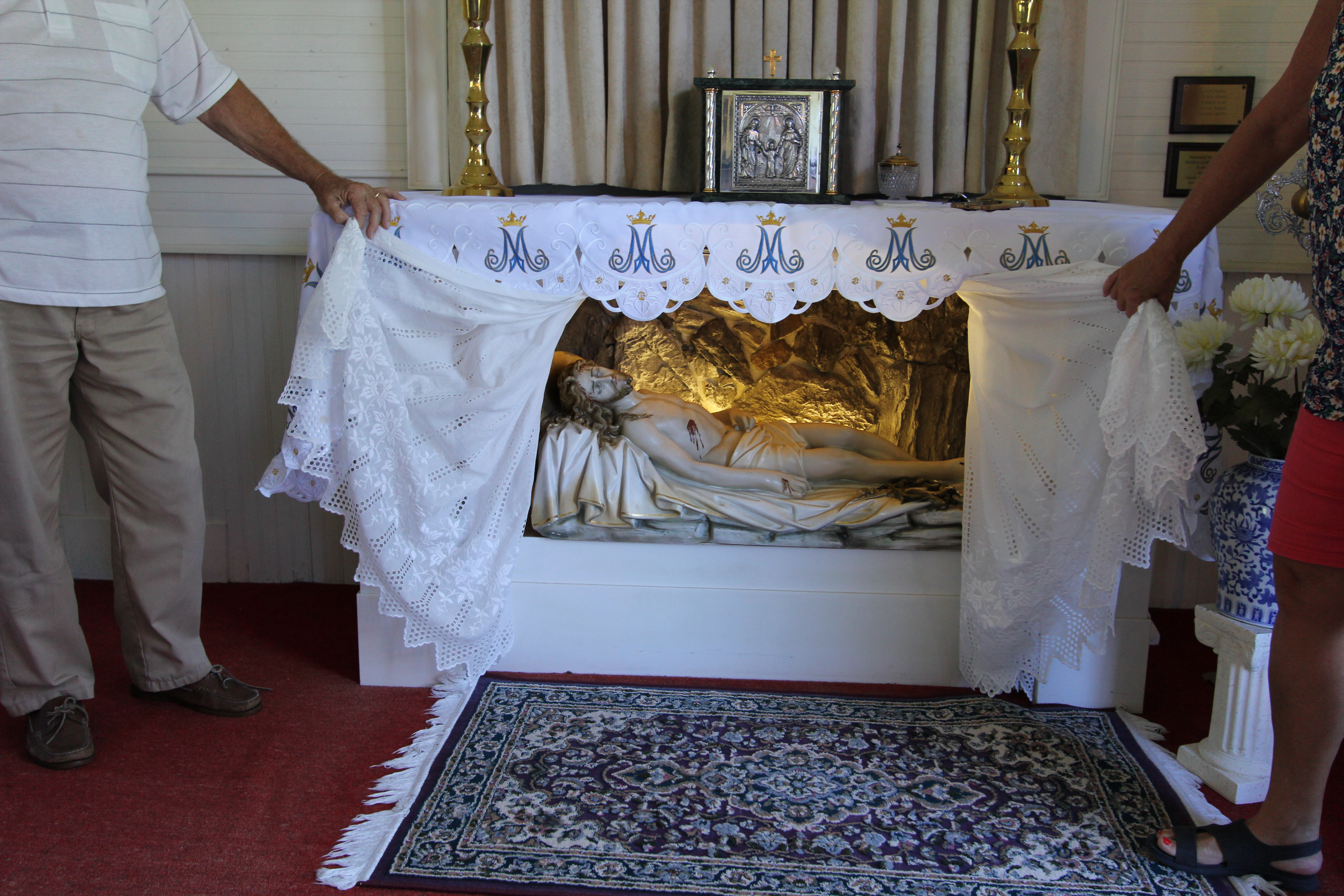
Statue of the Redeemer in Death

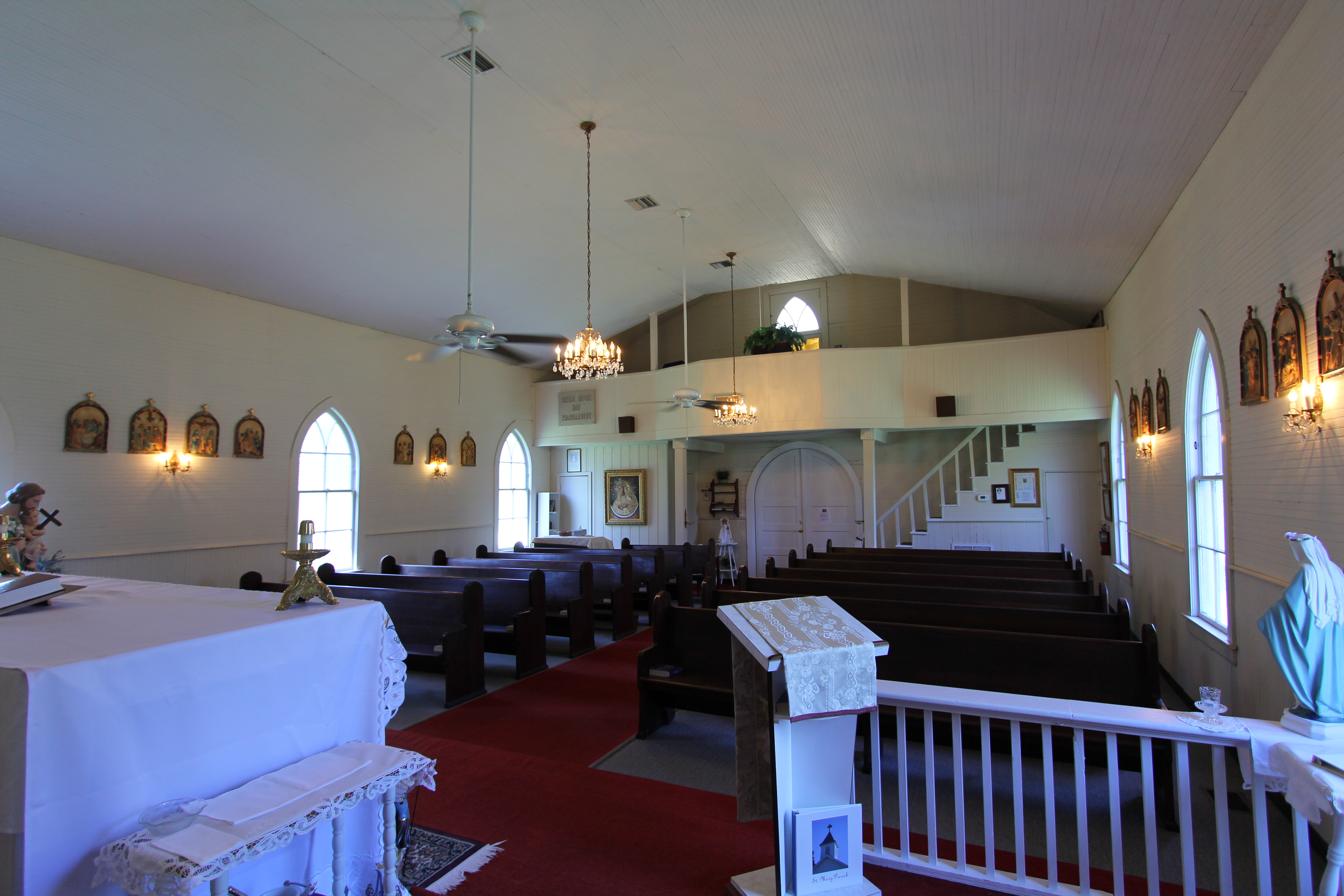
Pulpit to Front Entrance View

== Shrine of Saint Christopher ==
The Shrine of Saint Christopher, the patron saint of travelers, was built in 1935 by Rev. Fr. Cornelius Hoffman, a missionary who had studied theology in Poland. It is located on property to the left (north) side of the St. Mary Catholic Church. The Shrine's base measures 28 feet by 40 feet and is 24 feet high. The Shrine was a gift to Korona and is a rest stop for motorists who can visit the shrine and pray to the Patron Saint of Travelers. Since the 1960s, the St. Mary Catholic Church performs special services called the Blessing of Automobiles where motorists are invited to have their cars blessed in front of the Shrine of Saint Christopher. The shrine has an altar on its west side that includes the following inscription: “Let us invoke god’s blessing on our visitors as they journey on their way along ways of peace and prosperity. May the almighty and merciful god lead them and may the angel Raphael and St. Christopher accompany them on their journey. So they in peace, health, and joy, return unto their own.”

=== Shrine of Saint Christopher Picture Gallery ===
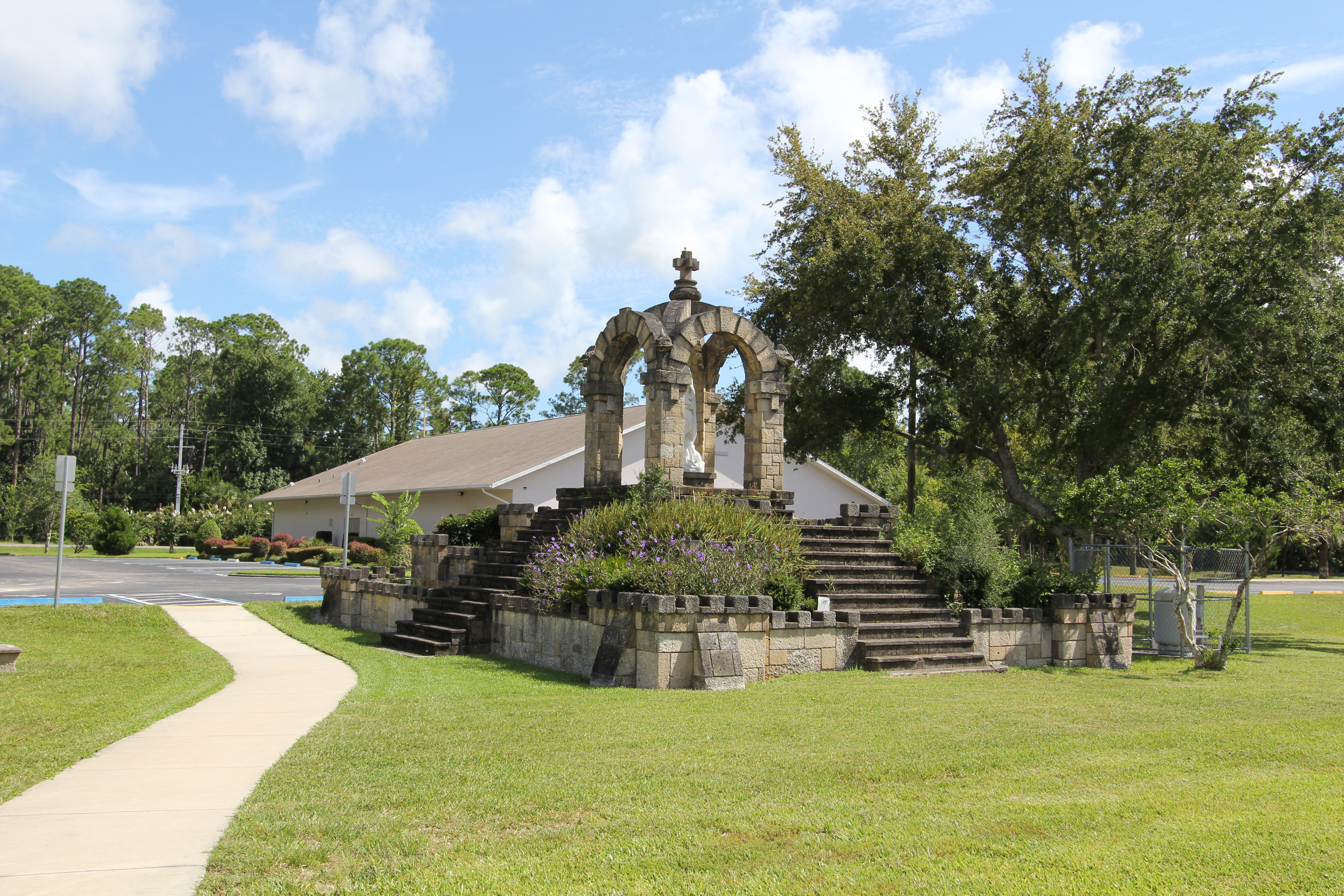
Southwest View

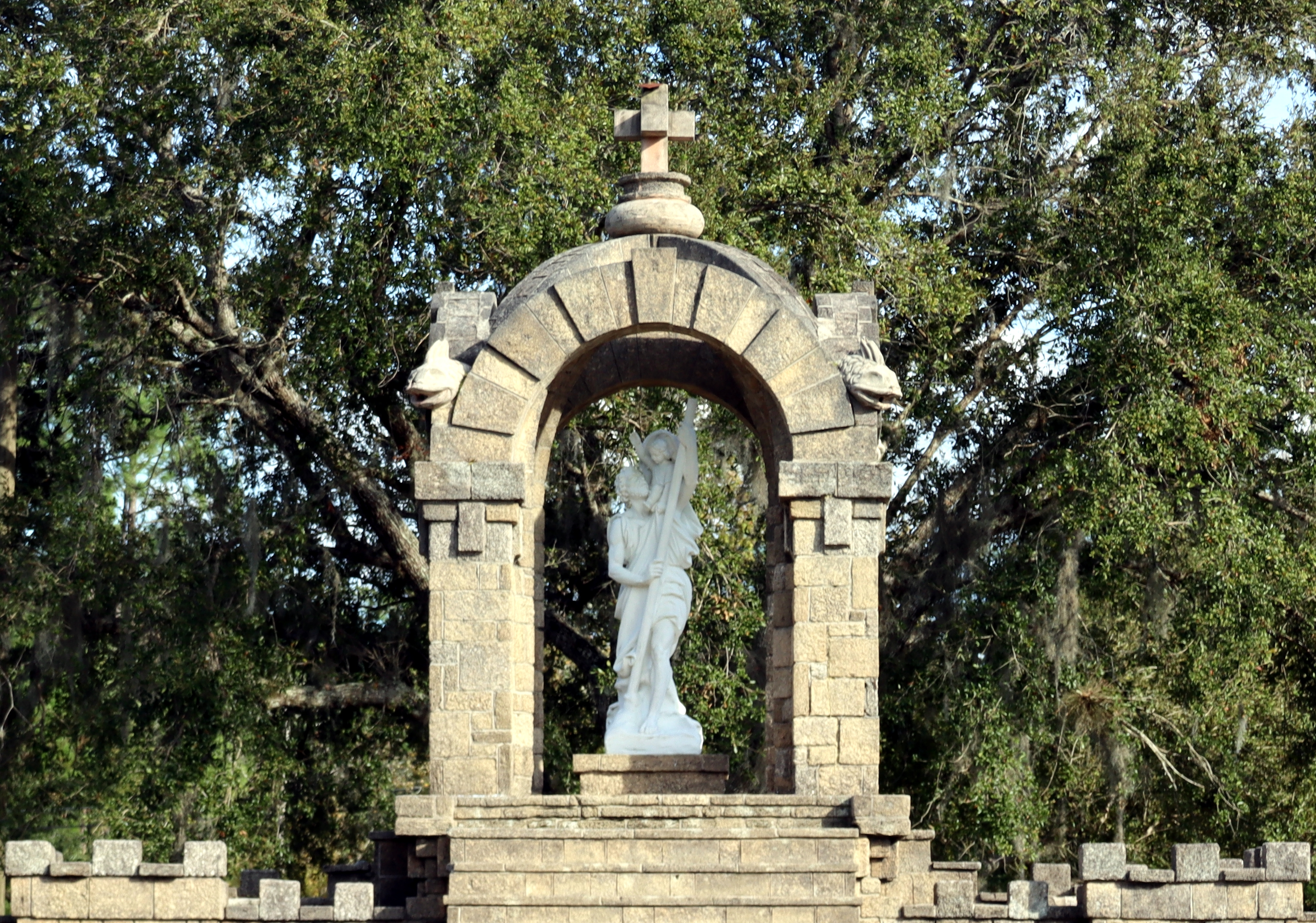
Statue View

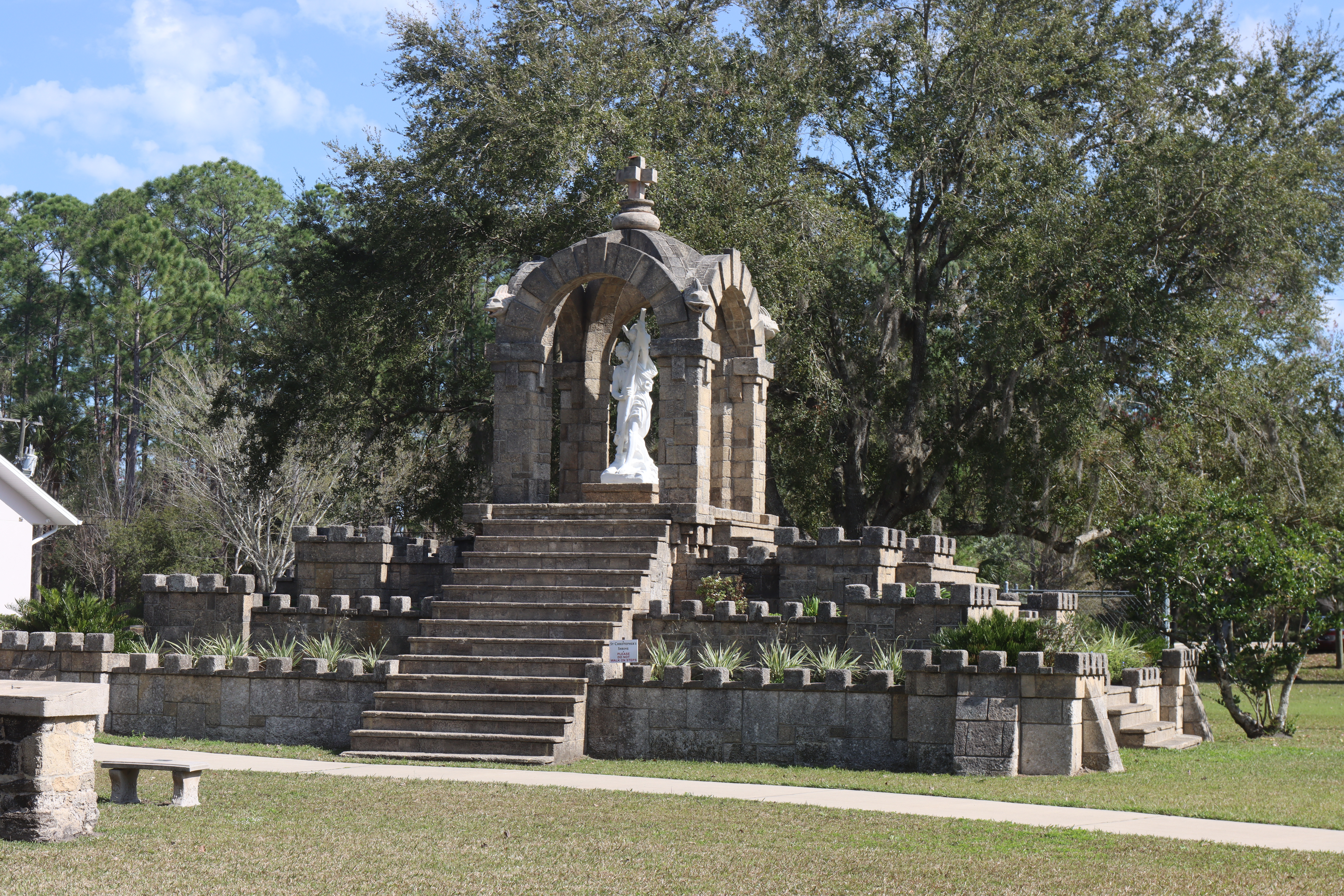
Southwest Close-up View

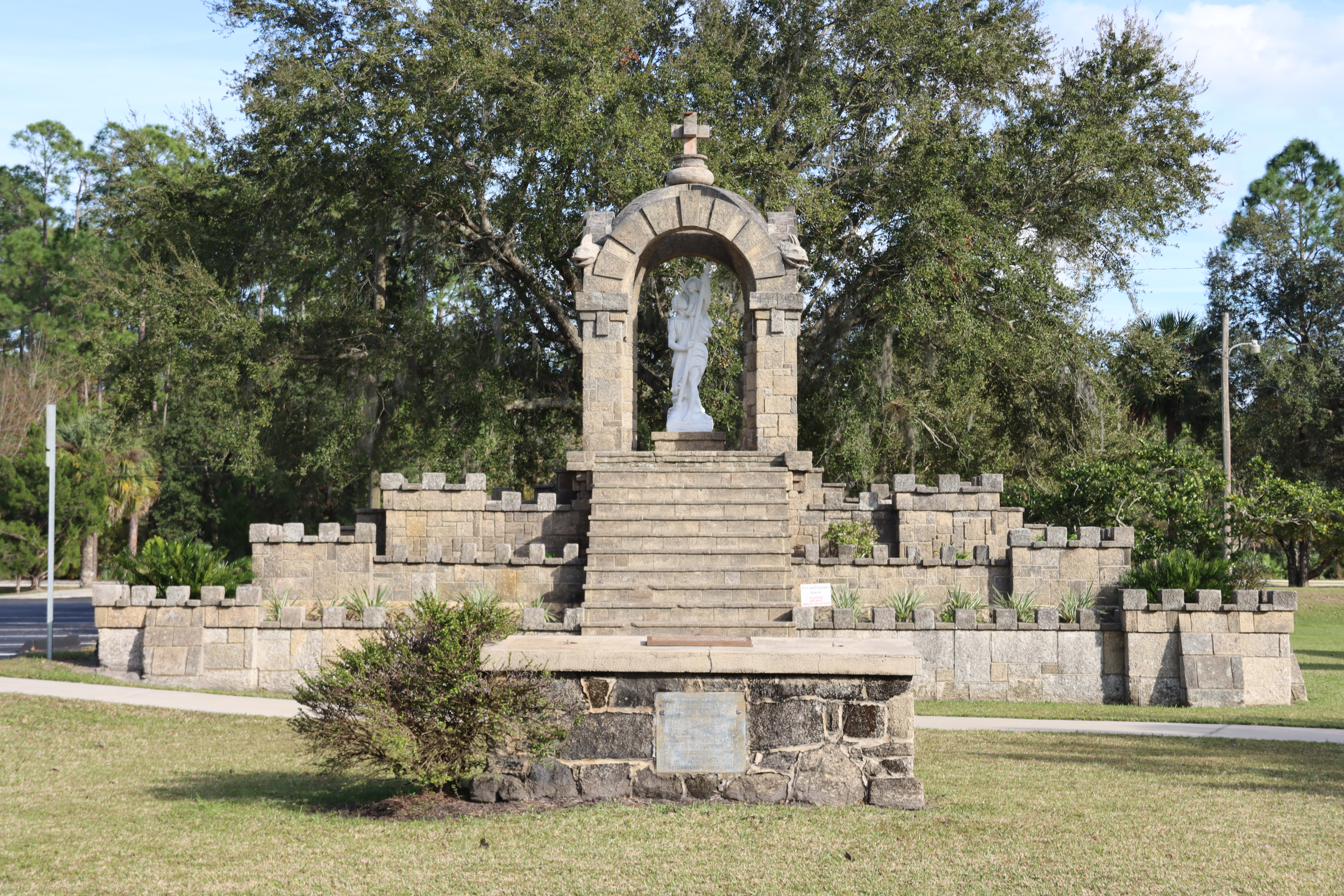
North View

== History of Korona, Florida ==
Rev. Michael Curley, bishop of St. Augustine, purchased land for $1.00 in the center of Korona and this was where a Catholic church building would be constructed. The church building was originally named St. Mary, Queen of Poland, Catholic Church, but later changed its name to St. Mary Catholic Church. This church immediately became the heart of the community and is still an important symbol of the community of Korona.

Upon arriving in Korona the Polish families began building homes and farms in addition to their church. Since 1955, Korona has been part of the Bunnell post office service area.

The area's rugged wilderness, which included dense woodlands, heavy soil, insects, poor drainage and lack of reliable road transportation, other than the railroad, led to crop failures and difficulty transporting harvests to shipping centers.

By 1922, automobile transportation was improved as the Dixie Highway reached Korona. And, by the 1930s, U.S. Highway 1 was running through Korona. These roads made traveling to and from Korona, by way of automobiles, much easier and allowed access to many more areas that were not serviced by the railroads.

In 1926, Barney Trojanowski built the White Eagle Hotel. The first floor of the hotel was used as a grocery and feed store as well as a real estate office. The second floor had the family and patron rooms. The building was used as a social and recreation facility, and included a beer garden (after the repeal of Prohibition in 1934) and large dance floor in addition to being a hotel for many years. Many festivals and special events, including St. Mary Catholic Church sponsored events, were hosted here. In 1959, the White Eagle Hotel building was demolished to make room for the widening to four lanes of the U.S. Highway.

In 1935, the Shrine of St. Christopher was built by Rev. Fr. Cornelius Hoffman, as a gift to Korona. Many community and church-related events have taken place at this shrine including the popular Blessing of the Automobiles. Since its construction, this shrine has brought many travelers to Korona, and is still a popular stop for motorists."

In 1940, infrastructure in Korona dramatically improved when electric service was connected to the area. Suddenly, the rural area of Korona had the means to improve its standard of living and expedite the modern development of the community.

As the Korona community continued to grow during the 20th century, the original St. Mary Catholic Church became too small for its parish. A new St. Mary Catholic Church was constructed and it was dedicated on October 8, 1994. This larger church can accommodate up to 500 people, including Polish-speaking parishioners who travel from communities many miles from Korona.

In 2011, a new Parish Center was constructed on the St. Mary Catholic Church property, which includes classrooms, offices and a social hall. In 2014, the St. Vincent DePaul Thrift was constructed on the St. Mary Catholic Church property, which provides affordable clothing and house wares to the needy of Korona and nearby communities.

== Listing on the National Register of Historic Places ==
The initial nomination was approved by the Florida National Register Review Board on November 2, 2023, and was then sent to the U.S. Department of the Interior, National Park Service for final approval by the Keeper of the National Register. On January 25, 2024, the St. Mary Catholic Church was officially listed on the National Register of Historic Places. The historical significance of the property is associated with the areas of architecture, ethnic heritage: European (Polish), and exploration/settlement. The St. Mary Catholic Church listing included the Shrine of Saint Christopher structure as a contributing resource.
