= 2022 GLAAD 20 Under 20 =

List recognizing young professionals

- Sponsored by: Teen Vogue; Delta Air Lines
- Date: September 28, 2022
- Website: glaad.org/20-under-20/2022/

The 2022 GLAAD 20 Under 20 was the third annual list released by GLAAD recognizing 20 LGBTQ+ individuals under the age of 20 for their contributions to promoting acceptance, visibility and equality through activism, media, advocacy, and arts.

The list was announced on 28 September 2022 in partnership with Teen Vogue and sponsored by Delta Air Lines, and highlighted the impact of young LGBTQ+ leaders across various fields.

== Honorees ==
This was the official honorees for the third annual list of the GLAAD 20 Under 20.

#	Name	Age	Pronouns	Profession
1	Aidan Kohn-Murphy	18	he/him	Activist & founder
2	Alex Consani	19	she/her	Supermodel & influencer
3	Ava Aimable	18	she/her	Student & activist
4	Cameron Samuels	18	they/them	Student & organizer
5	Danielle Cohn	18	she/her	Entrepreneur & influencer
6	Elva Guerra	18	they/them	Actor & activist
7	Eve May	14	she/her	Public speaker
8	Gabriella Pizzolo	19	she/they	Actor & writer
9	Giiwediin	20	Any pronouns	Water protector, student & TikToker
10	Jack Petocz	17	he/him	Activist, director & political strategist
11	Jade LeMac	18	she/her	Musician
12	Javier Gomez	18	he/him	Student, activist, writer & designer
13	Lotus Lloyd	19	he/him	Sex educator & student
14	Milly Shapiro	19	she/they	Actor & songwriter
15	Nico Craig	20	he/they	Activist & musician
16	Olivia Julianna	19	she/her	Activist & political strategist
17	Roswell Grey	17	they/them	Youth ambassador
18	Will Larkins	17	they/them	Student, activist & LGBTQ advocate
19	Zander Moricz	18	he/him	Executive director
20	Zuriel Hooks	19	she/her	Activist & youth ambassador
