= Petőcz =

Petocz or Petőcz is a surname. Notable people with the surname include:

- András Petőcz (born 1959), Hungarian writer and poet
- Jack Petocz (born 2004), American student activist
