= Zaya Wade =

American model and influencer

- Born: May 29, 2007 (age 19)
- Occupations: Activist; model; influencer
- Years active: 2020–present
- Father: Dwyane Wade
- Relatives: Zaire Wade (brother); Gabrielle Union (Stepmother)

Zaya Wade (born May 29, 2007) is an American activist, model and influencer. She is the daughter of former NBA player Dwyane Wade. She co-founded Translatable, a website for LGBTQ+ youth. She was included in the The Advocate's Women of Year list in 2020, The Root's Young Futurists list in 2020, and the GLAAD 20 Under 20 list in 2025.

== Early life ==
Zaya Wade was born on May 29, 2007 to former NBA player Dwyane Wade and Siohvaughn Funches. She is the younger sister of Zaire Wade and has three younger siblings. Due to her father's professional basketball career as a player of the Miami Heat, she primarily grew up in Miami, Florida during her childhood.

== Career ==
After coming out as trans in 2020 at age 12, she started a career in runway modeling, making her runway debut for Miu Miu at Paris Fashion Week in March 2023. She has appeared on the cover of Dazed magazine, and in high fashion campaigns for brands like Tiffany & Co. and Dove. She was in Puma's 2023 "FOREVER. CLASSIC." campaign, modeling footwear and designing her own custom pair of shoes.

== Advocacy ==
Wade is an activist for trans visibility. In 2020, she was featured in both The Advocate's Women of the Year list, and The Root's Young Futurists list. In May 2024, she partnered with her father Dwyane Wade to launch "Translatable," a digital platform providing a safe community space for LGBTQ+ youth. In December 2025, she was included in the sixth annual list of GLAAD 20 Under 20 presented by Teen Vogue.
