= 2024 California's 45th congressional district election =

- November 5, 2024
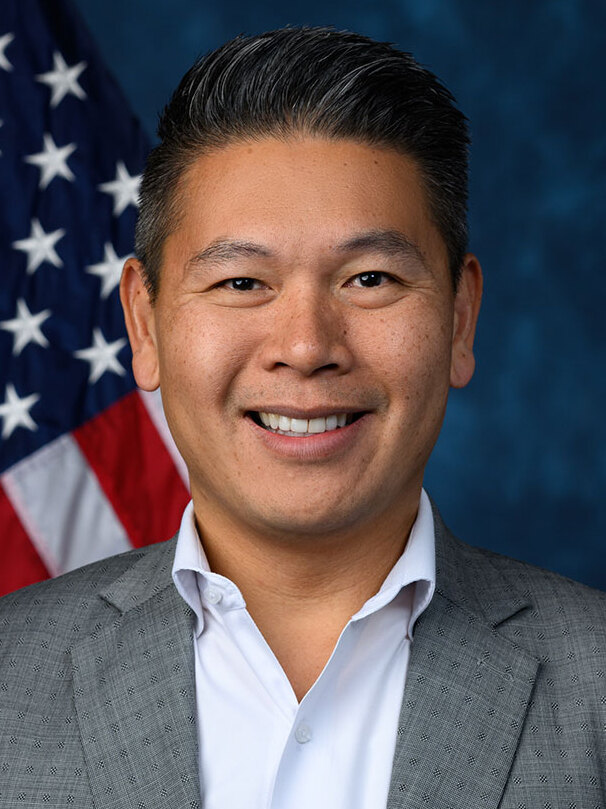

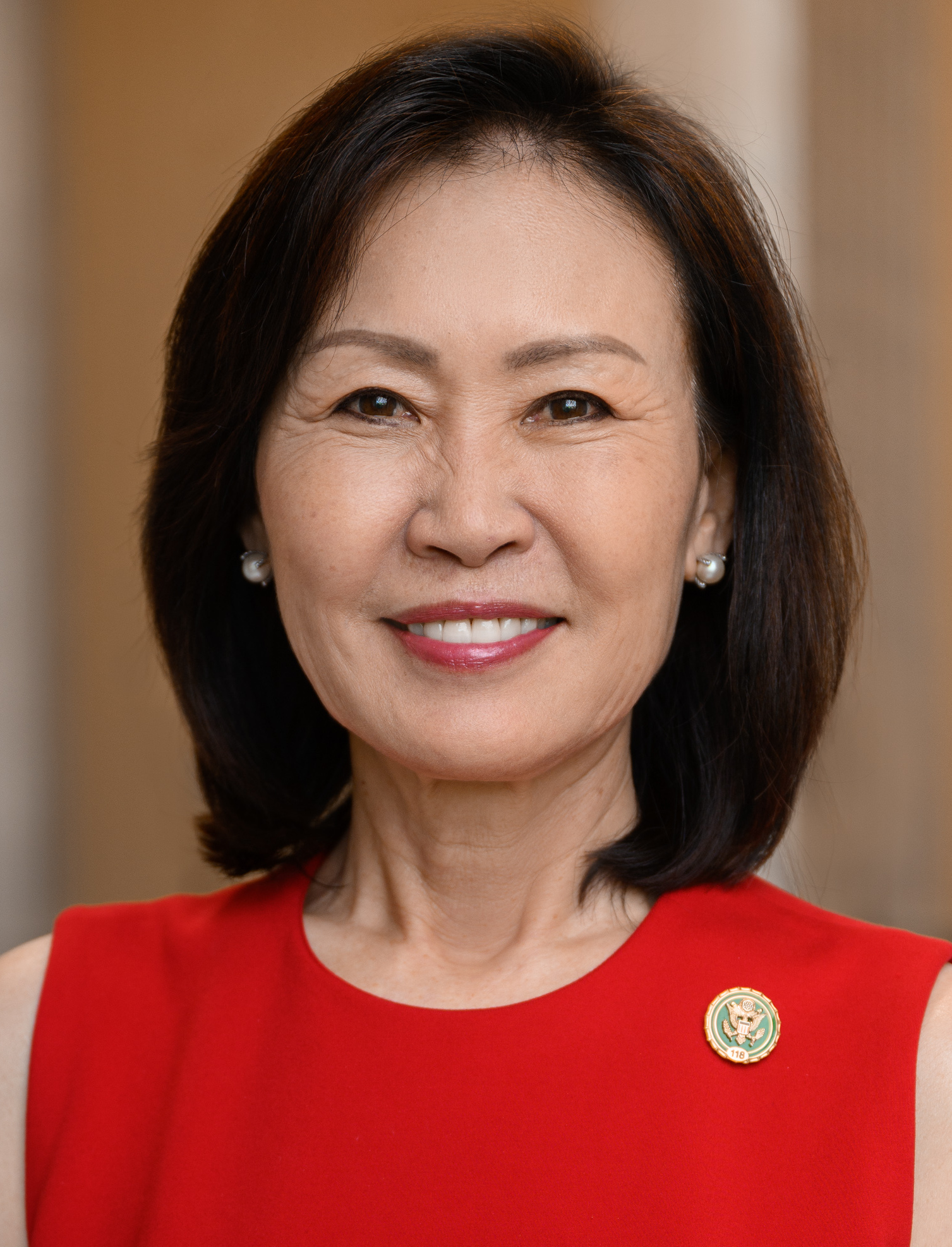
Candidate	Derek Tran	Michelle Steel
Party	Democratic	Republican
Popular vote	158,264	157,611
Percentage	50.1%	49.9%
- County results Tran: 50–60% Steel: 50–60%
U.S. Representative before election
Michelle Steel
Republican
Elected U.S. Representative
Derek Tran
Democratic

The 2024 California's 45th congressional district election was held on November 5, 2024, to elect the United States representative for California's 45th congressional district, concurrently with elections for the other U.S. House districts in California and the rest of the country, as well as the 2024 U.S. Senate race in California, other elections to the United States Senate, and various state and local elections. The primary election was held on March 5, 2024, concurrently with the Super Tuesday presidential primaries. The election was won by Democratic challenger Derek Tran who narrowly unseated Republican incumbent Michelle Steel by just 0.2%, and the race was one of the closest of the election cycle. Major news outlets only called the race 22 days after election night.

Based in Orange County and Los Angeles County, the 45th district contains all of Fountain Valley, Westminster, Garden Grove, Cypress, Buena Park, Cerritos, Artesia, La Palma, Placentia, Hawaiian Gardens, Los Alamitos, and Rossmoor, as well as portions of Brea, Lakewood, Fullerton, and Yorba Linda. One-third of all registered voters in the district are Asian American, with Vietnamese Americans alone comprising 16% of the district's voters.

The incumbent was Republican Michelle Steel, who was re-elected with 52.4% of the vote in 2022. Steel, who is Korean American, was first elected in 2020, unseating incumbent Democrat Harley Rouda. She previously served as a member of the Orange County Board of Supervisors and the California State Board of Equalization.

The race was expected to be highly competitive as it is a purple suburban district. Both House Democrats and House Republicans listed California's 45th district among their highest-priority districts in the 2024 election. Joe Biden carried this district by a 6% margin in the 2020 presidential election. Steel was one of 17 House Republicans representing a Biden-won district. At the local level, however, the 45th district has trended Republican, voting for Republicans in every state race in 2022.

== Primary election ==
At the end of 2023, Tran announced that he would enter the primary in a bid to become the party's nominee for the U.S. Representative seat in California's 45th congressional district. In March, Tran secured his position as the Democratic nominee, beating another candidate, Kim Nguyen-Penaloza, by 366 votes to face incumbent Republican Steel.

=== Candidates ===
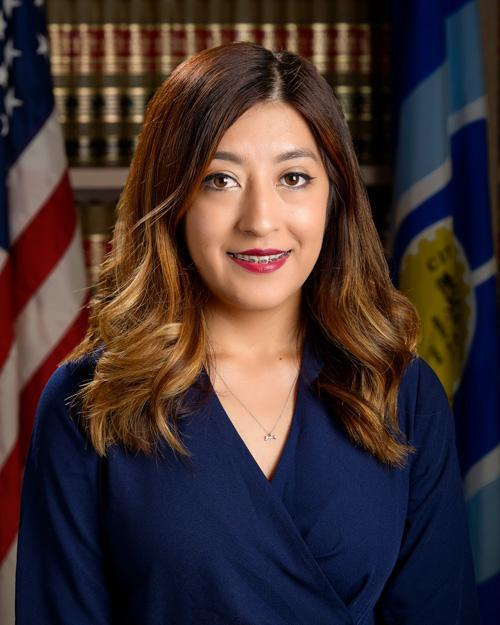
Kim Nguyen-Penaloza

==== Advanced to general ====
- Michelle Steel (Republican), incumbent U.S. representative
- Derek Tran (Democratic), Consumer Attorneys of California board member

==== Eliminated in primary ====
- Cheyenne Hunt (Democratic), attorney and TikTok influencer
- Kim Nguyen-Penaloza (Democratic), Garden Grove city councilor and runner-up for Orange County Board of Supervisors District 2 in 2022
- Aditya Pai (Democratic), attorney

==== Withdrawn ====
- Jimmy Pham (Democratic), member of the Westminster Traffic Commission (endorsed Nguyen-Penaloza, ran for state assembly)

==== Declined ====
- Mike Schaefer (Democratic), member of the California State Board of Equalization from the 4th district (2019–present) (ran for U.S. Senate in Nevada)

=== Endorsements ===
Cheyenne Hunt (D)

Individuals

- Howie Klein, former president of Reprise Records (1989–2001) and adjunct professor at McGill University
- Heather Digby Parton, political blogger

Organizations

- Patriotic Millionaires
Kim Nguyen-Penaloza (D)

U.S. representatives

- Lou Correa, CA-46 (2017–present)
- Sara Jacobs, CA-51 (2021–present)
- Grace Meng, NY-6 (2013–present)
- Katie Porter, CA-47 (2019–present)
- Linda Sánchez, CA-38 (2003–present)
- Jill Tokuda, HI-2 (2023–present)

State senators

- Monique Limón, state senator from the 19th district (2020–present)
- Tom Umberg, state senator from the 34th district (2018–present)

State assemblymembers

- Tom Daly, former state assemblyman from the 69th district (2012–2022) and former mayor of Anaheim (1992–2002)
- Josh Lowenthal, state assemblyman from the 69th district (2022–present)
- Cottie Petrie-Norris, state assemblywoman from the 73rd district (2018–present)
- Sharon Quirk-Silva, state assemblywoman from the 65th district (2012–2014, 2016–present)
- Avelino Valencia, state assemblyman from the 68th district (2022–present)

Municipal officials

- Katrina Foley, Orange County supervisor from the 5th district (2021–present)

Local officials

- Farrah Khan, mayor of Irvine (2020–present)
- Jimmy Pham, member of the Westminster Traffic Commission (2022–present) and former candidate for this seat in 2024
- 6 other local officials

Individuals

- Maria Cardona, political strategist

Party chapters

- California Democratic Party
- Los Angeles County Democratic Party

Labor unions

- American Federation of Government Employees Local 675 and TSA Local 1260
- American Federation of Teachers and California Federation of Teachers
- California Labor Federation and Orange County Labor Federation
- California Teachers Association
- Communication Workers of America Local 9150
- IBEW Local 11
- International Brotherhood of Teamsters District Council 42
- International Longshore and Warehouse Union Southern California District Council
- International Union of Painters and Allied Trades District Council 36
- Laborers' International Union of North America
- Los Angeles/Orange County Building and Construction Trades Council
- National Education Association
- National Union of Healthcare Workers
- Orange County Employees Association
- Service Employees International Union - California and United Service Workers West
- UNITE HERE Local 11
- United Association Local 250
- United Food and Commercial Workers Local 324
- United Steelworkers Local 675
- Western States Regional Council of Carpenters

Newspapers and other media

- Los Angeles Times

Organizations

- ASPIRE PAC
- California and Orange County Young Democrats
- CHC Bold PAC
- College Democrats of California State University, Fullerton
- Equality California
- Latino Victory
- National Women's Political Caucus
- PODER PAC
Michelle Steel (R)

U.S. representatives

- Elise Stefanik, U.S. representative from New York's 21st congressional district (2015–present) and chair of the House Republican Conference (2021–present)

Municipal officials

- Andrew Do, Orange County Supervisor from the 1st district (2015–present)

Local officials

- Carl DeMaio, former San Diego city councilor (2008–2012)

Organizations

- American Israel Public Affairs Committee (AIPAC)
- California College Republicans
- California ProLife Council
- California Rifle and Pistol Association
- Howard Jarvis Taxpayers Association PAC
- International Franchise Association
- Maggie's List
- National Rifle Association Political Victory Fund
- Pro-Israel America
- Republican Jewish Coalition

Party chapters

- California Republican Party
- Orange County Republican Party
Derek Tran (D)

U.S. representatives

- Judy Chu, CA-28 (2009–present)
- Zoe Lofgren, CA-18 (1995–present)
- Grace Meng, U.S. representative from NY-9 (2013–present)
- Seth Moulton, U.S. representative from Massachusetts's 6th congressional district (2015–present)
- Mark Takano, CA-39 (2013–present)

Municipal officials

- Vicente Sarmiento, Orange County supervisor from the 2nd district (2023–present)

Organizations

- AAPI Victory Fund
- ASPIRE PAC
- NewDem Action Fund
- VoteVets

=== Fundraising ===
Campaign finance reports as of October 30, 2024
Candidate	Raised	Spent	Cash on hand
Michelle Steel (R)	$8,971,455 (Note: $1,910,000 of this total was self-funded by Steel)	$5,675,115	$3,752,876
Cheyenne Hunt (D)	$389,534 (Note: $107,000 of this total was self-funded by Hunt)	$254,544	$134,990
Kim Nguyen-Penaloza (D)	$359,909	$357,405	$2,503
Aditya Pai (D)	$304,926 (Note: $33,833 of this total was self-funded by Pai)	$276,752	$10,396
Derek Tran (D)	$4,380,401	$3,423,836	$956,564
Source: Federal Election Commission

=== Polling ===
Poll source	Date(s) administered	Sample size (Note: Key: A – all adults RV – registered voters LV – likely voters V – unclear)	Margin of error	Cheyenne Hunt (D)	Kim Nguyen- Penaloza (D)	Aditya Pai (D)	Michelle Steel (R)	Derek Tran (D)	Other	Undecided
RMG Research (Note: Poll sponsored by U.S. Term Limits)	November 14–19, 2023	300 (LV)	± 5.7%	4%	10%	1%	28%	–	9% (Note: "Someone else" with 8%; "Would not vote" with 1%)	47%
Tulchin Research (Note: Poll sponsored by Tran's campaign)	November 13–19, 2023	500 (LV)	± 4.9%	6%	10%	2%	39%	11%	–	32%

=== Results ===
Results by county and municipality Steel: 40–50%; 50–60%; No votes / no data

2024 California's 45th congressional district primary
Party	Candidate	Votes	%
Republican	Michelle Steel (incumbent)	78,020	54.9
Democratic	Derek Tran	22,544	15.9
Democratic	Kim Nguyen-Penaloza	22,178	15.6
Democratic	Cheyenne Hunt	11,971	8.4
Democratic	Aditya Pai	7,398	5.2
Total votes		142,111	100.0

== General election ==
After the March primary, Democrat Tran would face incumbent Michelle Steel, a Republican running for a third term. The district is considered a "battleground district" insofar as it was won by Joe Biden in 2020 but has its seat occupied by a member of the Republican Party. Tran's campaign has emphasized the centrality of his Vietnamese American identity to his bid, as the district encompasses parts of Los Angeles County and Orange County and is considered a majority-minority district, including cities Westminster and Garden Grove, which have predominantly Vietnamese American communities, as well as Artesia and Cerritos where Asian Americans are the largest demographic by race. ABC 7 reported that the district was 39% Asian.

Both Steel and Tran vied for support from the district's Vietnamese community, with Steel claiming she understood and worked with the Vietnamese community in the district much better than Tran provoking Tran to respond that the claim was "insulting and disgraceful." The Asian American Action Fund subsequently condemned Steel's comments. In August 2024, the New York Post called out Tran for bringing a translator with him to interviews and events, questioning whether he was actually fluent in Vietnamese. Steel's campaign additionally used Tran's false claims of proficiency as a point of criticism. At the end of August, Tran admitted to the Los Angeles Times that he had lost his childhood fluency and has since spoken "broken Vietnamese." However, Tran's campaign additionally provided a series of video clips in which Tran spoke Vietnamese on television.

The candidates exchanged accusations of communist sympathies. Tran accused Steel's husband, Shawn, of accepting bribes from the Chinese Communist Party in exchange for information, stating that Steel thus could not be trusted with political office in the United States. He also drew distinctions between his own family background to that of Steel's, stating that Steel immigrated to the United States for "economic gain" while his family were refugees fleeing communism. Several Asian American leaders and organizations subsequently condemned the comment. Later, on October 22, 2024, the Los Angeles Times reported that Steel's campaign was sending out campaign mailers associating Tran with Mao Zedong and accusing him of supporting socialism. Following Tran's disclosure in August that he held cryptocurrencies, Steel also claimed that his cryptocurrency assets were bound up in China. Steel defended her accusation asserting it was provoked by Tran's earlier messaging. The mutual accusations caused several Asian American nonprofits to pen a letter to both parties stating that such rhetoric should not be used in the race.

In October, Hakeem Jeffries stumped for Tran at a party event in Anaheim, stating that the race would be close. Bill Clinton also appeared in Orange County to stump for Tran as well as Dave Min, a state senator in a similarly tight race.

Tran went on to win the general election in one of the tightest battles in the 2024 cycle.

=== Predictions ===
Source	Ranking	As of
Cook Political Report	Tossup	September 6, 2024
Inside Elections	Tossup	October 18, 2024
Sabato's Crystal Ball	Lean R	November 4, 2024
Elections Daily	Lean R	November 4, 2024
CNalysis	Tilt D (flip)	November 4, 2024

=== Polling ===
Poll source	Date(s) administered	Sample size	Margin of error	Michelle Steel (R)	Derek Tran (D)	Undecided
Normington Petts (D) (Note: Poll sponsored by the Democratic Congressional Campaign Committee)	October 13–15, 2024	400 (V)	± 4.4%	45%	48%	7%
American Viewpoint (R) (Note: Poll sponsored by Steel's campaign and the NRCC)	October 8–10, 2024	400 (V)	± 4.9%	45%	41%	14%
USC/CSU	September 14–21, 2024	498 (LV)	± 4.4%	46%	48%	5%
Tulchin Research (D)	September 14–19, 2024	600 (LV)	± 4.0%	45%	47%	8%
Normington Petts (D)	July 29–31, 2024	500 (LV)	± 4.4%	47%	47%	6%
Tulchin Research	May 23 – June 2, 2024	600 (LV)	± 4.0%	42%	41%	17%

=== Post-primary endorsements ===
Michelle Steel (R)

Newspapers

- Orange County Register

Organizations

- Log Cabin Republicans PAC
Derek Tran (D)

Executive branch Officials

- Bill Clinton, 42nd president of the United States (1993–2001)
- Robert Reich, former U.S. Secretary of Labor (1993–1997)

U.S. representatives

- Hakeem Jeffries, House Minority Leader (2023–present) from NY-08 (2013–present)

Newspapers

- Los Angeles Times

Organizations

- Asian American Action Fund
- DCCC Red to Blue
- Democratic Majority for Israel
- End Citizens United
- Everytown for Gun Safety
- Jewish Democratic Council of America
- Reproductive Freedom for All

=== Results ===
2024 California's 45th congressional district election
Party	Candidate	Votes	%	±%
Democratic	Derek Tran	158,264	50.10%	+2.51
Republican	Michelle Steel (incumbent)	157,611	49.90%	−2.51
Total votes		315,875	100.00%	N/A
Democratic gain from Republican				

==== By county ====
County	Michelle Steel Republican		Derek Tran Democratic		Margin		Total votes cast
County	#	%	#	%	#	%	Total votes cast
Los Angeles (part)	14,840	43.77%	19,066	56.23%	4,226	12.46%	33,906
Orange (part)	142,771	50.63%	139,198	49.37%	−3,573	−1.27%	281,969
Totals	157,611	49.90%	158,264	50.10%	653	0.21%	315,875

== Notes ==
Partisan clients
