= Aidan Murphy (disambiguation) =

Aidan Murphy (born 2003) is an Australian sprinter.

Aidan Murphy may also refer to:

- Aidan Murphy (footballer) (born 1967), English footballer
- Aidan Gillen (Aidan Murphy, born 1968), Irish actor
- Aidan Kohn-Murphy (born 2004), American social media content creator and political activist
