= 2020 GLAAD 20 Under 20 =

List recognizing young professionals

- Sponsored by: Teen Vogue; Google; UGG; Shutterfly
- Date: June 22, 2020
- Website: glaad.org/20-under-20/2020/

The 2020 GLAAD 20 Under 20 was the first annual list released by GLAAD recognizing 20 LGBTQ+ individuals under the age of 20 for their contributions to promoting acceptance, visibility and equality through activism, media, advocacy, and arts.

The list was announced on 22 June 2020 in partnership with Teen Vogue and highlighted the impact of young LGBTQ+ leaders across various fields.

== Honorees ==
This was the official honorees for the fist annual list of the GLAAD 20 Under 20.

#	Name	Age	Pronouns	Profession
1	Aaron Philip	19	she/her	Model
2	Alex Escaja	20	he/they	Advocate & filmmaker
3	Emma González	20	she/her	Activist
4	Ezra Greyson Wheeler	20	they/them	Student
5	Ian Alexander	19	he/him	Actor
6	Jamie Margolin	18	she/her	Activist & author
7	Jazz Jennings	19	she/her	Activist, TV personality & author
8	Joshua Rush	18	he/him	Actor & political advocate
9	Josie Totah	18	she/her	Actress
10	Kidd Kenn	17	he/him	Artist
11	Lachlan Watson	19	they/them	Artist
12	Leo Rocha	20	he/him	Producer
13	Logan Rozos	19	he/him	Actor
14	Map Pesqueira	20	he/they	Activist
15	Ose Arheghan	19	they/them	Policy organizer
16	Sage Dolan-Sandrino	19	she/her	Creative
17	Sameer Jha	18	they/them	Activist
18	Sarah Rose Huckman	19	she/her	Athlete
19	Shannon Li	19	she/they	Student
20	Zoey Luna	18	she/her	Actress
