= Terence Steward =

American football player (born 1965)

No. 83
- Position: Wide receiver

Personal information
- Born: April 10, 1965 (age 61); Bunnell, Florida, U.S.
- Listed height: 5 ft 9 in (1.75 m)
- Listed weight: 161 lb (73 kg)

Career information
- High school: Flagler Palm Coast (FL)
- College: Lenoir–Rhyne (1983–1986)
- NFL draft: 1987: undrafted

Career history
- Dallas Cowboys (1987)

Awards and highlights
- 3× All-SAC (1984, 1985, 1986); 3× NAIA All-American (1984, 1985, 1986)

Terence Steward (born April 10, 1965) is an American former football wide receiver in the National Football League for the Dallas Cowboys. He played college football at Lenoir–Rhyne University.

== Early life ==
Steward attended Flagler Palm Coast High School. As a junior, he was the starting quarterback and received All-conference honors. As a senior, he received All-conference and All-state honors.

== College career ==
He accepted a football scholarship from Lenoir-Rhyne College. As a freshman, he was converted into a wide receiver and was named a starter, collecting 29 receptions for 434 yards.

As a sophomore in 1984, he led the NAIA with 1,040 receiving yards, while also making 65 catches. He had 8 receptions for 179 yards against Guilford College. As a junior in 1985, he posted 75 receptions for 1,052 yards.

As a senior in 1986, he broke his own school single-season record, registering 78 receptions for 1,105 receiving yards. He set a Conference and school single-game records with 18 receptions for 266 yards against Mars Hill College. He also made 9 receptions for 180 yards against Davidson College.

At the time, he finished his college career with 247 receptions (school record and 3rd in NAIA history), 3,631 receiving yards (school record and 1st in NAIA history) and 18 receiving touchdowns (second in school history).

In 1998, he was inducted into the Lenoir-Rhyne Sports Hall of Fame. In 2001, he was inducted into the South Atlantic Conference Hall of Fame.

== Professional career ==
Steward was signed as an undrafted free agent by the Dallas Cowboys after the 1987 NFL draft on April 29. He was waived on August 31.

After the NFLPA strike was declared on the third week of the 1987 season, Steward was re-signed to be a part of the Dallas Cowboys replacement team. He was a third-string wide receiver in the first 2 replacement games. He suffered a knee injury while practicing for the third game and chose to rehabilitate instead of surgery. In October, he was placed on the injured reserve list and was not re-signed at the end of the season.
