= Frank Barger =

American football coach

Frank Barger (1921 in China Grove, North Carolina – 1991) was an American high school football coach at Hickory High School in Hickory, North Carolina. A graduate of Lenoir-Rhyne College, Barger compiled a 273–108–5 record in coaching the Hickory Tornadoes. This includes 3 western state titles and 10 district titles during his 31-year tenure (1953–1984). He was the National Coach of the Year for District 3 (Southeast U.S.) in 1971, and in 1993 was inducted into the North Carolina Sports Hall of Fame, in Raleigh, North Carolina. During his time at Hickory High School, Barger also coached other sports such as baseball, golf, track, and girls' basketball.
