= 2023 GLAAD 20 Under 20 =

List recognizing young professionals

- Sponsored by: Teen Vogue; Hyundai; M&M's; Live Nation; The Recording Academy
- Date: September 26, 2023
- Website: glaad.org/20-under-20/2023/

The 2023 GLAAD 20 Under 20 was the fourth annual list released by GLAAD recognizing 20 LGBTQ+ individuals under the age of 20 for their contributions to promoting acceptance, visibility and equality through activism, media, advocacy, and arts.

The list was announced on 26 September 2023 in partnership with Teen Vogue and sponsored by Hyundai, M&M's, Live Nation and The Recording Academy, and highlighted the impact of young LGBTQ+ leaders across various fields.

== Honorees ==
This was the official honorees for the fourth annual list of the GLAAD 20 Under 20.

#	Name	Age	Pronouns	Profession
1	Brooklynne Webb	19	she/her	Content creator & singer
2	CJ King	19	he/him	Model & designer
3	Dylan Brandt	17	he/him	Activist
4	Evann McIntosh	19	they/them	Singer & songwriter
5	Harleigh Walker	16	she/her	Activist
6	Isaac Dunbar	20	he/him	Singer & songwriter
7	Isabella Fallahi	20	she/her	Activist
8	Jaiden Blancaflor	20	he/him	Student & advocate
9	Jameson Lee Johnson (Ophelia Peaches)	18	he/they	Performer & speaker
10	Lauren Scruggs	20	she/her	College athlete
11	Lee Gordon	19	she/they	Racial justice organizer
12	Lucía Umeki-Martínez	19	she/they/he	Reporter
13	Luke Islam	16	he/they	Singer & actor
14	Noah Schnapp	18	he/him	Actor
15	Rebekah Bruesehoff	16	she/her	Activist, author & athlete
16	Reuben de Maid	19	he/him	Makeup artist & influencer
17	Rosie Couture	20	she/her	Activist & organizer
18	Trans Youth Prom Organizers	–	–	Organizers
19	Xavier Logan	20	he/they	Dancer, choreography, model & student
20	Zachary Willmore	20	he/him	Content creator
