= Jade LeMac =

Canadian singer and songwriter

- Born: Jade MacPhail; March 4, 2004 (age 22)
- Origin: Victoria, Canada
- Genre: Indie pop
- Occupations: Singer; songwriter
- Instruments: Vocals; piano; guitar
- Years active: 2021–present
- Labels: Monstercat; Arista
- Website: www.jadelemac.com

Jade MacPhail, known professionally as Jade LeMac, is a Canadian singer and songwriter. A self-taught piano and guitar player, LeMac has gained popularity on both TikTok and Spotify, later releasing multiple albums and singles on Arista Records.

== Early life ==
Jade LeMac hails from Vancouver, British Columbia. She recounts growing up with a very musical family: "No one was playing any instruments, but we were vocally, very musical at the same time, I was always surrounded by it." She also sang outside her mother's store, trying to attract new customers to come in. LeMac started writing her own songs by the time she was in middle school.

At age 14, LeMac provided vocals for multiple dance singles produced by the electronic label Monstercat.

== Career ==
LeMac released her debut single "Constellations" in August 2021, which went viral on Spotify, accumulating over 1 million streams within the first month.

In 2023, LeMac signed with Arista Records. She also released her first EP, Constellations, named after her first single. Xtra Magazine called the album the "perfect introduction to this young singer-songwriter whose creations feel authentic and not bound by trend or genre". LeMac released her second album, Confessions, in late 2023. "Car Accident", a single off the album, has been called a "testament to the artist's creative skill".

LeMac posts about being part the LGBTQ+ community, citing her own popularity on TikTok. She has been out since age 12.

In January 2026, "Constellations" was certified Gold in France.

== Awards and honors ==
In 2022, LeMac was featured on the 2022 GLAAD 20 Under 20 list of "Outstanding Young LGBTQ Changemakers" In 2024, LeMac was nominated for GLAAD's Outstanding Breakthrough Music Artist award

She received a Juno Award nomination for Breakthrough Artist or Group of the Year at the Juno Awards of 2026.

== Discography ==
=== Albums ===
- Constellations (2022)
- Confessions (Deluxe Version) (2023)

=== EPs ===
- Confessions (2023)
- Confessions (Stripped) (2023)
- It's Always at Night (2025)

=== Singles ===
- "Constellations" (2021) – UK No. 47
- "Let Me" (2021)
- "Same Place" (2022)
- "Meet You in Hell" (2022)
- "Car Accident (Chill Version)" (2023)
- "Got Me Obsessed" (2023)
- "Narcissistic" (2024)
- "Pink Balloon" (2024)
- "Running Home" (2025) – CAN No. 82
- "Sleeping with the Lights On" (2025)
- Prettier With Your Mask Off (2026)
