= Elwood L. Perry =

Inventor of the spoonplug fishing lure and author

Elwood "Buck" Lake Perry (15 July 1915 in Hickory, North Carolina – 12 August 2005 in Taylorsville, North Carolina) was the inventor of the form of fishing lure known as the spoonplug, along with being an author.

Perry earning a bachelor's degree in physics and mathematics from Lenoir-Rhyne College and then taught and coached at Hickory High School. In World War II he was a lieutenant-colonel in the United States Army Transportation Corps in the European theatre. After the war he returned to Hickory, N.C. to work in the family business with his father and brother. In 1946 he invented the spoonplug and soon went into business selling the fishing lures manufactured by him and his first wife Marjorie. Business was slow until 1957 when he had a major success in sales promotion.

It was an airplane pilot named Don Nichols who first convinced Perry to promote his Spoonplugs in Chicago. Perry and outdoor writer Tom McNally fished Lake Marie, which was reportedly fished out, and put a hurt on the fish. Word spread quickly and he began promotions throughout the upper Midwest.

Perry published in 1965 a 31-page guide Spoonplugging: for fresh water bass and all game fish and in 1973 a 275-page book Spoonplugging: your guide to lunker catches. He also published a nine-volume Home Study Series in 1981. His bi-monthly newsletter, Buck Perry's The National Spoonplugger, is still published. The fishing lures and the book Spoonplugging are still sold by the privately held Buck Perry Company in Hickory, N.C.

Mr. Perry was known to three generations of fishermen as Buck, with his name forever linked to the lure he patented in 1946, the Spoonplug. He sold millions of the lures, which meld two pieces of traditional tackle, the spoon and the plug. ... Mr. Perry's fishing system was called Spoonplugging, but Spoonplugs were not really the most important part of it. His concern was the essence of fishing: the migration of fish, underwater topography, weather, water conditions and much more; "structure fishing," he called it.

Perry was married to his first wife, Marjorie Bud Setzer Perry, for 39 years; she died in 1978. He was married to his second wife, Geraldine Jeri Stowe Perry, until his death.

He is credited as being the father of structure fishing and was later inducted into the National Freshwater Fishing Hall of Fame.
