= Hickory High School (North Carolina) =

American public school in North Carolina

Location
- 1234 3rd Street NE; Hickory, North Carolina 28601; United States; 35°44′58″N 81°19′56″W

Information
- Former names: Claremont Central High School (1925–1972)
- Type: Public
- Established: 1917 (109 years ago)
- School district: Hickory City Schools
- CEEB code: 341815
- Principal: Wendi Craven
- Staff: 57.50 (FTE)
- Faculty: 91
- Grades: 9–12
- Enrollment: 1,034 (2023-2024)
- Student to teacher ratio: 17.98
- Colors: Garnet and gold
- Athletics: NCHSAA 5A
- Athletics conference: Western Foothills 4A/5A
- Mascot: Tommy the Tornado
- Team name: Red Tornados
- Website: hickoryhigh.hickoryschools.net

Hickory High School is located in Hickory, North Carolina, United States. It is a public high school in the Hickory City School system, located in Catawba County.

== History ==
The first building that housed Hickory High School, was located at 432 4th Avenue SW Hickory, NC 28603, and opened September 17, 1917. When Hickory High School relocated from this site, the remaining building became the Green Park Elementary School, before serving as the Hickory City Schools administration building.

The second building that housed what is now Hickory High, was named Claremont Central High School, and was located at 243 3rd Avenue NE Hickory, NC 28601. After the name change, many people continued to refer to the school as Hickory High School. The deed was signed for the high school on January 26, 1924; however, it did not open until October 9, 1925. The school remained at this location for 47 years. Twelve years after the school relocated from its second building, the former Claremont Central High School was designated as a local landmark by the City of Hickory and listed on the National Register of Historic Places a year later.

In 1972, Hickory High School moved to its current location of 1234 3rd Street NE. The Hickory Board of Education agreed to officially name the new school building its original name once again, Hickory High School. Hickory High is currently classified as a NCHSAA 5A high school. It is the largest school within the Hickory City School district.

== Athletics ==
Hickory is a member of the North Carolina High School Athletic Association (NCHSAA) and are classified as a 5A school. The school is a part of the Western Foothills 4A/5A Conference. Hickory's school colors are garnet and gold, and its team name is the Red Tornadoes. Sports at Hickory include:

- Baseball
- Basketball
- Cheerleading
- Cross Country
- Football
- Golf
- Lacrosse
- Marching Band
- Soccer
- Softball
- Swimming
- Tennis
- Track & Field
- Volleyball
- Wrestling

=== State Championships ===
Hickory has won the following NCHSAA team state championships:

- Girl's Basketball: 1995 (3A), 1998 (3A), 1999 (3A), 2015 (3A)
- Football: 1996 (3A), 2023 (3A)
- Boy's Golf: 2001 (3A), 2003 (3A), 2007 (3A), 2009 (3A)
- Boy's Soccer: 2001 (3A), 2022 (3A)
- Girl's Swimming & Diving: 1981 (All Classes), 1994 (1A/2A/3A)
- Boy's Tennis: 1989 (4A), 2004 (3A), 2006 (3A), 2021 (3A), 2023 (3A)
- Girl's Tennis: 1970 (All Classes), 1993 (3A), 2006 (3A)
- Volleyball: 2025 (5A)

== Clubs and organizations ==
The Quill Writing Team competes in writing competitions, in which they are given 90 minutes to complete an essay on given writing prompts. In 2016 and 2017, they won The Quill State Finals.

== Notable people ==
=== Alumni ===
- Austin M. Allran, member of the North Carolina General Assembly
- Jeff Barkley, former MLB pitcher
- Rick Barnes, college basketball head coach
- Harry Dowda, former NFL defensive back
- Gary Glenn, political activist and former member of the Michigan House of Representatives
- Ryan Hill, long-distance track runner
- Austin Johnson, former NFL fullback
- E. Patrick Johnson, the Carlos Montezuma Professor of Performance Studies and Professor of African-American Studies at Northwestern University
- Johnny Mackorell, professional football player and coach
- Trevin Parks, professional basketball player
- J.T. Poston, professional golfer
- Ryan Succop, former NFL kicker, Super Bowl LV champion with the Tampa Bay Buccaneers
- Chris Washburn, former NBA player
- Andy Wells, served in the North Carolina House of Representatives and North Carolina Senate

=== Faculty ===
- Frank Barger, high school athletics coach and member of the North Carolina Sports Hall of Fame
- Elwood L. Perry (nicknamed “Buck” Perry) teacher, author, and inventor of the fishing lure known as the spoonplug
