= Cheyenne Hunt =

American social media influencer, attorney, and political candidate

Cheyenne Hunt-Majer
- Born: 1996 or 1997 (age 29–30); Southern California
- Education: University of Denver, University of California, Irvine School of Law
- Occupations: Social media influencer, attorney, political candidate
- Political party: Democratic Party

Cheyenne Hunt-Majer, known as Cheyenne Hunt, is an American attorney, social media influencer, and political candidate. She first gained media attention in 2020 for her progressive social media content. In 2024, she was a candidate for the 45th Congressional District of California, where she failed to advance from the primary. She also worked as Executive Director of Gen Z for Change.

She has been cited as largely responsible for the withdrawal of Graham Platner and, together with Arielle Fodor, responsible for that of Eric Swalwell through the social media content created by them.

== Biography ==
Hunt grew up in Southern California as a descendant of Syrian refugees. She attended the University of Denver before attending University of California, Irvine School of Law. She was the first in her family to go to college. During law school, she was the youngest ever law clerk for Sen. Amy Klobuchar, where she worked on the first impeachment of Donald Trump. She subsequently became a social media influencer, where she posted on political topics. She also worked as a Big Tech Accountability Advocate at Public Citizen.

In 2024, she ran for Congress in California's 45th congressional district as a Democrat. She would have been the first Gen Z woman elected to Congress had she won the election, and her platform emphasized that. She also ran on climate change and abortion rights. She discussed the economy frequently. She ultimately lost in the primary. She went on to work as Executive Director of Gen-Z for Change.

On March 31, 2026, Hunt posted a video about Eric Swalwell asserting that he had a "known history of being predatory towards women", due to her friend alleging that Swalwell sexually harassed her. The two had partnered with fellow content creator Arielle Fodor, who had also been posting about this subject due to allegations she had been informed of. By mid-April, Swalwell dropped out of the 2026 California gubernatorial election, where he had previously been the frontrunner, and resigned from congress. She asserted that there were dozens of further allegations against Swalwell.

Later that same year, she became one of the leaders of the campaign against Graham Platner, then the Democratic nominee in the 2026 United States Senate election in Maine, where she helped publicize accusations against Platner. Platner and his team alleged she was an "out of state establishment operative", but top Platner allies such as Ro Khanna withdrew their endorsements on her advice. She had previously endorsed Platner.

She has since founded non-profit Reckoning Action, which she has described as "Me Too part 2". The non-profit has advocated for political candidates to not be able to use donations on misconduct cases and is working on a federal ban. She has frequently been reached out to by survivors of sexual abuse and domestic violence, who she has often helped. In response to questions about whether she's concerned she may go too far, she stated "We don't see the backlash as... some sign of failure or something to be avoided." She further stated "This is a reckoning."
