= Gen-Z for Change =

American non-profit advocacy organization

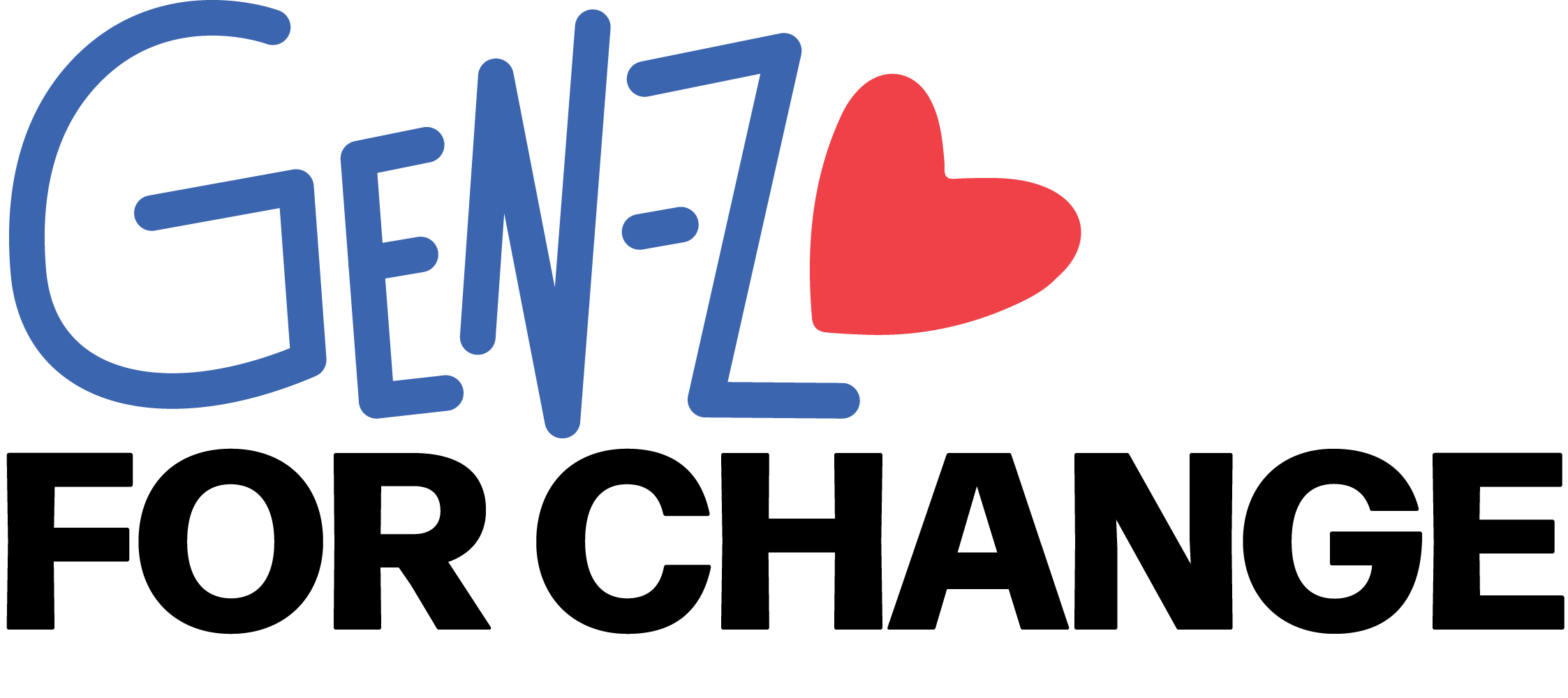
- Nickname: Gen-Z X el Cambio
- Formation: October 2020; 6 years ago
- Founder: Aidan Kohn-Murphy
- Type: Nonprofit
- Tax ID no.: 87-2835389
- Legal status: Non-profit advocacy organization; 501(c)(4)
- Location: United States
- Methods: Social media, digital organizing, activism
- Members: 500+
- Interim Executive Director: Aidan Kohn-Murphy
- Key people: Cheyenne Hunt (former executive director)
- Staff: 15–20
- Website: genzforchange.org
- Formerly called: TikTok for Biden, Gen-Z por el Cambio

TikTok information
- Page: Gen-Z for Change
- Followers: 1.8 million
- Last updated: June 12, 2026

Gen-Z for Change, formerly called TikTok for Biden, (Spanish: Gen-Z X el Cambio, formerly Gen-Z por el Cambio) is a self-described progressive American advocacy organisation, founded in 2020 that uses social media to promote civil discourse and action among members of Generation Z. It consists of a core team of 15–20 people and a coalition of over 500 content creators and activists, and partners with influencers, activists and celebrities to produce content for the organization. Its advocacy addresses a wide range of topics such as abortion rights, COVID-19, student debt cancellation, climate change, income inequality, social inequality, immigration, racial justice, gun control, foreign policy, voting rights, and LGBTQ issues. Collectively, Gen-Z for Change's satellites have 540 million followers and receive 1.5 billion monthly views on social media.

Gen-Z for Change has received significant news coverage for its activities, including a one-hour briefing with the White House for 30 prominent TikTok content creators about the United States’ strategic goals, including arguing against the Russian invasion of Ukraine (which was parodied by Saturday Night Live), protests and boycotts against companies such as Starbucks and Kroger for anti-union firings, and abortion-rights advocacy following the U.S. Supreme Court's decision to overturn Roe v. Wade in June 2022. Olivia Julianna, one of Gen-Z for Change's political strategists, raised more than $2 million in donations for abortion funds across the country through the organization after U.S. Representative Matt Gaetz ridiculed her appearance in July 2022.

== History ==
The organization's account on TikTok was created in October 2020 under the name TikTok for Biden, to support Joe Biden during the 2020 presidential election in the United States. The organization was renamed Gen-Z for Change in January 2021.

In early March 2022, the presidency of Joe Biden enlisted Gen-Z for Change to help organize a briefing between senior administration officials and prominent social media influencers about the Russo-Ukrainian War. The briefing was leaked to The Washington Post, which later inspired a sketch on NBC's comedy show Saturday Night Live. Prior to that, Gen-Z for Change partnered with the White House and United States Department of Health and Human Services to combat COVID-19, and tell viewers to commit to vaccination Although the organization has regularly criticised the Biden administration, some have worried about their close ties to each other.

In late 2023, Gen-Z por el Cambio was established as a section dedicated to Latino and Latin American views on issues like immigration. It is now called Gen-Z X el Cambio.

In March 2024, Gen-Z for Change, with organizations like March for Our Lives, Sunrise Movement, and United We Dream Action, submitted a petition to Biden, which included U.S. democracy, climate change, and immigration. The organization refused to endorse Biden's re-election campaign, with Executive Director Elise Joshi citing his support of the fossil fuel economy, mishandling of the pandemic, support for Israel during the Gaza war, and crackdown on immigration. However, 2 hours after Biden withdrew on July 21, it endorsed Kamala Harris's imminent campaign.

== Members and associates ==
=== Current ===
- Cheyenne Hunt (executive director)
- Victoria Hammett
- Jack Petocz
- Sofia Ongele
- Zoe Shipley
- Dominique Demetz
- Sean Wiggs
- Anthony "Tony" Guevara

=== Former ===
- Olivia Julianna — Director of Policy and Government Affairs
- Claire Simon
- Sam Shlafstein
- Sam Schmir
- Lily Joy Winder
- Cooper Schneider

== See also ==
- Political views of Generation Z
- Generation Z in the United States
- Social media use in politics
- Youth activism
- Youth politics
