= W. H. Atkinson =

American racing driver

- Born: September 16, 1934; Waycross, Georgia, U.S.
- Died: March 15, 2010 (aged 75); Bunnell, Florida, U.S.

NASCAR Cup Series career
- 1 race run over 1 year
- Best finish: 276th (1956)
- First race: 1956 Daytona 160 (Daytona Beach Road Course)
Wins	Top tens	Poles
0	0	0

William Harry Atkinson III (September 16, 1934 – March 15, 2010) was an American auto dealer and stock car racing driver. He competed in one event in the NASCAR Grand National Division, now the NASCAR Cup Series.

== Personal life ==
Born in Waycross, Georgia in 1934, Atkinson and his family moved to Bunnell, Florida in 1943, with his father purchasing the Bunnell Motor Company in 1944. A 1952 graduate of Bunnell High School, Atkinson took over the business upon the death of his father in 1962, operating the company until 1975. He also served two terms as a city commissioner in Bunnell.

== Racing career ==
Atkinson competed in stock car auto racing during the early and mid-1950s, competing in a single event in the NASCAR Grand National Division in 1956 at the Daytona Beach and Road Course. Starting 48th in a field of 80 cars, Atkinson finished 51st overall in the No. 265 Ford owned by his father.

Atkinson, through the Bunnell Motor Company, sponsored the 1967 Daytona 500-winning car of Mario Andretti.

== Death ==
Atkinson died of natural causes on March 15, 2010, at his home in Bunnell. He had been married for 35 years and had three sons and two daughters.
