= Bunnell, Florida =

- City
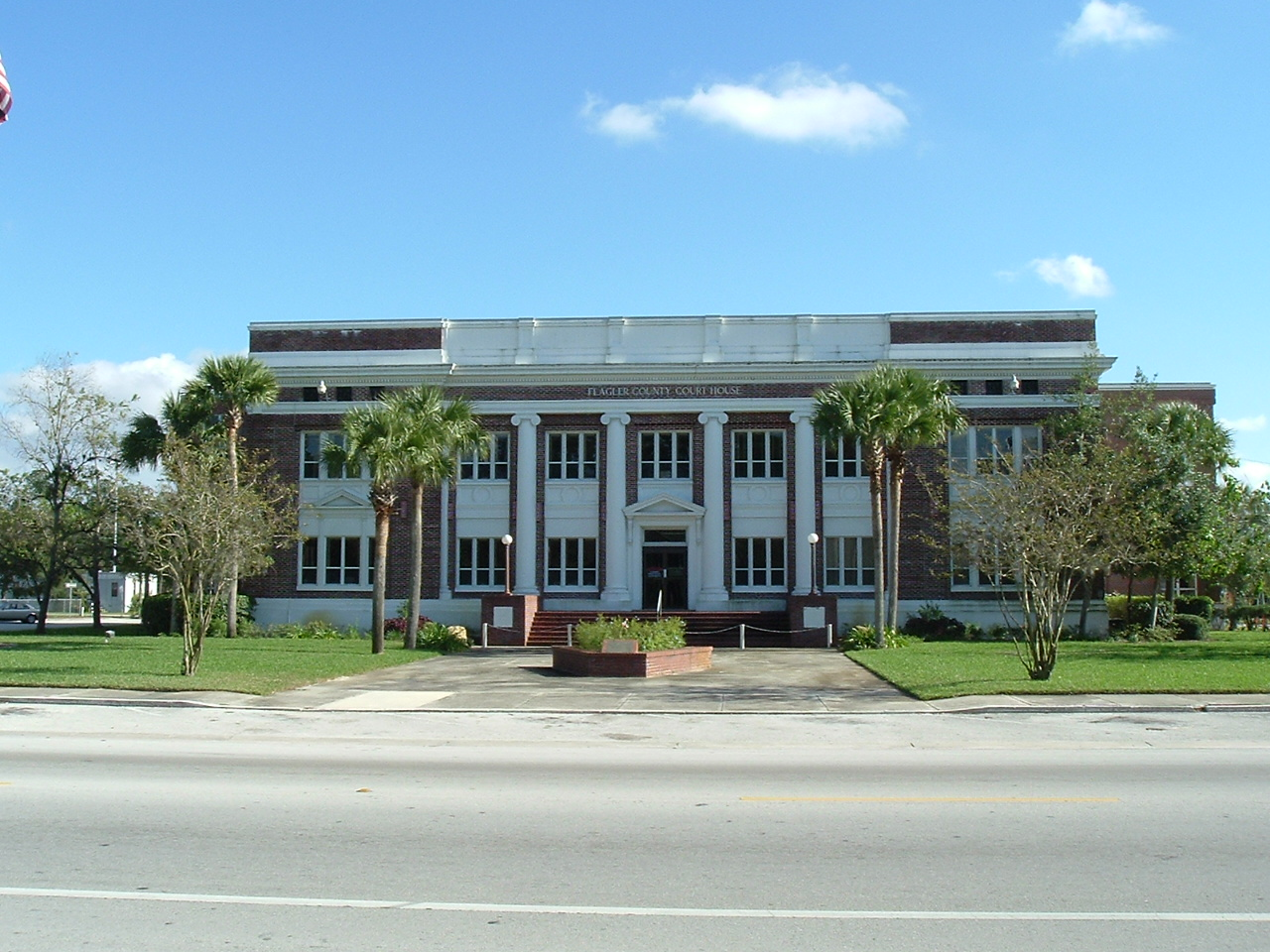
- Old Flagler County Courthouse

- Seal

- Location in Flagler County and the state of Florida
- Coordinates: 29°29′03″N 81°25′15″W
- Country: United States
- State: Florida
- County: Flagler
- Settled: 1880s
- Incorporated (town): 1913
- Incorporated (city): 1924

Government
  - Type: Commission–Manager
  - Mayor: Catherine Robinson
  - City Manager: Alvin B. Jackson Jr.

Area
  - Total: 139.86 sq mi (362.24 km^{2})
  - Land: 139.80 sq mi (362.07 km^{2})
  - Water: 0.062 sq mi (0.16 km^{2})
- Elevation: 10 ft (3.0 m)

Population (2020)
  - Total: 3,276
  - Density: 23.4/sq mi (9.05/km^{2})
- Time zone: UTC-5 (Eastern (EST))
  - Summer (DST): UTC-4 (EDT)
- ZIP code: 32110
- Area code: 386
- FIPS code: 12-09550
- GNIS feature ID: 2403953
- Website: www.bunnellcity.us

Bunnell is the county seat of Flagler County, Florida, United States, with a population of 3,276 at the 2020 census. The city is part of the Deltona–Daytona Beach–Ormond Beach, FL metropolitan statistical area and is named after an early resident, Alvah A. Bunnell, a shingle maker and supplier of wood to the area's fledgling rail industry.

== Geography ==
Bunnell is located in central Flagler County. The city limits now extend south and northwest to the county boundary. Bunnell is bordered to the north and east by the city of Palm Coast.

U.S. Route 1 passes through the center of Bunnell as State Street, leading north 31 miles (50 km) to St. Augustine and southeast 18 miles (29 km) to Ormond Beach. Florida State Road 100 leads 8 miles (13 km) east to Flagler Beach and northwest 30 miles (48 km) to Palatka. Interstate 95 is 4 miles (6 km) east of the center of Bunnell via SR 100.

According to the United States Census Bureau, the city has a total area of 138.6 square miles (358.9 km^{2}), of which 137.5 square miles (356.0 km^{2}) is land and 1.1 square miles (2.9 km^{2}), or 0.81%, is water.

Since 2000, Bunnell is the second-largest city in the state of Florida (by area) with the annexation of over 87,000 acres, which equals 136.000 square miles (352.238 km^{2}).

=== Climate ===
The City of Bunnell is part of the humid subtropical climate zone with a Köppen Climate Classification of "Cfa" (C = mild temperate, f = fully humid, and a = hot summer).

== Demographics ==
Historical population
| Census | Pop. | Note | %± |
|---|---|---|---|
| 1920 | 682 | | — |
| 1930 | 671 | | −1.6% |
| 1940 | 1,030 | | 53.5% |
| 1950 | 1,341 | | 30.2% |
| 1960 | 1,860 | | 38.7% |
| 1970 | 1,687 | | −9.3% |
| 1980 | 1,816 | | 7.6% |
| 1990 | 1,873 | | 3.1% |
| 2000 | 2,122 | | 13.3% |
| 2010 | 2,676 | | 26.1% |
| 2020 | 3,276 | | 22.4% |
U.S. Decennial Census

=== 2010 and 2020 census ===
Bunnell racial composition (Hispanics excluded from racial categories) (NH = Non-Hispanic)
| Race | Pop 2010 | Pop 2020 | % 2010 | % 2020 |
|---|---|---|---|---|
| White (NH) | 1,602 | 2,101 | 59.87% | 64.13% |
| Black or African American (NH) | 848 | 773 | 31.69% | 23.60% |
| Native American or Alaska Native (NH) | 13 | 12 | 0.49% | 0.37% |
| Asian (NH) | 7 | 24 | 0.26% | 0.73% |
| Pacific Islander or Native Hawaiian (NH) | 0 | 0 | 0.00% | 0.00% |
| Some other race (NH) | 6 | 9 | 0.22% | 0.27% |
| Two or more races/Multiracial (NH) | 55 | 120 | 2.06% | 3.66% |
| Hispanic or Latino (any race) | 145 | 237 | 5.42% | 7.23% |
| Total | 2,676 | 3,276 | | |

As of the 2020 United States census, there were 3,276 people, 1,072 households, and 592 families residing in the city.

As of the 2010 United States census, there were 2,676 people, 985 households, and 542 families residing in the city.

=== 2000 census ===
As of the census of 2000, there were 2,122 people, 845 households, and 490 families residing in the city. The population density was 455.0 inhabitants per square mile (175.7/km^{2}). There were 959 housing units at an average density of 205.6 per square mile (79.4/km^{2}). The racial makeup of the city was 63.71% White, 32.56% African American, 0.19% Native American, 0.94% Asian, 1.27% from other races, and 1.32% from two or more races. Hispanic or Latino of any race were 3.63% of the population.

In 2000, there were 845 households, out of which 25.7% had children under the age of 18 living with them, 33.8% were married couples living together, 19.3% had a female householder with no husband present, and 42.0% were non-families. 36.6% of all households were made up of individuals, and 11.2% had someone living alone who was 65 years of age or older. The average household size was 2.29 and the average family size was 3.00.

In 2000, in the city, the population was spread out, with 23.2% under the age of 18, 9.4% from 18 to 24, 25.0% from 25 to 44, 24.5% from 45 to 64, and 17.9% who were 65 years of age or older. The median age was 40 years. For every 100 females, there were 90.0 males. For every 100 females age 18 and over, there were 88.8 males.

In 2000, the median income for a household in the city was $21,210, and the median income for a family was $25,231. Males had a median income of $27,500 versus $17,891 for females. The per capita income for the city was $13,274. About 20.1% of families and 22.5% of the population were below the poverty line, including 32.5% of those under age 18 and 13.1% of those age 65 or over.

== Architectural landmarks ==
- Bunnell Water Tower
- Lambert House. Oldest existing building in Bunnell. Built by James Frank “Major” Lambert in 1909.
- Old Bunnell State Bank Building. Masonry vernacular, 1910. In 1992, it was added to the U.S. National Register of Historic Places.
- George Moody House. Craftsman style, 1917.
- William Henry “Doc” Deen House. Frame vernacular, 1918.
- Holden House Museum. Craftsman bungalow, 1918. Now owned by the Flagler County Historical Society.
- Old Flagler County Courthouse. Neoclassical style designed by Wilbur Talley, 1926. Officially dedicated on July 28, 1927.
- Little Red School House Museum. Constructed by Bunnell High School Future Farmers of America students in 1938.

== Notable people ==
- W. H. Atkinson, NASCAR racing driver
- Mardy Gilyard, NFL football player
- Eddie Johnson, player on United States men's national soccer team
- Bill T. Jones, Tony Award winner for choreography
- Terence Steward, former NFL football player
- Charlie Turner, musician
