= Austin Johnson (fullback) =

American football player (born 1989)

No. 35, 46
- Position: Fullback

Personal information
- Born: June 16, 1989 (age 37); Hickory, North Carolina, U.S.
- Listed height: 6 ft 2 in (1.88 m)
- Listed weight: 240 lb (109 kg)

Career information
- High school: Hickory
- College: Tennessee (2008–2011)
- NFL draft: 2012: undrafted

Career history
- Baltimore Ravens (2012)*; New Orleans Saints (2013–2016); Tampa Bay Buccaneers (2016–2017)
- * Offseason or practice squad member only

Career NFL statistics
- Rushing attempts: 12
- Rushing yards: 31
- Rushing touchdowns: 1
- Receptions: 7
- Receiving yards: 45
- Receiving touchdowns: 1
- Stats at Pro Football Reference

Austin Johnson (born June 16, 1989) is an American former professional football player who was a fullback in the National Football League (NFL). He played college football for the Tennessee Volunteers.

== Early life ==
Johnson played football and baseball at Hickory High School in Hickory, North Carolina. He was an all-state selection for football in 2006 and 2007. He recorded 692 rushing yards and 18 rushing touchdowns on 108 attempts his senior year. Johnson also recorded 35 receptions and 470 receiving yards. He finished his high school career with 580 tackles.

== College career ==
Johnson played for the Tennessee Volunteers from 2008 to 2011. He was an Academic All-SEC selection in 2008, 2009, and 2010.

== Professional career ==
Pre-draft measurables
Height	Weight	40-yard dash	10-yard split	20-yard split	20-yard shuttle	Three-cone drill	Vertical jump	Broad jump	Bench press
6 ft 1 1/2 in (1.87 m)	241 lb (109 kg)	4.71 s	1.67 s	2.77 s	4.37 s	7.32 s	30.5 in (0.77 m)	8 ft 10 in (2.69 m)	25 reps
All values from Tennessee's Pro Day

=== Baltimore Ravens ===
Johnson was signed by the Baltimore Ravens of the NFL on April 29, 2012, after going undrafted in the 2012 NFL draft.

=== New Orleans Saints ===
Johnson signed with the NFL's New Orleans Saints on January 7, 2013. He was released by the Saints on August 31, and was re-signed to the Saints' practice squad on September 4.

Johnson made his NFL debut on September 7, 2014, against the Atlanta Falcons. Johnson suffered a knee injury in the Saints' Week 8 game against the Green Bay Packers; on November 4, the Saints placed him on the injured reserve list, ending his season. He was released by the Saints on November 3, 2015, and was re-signed to the team's practice squad two days later. Johnson was promoted to the active roster on December 9.

Johnson was re-signed by New Orleans on February 10, 2016. On September 3, he was waived by the Saints. Johnson was then re-signed to the Saints' practice squad the next day. He was released by the team once more on September 13.

=== Tampa Bay Buccaneers ===
On December 14, 2016, Johnson was signed to the Tampa Bay Buccaneers' practice squad. He was promoted to the active roster on December 28. He was waived on September 2, 2017, and was re-signed to the Buccaneers' practice squad the next day. Johnson was released on October 10. He was re-signed to the practice squad on December 20.

Johnson signed a reserve/future contract with the Buccaneers on January 3, 2018. On September 1, Johnson was waived by the Buccaneers.
