= Bunnell Water Tower =

- U.S. National Register of Historic Places
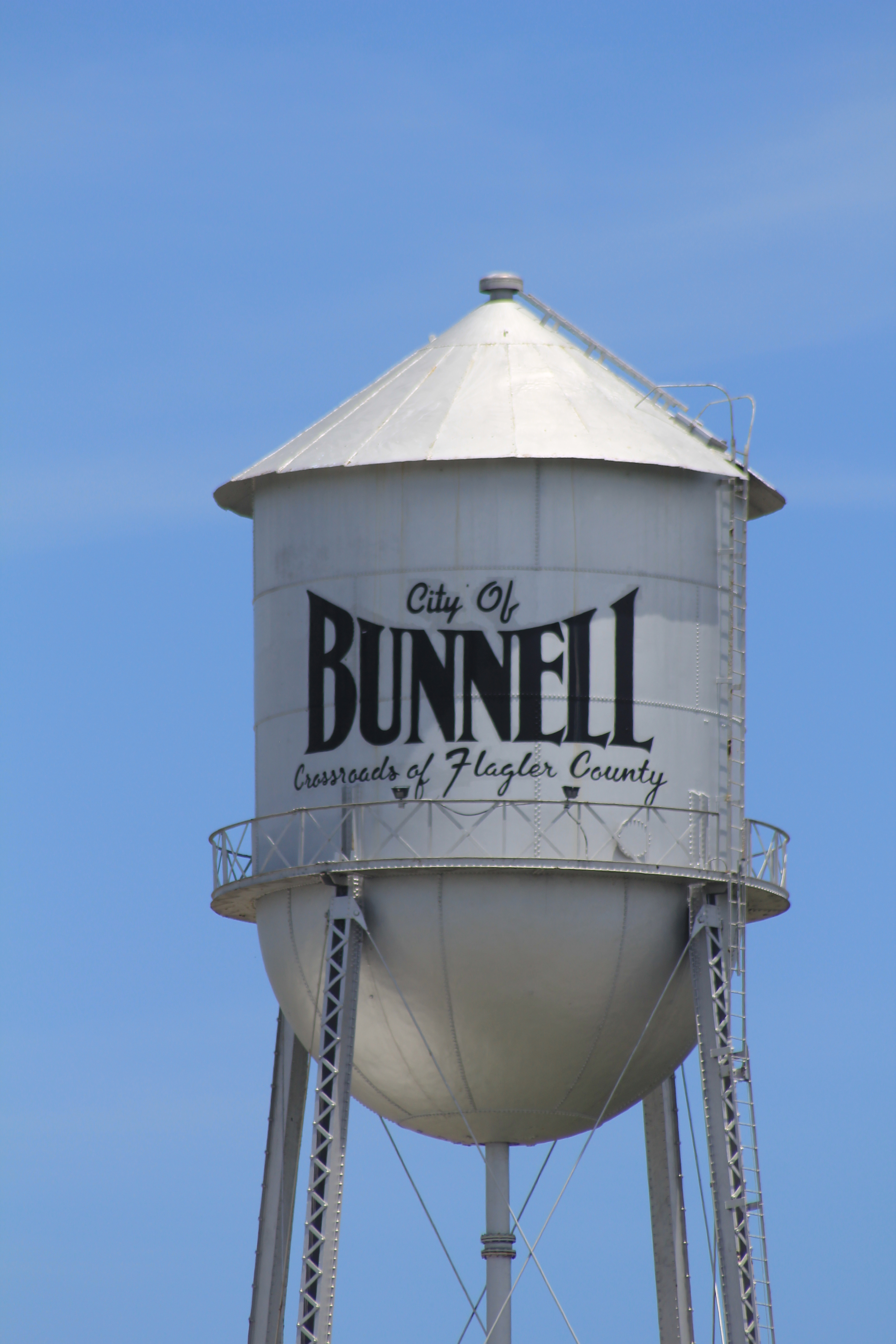
- Bunnell Water Tower - West Side View of Elevated Tank.

- Location within Florida Location within the United States
- Interactive map showing the location of Bunnell Water Tower
- Location: 100 Utility Street, Bunnell, Florida
- Coordinates: 29°28′0.079″N 81°15′25.449″W
- Area: 3.728
- Built: 1926 (Erected in 1927)
- Architect: Chicago Bridge & Iron Company
- Architectural style: Early 20th Century Elevated Steel Water Tower
- NRHP reference No.: 100003407
- Added to NRHP: 4 February 2019

Towering over the City of Bunnell is the city's most visible and iconic landmark: the City of Bunnell elevated steel water tower. The water tower is located at 100 Utility Street, Bunnell, FL 32110. It was built in 1926 by Chicago Bridge & Iron Company as part of a new waterworks system for Bunnell that went into operation in December 1927 and has been providing water to residents and local businesses to this day. The water tower is 110 feet high and its elevated steel tank holds 75,000 gallons of water. The elevated steel water tank has a conical top, Horton hemispherical bottom and is supported by four steel columns (legs) and reinforced with steel cross braces. The east and west sides of the elevated tank have black painted signage that read “City of Bunnell, Crossroads of Flagler County”

== Water works system project of 1927 ==
In January 1927, Bunnell signed a contract with the Gray Artesian Well Company of St. Augustine to drill a well approximately 90 feet deep with casing that is suitable for pumping for the new waterworks system. After the well was completed water was tested by the Florida State Board of Health who declared it to be of fine quality, pure with no color or taste and with only three hundred to a million hardness. A second well was drilled so there would be a sufficient quantity of water for the city as it grew. The contracted price for these wells was $2,375 each.

Bids for furnishing materials, labor and construction for the new waterworks were opened on March 28, 1927. More than fifteen bids were received by Engineer N.A. Hotard. On April 11, 1927, the Bunnell city commission awarded the contract to the Hopper Construction Company.

On July 7, 1927, material began arriving at the site of the new water plant, which was determined by the newly dug artesian wells. F.W. Hopper, of the Hooper Construction Company, stated that the project would most likely be finished in 140 working days and ahead of schedule. Construction of the new water system did move fast and by September 8, 1927 the majority of the main pipes and fire hydrants were installed and concrete forms for the reservoir were nearly completed. Representatives from the Chicago Bridge & Iron Works were working on erecting the steel water tank and its tower. The city purchased the steel water tower through the J.B. McCrary Company.

On October 27, 1927, Engineer Paynter, who was leading the construction project of the new waterworks predicted that the system would be operational by December 1, 1927 despite a pump that was scheduled to arrive late. Paynter also announced that the new system could temporarily be connected to the present water source until the new wells and pumps are available. The potential delay regarding cutting up sections of State Road No. 4 was avoided when chairman of the Bunnell city commission, J.J. McLanahan, announced that a satisfactory agreement with State Road Engineer Thrasher was reached. The agreement details were that four places in State Road No. 4 will be cut up and after the water mains are installed the trenches will be covered and refilled with concrete.

On December 1, 1927, Bunnell City Clerk, John Gerz, announced that due to a few construction delays the new waterworks system should be operational within the next two weeks. Some water meters were still pending installation but Gerz said they would be ready when the new system is ready to be turned on. Bunnell officials said, “this will prove in time [to be] one of the best advertisements for Bunnell that could be named”.

== New water works system put into operation in 1927 ==
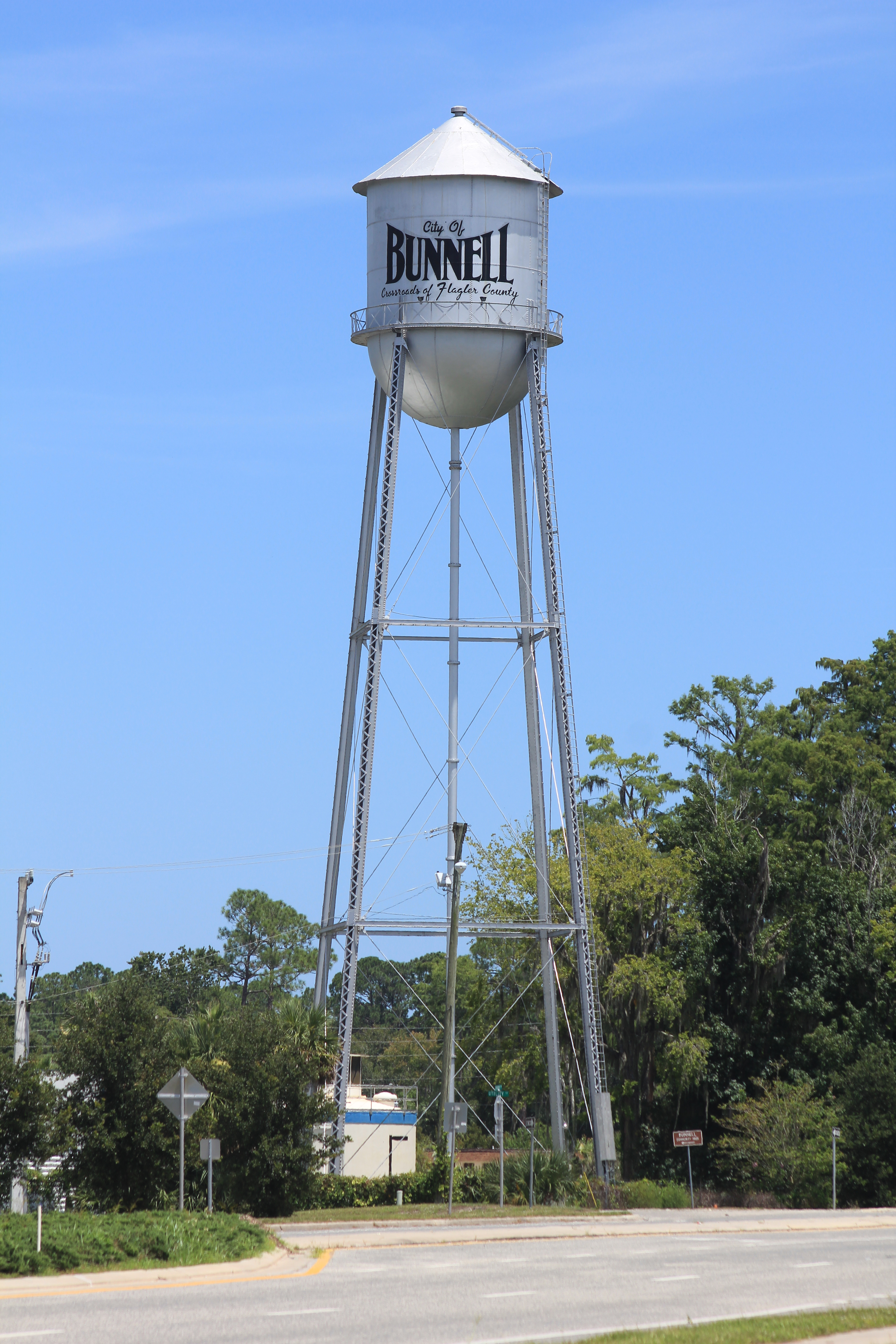
Bunnell Water Tower - Full West View of Water Tower.

On December 12, 1927, Bunnell's new waterworks system went operational. Almost immediately the old system's lines were cut off and all consumers were connected onto the new waterworks system. The Flagler Tribune reported on December 15, 1927 that “One of the most important events ever to occur in Bunnell took place this week when the new $100,000 waterworks system was turned on for the first time…” The new waterworks system included several miles of 10, 8, 6 and 2 inch mains that were laid on all city streets, fire hydrants, an elevated steel water tank on tower, storage reservoir and a pumping station. Water samples from the new waterworks system were taken on a monthly basis and sent to the Florida State Board of Health in Jacksonville to be examined by a chemist. According to a report published in the Flagler Tribune on June 28, 1928 Chief Engineer, E.L. Filby stated, “from the…analytical data we would say that the bacterial or sanitary quality of your water is very good.”

== Current usage ==
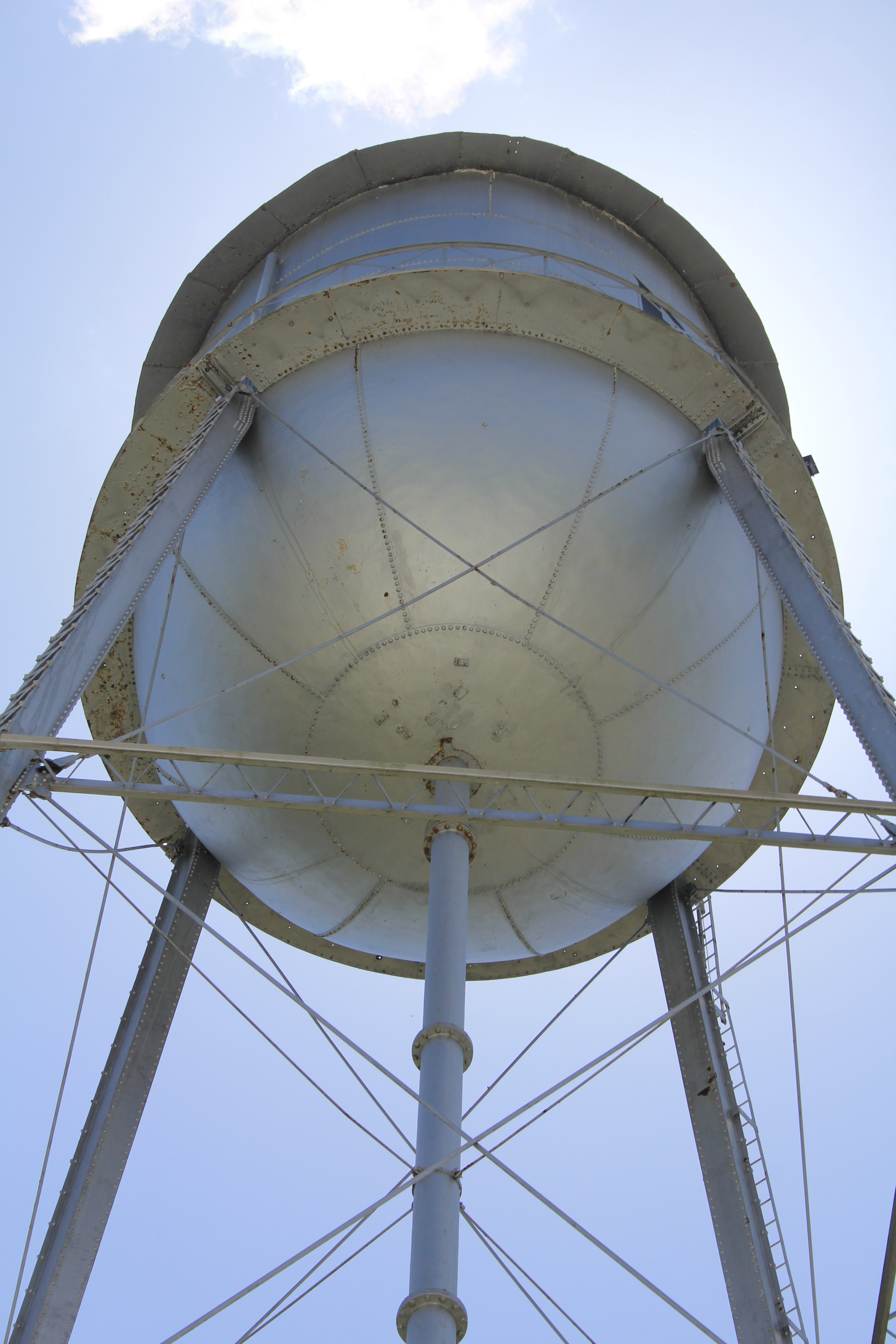
Bunnell Water Tower - Bottom SW View of Tank.

Currently, the Bunnell Water Tower is in daily usage, over ninety years since it first went into operation, and provides the City of Bunnell with water during emergencies when electric and generator sources are not available. The city's two modern 350,000 gallon ground storage tanks cannot provide sufficient water pressure during these types of emergencies. The Bunnell Water Tower is inspected each year and is repainted every five years.

== Listing on the National Register of Historic Places ==
The initial nomination was approved by the Florida National Register Review Board on November 8, 2018 and was then sent to the U.S. Department of the Interior, National Park Service for final approval by the Keeper of the National Register. On February 4, 2019, the Bunnell Water Tower was officially listed on the National Register of Historic Places.
