= 2021 GLAAD 20 Under 20 =

List recognizing young professionals

2020 GLAAD 20 Under 20
- Sponsored by: Teen Vogue; Google; UGG; Shutterfly
- Date: June 22, 2021
- Website: glaad.org/20-under-20/2021/

The 2021 GLAAD 20 Under 20 was the second annual list released by GLAAD recognizing 20 LGBTQ+ individuals under the age of 20 for their contributions to promoting acceptance, visibility and equality through activism, media, advocacy, and arts.

The list was announced on 22 June 2021 in partnership with Teen Vogue and highlighted the impact of young LGBTQ+ leaders across various fields.

== Honorees ==
This was the official honorees for the second annual list of the GLAAD 20 Under 20.

#	Name	Age	Pronouns	Profession
1	Amiri Nash	19	he/him	Artist, activist & writer
2	Andrea Alejandra Gonzales	20	she/they	Community organizer & educator
3	Andrew Adams	20	he/him	Student & activist
4	Ashton Mota	16	he/him	Student & activist
5	Austin Houck	20	he/him	Student & activist
6	Cyn Gómez	18	they/them	Student & activist
7	Darid Prom	20	Any pronouns	Student, activist & community organizer
8	Eli Bundy	17	they/them	Student & activist
9	Gia Parr	17	she/her	Student & activist
10	JoJo Siwa	18	she/her	Popstar
11	Kaylyn Suji Ahn	17	she/they	Student & activist
12	Max Prestigiacomo	19	he/him	Student, community organizer & politician
13	Molly Pinta	15	she/her	Student & activist
14	Mxmtoon	20	she/her	Artist, singer-songwriter & actress
15	Onyx (E. Smith)	19	they/them	Student & activist
16	Soleil Wheeler (Ewok)	15	he/him	Professional streamer
17	Stella Keating	16	she/her	Student & activist
18	Trevor Wilkinson	18	he/him	Student & activist
19	Ve’ondre Mitchell	17	she/her	Social media influencer & activist
20	Yasmin Finney	17	she/her	Actress
