= Flagler Palm Coast High School =

Location
- 5500 East Highway 100; Palm Coast, Florida 32164; United States; 29.4771974°N 81.2095065°W

Information
- Type: Public
- Motto: "At FPC... "BE" A Bulldog."
- School district: Flagler County Schools
- Principal: Bobby Bossardet
- Faculty: 102 (2022–23)
- Enrollment: 2,563 (2023-2024)
- Colors: Green, White
- Mascot: Bulldog
- Rival: Matanzas High School
- Website: www.fpcbulldogs.com

Flagler Palm Coast High School (FPCHS) is a public high school located in Palm Coast, Florida, United States. It serves the residents of Flagler County.

== Academics ==
The school has four flagship programs:

- International Baccalaureate
- i3 New Tech Academy (project based learning academy)
- Aerounatical Academy (students earn up to 15 college credits from Embry–Riddle Aeronautical University)
- Fire Leadership Academy that works with the local Fire departments to offer coursework for students to leave high school prepared to take the state Fire exam and EMT exam.

Programs of Study:

- Advanced Manufacturing
- Aeronautics (Embry-Riddle Dual Enrollment)
- Allied Health (Medical Assisting)
- Carpentry
- Culinary
- Digital Media/Multimedia Foundations (Graphic Design)
- Digital Video Technology (TV Production)
- Entrepreneurship
- Fire Academy
- Veterinary Assisting

== Athletics ==
Fall Sports:

- Bowling
- Cheerleading
- Competitive Cheer
- Football
- Golf
- Swimming
- Track and Cross Country
- Volleyball

Winter Sports:

- Basketball
- Soccer
- Weightlifting
- Wrestling

Spring Sports:

- Baseball
- Cheerleading
- Flag Football
- Lacrosse
- Softball
- Tennis
- Track and Cross Country
- Weightlifting

== School rating ==
In 2017, the school was recognized in the U.S. News National Rankings and was awarded the Bronze Medal.

== Notable alumni ==
- Mardy Gilyard, former NFL player
- Terence Steward, former NFL player
- Jack Petocz, LGBTQ+ activist
