= Lenoir–Rhyne University =

Lutheran university in Hickory, North Carolina, US

Coordinates: 35.7402349°N 81.3255013°W

- Former names: Highland Academy (1891); Lenoir College (1891–1928); Lenoir–Rhyne College (1928–2008)
- Motto: ἡ ἀλήθεια ἐλευθερώσει ὑμᾶς (Greek)
- Motto in English: The truth shall set you free
- Type: Private university
- Established: 1891
- Religious affiliation: Evangelical Lutheran Church in America
- Academic affiliations: CONAHEC
- Endowment: $145.5 million (2025)
- Students: 2,405 (fall 2021)
- Undergraduates: 1,579
- Postgraduates: 826
- Location: Hickory, North Carolina, United States
- Campus: 107 acres (43 ha); Multiple campuses
- Colors: Red & Black
- Nickname: Bears
- Sporting affiliations: NCAA Division II – SAC
- Mascot: Joe Bear
- Website: lr.edu/
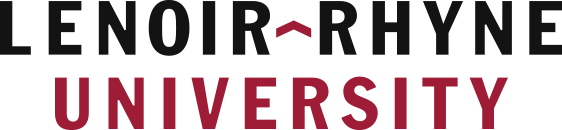

Lenoir–Rhyne University is a private university in Hickory, North Carolina, United States. It was founded in 1891 and is affiliated with the North Carolina Synod of the Evangelical Lutheran Church in America (ELCA).

== Academics ==
The university is accredited by the Commission on Colleges of the Southern Association of Colleges and Schools to award bachelor's and master's degrees. Overall, Lenoir–Rhyne University has over 50 undergraduate majors and nearly 30 graduate programs. The university has campuses in Hickory, Asheville, and Columbia, South Carolina.

== Athletics ==
Lenoir–Rhyne fields 20 intercollegiate teams and competes in National Collegiate Athletic Association Division II (NCAA Division II) as a member of the South Atlantic Conference. The school nickname is the Bears; its mascots are Joe and Josie Bear.

The school's swimming programs compete in the Bluegrass Mountain Swimming Conference and the men's lacrosse program was a member of the Deep South Lacrosse Conference until the conference dissolved in 2013. The men's and women's track & field and women's lacrosse teams compete as NCAA Division II Independents.

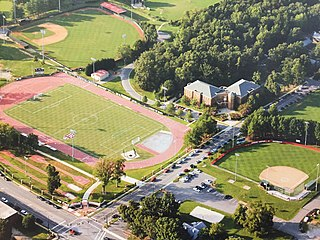
Moretz Sports Athletic Complex

Prior to competing in the NCAA, the university was a member of the National Association of Intercollegiate Athletics (NAIA). The Lenoir–Rhyne football team won the NAIA National Championship in 1960 and made three trips to the title game in four years. In 2013 the Lenoir–Rhyne football team made it to the 2013 NCAA Division II Football Championship game. In 1980, the Bears' women's basketball team reached the NAIA Final Four while the men's basketball squad made it to the NAIA Elite Eight in 1992.

Recently, the Lenoir–Rhyne softball team has seen six straight trips to the NCAA Division II Playoffs, and reached the Southeast Region Finals in 2010 and 2011. Also, the Bears' women's soccer team advanced to the NCAA Division II Elite Eight in 2010 after the program's most successful season to date. The Lenoir–Rhyne men's and women's basketball teams have both reached Division II NCAA postseason play several times in the 2000s, with the Bear women hosting the Southeast Region Tournament in 2009. In 2023, the LR Men's Lacrosse team won the Division II National Championship. They defeated Mercyhurst University by a score of 20–5. This is the first NCAA team championship win in the school's 125 years.

Men's and Women's Athletic Programs
Men's	Women's
Baseball	Softball
Basketball	Basketball
Cross Country	Cross Country
Football	Volleyball
Golf	Golf
Lacrosse	Lacrosse
Soccer	Soccer
Spirit Team	Spirit Team
Swimming	Swimming
Tennis	Tennis
Track & Field (Indoor & Outdoor)	Track & Field (Indoor & Outdoor)

== Student life ==
There are over 60 student clubs and organization on campus.

Undergraduate students are required to live on campus for their first three years. The university designates Morgan Hall, Isenhour Hall, and half of Fritz-Conrad Hall exclusively for freshman students. Upperclassmen housing includes Hickory House, Price Village, and Fourth Street apartments. In 2002 Lenoir-Rhyne built the Living Learning Center which provides upscale living and classroom space. Students who are part of the Lenoir-Rhyne Honors Academy or Greek Life may choose to live in designated on campus houses.

=== Fraternities and sororities ===
There are several fraternities and sororities on campus.

== Notable alumni ==
- Virginia Dare Aderholdt, cryptanalyst and Japanese translator
- Frank Barger, high school football coach
- Rick Barnes, men's college basketball head coach
- Cherie Berry, former North Carolina Commissioner of Labor
- James B. Black, former speaker of the North Carolina House of Representatives
- Lindsay Deal, baseball player
- Justin Dean, baseball player
- Claude DeBruhl, North Carolina House of Representatives
- Elizabeth K. Dillon, judge
- Kyle Dugger, football player
- Perry Fewell, football coach
- Gary Glenn, political activist
- David Hoyle, politician
- W. Stine Isenhower, politician
- Burgess Jenkins, actor
- Harold Johnson, sports commentator
- Craig Keith, football player
- Donnie Kirkpatrick, football coach
- John Milem, football player
- Don Padgett, baseball player
- Elwood L. Perry, fisherman
- Buz Phillips, baseball player
- Mike Pope, football player
- Tom Segura, stand-up comedian
- Dick Smith, baseball player
- Herm Starrette, baseball player
- Terence Steward, football player
- Aaron Wheeler, soccer player
- Dareke Young, football player
