= Deep South Conference =

- Conference: NCAA
- Founded: 1994
- Folded: 2013
- Commissioner: Steve Poston (at dissolution)
- Sports fielded: men's college lacrosse; men's: 1; women's: n/a
- Division: Division II
- No. of teams: 9 (at dissolution)
- Headquarters: Salisbury, North Carolina
- Region: Southeast US

The Deep South Conference (DSC) was an NCAA Division II men's lacrosse-only college athletic conference that operated in the Southeastern United States. It was founded in 1993 in advance of the 1994 NCAA lacrosse season, and expanded over time to as many as 10 schools. The conference dissolved after the 2013 lacrosse season.

== History ==
The conference began in 1994 as the Deep South League with five inaugural members Catawba, Greensboro, Limestone, Pfeiffer, and Virginia Tech. In 1995 Greensboro and Virginia Tech left the conference and it added St. Andrews. In 1997 the DSC added Wingate and Lees-McRae in 1999 Mars Hill became the seventh member of the conference. In 2004 Queens joined the Deep South followed by Belmont Abbey and Presbyterian a few seasons later in 2006. In 2006 the conference saw its largest membership, with ten member schools. Following the 2006 season, Conference Carolinas began sponsoring men's lacrosse, causing several members to leave the Deep South. In 2009 Florida Southern joined the Deep South Conference and in 2011 Lenoir-Rhyne began sponsoring lacrosse and joined the DSC. The conference continued expansion in 2012, adding Florida Tech and the University of Tampa, bringing the conference to nine members.

However, the continued growth of the sport soon led to the conference's demise. On July 3, 2012, the South Atlantic Conference, the all-sports home of four DSC members, announced that it would begin sponsoring four new sports, including men's lacrosse, in the 2013–14 school year (2014 lacrosse season). The sponsorship of men's lacrosse was made possible when Coker College, which already sponsored men's lacrosse, and former DSC member Queens were confirmed as new SAC members for 2013–14. This brought the number of SAC men's lacrosse schools to six. Five months later on December 6, the Sunshine State Conference, home to the other five DSC members, announced that it would also sponsor men's lacrosse in the 2014 season. This followed the announcement by another SSC member, Lynn University, that it would start sponsoring the sport in that season. These moves meant that the 2013 season would be the last for the DSC.

== Final members ==
All of the final members of the conference are private schools that now play men's lacrosse in their all-sports leagues.

Institution	Location	Affiliation	Enrollment	Nickname	Primary conference
Catawba College	Salisbury, North Carolina	United Church of Christ	1,358	Indians	South Atlantic Conference
Florida Southern College	Lakeland, Florida	Methodist	2,426	Moccasins	Sunshine State Conference
Florida Institute of Technology	Melbourne, Florida	Nonsectarian	8,985	Panthers	Sunshine State Conference
Lenoir–Rhyne University	Hickory, North Carolina	Lutheran (ELCA)	1,674	Bears	South Atlantic Conference
Mars Hill College	Mars Hill, North Carolina	Baptist	1,237	Lions	South Atlantic Conference
Rollins College	Winter Park, Florida	Congregationalists	3,294	Tars	Sunshine State Conference
Saint Leo University	Saint Leo, Florida	Catholic	14,339	Lions	Sunshine State Conference
University of Tampa	Tampa, Florida	Nonsectarian	10,515	Spartans	Sunshine State Conference
Wingate University	Wingate, North Carolina	Baptist	2,163	Bulldogs	South Atlantic Conference

== Former members ==
- Greensboro College (1994-1995) NCAA Division III Independent
- Virginia Tech (1994-1995) MCLA Division I SouthEastern Lacrosse Conference
- Limestone University (1994-2006) Conference Carolinas
- Pfeiffer University (1994-2006) — Initially moved to Conference Carolinas; later moved to the NCAA Division III USA South Athletic Conference
- St. Andrews Presbyterian College (1995-2006) Conference Carolinas

Regis University (1997-2000)

- Lees–McRae College (1997-2006) Conference Carolinas
- Queens University of Charlotte (2004-2006) Conference Carolinas
- Belmont Abbey College (2006) Conference Carolinas
- Presbyterian College (2006-2007) NCAA Division I Independent; later dropped the sport

== National Championship ==
=== National Championships ===
- Limestone - 2000, 2002

=== Appearances ===
- Limestone - 2000, 2001, 2002, 2003, 2004, 2005

== See also ==
- College lacrosse
