= GLAAD 20 Under 20 =

Annual list recognizing young professionals

- Current: 2025 GLAAD 20 Under 20
- Awarded for: Celebrating and spotlighting the next generation of LGBTQ leaders
- Sponsored by: Teen Vogue; Google; UGG; Shutterfly; Delta Air Lines; Hyundai; M&M's; Live Nation; The Recording Academy
- Date: June 22, 2020
- First award: 2020

Television/radio coverage
- Network: GLAAD

GLAAD 20 Under 20 is an annual list published by the Gay & Lesbian Alliance Against Defamation (GLAAD), recognizing 20 LGBTQ+ young people under the age of 20 who have made significant contributions to advancing acceptance, visibility, and inclusion of the LGBTQ+ community.

The list celebrates individuals from various fields, including activism, entertainment, advocacy and social media highlighting their efforts to inspire change and promote equality for LGBTQ+ youth.

== History ==
The GLAAD 20 Under 20 list was introduced in June 2020 to recognize young LGBTQ+ individuals under 20 who have made significant contributions to LGBTQ+ visibility and advocacy. The initiative highlights the growing influence of LGBTQ+ youth in activism, entertainment and social media.

Over time, it has expanded to include a diverse range of honorees, from activists to celebrities, who use their platforms to promote equality and inclusion. The list is chosen annually by a panel of GLAAD staff and LGBTQ+ leaders, typically announced during Pride Month to celebrate LGBTQ+ identities and progress.

== Year lists ==
- 2020 GLAAD 20 Under 20
- 2021 GLAAD 20 Under 20
- 2022 GLAAD 20 Under 20
- 2023 GLAAD 20 Under 20
- 2024 GLAAD 20 Under 20
- 2025 GLAAD 20 Under 20

== See also ==
- Fortune's 40 Under 40
- WEF's Young Global Leaders
- Forbes Magazine's 30 Under 30
- MIT's Innovators Under 35
- The Business Journal's Forty Under 40
- Capital's Top 40 Under 40
