= California's 45th congressional district =

U.S. House district for California

Coordinates: 33°42′51″N 117°40′06″W

- Interactive map of district boundaries
- Representative: Derek Tran; D–Orange
- Population (2025): 747,591
- Median household income: $116,878
- Ethnicity: 38.4% Asian; 30.0% Hispanic; 25.2% White; 3.3% Two or more races; 2.1% Black; 0.9% other
- Cook PVI: D+1

California's 45th congressional district is a congressional district in the U.S. state of California currently represented by Democrat Derek Tran.

The 45th district was created as a result of the redistricting cycle after the 1980 census.

The district is based in Orange and Los Angeles counties and includes all of Garden Grove, Westminster, Cerritos, Buena Park, Placentia, Hawaiian Gardens, Cypress, Fountain Valley, Artesia, Los Alamitos, Rossmoor, and La Palma, as well as parts of Brea, Lakewood, and Fullerton.

In 2018, incumbent Representative Mimi Walters competed against a field of four Democrats and an independent candidate in the primary election for the 2018 midterm elections. On February 25, 2018, UC Irvine (UCI) assistant law professor Dave Min received the endorsement of the California Democratic Party.

Min, former White House senior technology advisor Brian Forde, former legislative assistant to Sherrod Brown (D-OH) Kia Hamadanchy, UCI law professor Katie Porter, and UCI business professor John Graham ran in the "top two" primary in June 2018. Walters and Porter placed first and second and advanced to the general election in November.

On November 14, 2018, eight days after polls closed, Dave Wasserman, then the House Editor for The Cook Political Report, projected that Porter had won the general election.

In 2024, the election in this district was one of the state's most competitive. In its current form after the 2020 redistricting, the district has a significant presence of Asian-American voters.

== Recent election results from statewide races ==
Year	Office	Results
2008	President	McCain 52% - 48%
2010	Governor	Whitman 54% - 40%
2010	Lt. Governor	Maldonado 47% - 38%
2010	Secretary of State	Dunn 50% - 41%
2010	Attorney General	Cooley 59% - 32%
2010	Treasurer	Walters 48% - 44%
2010	Controller	Strickland 50% - 41%
2012	President	Romney 49.1% - 48.7%
2014	Governor	Kashkari 53% - 47%
2016	President	Clinton 54% - 41%
2018	Governor	Newsom 50.4% - 49.6%
2018	Attorney General	Becerra 52% - 48%
2020	President	Biden 52% - 46%
2022	Senate (Reg.)	Meuser 51% - 49%
2022	Governor	Dahle 51% - 49%
2022	Lt. Governor	Underwood Jacobs 51% - 49%
2022	Secretary of State	Bernosky 51% - 49%
2022	Attorney General	Hochman 52% - 48%
2022	Treasurer	Guerrero 53% - 47%
2022	Controller	Chen 54% - 46%
2024	President	Harris 49% - 48%
2024	Senate (Reg.)	Garvey 50.5% - 49.5%

== Composition ==
FIPS County Code	County	Seat	Population
37	Los Angeles	Los Angeles	9,663,345
59	Orange	Santa Ana	3,135,755

Under the 2020 redistricting, California's 45th congressional district is located in Southern California, taking up western Orange County and east Los Angeles County. The area in Orange County includes the cities of Cypress, Brea, Placentia, Westminster, Garden Grove, Buena Park, Fountain Valley, Los Alamitos, La Palma, and northern Fullerton, part of Yorba Linda; and the census-designated places Rossmoor and Midway City. The area in Los Angeles County includes the cities of Cerritos, Artesia, Hawaiian Gardens, and part of Lakewood.

Orange County is split between this district, the 40th district, the 46th district, and the 47th district. The 45th and 40th are partitioned by Orange Freeway, E Lambert Rd, Sunrise Rd, Foothill Ln, Wandering Ln, N Associated Rd, E Birch St, S Valencia Ave, La Plaza Dr, La Floresta Dr, La Crescenta Dr, Highway 90, 1053 E Imperial Highway-343 Tolbert St, Vesuvius Dr, Rose Dr, Wabash Ave, 6th St, Golden Ave, Carbon Canyon Creek, E Yorba Linda Blvd, Jefferson St, 1401 Zion Ave-N Van Buren St, Buena Vista Ave, 17225 Orange Blossom Ln-1480 E Howard Pl, 17511 Pine Cir-Orchard Dr, Mariposa Ave, Lakeview Ave, E Miraloma Ave, Fee-Ana St, Sierra Madre Cir, E Orangethorpe Ave, Burlington Northern Santa Fe Railroad, Kensington Ave, N Kraemer Blvd, Carbon Creek, and E La Jolla St.

The 45th and 46th are partitioned by Santa Ana River, W Lehnhardt Ave, Gloxinia Ave, Lilac Way, Edinger Ave, Pebble Ct, 10744 W Lehnhardt Ave-10726 Kedge Ave, 724 S Sail St-5641 W Barbette Ave-407 S Starboard St, Starboard St/S Cooper St, Taft St, Hazard Ave, N Euclid St, Westminster Ave, Clinton St, 14300 Clinton St-1001 Mar Les Dr, Mar Les Dr, 2729 Huckleberry Rd, N Fairview St, Fairview St, 13462 Garden Grove Blvd-13252 Marty Ln, Townley St/Siemon Ave, W Garden Grove Blvd, S Lewis St, W Chapman Ave, E Simmons Ave, S Haster St, Ascot Dr, W Orangewood Ave, S 9th St, 2209 S Waverly Dr-11751 S Waverly Dr, Euclid St, Haven Ln, W Dudley Ave, S Euclid St, Katella Ave, Dale St, Rancho Alamitos High School, Orangewood Ave, Barber City Channel, Arrowhead St, Del Rey Dr, Westcliff Dr, Lampson Ave, Fern St, Garden Glove Blvd, Union Pacific Railroad, 7772 W Chapman Ave-Bently Ave, Highway 39, Western Ave, Stanton Storm Channel, Knott Ave, 6970 Via Kannela-6555 Katella Ave, Cerritos Ave, 10490 Carlotta Ave-Ball Rd, John Beat Park, S Knott Ave, Solano Dr, Monterra Way, Campesina Dr, Holder Elementary School, W Orange Ave, 6698 Via Riverside Way-Orangeview Junior High School, W Lincoln Ave, 195 N Western Ave-298 N Western Ave, 3181 W Coolidge Ave-405 N Dale St, W Crescent Ave, N La Reina St, W La Palma Ave, Boisseranc Park, I-5 HOV Lane, Orangethorpe Ave, Fullerton Creek, Whitaker St, Commonwealth Ave, Los Angeles County Metro, W Malvern Ave, W Chapman Ave, E Chapman Ave, S Placentia Ave, Kimberly Ave, E Orangethorpe Ave, and 2500 E Terrace St-Highway 57.

The 45th and 47th are partitioned by Highway 405, Old Ranch Parkway, Seal Beach Blvd, St Cloud Dr, Montecito Rd, Rossmoor Center Way, 12240 Seal Beach Blvd-Los Alamitos Army Airfield, Bolsa Chica Channel, Rancho Rd, Harold Pl, Springdale St, 6021 Anacapa Dr-Willow Ln, Edward St, Bolsa Ave, Goldenwest St, McFadden Ave, Union Pacific Railroad, 15241 Cascade Ln-15241 Cedarwood Ave, Highway 39, Edinger Ave, Newland St, Heil Ave, Magnolia St, Warner Ave, Garfield Ave, and the Santa Ana River.

Los Angeles County is split between this district, the 38th district, and the 42nd district. The 45th and 42nd are partitioned by San Gabriel River, Palo Verde Ave, South St, Del Amo Blvd, Pioneer Blvd, Coyote Creek, Centralia Creek, Hawaiian Ave, Verne Ave, Bloomfield Park, Highway 605, 226th St, Dorado Cir, Cortner Ave, E Woodson St, Bloomfield Ave, Lilly Ave, Marna Ave, and Los Alamos Channel.

The 45th and 38th are partitioned by Valley View Ave, Southern Pacific Railroad, Alondra Blvd, 15917 Canyon Creek Rd-12371 Hermosura St, Norwalk Blvd, 166th St, and Cerritos College Child Development-Alondra Blvd.

=== Cities and CDPs with 10,000 or more people ===
- Garden Grove – 171,949
- Fullerton – 143,617
- Westminster – 90,911
- Buena Park – 84,034
- Lakewood – 82,496
- Yorba Linda – 68,336
- Fountain Valley – 57,047
- Placentia – 51,824
- Cypress – 50,151
- Cerritos – 49,578
- Brea – 47,325
- Artesia – 16,395
- La Palma – 15,581
- Hawaiian Gardens – 13,593
- Los Alamitos – 11,780
- Rossmoor – 10,625

=== 2,500 – 10,000 people ===
- Midway City – 8,825

== List of members representing the district ==
Member	Party	Dates	Cong ress(es)	Electoral history	Counties
District created January 3, 1983
Duncan Hunter (Coronado)	Republican	January 3, 1983 – January 3, 1993	98th 99th 100th 101st 102nd	Redistricted from the 42nd district and re-elected in 1982. Re-elected in 1984. Re-elected in 1986. Re-elected in 1988. Re-elected in 1990. Redistricted to the 52nd district.	1983–1993; Imperial, San Diego
Dana Rohrabacher (Huntington Beach)	Republican	January 3, 1993 – January 3, 2003	103rd 104th 105th 106th 107th	Redistricted from the 42nd district and re-elected in 1992. Re-elected in 1994. Re-elected in 1996. Re-elected in 1998. Re-elected in 2000. Redistricted to the 46th district.	1993–2003; Orange
Mary Bono (Palm Springs)	Republican	January 3, 2003 – January 3, 2013	108th 109th 110th 111th 112th	Redistricted from the 44th district and re-elected in 2002. Re-elected in 2004. Re-elected in 2006. Re-elected in 2008. Re-elected in 2010. Redistricted to the 36th district and lost re-election.	2003–2013 Riverside
John Campbell (Irvine)	Republican	January 3, 2013 – January 3, 2015	113th	Redistricted from the 48th district and re-elected in 2012. Retired.	2013–2023 Orange
Mimi Walters (Irvine)	Republican	January 3, 2015 – January 3, 2019	114th 115th	Elected in 2014. Re-elected in 2016. Lost re-election.	2013–2023 Orange
Katie Porter (Irvine)	Democratic	January 3, 2019 – January 3, 2023	116th 117th	Elected in 2018. Re-elected in 2020. Redistricted to the 47th district.	2013–2023 Orange
Michelle Steel (Seal Beach)	Republican	January 3, 2023 – January 3, 2025	118th	Redistricted from the 48th district and re-elected in 2022. Lost re-election.	2023–present: Orange, Los Angeles
Derek Tran (Orange)	Democratic	January 3, 2025– present	119th	Elected in 2024. Re-elected in 2026.	2023–present: Orange, Los Angeles

== Election results ==
=== 1982 ===
1982 United States House of Representatives elections in California
Party	Candidate	Votes	%
Republican	Duncan Hunter (Incumbent)	117,771	68.6
Democratic	Richard Hill	50,148	29.2
Libertarian	Jack R. Sanders	3,839	2.2
Total votes		171,758	100.0
Republican hold			

=== 1984 ===
1984 United States House of Representatives elections in California
Party	Candidate	Votes	%
Republican	Duncan Hunter (Incumbent)	149,011	75.1
Democratic	David W. Guthrie	45,325	22.9
Libertarian	Patrick "Pat" Wright	3,971	2.0
Total votes		198,307	100.0
Republican hold			

=== 1986 ===
1986 United States House of Representatives elections in California
Party	Candidate	Votes	%
Republican	Duncan Hunter (Incumbent)	118,900	58.1
Democratic	Hewitt Fitts Ryan	82,800	40.5
Libertarian	Lee Schwartz	2,975	1.4
Total votes		204,675	100.0
Republican hold			

=== 1988 ===
1988 United States House of Representatives elections in California
Party	Candidate	Votes	%
Republican	Duncan Hunter (Incumbent)	166,451	74.0
Democratic	Pete Lepiscopo	54,012	24.0
Libertarian	Perry Willis	4,440	2.0
Total votes		224,903	100.0
Republican hold			

=== 1990 ===
1990 United States House of Representatives elections in California
Party	Candidate	Votes	%
Republican	Duncan Hunter (Incumbent)	123,591	72.8
Libertarian	Joe Shea	46,068	27.2
Total votes		169,659	100.0
Republican hold			

=== 1992 ===
1992 United States House of Representatives elections in California
Party	Candidate	Votes	%
Republican	Dana Rohrabacher (Incumbent)	123,731	54.5
Democratic	Patricia "Pat" McCabe	88,508	39.0
Libertarian	Gary David Copeland	14,777	6.5
Total votes		227,016	100.0
Republican hold			

=== 1994 ===
1994 United States House of Representatives elections in California
Party	Candidate	Votes	%
Republican	Dana Rohrabacher (Incumbent)	124,875	69.1
Democratic	Brett Williamson	55,849	30.9
Total votes		180,724	100.0
Republican hold			

=== 1996 ===
1996 United States House of Representatives elections in California
Party	Candidate	Votes	%
Republican	Dana Rohrabacher (Incumbent)	125,326	61.0
Democratic	Sally Alexander	68,312	33.2
Libertarian	Mark Murphy	8,813	4.3
Natural Law	Rand McDevitt	3,071	1.5
Total votes		205,522	100.0
Republican hold			

=== 1998 ===
1998 United States House of Representatives elections in California
Party	Candidate	Votes	%
Republican	Dana Rohrabacher (Incumbent)	94,296	58.7
Democratic	Patricia W. Neal	60,022	37.3
Libertarian	Don Hull	4,337	2.7
Natural Law	William "Bill" Verkamp Jr.	2,115	1.3
Total votes		160,770	100.0
Republican hold			

=== 2000 ===
2000 United States House of Representatives elections in California
Party	Candidate	Votes	%
Republican	Dana Rohrabacher (Incumbent)	136,275	62.2
Democratic	Ted Crisell	71,066	32.4
Libertarian	Don Hull	8,409	3.8
Natural Law	Constance Betton	3,635	1.6
Total votes		219,385	100.0
Republican hold			

=== 2002 ===
2002 United States House of Representatives elections in California
Party	Candidate	Votes	%
Republican	Mary Bono (Incumbent)	87,101	65.3
Democratic	Elle K. Kurplewski	43,692	32.7
Libertarian	Rod Miller-Boyer	2,740	2.0
Total votes		133,533	100.0
Republican hold			

=== 2004 ===
2004 United States House of Representatives elections in California
Party	Candidate	Votes	%
Republican	Mary Bono (Incumbent)	153,523	66.7
Democratic	Richard J. Meyer	76,967	33.3
Total votes		230,490	100.0
Republican hold			

=== 2006 ===
2006 United States House of Representatives elections in California
Party	Candidate	Votes	%
Republican	Mary Bono (Incumbent)	99,638	60.7
Democratic	David Roth	64,613	39.3
Total votes		164,251	100.0
Republican hold			

=== 2008 ===
2008 United States House of Representatives elections in California
Party	Candidate	Votes	%
Republican	Mary Bono (Incumbent)	155,166	58.3
Democratic	Julie Bornstein	111,026	41.7
Total votes		266,192	100.0
Turnout			74.4
Republican hold			

=== 2010 ===
2010 United States House of Representatives elections in California
Party	Candidate	Votes	%
Republican	Mary Bono (Incumbent)	106,472	51.5
Democratic	Steve Pougnet	87,141	42.1
American Independent	Bill Lussenheide	13,188	6.4
Total votes		206,801	100.0
Turnout			60.5
Republican hold			

=== 2012 ===
2012 United States House of Representatives elections in California
Party	Candidate	Votes	%
Republican	John Campbell (Incumbent)	171,417	58.5
Democratic	Sukhee Kang	121,814	41.5
Total votes		293,231	100.0
Republican hold			

=== 2014 ===
2014 United States House of Representatives elections in California
Party	Candidate	Votes	%
Republican	Mimi Walters	106,083	65.1
Democratic	Drew E. Leavens	56,819	34.9
Total votes		162,902	100.0
Republican hold			

=== 2016 ===
2016 United States House of Representatives elections in California
Party	Candidate	Votes	%
Republican	Mimi Walters (Incumbent)	182,408	58.6
Democratic	Ron Varasteh	128,996	41.4
Total votes		311,404	100.0
Republican hold			

=== 2018 ===
2018 United States House of Representatives elections in California
Party	Candidate	Votes	%
Democratic	Katie Porter	158,906	52.1
Republican	Mimi Walters (Incumbent)	146,383	47.9
Total votes		305,289	100.0
Democratic gain from Republican			

=== 2020 ===
2020 United States House of Representatives elections in California
Party	Candidate	Votes	%
Democratic	Katie Porter (Incumbent)	221,843	53.5
Republican	Greg Raths	193,096	46.5
Total votes		414,939	100.0
Democratic hold			

=== 2022 ===
2022 United States House of Representatives elections in California
Party	Candidate	Votes	%
Republican	Michelle Steel (Incumbent)	113,960	52.4
Democratic	Jay Chen	103,466	47.6
Total votes		217,426	100.0
Republican hold			

=== 2024 ===
2024 United States House of Representatives elections in California
Party	Candidate	Votes	%
Democratic	Derek Tran	158,104	50.1
Republican	Michelle Steel (Incumbent)	157,508	49.9
Total votes		315,612	100.0
Democratic gain from Republican			

== Historical district boundaries ==
=== 2003-13 ===
From 2003 to 2013, this district was based in Riverside County. The district included the communities of Palm Springs, Moreno Valley, Palm Desert, Hemet, Cathedral City, Temecula, Blythe, Rancho Mirage, Murrieta, Indio, Indian Wells, La Quinta, Cabazon, Anza, Thermal, Idyllwild, Coachella, and other unincorporated areas of Riverside County.

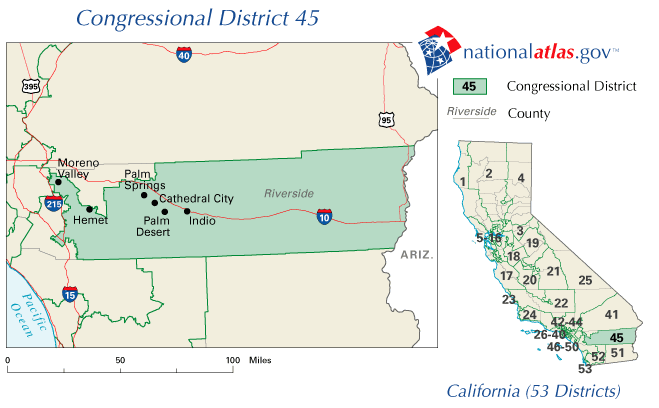

=== 2013-23 ===
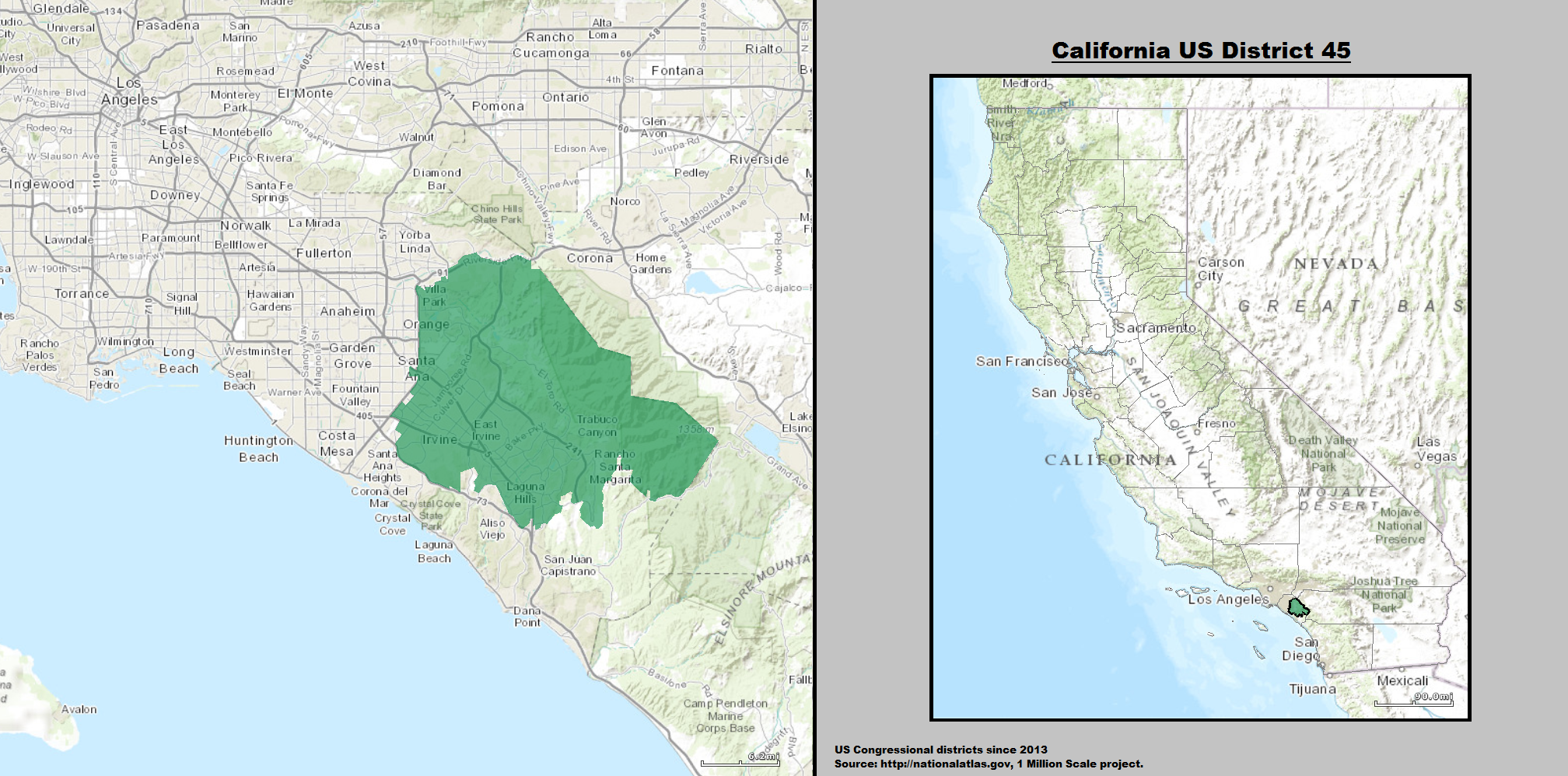

== See also ==
- List of United States congressional districts
- California's congressional districts
