= Olivia Julianna =

American political activist (born 2002)

Olivia Julianna Herrera
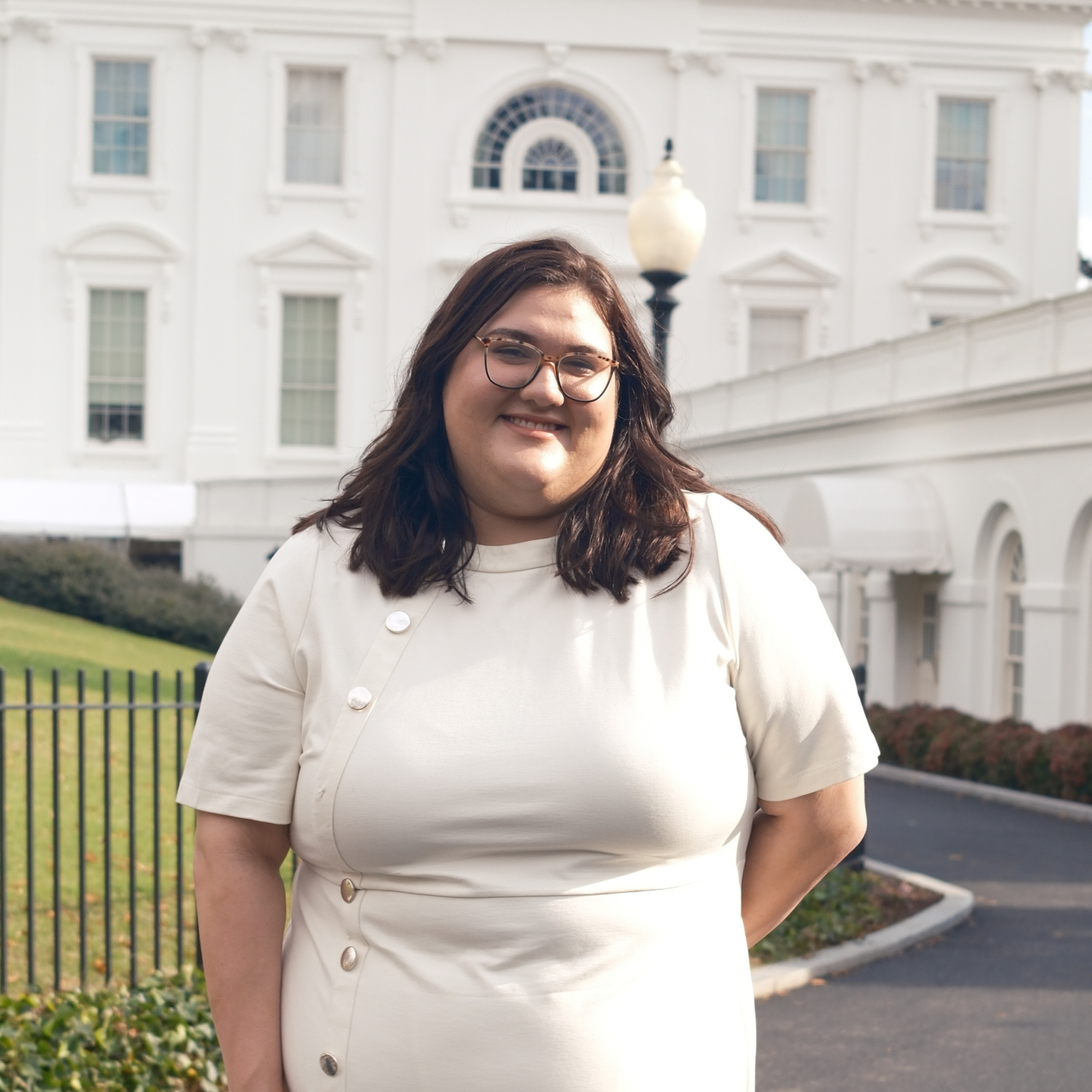
- Born: November 17, 2002 (age 23); Texas, U.S.
- Education: University of Houston–Victoria
- Occupations: Political strategist; activist
- Political party: Democratic
- Honors: Bloomberg 50 Most Influential

Instagram information
- Page: 0liviajulianna
- Followers: 177,000

Substack information
- Newsletter: A New Perspective
- Topics: U.S. politics, current events, analysis
- Subscribers: 155,000

TikTok information
- Page: 0liviajulianna
- Followers: 754,000

X information
- Handle: @0liviajulianna
- Followers: 323,000
- Last updated: July 22, 2026

Olivia Julianna Herrera (/ˌxuːliˈɑːnə/; born November 17, 2002) is an American political activist, abortion rights advocate, and political strategist from Texas. She was formerly the director of politics and government affairs for Gen-Z for Change, a nonprofit organization focused on civic engagement among Generation Z. Herrera has maintained a large social media presence to encourage civic participation, especially on issues such as abortion rights, climate change, and LGBTQ+ advocacy. She was named one of the 50 Most Influential People of 2022 by Bloomberg Media.

== Early life and education ==
Herrera was born and raised in Texas and resides in Houston. For safety reasons, she publicly uses her first and middle names. She is a fourth-generation Texan of Mexican-American descent. She is a first-generation college student attending the Texas A&M University–Victoria, where she majors in political science.

== Career and activism ==
Herrera began posting political content during the 2020 United States presidential election. She gained widespread attention in 2021 when she encouraged people to submit false reports to a Texas Right to Life whistleblower site that enabled anonymous reporting of abortions under the Texas Heartbeat Act. The site was overwhelmed and eventually taken down.

In July 2022, Representative Matt Gaetz mocked Herrera’s appearance during remarks at a Turning Point USA summit. In response, she launched a fundraising campaign that raised over $2 million for abortion funds across the country.

=== Gen-Z for Change ===
Herrera joined Gen-Z for Change in 2021 and was named Director of Politics and Government Affairs in October 2022. She helped oversee political strategy and youth civic campaigns. She left the organization in August 2023.

=== 2024 election and beyond ===
During the 2024 presidential cycle, Herrera mobilized Gen-Z voters in support of Vice President Kamala Harris, appearing in national media and at the Democratic National Convention. In February 2025, she announced that she would step back from formal campaign organizing to focus on systemic issues within the Democratic Party and speak more freely as an outside voice. She launched a newsletter and continues to write and comment on progressive politics and youth engagement.

Herrera is a member of the Chorus Creator Incubator Program, a program launched in the wake of the 2024 presidential election to build a progressive creator's ecosystem.

== Recognition ==
In December 2022, Bloomberg Media named Herrera one of the 50 Most Influential People in the world. She also attended the 2023 State of the Union Address as a guest of Representative Nanette Barragán and confronted Rep. Gaetz at the event.
