= Danielle Cohn =

Internet celebrity

Danielle Haleigh Cohn
- Born: March 7, 2006 (age 20); Florida, U.S.
- Occupations: Social media personality, singer, model
- Years active: 2015–present
- Known for: TikTok, Musical.ly stardom; singles “Marilyn Monroe”

Danielle Haleigh Cohn (born March 7, 2006 (Note: Cohn's father released her birth certificate showing this date; she has previously claimed she was born in 2004.)) is an American social media personality, singer, and model, who rose to fame via Musical.ly (now TikTok).

== Early life ==
Born in Florida to Jennifer Archambault and Dustin Cohn, she has one older brother, Chad. She earned the title Miss Florida Jr. Preteen Queen in 2015.

== Career ==
Cohn began posting lip-sync videos on Musical.ly in 2016, quickly amassing over 10 million followers. By mid-2025, her TikTok following reached 18 million.

Her debut single “Marilyn Monroe” was released in May 2017, followed by “Fix Your Heart”, “Little Like Paradise”, and “Hate on the Summer”. She was nominated for a Teen Choice Award Choice Muser in 2017.

== Age dispute ==
Cohn claims she was born in 2004, but in 2019 her father publicly shared a birth certificate indicating 2006. In 2020, she appeared to confirm being 14 during an Instagram Live.

== Awards and nominations ==
- Teen Choice Award nominee – Choice Muser (2017)
