= Jack Petocz =

American student activist (born 2004)

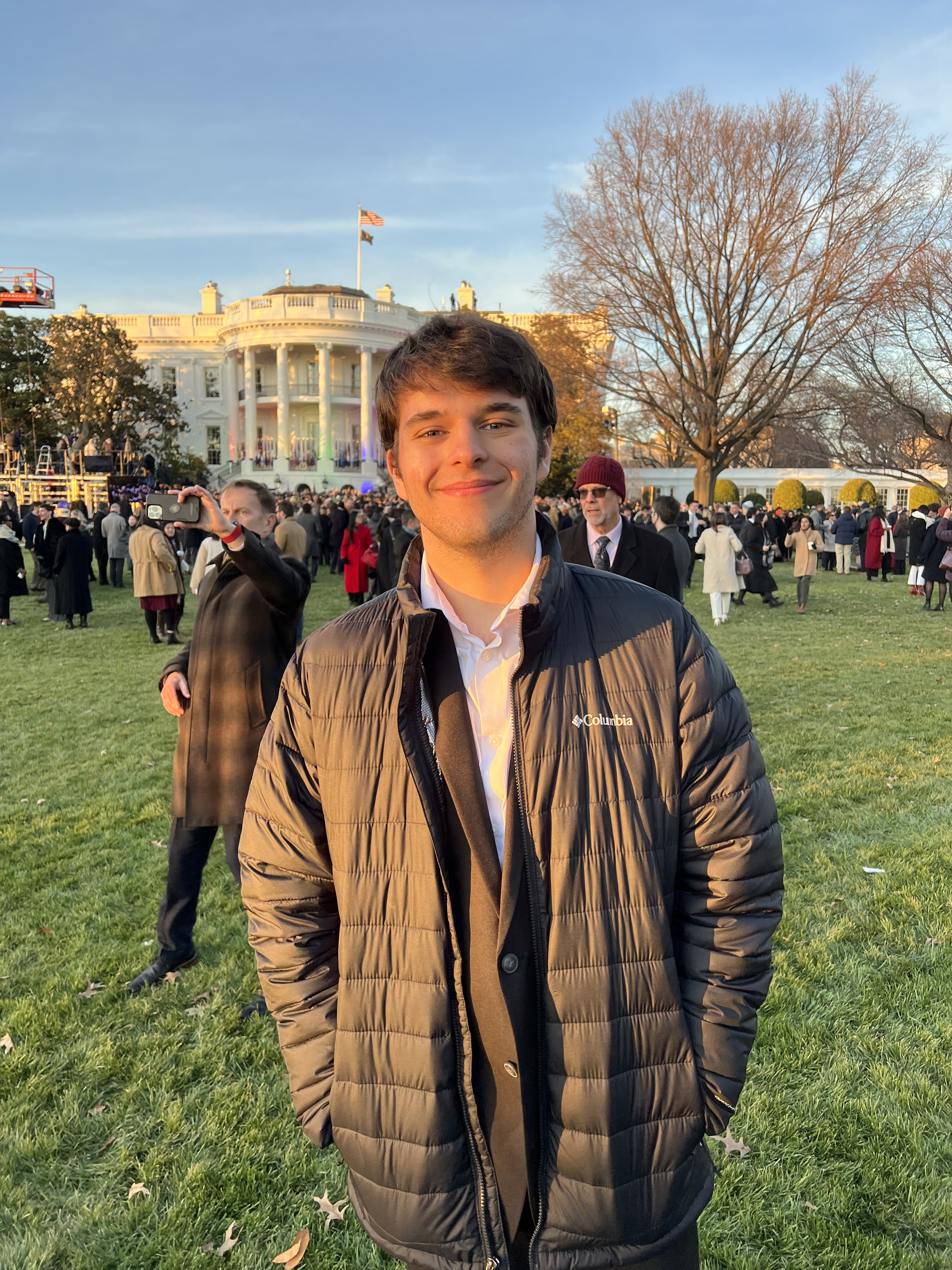
- Petocz in 2022
- Born: September 8, 2004 (age 21)
- Education: Flagler Palm Coast High School; Vanderbilt University
- Occupation: Activist
- Organization(s): Gen-Z for Change, Recall FCSB
- Known for: LGBTQ+ Activism
- Awards: Webby Awards Social Movement of the Year, PEN America/Benenson Courage Award, Bob Stevenson Civil Libertarian of the Year Award, Anti-Defamation League Kay Family Award

Jack Petocz (born September 8, 2004) is an American activist and advocate for LGBTQ+ rights.. He is the founder of Recall FCSB, the co-founder of the Florida Youth Action Fund, and the Director of Partnerships with the nonprofit organization Gen-Z for Change. He is gay and speaks about his experiences as an LGBTQ+ person.

As an activist, Petocz has opposed public school policies in Florida related to book bans, dress codes, and the "Don't Say Gay" law. His activism and writing about LGBTQ+ rights has been featured in FlaglerLive, The New York Times, and MSNBC.

== Early life and education ==
Petocz was born on September 8, 2004. He attended Rymfire Elementary School, Indian Trails Middle School, and Flagler Palm Coast High School.

On August 23, 2021, in an op-ed with Flagler Live, Petocz voiced his opinion on the school district's dress code policy and brought attention to a petition to have it changed. He stated that the dress code stripped students of all individuality and expression, adding that female students were particularly adversely affected.

== Activism ==
=== Book bans in schools ===
In November 2021, Petocz organized a protest challenging the Flagler County School Board for a book ban which called to remove books about LGBTQ+ characters and racism in the classroom.

Petocz, the only student in recent memory that a school board member censored as he was addressing the board, mobilized a protest after Board member Jill Woolbright filed a challenge to four titles in school libraries. The challenge caused the titles to be removed from circulation. Woolbright in a criminal complaint filed with the Flagler County Sheriff's Office and later in statements at school board meetings declared one of the circulation titles as criminal because of its sexual themes. Woolbright was supported by Board member Janet McDonald (the board member who had censored Petocz), who used similar language to describe some of the books in question, especially George Johnson All Boys Aren't Blue, a memoir of growing up Black and queer.

Petocz was featured in The New York Times for organizing the protest against the Flagler County School Board for banning Johnson's book from school libraries. In the article, Petocz said that as a gay student himself, books like All Boys Aren't Blue are critical for youth. He highlighted that it felt discriminatory against the LGBTQ+ community and books that don't have his community's representation are rarely challenged.

In an MSNBC interview with Katy Tur, Petocz stated that LGBTQ+ communities are further marginalized by school boards that police education, and the efforts to remove these books from the classroom is an attempt to erase identities as a whole.

=== Recall FCSB ===
After being silenced at meetings, Petocz founded Recall FCSB. The group is a student-led organization working toward empowering youth to act and vote against bigotry which they believe to be rampant within the Flagler County School Board. Its social media accounts were created on November 11, 2021.

=== Student walkout protest of the "Don't Say Gay" bill ===
On March 3, 2022, at age 17, Petocz planned a pre-approved rally and "Say Gay" walkout at Flagler Palm Coast High School in opposition to the "Don't Say Gay" bill. Over 500 of the school's students attended the protest as well as thousands of others statewide. The law, HB 1557, officially entitled "Parental Rights in Education," prohibits discussion of gender identity and sexual orientation in public classrooms in kindergarten through third grade and only when age-appropriate in higher grades.

Petocz obtained administrative permission to host the walkout but was later suspended for his actions as leader of the rally when he distributed pride flags which school officials said violated the school's code of conduct. A change.org petition to overturn Petocz's administrative removal resulted in over 7,000 signatures when Principal Greg Schwartz elected to rescind the suspension.

Petocz then wrote a letter to Governor Ron DeSantis in response to the bill's progression, requesting a meeting to discuss the potential impact of the GOP legislation and agenda.

=== Vanderbilt University ===
As a first-year student at Vanderbilt University, Petocz participated in a sit-in protest at Kirkland Hall over the students' ability to vote on the adoption of a Boycott, Divestment and Sanctions amendment to the constitution of the student government. As the sit-in was broken up by university police on March 27, 2024, Petocz was arrested. He was one of three students charged with assault and bodily injury to another following an incident with a Vanderbilt University police officer. Following a preliminary hearing by the university, he was among three students to be expelled.

== Personal life ==
Petocz is openly gay. He is a participant at PEN America's Free Speech Advocacy Institute and was a recipient of the PEN America/Benenson Freedom of Expression Courage Award in 2022.
