= Aidan Kohn-Murphy =

American political activist (born 2004)

- Kohn-Murphy in 2026
- Born: January 1, 2004 (age 22)
- Education: Harvard University
- Alma mater: Georgetown Day School
- Occupation: Political activist
- Organization: Gen-Z for Change
- Known for: Founder of Gen-Z for Change

Aidan Kohn-Murphy (born January 1, 2004) is an American social media content creator and political activist. He is the founder of Gen-Z for Change, a non-profit advocacy organization that uses social media to promote civil discourse and political action among members of Generation Z.

== Activism ==
Gen-Z for Change began in 2020 with Kohn-Murphy creating the TikTok account "TikTok for Biden" to support the presidential bid of Joe Biden. As of August 2022 it is a registered 501(c)(4) organisation with a core team of 15–20 people and a coalition of over 500 content creators and activists, which together have 540 million followers and receive 1.5 billion monthly views on social media. It has been the subject of significant news coverage, especially after coordinating a one-hour briefing with the White House for 30 prominent TikTok content creators about the United States’ strategic goals regarding the Russian invasion of Ukraine, which was parodied by Saturday Night Live.

Kohn-Murphy himself is featured prominently in this coverage, in part because of his young age (he was 16 when he created the TikTok for Biden account). Many articles characterise him as politically precocious, and the first news coverage of his political activism is a 2011 Washington Post article about then-seven-year-old Kohn-Murphy's testimony before a D. C. Council Committee of the Whole, Youth Issues hearing, against the ban of chocolate milk in Washington, D.C.'s public schools. Kohn-Murphy was also interviewed by The New York Times in 2022 as president of the Georgetown Day School's Student Staff Council regarding controversy over anti-racism teaching in schools, unrelated to his work with Gen-Z for Change.

== Personal life ==
Kohn-Murphy lives in Washington, D.C. He is gay.

A biographical article on Kohn-Murphy partly attributes his activism and prominence to his parents' political savvy; his mother directs the legal clinics at George Washington University, and his father served as a former D.C. Mayor’s chief of staff and is Georgetown University’s vice president for government relations and community engagement.
