= Political views of Generation Z =

Politics of those born from 1997 to 2012

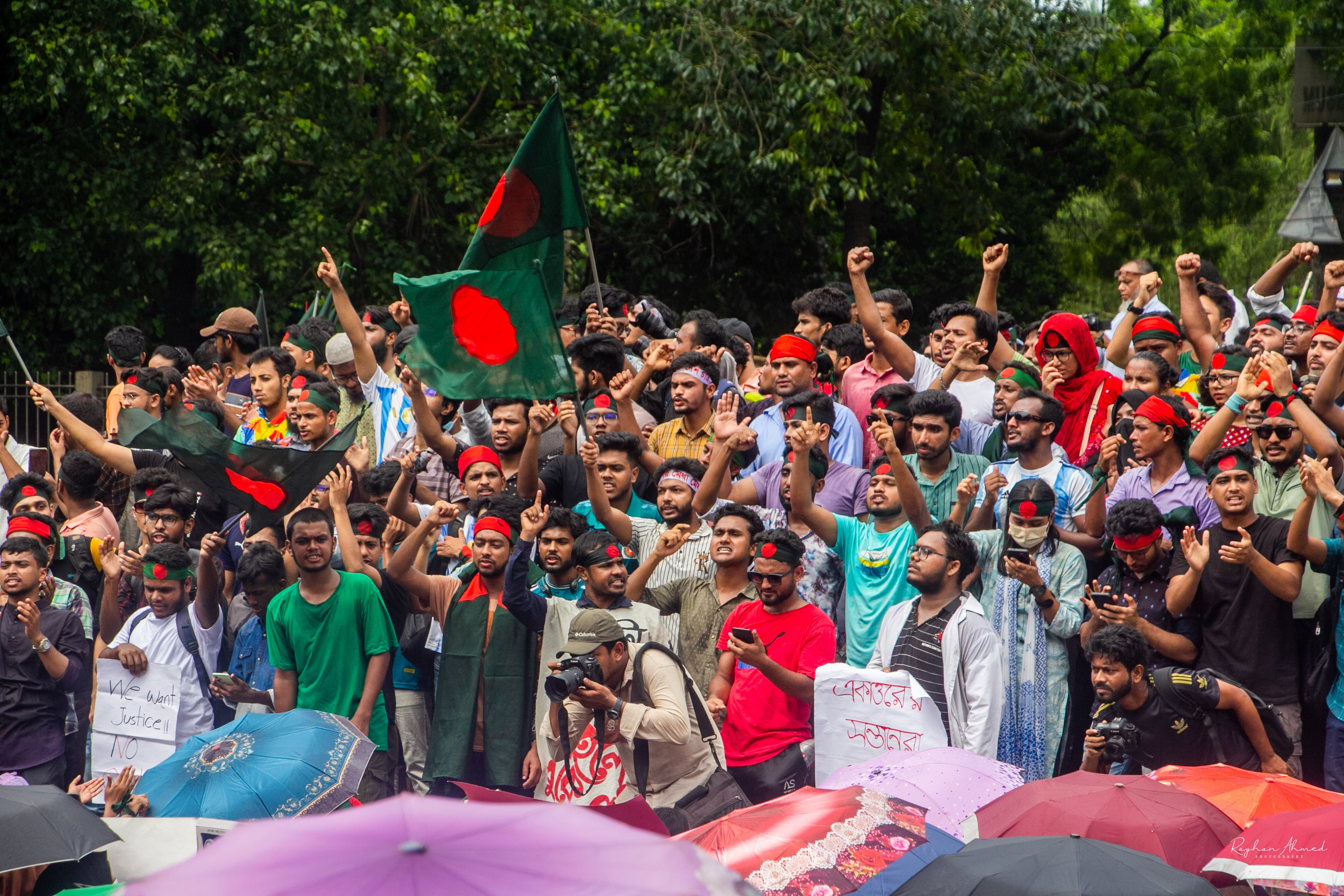
Bangladesh's Student–People's uprising of 2024 has been dubbed the world's first successful Generation Z–led revolution, ending Sheikh Hasina's 15-year-long autocratic rule.

Generation Z is the demographic cohort succeeding Millennials and preceding Generation Alpha. Researchers and popular media use the mid-to-late 1990s as starting birth years and the early 2010s as ending birth years, with the generation generally being defined as people born from 1997 to 2012.

In the late 2010s, Generation Z was often portrayed as a progressive cohort, showing strong support for social issues, such as climate change mitigation and socialism. This perception has been challenged in Europe and the United States where Gen Z voters have supported right-wing populist parties as well as left-wing populist parties.

The political divide within Gen Z has become increasingly pronounced along gender lines. Gen Z women tend to support progressive social movements more than their male peers. According to Politico, age may play a large role in political ideology of Gen Z depending on how young they were during world events such as the COVID-19 pandemic. Older members of Gen Z leaned progressive while younger members were more conservative, particularly in the United States.

Movements associated with Gen Z so far include fourth-wave feminism, School Strike for Climate, March for Our Lives, Students Against Discrimination and the Pro-Palestine movement. Gen Z protests have toppled governments in Asia and Africa, and are associated with internet activism.

Contrary to older generations, who mainly receive news from television news, Generation Z receives their information predominantly from social media.

== Voting patterns ==
According to Sean Simpsons of Ipsos, people are more likely to vote when they have more at stake, such as children to raise, homes to maintain, and income taxes to pay. The generational gap of political positions could be due to the fact that today's youths grew up in different sociopolitical environments to their parents and grandparents - environments which make them more likely to go to university, correlating with socially liberal views on certain issues. Since Gen Z are the second generation to own less than their predecessors at the same age, after Millennials, economically redistributive policies tend to be popular with the generation.

In recent years, a political gender gap between Gen Z men and women emerged, with Gen Z men leaning towards conservatism and right-wing populism, and women leaning towards support for liberal policies and left-wing populism, a gap that has been detected by various research and numerous countries, but more predominantly in Argentina, Brazil, the United States and South Korea.

=== Europe ===
In the 2019 European Parliament election in France, the support of the far-right National Rally (formerly the National Front) among those 35 and under nearly halved as compared to the 2014 election, where the Front won the plurality of votes in that age group. Depending on how the generation is defined, the 2014 election either had one year or no years of Generation Z voters, while the 2019 election had four to six years. In the first round of the 2017 presidential election, National Front candidate Marine Le Pen won more votes from people between the ages of 18 and 35 than any other candidate. Moreover, the share of women aged 18 to 26 who backed the Le Pen political family rose from 9% in 1988 to 32% in 2017, closing the gender gap in the process.

In Austria, more than one in two men between the ages of 18 and 29 voted for the nationalist Freedom Party in the 2016 presidential election, and 30% of those ages 18 to 29 voted for the Freedom Party in the 2017 parliamentary elections. However, in the 2019 European Parliament election, the Freedom Party came in third with the same age group (17%), behind both the Greens (28%) and the Social Democratic Party (22%).

In the 2019 European Parliament election in Germany, 30% of voters aged 18 to 30 voted for the Green Party, beating every other political party by wide margins in that particular age group.

In Italy, the populist party Five Star Movement won the youth vote overwhelmingly in the 2018 national election. But in the 2019 European Parliament election, the right-wing party Lega Nord won the largest vote-share among both millennials and Gen Z.

In the 2019 European Parliament election in Poland, the national-conservative Law and Justice party came first among those aged 18 to 29.

In the 2022 school elections in Sweden, in which 80% percent of all Swedish teenagers participated, 9% voted for left-wing parties, 21% voted for centre-left parties, 8% voted for a centrist party, 41% voted for centre-right parties, and 21% voted for a right-wing party.

Political scientist George Tilley notes that, in the United Kingdom, while older people tend to vote for the Conservative Party, young people tend to choose the Labour Party, the Liberal Democrats, or the Green Party. In the 2019 UK general election, the Labour Party had a 43-point lead over the Conservative Party among voters aged 18 to 24. Winning the support of young people does not necessarily translate to increasing young voters' turnouts in the UK, and positive reactions on social media may not lead to success at the ballot box. Despite reports of a surge in turnouts among young voters in the 2015 and 2017 United Kingdom general elections, statistical scrutiny by the British Elections Study revealed that the margin of error was too large to determine whether or not there was a significant increase or decrease in the number of young participants. In both cases, turnouts among those aged 18 to 24 was between 40% and 50%.

Ahead of the 2025 German federal election, the left-wing party Die Linke saw a surge amongst younger voters in the last days before the election, and eventually, came first amongst 18–24-year-old voters with 25% of the vote. The right-wing populist Alternative for Germany came second amongst the age group with 21% of the vote, stronger than with over 60-year-olds. Amongst the 18–24-year-olds, also a gender gap was visible, with 35% of women aged 18 to 24 voting for Die Linke and overall 60% of young women voting for left-wing parties (Die Linke, Social Democratic Party, The Greens), whilst amongst 18–24-year-old men, Alternative for Germany came first with 27% of the vote and about 50% of men voting for right-wing parties (also including Christian Democratic Union and classical liberal Free Democratic Party).

=== Americas ===
==== United States ====
In a 2016 mock election of upper elementary, middle, and high school students conducted by Houghton Mifflin Harcourt, Hillary Clinton beat Donald Trump among the students, with Clinton receiving 46% of the vote, Donald Trump receiving 41%, and other candidates receiving 12%. A 2017 survey produced by MTV and the Public Religion Research Institute found that 72% of Americans aged 15 to 24 held unfavorable views of President Donald Trump. A 2018 Pew Research Center poll found that among those aged 13 to 21, only 30% approved of Trump's job performance, and in a 2020 Politico poll, only about 28% of those aged 18 to 23 approved of Donald Trump's job performance.

In the 2018 midterm elections, voter turnout among 18 to 29-year-olds went up to 36% from 20% in 2014, the largest percentage point increase for any age group. This increase in youth turnout has been attributed to a rebuttal of Trump among young millennials and older members of Generation Z, as well as to the get out the vote initiatives that were part of the student-led gun violence protest March for Our Lives, which was described as "Generation Z's first social movement". However, according to a field survey by The Washington Post interviewing every fifth person at the protest, only ten percent of the participants were 18 years of age or younger. Meanwhile, the adult participants of the protest had an average age of just under 49.

According to a Politico survey, a 2020 presidential election with only Generation Z voters would see Joe Biden win 51% of the popular vote, compared to Donald Trump's 25%. However, almost half of Biden voters said they were voting against Trump rather than for Biden, reflected in lower approval ratings for both Joe Biden and congressional Democrats than the general public. In the 2020 presidential election, 50% of those aged 18 to 29 voted, compared to 39% in the 2016 election. In addition, voter turnout among newly eligible voters (ages 18 and 19) was 46%, stronger than previous years. The increase has also been attributed to the expansion of postal voting due to the COVID-19 pandemic.

Representative Madison Cawthorn (born in 1995) was the first member of Generation Z so far to be elected into the United States Congress.

In the 2024 U.S. election, Gen Z voters displayed notable gender-based differences in their voting patterns. Gen Z women tended to support progressive candidates, influenced by concerns about issues like reproductive rights, LGBTQ+ rights, and Fourth-wave feminism. Meanwhile, Gen Z men shifted further to Republican candidates like Donald Trump. Explanations for Trump's gains with young men include the economy, appealing to them through podcasters like Joe Rogan, "speaking to" their mental health struggles, less outreach from liberals, and men feeling "left behind" amid progress for women. Some post-election surveys of Gen Z voters have found their rightward shift in the 2024 election may have been temporary.

==== South America ====
In 2022, exit polls revealed that voters aged 18 to 24 intended to vote overwhelmingly (by a margin of over 35%) for Gustavo Petro in the runoff for the Colombian presidential election. Petro's victory marked the first time that a leftist politician was elected to the office.

The same phenomenon was seen in the 2022 presidential election in Brazil, where polls estimate that 51% of young voters between 16 and 24 years voted for the Workers' Party candidate, Luiz Inácio Lula da Silva, elected with 50.9% of the votes. The Socialism and Freedom Party (PSOL), that targets young voters from the middle class, was the fastest growing party in Brazil since 2017.

Argentina, on the other hand, has seen an uprising of right-wing and pro-market movements in younger generations, as polls estimate that the majority of young voters between 16 and 24 years voted Javier Milei for president in the 2023 Argentine general election.

== Social values ==
=== Family values and abortion ===
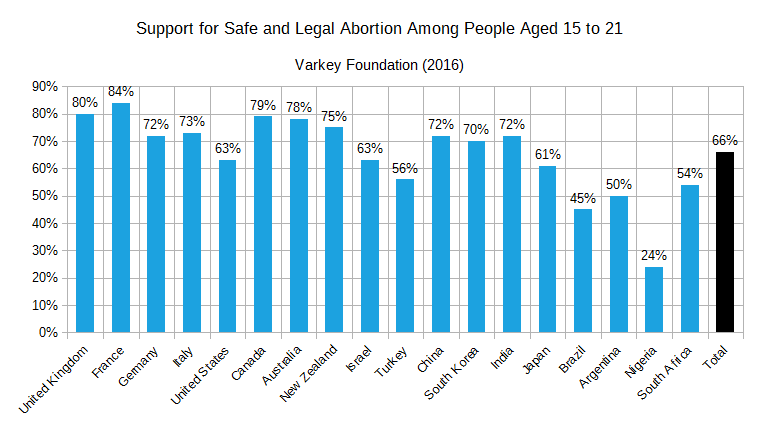

A 2018 Pew Research Center survey studied various family values among generations. Among Generation Z, 67% were indifferent towards premarital cohabitation. 49% considered single motherhood to be neither a positive or a negative for society. 62% saw increased ethnic or racial diversity as good for society and 53% for interracial marriage. In the case of financial responsibility in a two-parent household, majorities from across the generations (79% of Generation Z) answered that it should be shared by both parents. Across all the generations surveyed, at least 84% thought that both parents ought to be responsible for rearing children. About 13% of Generation Z thought that mothers should be the primary caretaker of children, while very few thought that fathers should be the ones mainly responsible.

In 2016, the Varkey Foundation and Populus conducted an international study examining the attitudes of 20,000 people aged 15 to 21 in twenty countries. (Note: Survey included people born between 1995 and 2001, which includes two years of Millennials.) (Note: Countries studied in 2016 Varkey Foundation-Populus international study: Argentina, Australia, Brazil, Canada, China, France, Germany, India, Indonesia, Israel, Italy, Japan, New Zealand, Nigeria, Russia, South Africa, South Korea, Turkey, the U.K., and the U.S.) The survey showed that 66% of people aged 15 to 21 favored legal abortion, but there was significant variation among the countries surveyed: support for this procedure was strongest in France, the United Kingdom, and Canada, but lowest in Argentina, Brazil, and Nigeria. Gallup polls conducted in 2020 in the U.S. revealed that 61% of people aged 18 to 29—older members of Generation Z and younger Millennials—considered themselves pro-choice, while only 34% identified as pro-life. In general, the older someone was, the less likely that they supported access to abortion. Nevertheless, anti-abortion sentiments among American youths in the early 2020s were sufficiently strong to motivate them to participate in the annual March for Life in Washington D.C.

Following the overturning of Roe v. Wade in 2022, 65% of men and 71% of women aged 18 to 29 in America supported legal abortion in "most or all cases". However, in the 2024 presidential election, only 43% of Gen Z men said that abortion was a "critical issue".

=== Gender equality and LGBT rights ===

The 2016 Varkey Foundation and Populus survey also asked about people's viewpoints on moral questions regarding sex and gender. Overall, 89% supported equality between men and women, with support being the highest in Canada and China (both 94%), and the lowest in Japan (74%) and Nigeria (68%). 74% favored recognizing transgender rights, but with large national differences, from an overwhelming majority of 83% in Canada to a bare majority of 57% in Nigeria. 63% approved of same-sex marriage, but there were again huge variations among countries. 81% of young Germans and 80% of young Canadians agreed that same-sex couples should be allowed to marry, compared to only 33% of young Turks and 16% of young Nigerians who did. In a 2018 Pew Research Center survey, 48% of Generation Z participants said that same-sex marriage was good for society.

=== Civil liberties ===
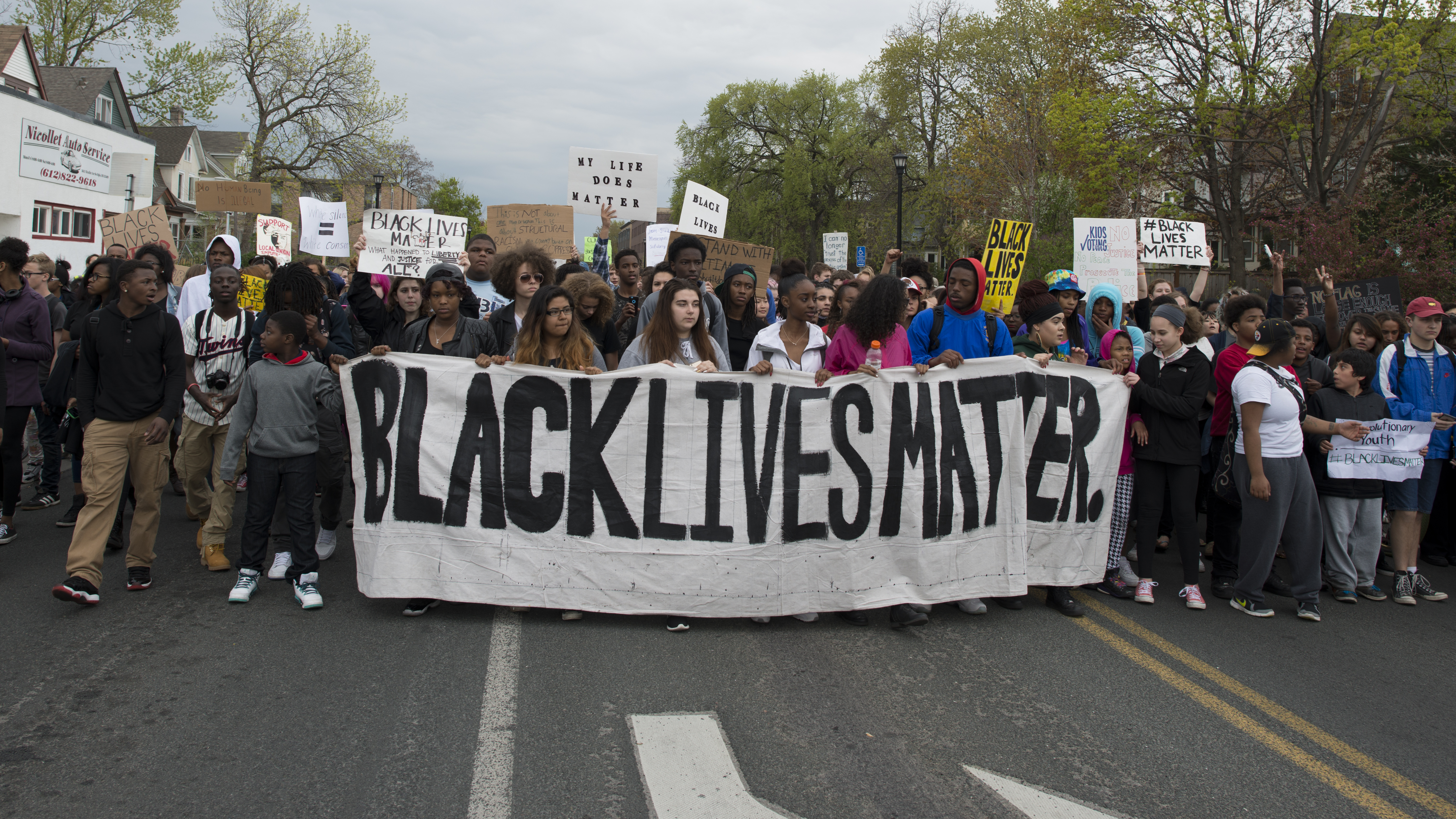
Minneapolis students participate in a school walkout to protest police brutality in the United States, 2015.

A 2020 Politico survey showed that American voters aged 18 to 23 support the Black Lives Matter movement to a greater extent (68%) than all registered voters (54%), and support police much less (39%) than all registered voters (66%). While Democrats of all ages generally agree that black people are treated unfairly in the United States at equal rates (roughly 80%), Gen Z Republicans agree at much greater rates (43%) than millennial Republicans (30%) or older generations (20-23%). Gen Z also supported protesters and protests more than registered voters by a 12% margin, and were more likely to view protesting as an effective way to make political change.

In a worldwide Deloitte survey, 60% of Generation Z say that systemic racism is widespread in society. Over two in ten also reported that they felt discriminated against "all the time", with this number rising to three in ten among sexual minorities, and four in ten among ethnic minorities.

A 2016 Varkey Foundation and Populus survey found that, worldwide, young people's support for free speech dwindled if it was deemed offensive to a religion (56% support) or a minority group (49%).

== Economic values ==
Generation Z is much more likely to turn to their parents for financial advice than Millennials. Unlike their predecessors, members of Generation Z are more cautious of developing financial debt and many are already saving for retirement. Their money-saving habits are reminiscent of those who came of age during the Great Depression. In the second quarter of 2019, the number of people from Generation Z carrying a credit card balance increased by 41% compared to that of 2018 (from 5,483,000 to 7,746,000), as the first wave of this demographic cohort became old enough to take out a mortgage, a loan, or to have credit-card debt, according to TransUnion. The financial industry expects continued growth in credit activity by Generation Z, whose rate of credit delinquency is comparable to those of the Millennials and Generation X. According to a 2019 report from the financial firm Northwestern Mutual, student loans were the top source of debt for Generation Z, at 25%. For comparison, mortgages were the top source of debt for the Baby Boomers (28%) and Generation X (30%); for the Millennials, it was credit card bills (25%).

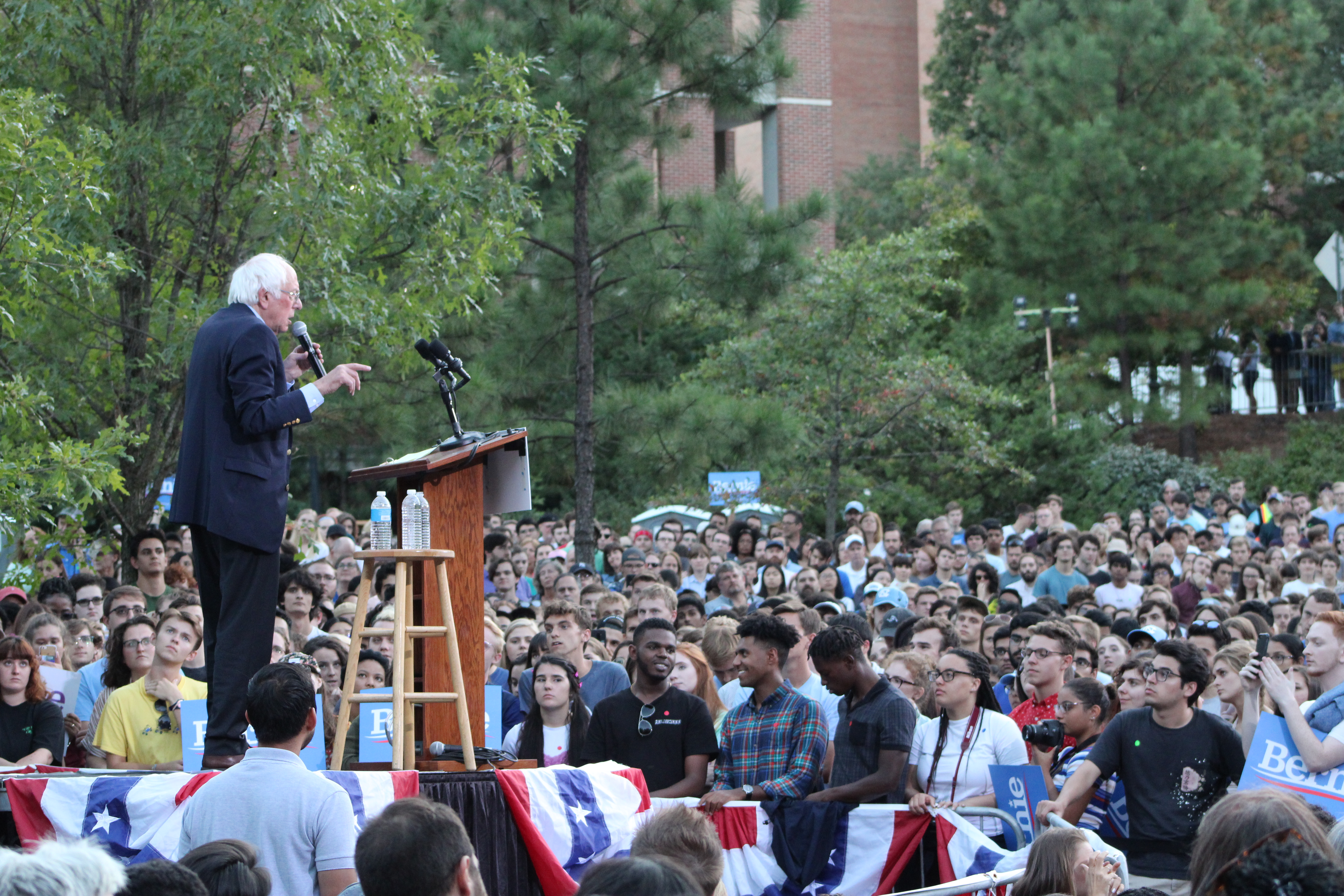
Bernie Sanders, a self-described democratic socialist, speaks at UNC-Chapel Hill for his 2020 presidential campaign, 2019.

Generation Z views socialism more positively than previous generations, especially in the United States. In a 2018 Gallup poll, 51% of Americans aged 18 to 29—young Millennials and older Gen Z—have a positive view of socialism, compared to 45% having a positive view of capitalism. In a 2019 poll by YouGov and Victims of Communism Memorial Foundation found that more than half of Gen Z Americans have an unfavorable view of capitalism, and almost two-thirds said they were likely to vote for a socialist candidate. Much of this shift has been attributed to Bernie Sanders's 2016 and 2020 presidential campaigns. Additionally, according to the 2020 Edelman Trust Barometer, 57% of those ages 18 to 34 worldwide say that modern-day capitalism "does more harm than good", though this figure roughly corresponds with all other age groups.

Though still generally popular among all age groups, Europeans ages 18 to 29 are less likely than older groups to support fiscal redistribution. This age group in the EU is also more likely to attribute poverty to “laziness or lack of willpower", though this sentiment is not the majority view of the cohort in most countries in Europe.

According to a 2021 Forefront Market Research poll commissioned by the Institute of Economic Affairs, a conservative think tank, 67% of young people in the UK (those aged 16 to 34) say they would like to live in a socialist economic system. The poll also found that overwhelming majorities of Gen Z Britons (aged 16 to 22) blame capitalism for the UK housing crisis to some extent, label climate change as a capitalist problem, and would like to nationalize utilities and railways.

According to a 2018 International Federation of Accountants survey of G20 countries, the top three public policy priorities for members of Generation Z are the stability of the national economy, the quality of education, and the availability of jobs. The bottom issues, on the other hand, were addressing income and wealth inequality, making regulations smarter and more effective, and improving the effectiveness of international taxation. Moreover, healthcare is a top priority for Generation Z in Canada, France, Germany, and the United States. Tackling wealth and income inequality is deemed of vital importance in Indonesia, Saudi Arabia, and Turkey.

== International affairs ==
Polling has shown that Generation Z is, on the whole, less nationalist than previous generations, a shift stemming in part from increased contact with other cultures.

In 2019, Harvard University's Institute of Politics Youth Poll asked voters aged 18 to 29 – younger Millennials and the first wave of Generation Z – what they would like to be priorities for US foreign policy. They found that the top issues for these voters were countering terrorism and protecting human rights (both 39%), and protecting the environment (34%). Preventing nuclear proliferation and defending U.S. allies were not as important to young American voters. According to the Eurobarometer in 2016 to 2018, over 60% of Europeans between 15 and 24 viewed globalization positively, in stark contrast with older cohorts.

A 2018 YouGov poll asked British voters whether leaving the European Union was a good idea in hindsight. They found that 42% said yes while 45% said no. Among them, 19% of those between the ages of 18 and 24 said yes, as did 61% of pensioners. Overall the British public has not changed their minds on the issue as this aligned with the results of the 2016 Brexit referendum when younger voters were more likely to vote to stay in the European Union.

=== Immigration ===

In a 2016 Varkey Foundation and Populus international survey, the question of whether or not those 15 to 21 favored legal migration received mixed responses. Overall, 31% believed their governments should make it easier for immigrants to work and live legally in their countries while 23% said it should be more difficult, a margin of 8%. While 72% of Brazilian youths thought their government was doing too little to address the international refugee crisis, only 16% of young Turks did; in the U.K. that number was 48%.

A YouGov poll conducted in the spring of 2018 revealed that 41% of Britons between the ages of 18 and 24 thought that immigration to their country was "too high", compared to 58% of those 25 to 49.

=== Gaza war ===
Members of Generation Z are more likely to support Palestine and oppose Israel than any other generation. According to an October 2023 NPR/PBS NewsHour/Marist National poll which surveyed 1,313 U.S. adults, 48% of Millennials and Generation Z said that the U.S. government should publicly voice support for Israel, compared to 63% of Generation X, 83% of the baby boomers, and 86% from the Silent and Greatest Generation. In December 2023, More in Common conducted a survey among British citizens from various age groups. Generation Z respondents were the most likely to consider Hamas to be freedom fighters and the least likely to consider Hamas a terrorist organisation.

== Environmentalism ==
Global warming—the progression from cooler historical temperatures (blue) to recent warmer temperatures (red)—is being experienced disproportionately by younger generations. With continued fossil fuel emissions, that trend that will continue.

Generation Z is more likely than other generations to believe that climate change is real and to support climate change mitigation. Polling from 2018 of Americans over the age of 13 by Pew suggested that 54% of Generation Z believed that climate change is real (making them the second-most likely cohort to do so) and is due to human activities, while only 10% reject the scientific consensus on climate change.

A worldwide Deloitte survey saw that climate change and protecting the environment top Generation Z's primary concerns, with curbing unemployment and expanding health care access not far behind.

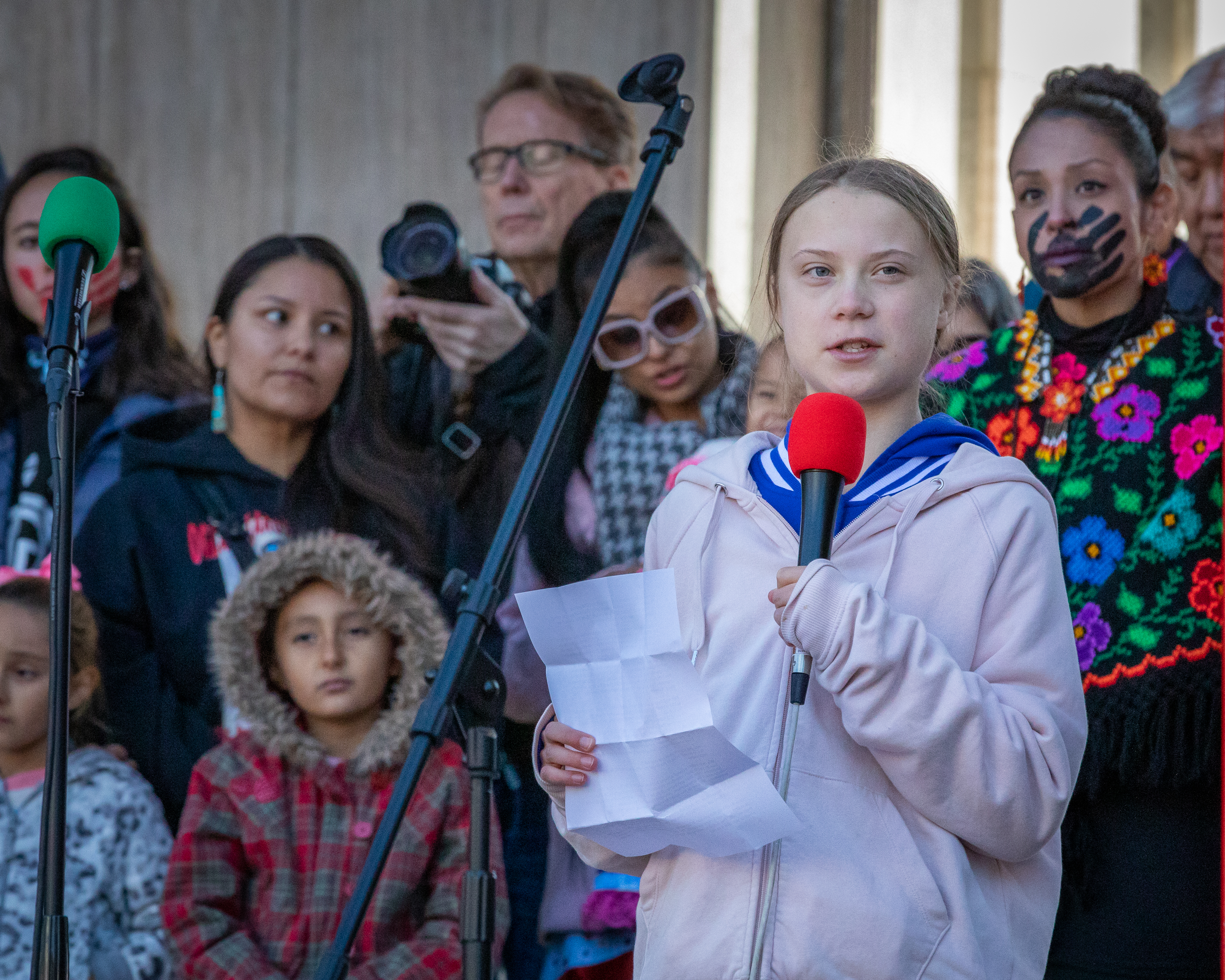
In 2018, Greta Thunberg began to inspire worldwide protests for greater action against climate change.

A 2019 poll of over 10,000 internet users aged 18 to 25 years old in 22 countries around the world found that 41% of responders believed that climate change was one of the most important issues facing the world, the most popular response. The second-most common problem cited was environment-related pollution at 36%. Top priorities on a national level differed but environmental concerns also polled relatively strongly in this category. A 2020 survey conducted for Newsround of Britons aged 8 to 16 suggested that 80% of young Generation Z viewed climate change as a problem, with more than a third thinking it was "very important". 58% of respondents worried about the impact that climate change would have on their future. 19% said they faced nightmares about the topic whilst 17% said it had affected their eating and sleeping habits. 41% of respondents did not trust adults to properly address the crisis. Addressing climate change is very important for Generation Z in India and South Korea. In contrast, less than 20% of Europeans aged 15 to 24 viewed climate change as a top 2 challenge facing the EU according to the Eurobarometer.

One of the earliest political movements primarily driven by Generation Z was School Strike for Climate in the late 2010s. The movement saw millions of young people around the world, inspired by the activities of Swedish teenage activist Greta Thunberg, protest for greater action on climate change.

== Other views ==
=== Trust in institutions ===
In 2019, the Pew Research Center interviewed over 2,000 Americans aged 18 and over on their views of various components of the federal government. They found that 54% of the people between the ages of 18 and 29 wanted larger government compared to 43% who preferred smaller government and fewer services. Older people were more likely to pick the second option.

According to a 2018 survey by Pew Research Center, 70% of Generation Z want the government to play a more active role in solving their problems.

However Gen Z's trust in institutions may have seen a large decrease: In the Fall 2024 Harvard Youth Poll, only 11% of those ages 18–29 felt that the United States is “generally headed in the right direction,” and a 2023 poll by the American Public Media Research Lab found that only 27% of Americans ages 18–25 “agree strongly” that democracy is the best system of government, compared with 48% for all ages.

=== Gun ownership ===
"The people in the government who are voted into power are lying to us ... And us kids seem to be the only ones who notice and are prepared to call B.S."

— X González, February 18, 2018, in Fort Lauderdale

The March for Our Lives, a protest taking place in the aftermath of the Stoneman Douglas High School shooting in 2018 was described by various media outlets as being led by students and young people. Some even describe it as the political "awakening" of Generation Z or that these protesters were "the voice of a generation on gun control".

In a 2019 Rasmussen poll, US Gen Z and Millennial respondents supported stricter gun laws at the highest rates—68%. Majorities of older generations also agreed. In a 2017 poll, Pew found that among the age group 18 to 29, 27% personally owned a gun and 16% lived with a gun owner, for a total of 43% living in a household with at least one gun. Nationwide, a similar percentage of American adults lived in a household with a gun.

=== COVID-19 pandemic ===
According to a worldwide Deloitte survey, 69% of those in Gen Z reported that they took their government's public health guidelines seriously during 2020. Members of Generation Z surveyed also feel that they are doing more than others in their countries to limit the spread of COVID-19.

== See also ==
- Alt-right (-pipeline)
  - /pol/
    - He Will Not Divide Us
    - It's okay to be white
    - Super Straight (sexuality)
  - Alt-lite
    - r/The Donald
- Bull Moose Project
- Generation
- Social justice warrior
  - Political correctness
    - Cancel culture
  - BreadTube
- Youth politics
  - Youth activism
    - Arab Spring
      - Arab Summer
    - Gen Z protests
      - Asian Spring
    - Gen-Z for Change
    - Occupy movement
      - Occupy Wall Street
    - Voters of Tomorrow
- Millennial politics
  - Millennial socialism
