= Youth politics =

Issues which distinctly involve, affect or impact youth

Youth politics is a category of issues that distinctly involve, affect or otherwise impact youth. It encompasses youth policy that specifically has an impact on young people (for example, education, housing, employment, leisure) and how young people engage in politics including in institutional politics (elections, membership of a political party), youth organisations and lifestyle.

== History ==
=== United States ===
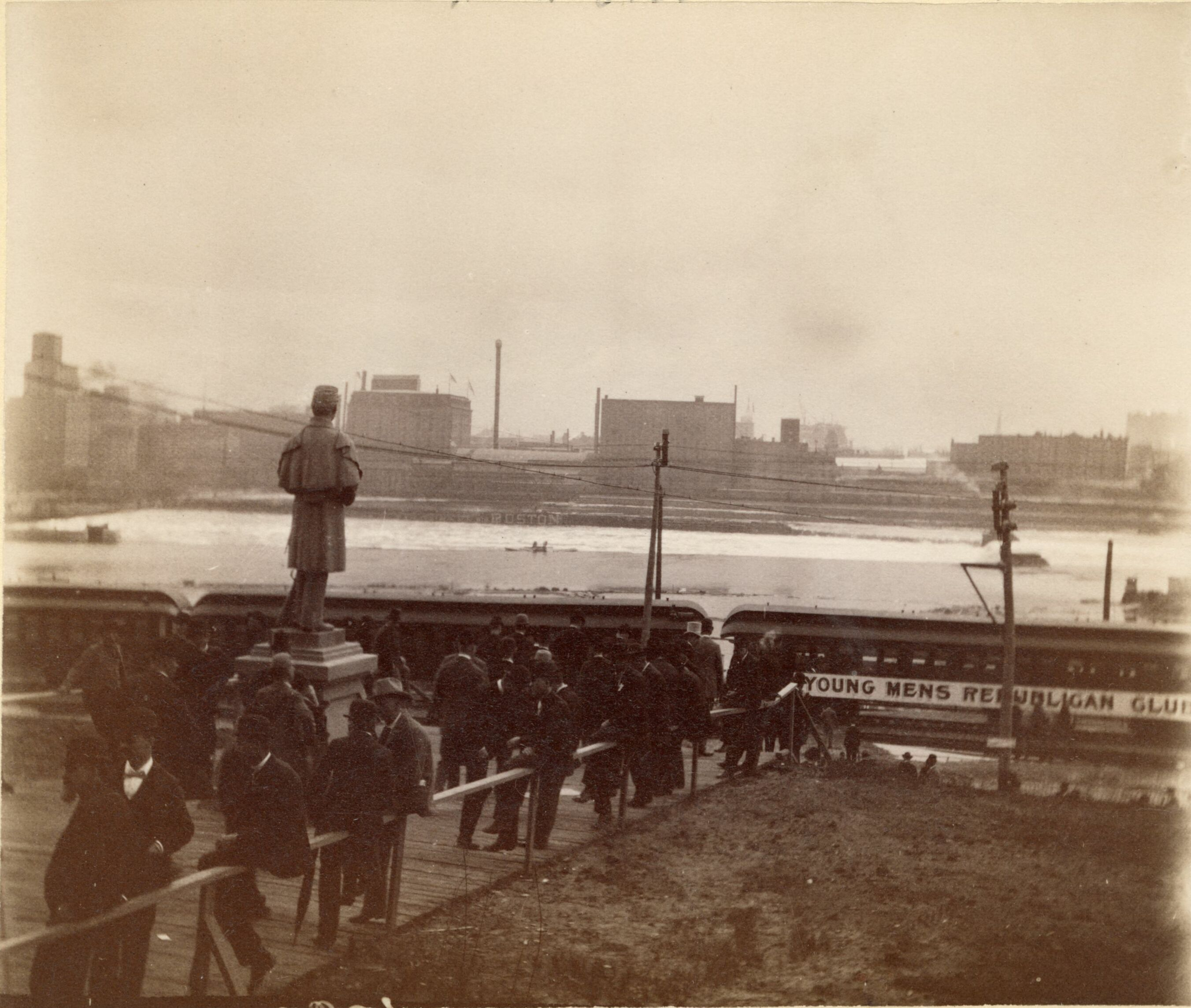
Train car marked "Young Men's Republican Club" Minneapolis, at the Republican National Convention June 7, 1892

With roots in the early youth activism of the newsboys and Mother Jones' child labor protests at the turn of the 20th century, youth politics were first identified in American politics with the formation of the American Youth Congress in the 1930s. In the 1950s and 1960s organizations such as the Student Nonviolent Coordinating Committee and Students for a Democratic Society were closely associated with youth politics, despite the broad social statements of documents including the liberal Port Huron Statement and the conservative Sharon Statement and leaders such as Martin Luther King Jr.

Our answer is the world's hope; it is to rely on youth. The cruelties and obstacles of this swiftly changing planet will not yield to obsolete dogmas and outworn slogans. It cannot be moved by those who cling to a present which is already dying, who prefer the illusion of security to the excitement of danger. It demands the qualities of youth: not a time of life but a state of mind, a temper of the will, a quality of the imagination, a predominance of courage over timidity, of the appetite for adventure over the love of ease. - Robert F. Kennedy, South Africa, 6-6-1966

=== Europe ===
Youth politics have an extensive history in Europe, as well. Free German Youth was founded in 1946 in the Soviet occupation zone of Germany, and served as the official youth organization of East Germany.

In the UK there is a strong youth politics movement, consisting primarily of the British Youth Council, the UK Youth Parliament and the Scottish Youth Parliament. Although they have no direct power, the young people in these organisations have a close working relationship with Members of Parliament and are fairly influential, albeit ineffectual at bringing about direct change or tangible objectives. Many organisations that strive for youth movement are on the rise. A notable organisation is YouthDebates, an online organisation aiming to engage young people in the world of politics.

Research from the Czech Republic suggests that young MPs are more productive than their middle-aged and senior colleagues in their legislative duties and are also more likely to challenge party discipline at roll call.

=== Globally ===
Other continents have experienced a variety of youth politics and political movements.

In the recent Mexico’s presidential election another manifestation of how the youth take the politics in the actual world were see, the students movement called “Yo soy 132” made a very notable change in how the elections developed, showing proofs of the electoral fraud they thought will happen, they changed the percentage of acceptation of the PRI candidate, Enrique Peña Nieto and they achieved to decrease it around 12 percentage points between the highest poll results for the candidate and the final results of the elections. In India youth politicians play an important role. Rishabh Mukati is the youngest politician and leader of India. He has organised sports events and various programs to help youth realize their dreams and awaken the Youth Power of India. Increasingly, young people are involved in global youth-led protest movements, for example, about social and environmental justice. This activism is in part because young people have been particularly affected by various crises (political, social, economic, environmental) notably austerity. Moreover, young people tend to have more post-materialist values (see work by Ronald Inglehart).

== Present ==
Between the influence of mainstream media and politicians, youth politics in the United States has been delegitimized and deprioritized. Organizations such as National Youth Rights Association and The Freechild Project continue to advocate and educate for issues that affect young people specifically, while other organizations, including Youth Service America and Advocates for Youth work for issues that affect youth directly. Even with the efforts of these organizations, many college students do not see politics as an important part of their lives. Only 33% of college freshmen think being knowledgeable about politics is important. Data collected in by the National Center for Education Statistics found that overall young Americans care more about entertainment and sports than political and foreign news. Despite these statistics there is a positive outlook on youth involvement in the future because of the 2008 election when President Barack Obama ran.

=== List of current youth politics issues ===
There are several issues which are deemed "youth politics" by politicians, mainstream media and other sources.

- Age of candidacy
- Age of majority
- Child labor laws/right-to-work laws
- Climate change
- Conscription or the draft
- Corporal punishment
- Drinking age
- Driving age
- Education policy/reform
- Emancipation of minors
- Environmental issues
- Global warming
- Healthcare
- Immigration
- Minors and abortion
- National service
- School reform
- Student rights
- Voting age
- Youth participation
- Youth service
- Youth vote

=== List of current youth politics organizations ===
There are thousands of youth political organizations and programs around the world.

- Akhil Bharatiya Vidyarthi Parishad
- All India Socialist Youth Council
- All-Polish Youth
- Bibeksheel Nepali
- British Youth Council
- Bus Project
- Christian Democratic Youth
- College Democrats of America
- College Republican National Committee
- Communist Youth of Côte d'Ivoire
- Communist Youth of Greece
- Communist Youth Movement
- Democratic Youth Movement
- Egypt Youth Party
- European Free Alliance Youth
- European Liberal Youth
- Green Youth, Germany
- Green Youth, Sweden
- High School Democrats of America
- Indian Youth Congress
- International Federation of Liberal Youth
- JONG
- Jugendverband REBELL
- Malaysian United Democratic Alliance
- National Youth Organisation (disambiguation)
- Northern Ireland Young Communist League
- Puerto Rico Statehood Students Association
- Sangguniang Kabataan
- Sveriges Socialdemokratiska Ungdomsförbund (Sweden)
- Scottish Socialist Youth
- Scottish Young Liberals
- Scottish Youth Parliament
- Traction
- Teenage Republicans
- Turkey Youth Union
- UK Youth Parliament
- UMNO Youth
- Young Democratic Socialists of America
- Young Democrats for Europe
- Young Democrats of America
- Young Independence
- Young Liberals of Canada
- Youth wings of political parties in Denmark
- Youth of the Danish People's Party
- Youth of the Progress Party
- Youth of the Popular Movement against EU
- Young Americans for Freedom
- Young Communist League of Germany
- Young Ecologists
- Young Republicans

== See also ==
- Youth voice
- Youth activism
- Youth empowerment
- Youth rights
- Youth organizations
- List of youth councils
- Category:Youth model government
- Youth exclusion
- Youth in Hong Kong
- Millennial socialism
