= Millennial politics =

Political views of people born 1981–1996

Millennials, also known as Generation Y, are the demographic cohort following Generation X and preceding Generation Z. The generation is typically defined as people born from 1981 to 1996. Millennials are reshaping political discourse, showing evolving attitudes towards governance, social issues, and economic policies. Their increasing political participation and distinct generational identity signify a transformative phase in contemporary politics, with potential long-term implications for national and global political trends.

American millennials exhibit a complex spectrum of political views, paralleling broader generational shifts in attitudes towards social, economic, and political issues. Surveys indicate a significant portion of millennials' political views align with their parents, though a notable fraction express more liberal tendencies. Key issues for US millennials include support for same-sex marriage, varying attitudes towards the LGBT community, and a more moderate stance on political ideologies compared to older generations. Millennials in the United States demonstrate increasing skepticism towards capitalism, with a preference for socialism seen in younger segments of the demographic. Canadian millennials played a crucial role in the election of Justin Trudeau, driven by social and economic liberal values. Despite historically low political participation, the 2015 federal election saw a surge in youth voter turnout, influenced by Trudeau's progressive campaign promises.

British millennials, characterized by a relative political disengagement in their early years, have shown liberal tendencies on social and economic matters, favoring individual liberty and limited government intervention. Significant political moments like the Brexit referendum mobilized young voters, displaying a strong preference for remaining in the European Union, highlighting generational divides in political priorities and attitudes.

Across Europe, millennials are part of a larger shift towards post-materialist values, emphasizing environmentalism, social liberalism, and global citizenship. This generational shift is contributing to changing political landscapes, challenging traditional party alignments and contributing to the rise of new political movements. French millennials, while exempt from mandatory military service, still engage in a Defense and Citizenship Day, reflecting continued engagement with national civic duties. A significant majority support the reintroduction of some form of national service, reflecting broader desires for national cohesion and integration.

== American millennials ==
=== Views ===
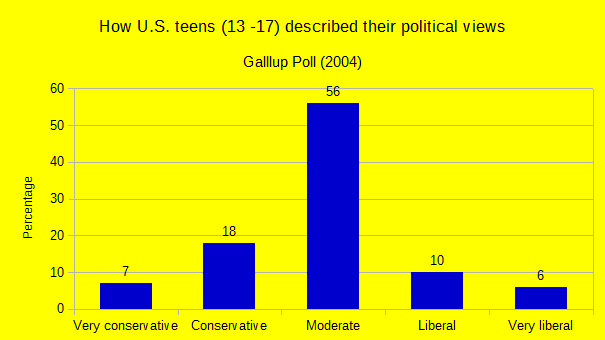
How Americans aged 13 to 17 described their political views in 2004 according to a Gallup poll

A 2004 Gallup poll of Americans aged 13 to 17 found that 71% said their social and political views were more or less the same as those of their parents. 21% thought they were more liberal and 7% more conservative. According to demographer and public policy analyst Philip Longman, "even among baby boomers, those who wound up having children have turned out to be remarkably similar to their parents in their attitudes about "family" values." In the postwar era, most returning servicemen looked forward to "making a home and raising a family" with their wives and lovers, and for many men, family life was a source of fulfillment and a refuge from the stress of their careers. Life in the late 1940s and 1950s was centered about the family and the family was centered around children. Researchers found that while only 9% of teenagers who identified with the Republican Party considered themselves more conservative than their parents, compared to 77% who shared their parents' views, 25% of adolescents who identified with the Democratic Party and 28% of politically independent teens said they were more liberal than their parents. Another 2004 Gallup poll of the same age group found that a clear majority of teenagers considered themselves to be politically moderate, 56%. Only 7% and 18% deemed themselves very conservative or conservative, respectively, and 10% and 6% believed they were liberal or very liberal, respectively. (The bar plot roughly resembles a Gaussian distribution or an isosceles triangle centered around moderates. See right.) By comparing with a 2004 poll of Americans aged 18 and over, Gallup discovered that teens were substantially more moderate than adults (56% to 38%), less conservative (25% to 40%), and just about as liberal (16% to 19%). However, political scientist Elias Dinas discovered, by studying the results from the Political Socialisation Panel Study and further data from the United Kingdom and the United States, that while children born to politically engaged parents tended to be politically engaged themselves, those who absorbed their parents' views the earliest were also the most likely to abandon them later in life.

The Economist observed in 2013 that, like their British counterparts, millennials in the United States held more positive attitudes towards recognizing same-sex marriage than older demographic cohorts. However, a 2018 poll conducted by Harris on behalf of the LGBT advocacy group GLAAD found that despite being frequently described as the most tolerant segment of society, people aged 18 to 34—most millennials and the oldest members of Generation Z—have become less accepting of LGBT individuals compared to previous years. In 2016, 63% of Americans in that age group said they felt comfortable interacting with members of the LGBT community; that number dropped to 53% in 2017 and then to 45% in 2018. On top of that, more people reported discomfort learning that a family member was LGBT (from 29% in 2017 to 36% in 2018), having a child learning LGBT history (30% to 39%), or having an LGBT doctor (27% to 34%). Harris found that young women were driving this development; their overall comfort levels dived from 64% in 2017 to 52% in 2018. In general, the fall of comfort levels was the steepest among people aged 18 to 34 between 2016 and 2018. (Seniors aged 72 or above became more tolerant of LGBT doctors or having their (grand) children taking LGBT history lessons during the same period, albeit with a bump in discomfort levels in 2017.) Results from this Harris poll were released on the 50th anniversary of the riots that broke out in Stonewall Inn, New York City, in June 1969, thought to be the start of the LGBT rights movement. At that time, homosexuality was considered a mental illness or a crime in many U.S. states.

In 2018, Gallup conducted a survey of almost 14,000 Americans from all 50 states and the District of Columbia aged 18 and over on their political sympathies. They found that overall, younger adults tended to lean liberal while older adults tilted conservative. More specifically, groups with strong conservative leanings included the elderly, residents of the Midwest and the South, and people with some or no college education. Groups with strong liberal leanings were adults with advanced degrees, whereas those with moderate liberal leanings included younger adults (18 to 29 and 30 to 49), women, and residents of the East. Gallup found little variations by income groups compared to the national average. Among adults between the ages of 18 and 29—older Generation Z and younger millennials—Gallup found that 30% identified as liberals, 40% as moderates, and 26% as conservatives. Among adults aged 30 to 49—older millennials and younger Generation X—they found that 30% considered themselves liberals, 37% moderates, and 29% conservatives.(See above.) Between 1992 and 2018, the number of people identifying as liberals steadily increased, 17% to 26%, mainly at the expense of the group identifying as moderates. Meanwhile, the proportion of conservatives remained largely unchanged, albeit with fluctuations. Between 1994 and 2018, the number of members of the Democratic Party identifying as liberal rose from 25% to 51%, as the number of both moderates and conservatives gradually fell. Liberals became a majority in this political party for the first time in 2018. During the same period, in the Republican Party, the proportion of people calling themselves conservatives climbed from 58% to 73% while the numbers of moderates and liberals both dropped. In other words, this political party saw its conservative majority expanding. Meanwhile, among political independents, the percentage of moderates, the dominant group, remained largely unchanged.

2018 surveys of American teenagers 13 to 17 and adults aged 18 or over conducted by the Pew Research Center found that millennials and Generation Z held similar views on various political and social issues. More specifically, 56% of millennials believed that climate change is real and is due to human activities while only 8% reject the scientific consensus on climate change. 64% wanted the government to play a more active role in solving their problems. 65% were indifferent towards pre-nuptial cohabitation. 48% considered single motherhood to be neither a positive or a negative for society. 61% saw increased ethnic or racial diversity as good for society. 47% did the same for same-sex marriage, and 53% interracial marriage. (See chart.) In most cases, millennials tended hold quite different views from the Silent Generation, with the Baby Boomers and Generation X in between. In the case of financial responsibility in a two-parent household, though, majorities from across the generations answered that it should be shared, with 58% for the Silent Generation, 73% for the Baby Boomers, 78% for Generation X, and 79% for both the millennials and Generation Z. Across all the generations surveyed, at least 84% thought that both parents ought to be responsible for rearing children. Very few thought that fathers should be the ones mainly responsible for taking care of children.

In 2015, a Pew Research study found 40% of millennials in the United States supported government restriction of public speech offensive to minority groups. Support for restricting offensive speech was lower among older generations, with 27% of Gen Xers, 24% of Baby Boomers, and only 12% of the Silent Generation supporting such restrictions. Pew Research noted similar age related trends in the United Kingdom, but not in Germany and Spain, where millennials were less supportive of restricting offensive speech than older generations. In France, Italy, and Poland no significant age differences were observed. In the U.S. and UK during the mid-2010s, younger millennials brought changes to higher education via drawing attention to microaggressions and advocating for implementation of safe spaces and trigger warnings in the university setting. Critics of such changes have raised concerns regarding their impact on free speech, asserting these changes can promote censorship, while proponents have described these changes as promoting inclusiveness.

A 2018 Gallup poll found that people aged 18 to 29 have a more favorable view of socialism than capitalism, 51% to 45%. Nationally, 56% of Americans prefer capitalism compared to 37% who favor socialism. Older Americans consistently prefer capitalism to socialism. Whether the current attitudes of millennials and Generation Z on capitalism and socialism will persist or dissipate as they grow older remains to be seen.

Gallup polls conducted in 2019 revealed that 62% of people aged 18 to 29—older members of Generation Z and younger millennials—support giving women access to abortion while 33% opposed. In general, the older someone was, the less likely that they supported abortion. 56% of people aged 65 or over did not approve of abortion compared to 37% who did. (See chart to the right.) Gallup found in 2018 that nationwide, Americans are split on the issue of abortion, with equal numbers of people considering themselves "pro-life" or "pro-choice", 48%.

In his doctoral dissertation submitted in 2003, social psychologist Jason Weeden conducted statistical analyses on general-public and undergraduate datasets and reached conclusions supporting the hypothesis that attitudes towards abortion are more strongly predicted by mating-relevant variables than by variables related to views on the sanctity of life. Some evolutionary psychologists and sociologists believe that the various mating strategies are in direct strategic conflict—a zero-sum game—and as such can influence political persuasion. For instance, the stability of long-term partnerships may be threatened by the availability of short-term sexual opportunities. Therefore, public policy measures that impose costs on casual sexual intercourse may benefit people pursuing long-term mating strategies by reducing the availability of short-term mating opportunities outside of committed relationships. Such policies include the prohibition of abortion and of recreational drug use. This relationship remained strong even when controlling for personality traits, political orientation, and moral values. By contrast, nonsexual variables typically associated with attitudes towards drug legalization were strongly attenuated or eliminated when controlling for sexuality-related measures. These findings were replicated in Belgium, Japan, and the Netherlands.

Polls conducted by Gallup and the Pew Research Center found that support for stricter gun laws among people aged 18 to 29 and 18 to 36, respectively, is statistically no different from that of the general population. According to Gallup, 57% of Americans are in favor of stronger gun control legislation. In a 2017 poll, Pew found that among the age group 18 to 29, 27% personally owned a gun and 16% lived with a gun owner, for a total of 43% living in a household with at least one gun. Nationwide, a similar percentage of American adults lived in a household with a gun (41%).

In 2019, the Pew Research Center interviewed over 2,000 Americans aged 18 and over on their views of various components of the federal government. They found that 54% of the people between the ages of 18 and 29 wanted larger government and larger compared to 43% who preferred smaller government and fewer services. Meanwhile, 46% of those between the ages of 30 and 49 favored larger government compared to 49% who picked the other option. Older people were more likely to dislike larger government. Overall, the American people remain divided over the size and scope of government, with 48% preferring smaller government with fewer services and 46% larger government and more services. They found that the most popular federal agencies were the U.S. Postal Service (90% favorable), the National Park Service (86%), NASA (81%), the CDC (80%), the FBI (70%), the Census Bureau (69%), the SSA (66%), the CIA, and the Federal Reserve (both 65%). There is very little to no partisan divide on the Postal Service, the National Park Service, NASA, the CIA, the Census Bureau.

According to a 2019 CBS News poll on 2,143 U.S. residents, 72% of Americans 18 to 44 years of age—Generations X, Y (millennials), and Z—believed that it is a matter of personal responsibility to tackle climate change while 61% of older Americans did the same. In addition, 42% of American adults under 45 years old thought that the U.S. could realistically transition to 100% renewable energy by 2050 while 29% deemed it unrealistic and 29% were unsure. Those numbers for older Americans are 34%, 40%, and 25%, respectively. Differences in opinion might be due to education as younger Americans are more likely to have been taught about climate change in schools than their elders. As of 2019, only 17% of electricity in the U.S. is generated from renewable energy, of which, 7% is from hydroelectric dams, 6% from wind turbines, and 1% solar panels. There are no rivers for new dams. Meanwhile, nuclear power plants generate about 20%, but their number is declining as they are being deactivated but not replaced.

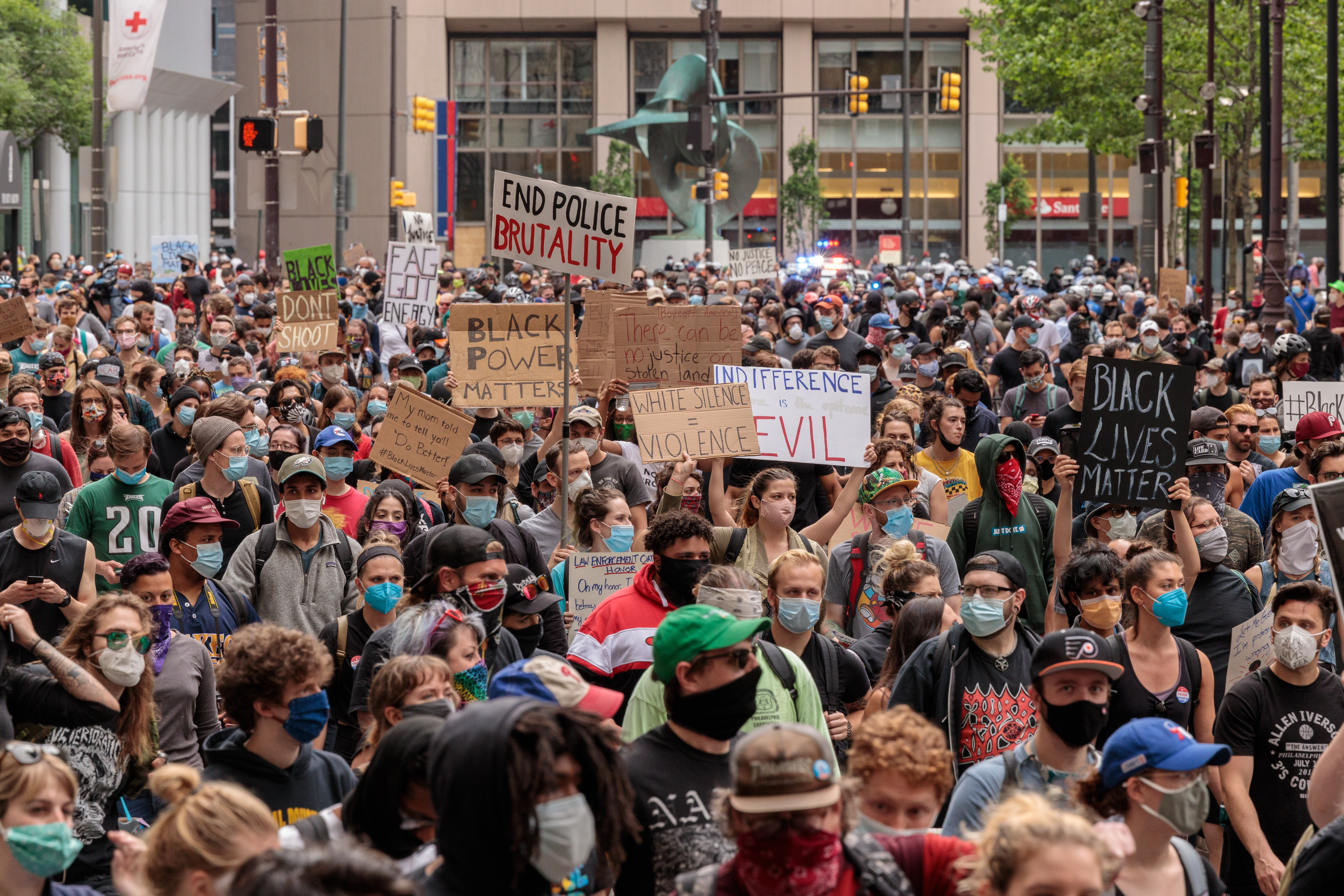
Masked Millennial protesters in Philadelphia during the George Floyd protests in June 2020

In early 2019, Harvard University's Institute of Politics Youth Poll asked voters aged 18 to 29—younger millennials and the first wave of Generation Z—what they would like to be priorities for U.S. foreign policy. They found that the top issues for these voters were countering terrorism and protecting human rights (both 39%), and protecting the environment (34%). Preventing nuclear proliferation and defending U.S. allies were not as important to young American voters. The Poll found that support for single-payer universal healthcare and free college dropped, down 8% to 47% and down 5% to 51%, respectively, if cost estimates were provided.

Millennials actively participated in the 2020-2021 George Floyd protests which were the largest series of protests against police brutality in the United States since the Civil Rights Movement.

=== Votes ===
Millennials are more willing to vote than previous generations when they were at the same age. With voter rates being just below 50% for the four presidential cycles before 2017, they have already surpassed members of Generation X of the same age who were at just 36%.

Pew Research described millennials as playing a significant role in the election of Barack Obama as President of the United States. Millennials were between 12 and 27 during the 2008 U.S. presidential election. That year, the number of voters aged 18 to 29 who chose the Democratic candidate was 66%, a record since 1980. The total share of voters who backed the President's party was 53%, another record. For comparison, only 31% of voters in that age group backed John McCain, who got only 46% of the votes. Among millennials, Obama received votes from 54% of whites, 95% of blacks, and 72% of Hispanics. There was no significant difference between those with college degrees and those without, but millennial women were more likely to vote for Obama than men (69% vs. 62%). Among voters between the ages of 18 and 29, 45% identified with the Democratic Party, while only 26% sided with the Republican Party, a gap of 19%. Back in 2000, the two main American political parties split the vote of this age group. This was a significant shift in the American political landscape. Millennials not only provided their votes but also the enthusiasm that marked the 2008 election. They volunteered in political campaigns and donated money. But that millennial enthusiasm all but vanished by the next election cycle while older voters showed more interest. In 2012, when Americans reelected Barack Obama, the voter participation gap between people above the age of 65 and those aged 18 to 24 was 31%. Pew polls conducted a year prior showed that while millennials preferred Barack Obama to Mitt Romney (61% to 37%), members of the Silent Generation leaned towards Romney rather than Obama (54% to 41%). But when looking at white millennials only, Pew found that Obama's advantage which he enjoyed in 2008 ceased to be, as they were split between the two candidates.

Although millennials are one of the largest voting blocs in the United States, their voting turnout rates have been subpar. Between the mid-2000s and the mid-2010s, millennial voting participation was consistently below those of their elders, fluctuating between 46% and 51%. For comparison, turnout rates for Generation X and the Baby Boomers rose during the same period, 60% to 69% and 41% to 63%, respectively, while those of the oldest of voters remained consistently at 69% or more. Millennials may still be a potent force at the ballot box, but it may be years before their participation rates reach their numerical potential as young people are consistently less likely to vote than their elders. In addition, despite the hype surrounding the political engagement and possible record turnout among young voters, millennials' voting power is even weaker than first appeared due to the comparatively higher number of them who are non-citizens (12%, as of 2019), according to William Frey of the Brookings Institution.

In general, the phenomenon of growing political distrust and de-alignment in the United States is similar to what has been happening in Europe since the last few decades of the twentieth century, even though events like the Watergate scandal or the threatened impeachment of President Bill Clinton are unique to the United States. Such an atmosphere depresses turnouts among younger voters. Among voters in the 18-to-24 age group, turnout dropped from 51% in 1964 to 38% in 2012. Although people between the ages of 25 and 44 were more likely to vote, their turnout rate followed a similarly declining trend during the same period. Political scientists Roger Eatwell and Matthew Goodwin argued that it was therefore unrealistic for Hillary Clinton to expect high turnout rates among millennials in 2016. This political environment also makes voters more likely to consider political outsiders such as Bernie Sanders and Donald Trump. The Brookings Institution predicted that after 2016, millennials could affect how politics is conducted in the two-party system of the United States, given that they were more likely to identify as liberals or conservatives than Democrats or Republicans, respectively. In particular, while Trump supporters were markedly enthusiastic about their chosen candidate, the number of young voters identifying with the GOP has not increased.

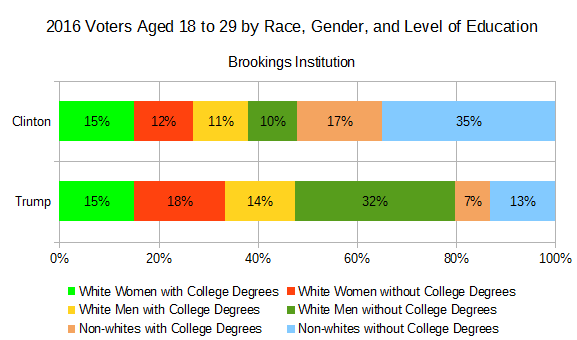

Bernie Sanders, a self-proclaimed democratic socialist and Democratic candidate in the 2016 United States presidential election, was the most popular candidate among millennial voters in the primary phase, having garnered more votes from people under 30 in 21 states than the major parties' candidates, Donald Trump and Hillary Clinton, did combined. According to the Brookings Institution, turnout among voters aged 18 to 29 in the 2016 election was 50%. Hillary Clinton won 55% of the votes from this age group while Donald Trump secured 37%. Polls conducted right before the election showed that millennial blacks and Hispanics were concerned about a potential Trump presidency. By contrast, Trump commanded support among young whites, especially men. There was also an enthusiasm gap for the two main candidates. While 32% of young Trump supporters felt excited about the possibility of him being President, only 18% of Clinton supporters said the same about her. The Bookings Institution found that among Trump voters in the 18-to-29 age group, 15% were white women with college degrees, 18% were the same without, 14% were white men with college degrees, and 32% were the same without, for a grand total of 79%. These groups were only 48% of Clinton voters of the same age range in total. On the other hand, a total of 52% of Clinton voters aged 18 to 29 were non-whites with college degrees (17%) and non-whites without them (35%). Clinton's chances of success were hampered by low turnouts among minorities and millennials with university degrees and students. Meanwhile, Trump voters included 41% of white millennials. These people tended to be non-degree holders with full-time jobs and were markedly less likely to be financially insecure than those who did not support Trump. Contrary to the claim that young Americans felt comfortable with the ongoing transformation of the ethnic composition of their country due to immigration, not all of them approve of this change despite the fact that they are an ethnically diverse cohort. In the end, Trump won more votes from whites between the ages of 18 and 29 than early polls suggested.

As is the case with many European countries, empirical evidence poses real challenges to the popular argument that the surge of nationalism and populism is an ephemeral phenomenon due to "angry white old men" who would inevitably be replaced by younger and more liberal voters. Especially since the 1970s, working-class voters, who had previously formed the backbone of support for the New Deal introduced by President Franklin D. Roosevelt, have been turning away from the left-leaning Democratic Party in favor of the right-leaning Republican Party. As the Democratic Party attempted to make itself friendlier towards the university-educated and women during the 1990s, more blue-collar workers and non-degree holders left. Political scientist Larry Bartels argued because about one quarter of Democrat supporters held social views more in-tune with Republican voters and because there was no guarantee millennials would maintain their current political attitudes due to life-cycle effects, this process of political re-alignment would likely continue. As is the case with Europe, there are potential pockets of support for national populism among younger generations.

A Reuters-Ipsos survey of 16,000 registered voters aged 18 to 34 conducted in the first three months of 2018 (and before the 2018 midterm election) showed that overall support for Democratic Party among such voters fell by nine percent between 2016 and 2018 and that an increasing number favored the Republican Party's approach to the economy. Pollsters found that white millennials, especially men, were driving this change. In 2016, 47% of young whites said they would vote for the Democratic Party, compared to 33% for the Republican Party, a gap of 14% in favor of the Democrats. But in 2018, that gap vanished, and the corresponding numbers were 39% for each party. For young white men the shift was even more dramatic. In 2016, 48% said they would vote for the Democratic Party and 36% for the Republican Party. But by 2018, those numbers were 37% and 46%, respectively. This is despite the fact that almost two thirds of young voters disapproved of the performance of Republican President Donald J. Trump. According to the Pew Research Center, only 27% of millennials approved of the Trump presidency while 65% disapproved that year.

== Canadian millennials ==
Historically, political participation among young Canadian voters has been low, no higher than 40%. However, the 2015 federal election was an exception, when 57% of the people aged 18 to 34 voted. Canadian millennials played a key role in the election of Justin Trudeau as Prime Minister of Canada. While Stephen Harper and the Conservative Party received approximately the same number of votes as they did in 2011, the surge in the youth vote was enough to push Trudeau to the top. His core campaign message centered around gender equality, tolerance, legalizing marijuana, addressing climate change, and governmental transparency while Harper focused on tax cuts. Nevertheless, political scientist Melanee Thomas at the University of Calgary warned that the electoral power of this demographic group should not be overestimated, since millennials do not vote as a single bloc. Even though millennials tend to vote for left-leaning candidates, certain items from right-leaning platforms can resonate with them, such as high but affordable standards of living.

A 2018 survey of 4,000 Canadian millennials by Abacus Data found that 54% of the people asked favored socialism and 46% capitalism. Most want to address climate change, alleviate poverty, and adopt a more open immigration policy, but most important were micro-economic concerns, such as housing affordability, the cost of living, healthcare, and job-market uncertainties. Housing affordability is a key political issue for young Canadians, regardless of where they live, urban, suburban, or rural Canada. Because clear majorities are in favor of government interventionism, they generally tolerate deficit spending.

According to Sean Simpsons of Ipsos, people are more likely to vote when they have more at stake, such as children to raise, homes to maintain, and income taxes to pay.

== British millennials ==
In their youth during the early 21st century, British millennials were generally considered a relatively politically disengaged generation. Turnout at United Kingdom general elections fell sharply after the millennium with involvement lowest among the young. A majority of 18 to 24 year olds failed to vote in the 2001, 2005 and 2010 general elections with participation reaching a record low among this age group of 38.2% in 2005. The British Social Attitudes Survey suggested that the proportion of people in their 20s and early 30s who identified with a particular political party fell from 85% in 1983 to 66% in 2012. Later, various political events such as the 2014 Scottish Independence referendum, 2016 European Union membership referendum and 2017 general election were seen as sparking the interest of the millennial cohort though turnout at elections has remained below mid-to-late 20th century levels.

The Economist reported in 2013 that surveys of political attitudes among millennials in the United Kingdom revealed that they held more liberal views on social and economic matters than older demographic groups. They favored individual liberty, small government, low taxes, limited welfare programs, and personal responsibility. While support for increased welfare programs for the poor at the cost of potentially higher taxes has declined steadily since the 1980s among all living demographic cohorts in the U.K., Generation Y disapproved of such spending schemes the most, according to data from Ipsos MORI and the British Social Attitudes Survey. On the other hand, they had a more relaxed attitude towards alcohol consumption, euthanasia, same-sex marriage and the legalization of drugs. They disliked immigration, though less than their elders. They were more likely than their elders to support public debt reduction. They cared about the environment, but not at the expense of economic prosperity, and they supported privatizing utilities. In other words, they were classical liberals or libertarians. Ipsos pollster Ben Page told The Economist, "Every successive generation is less collectivist than the last."

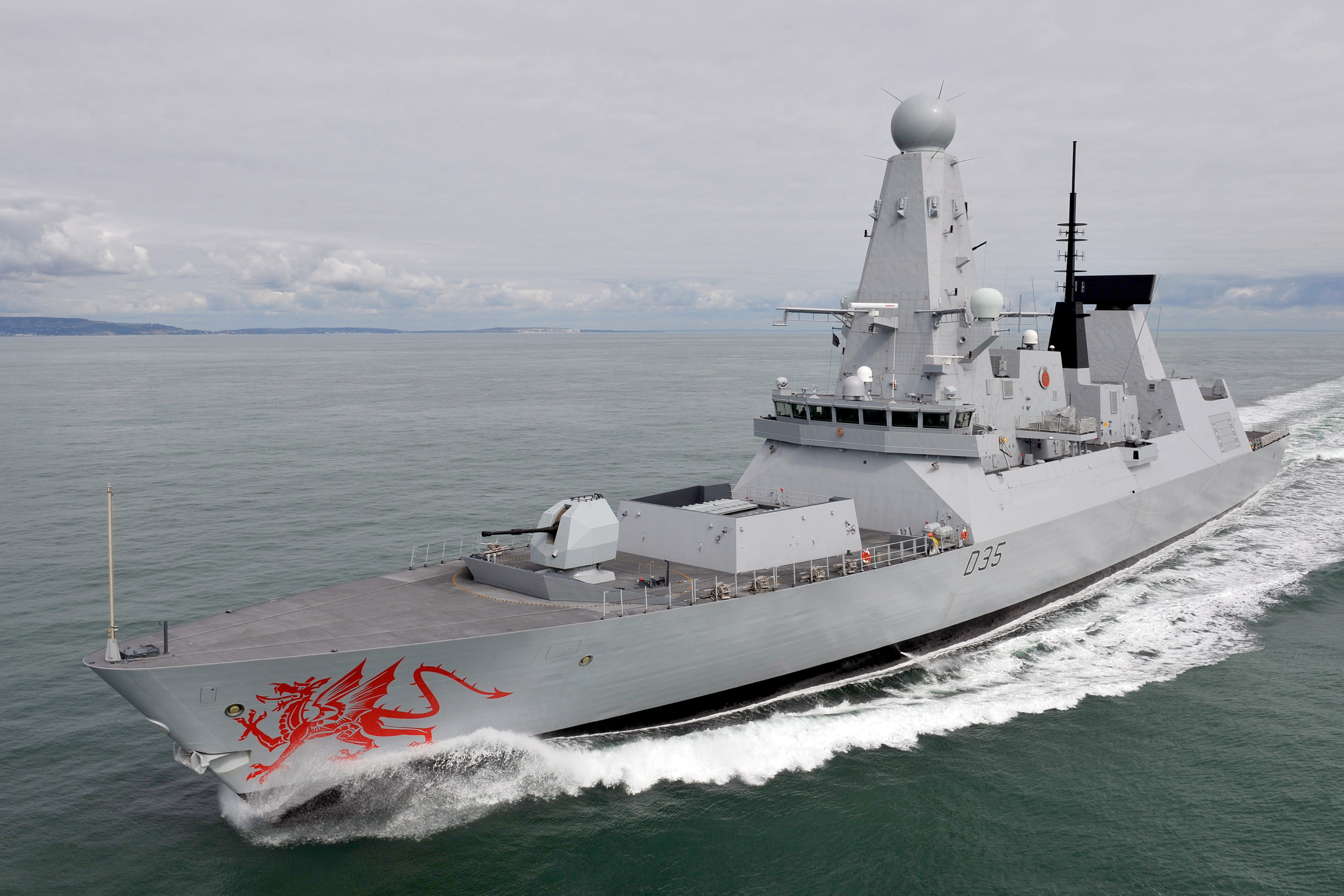
65% of British youths reported pride in the UK military. Pictured: Type 45 destroyer HMS Dragon in the English Channel (2011).

A 2013 YouGov poll of almost a thousand people aged 18 to 24 in the United Kingdom found that 73% in total supported the legalization of same-sex marriage and only 15% opposed. 41% either strongly or somewhat supported legalizing "soft" drugs, such as cannabis while 46% strongly or somewhat opposed. The five most popular political parties for young Britons were the Labour Party (23%), the Conservative Party (12%), the Liberal Democratic Party (7%), the Green Party (7%), and the United Kingdom Independence Party (6%). 19% of British youths identified with no party whatsoever. When asked which politician they admired, 77% picked the "none" option, followed by Boris Johnson (4%). 59% had signed a petition. 47% had voted in a local or national election, and 19% had contacted a politician representing them. Overall, 60% had an unfavorable view of the British political system. 12% thought British immigration laws were too tough, 54% said they were too lax, and 16% deemed them appropriate. About one third opined that taxes and public spending were too high. 22% said they were insufficient and one fifth thought they were about right. 34% believed welfare benefits were too generous and should be cut. 22% argued they were not enough and should be increased and 24% thought they struck the right balance. Almost three quarters agreed that the welfare system was frequently abused and 63% thought those who genuinely needed it were branded as "scroungers". A total of 40% were proud and 46% not proud of Britain's current welfare system. Some 39% thought that the current welfare system is financially untenable and needs to be slashed while 49% thought the status quo is fine. A total of 65% were either very or fairly proud of the United Kingdom Armed Forces, 62% the British Broadcasting Corporation (BBC), 77% the National Health Service (NHS). 57% thought that it would be possible to keep the NHS free at the point of service and 26% thought the NHS would eventually need to charge people in order to stay afloat.

According to a YouGov poll conducted right before the referendum on the possible departure of the United Kingdom from the European Union (Brexit) in 2016, almost three quarters of voters aged 18 to 24 opposed leaving the E.U. while just under one fifth supported leaving. 64% of Britons aged 25 to 29 and 61% between the ages of 30 and 35 supported remaining in the E.U. Meanwhile, 34% of pensioners wanted to remain and 59% wanted to leave. Older people were more likely to vote, and vote to leave. One of the reasons behind this generational gap is the fundamentally different environment that millennial voters grew up in. Many older voters came of age when Britain was a less ethnically diverse country, when collective memory of the British Empire and its victory in World War II was strong, when most people did not attend university, and spent a large part of their formative years in a society where abortion and homosexuality were illegal and the death penalty was in use. By contrast, millennials, many of whom supported the left-wing politician Jeremy Corbyn, grew up at a time when the United Kingdom was a member of the EU, when graduation from university was common, and when the political consensus favoured immigration and EU membership. But age is not the only reason, as voter data shows.

By analyzing polling data, the Wall Street Journal found that 19% of voters aged 18 to 24 either did not vote or were unsure, as did 17% of voters aged 25 to 49. Meanwhile, 10% of voters aged 50 to 64 and 6% of voters aged 65 and over abstained or were undecided. Overall, 52% (or 17.4 million) of British voters chose to leave and 48% (or 16.1 million) to remain in the E.U. Voter turnout was 72%, a sizeable figure, though not the largest on record after World War II, which was 84% in 1950. However, only 28.8 million people voted in 1950, compared to about 33.6 million in 2016. Still, it is the highest since 1992, as of 2019. That turnouts in millennial-majority constituencies were subpar while those in working-class neighborhoods were above average contributed to the outcome of the Brexit Referendum. Public opinion polls often underestimated the political power of working-class voters because these people are typically underrepresented in samples. Commonly made predictions of a victory for the Remain side created a sense of complacency among those who wanted the U.K. to remain in the European Union and a sense of urgency among those who wanted to leave.

While young people tend to view the European Union more favorably, it is erroneous to believe that they all oppose Brexit for all the same reasons. For example, someone from Northern Ireland is probably more concerned about the prospects of a physical border between that part of the U.K. and the Republic of Ireland than, say, losing the ability to study abroad in continental Europe under the E.U.-sponsored Erasmus Program. Nor is it accurate to say that the proponents of Brexit form a homogeneous group. Besides many wealthy retirees, immigrants, and children of immigrants, one third of university graduates voted to leave. As of 2017, about half of young British adults under 30 years of age have attended or are attending an institution of higher education, a number higher than previous generations.

A YouGov poll conducted in the spring of 2018 revealed that 58% of Britons between the ages of 25 and 49 thought that immigration to their country was "too high", compared to 41% of those aged 18 to 24.

Despite reports of a surge in turnouts among young voters in the 2015 and 2017 United Kingdom general elections, statistical scrutiny by the British Elections Study revealed that the margin of error was too large to determine whether or not there was a significant increase or decrease in the number of young participants. In both cases, turnouts among those aged 18 to 24 was between 40% and 50%. Winning the support of young people does not necessarily translate to increasing young voters' turnouts, and positive reactions on social media may not lead to success at the ballot box. Initial reports of a youth surge came from constituency-level survey data, which has a strong chance of over-representing voters rather than the Kingdom as a whole. In addition, higher turnouts generally came from constituencies where there were already large proportions of young people, both toddlers and young adults, and such surges did not necessarily come from young voters. In 2017, there was indeed an increase in overall voter turnout, but only by 2.5%. A consistent trend in the U.K. and many other countries is that older people are more likely to vote than their younger countrymen, and they tend to vote for more right-leaning (or conservative) candidates.

A 2021 report noted that the popular conception of British Millennials relationship with politics changed around the late 2010s from indifference to left-wing, socially liberal attitudes or "millennial socialism". The report which examined polling of millennials and adult Generation Z members political attitudes found clear negativity towards the idea of capitalism and positivity towards the idea of socialism in the abstract. There was also strong support for various socialist arguments though capitalist counter-arguments often also received plurality support. Commentators sometimes suggest that these attitudes are a natural aspect of youth which will pass as these people age though their some evidence against this. A analysis a British Election Study results for the 1964 to 2019 general elections found that whilst earlier age groups became more likely to vote Conservative as they got older millennials did not appear to be progressing in the same direction and an article on the analysis described them as "by far the least conservative 35-year-olds in recorded history." The 2021 report also commented on this argument that:

This [1981 to 1996 birth years] means that in 2021, there is no such thing as a '20-year-old Millennial' anymore. The oldest Millennials have already turned 40, and in that age group... support for socialist ideas remains alive and well. We therefore cannot dismiss these people's opinions with phrases like 'They are just going through a phase' or 'They will grow out of it', as if we were talking about a teenager in a Che Guevara-shirt. It is true that socialist ideas are most popular among the young, but that is 'the young' in the very broadest sense – 'the young' in the sense of 'people up to their early 40s', not 'the young' in the sense of 'recent school leavers'

== French millennials ==
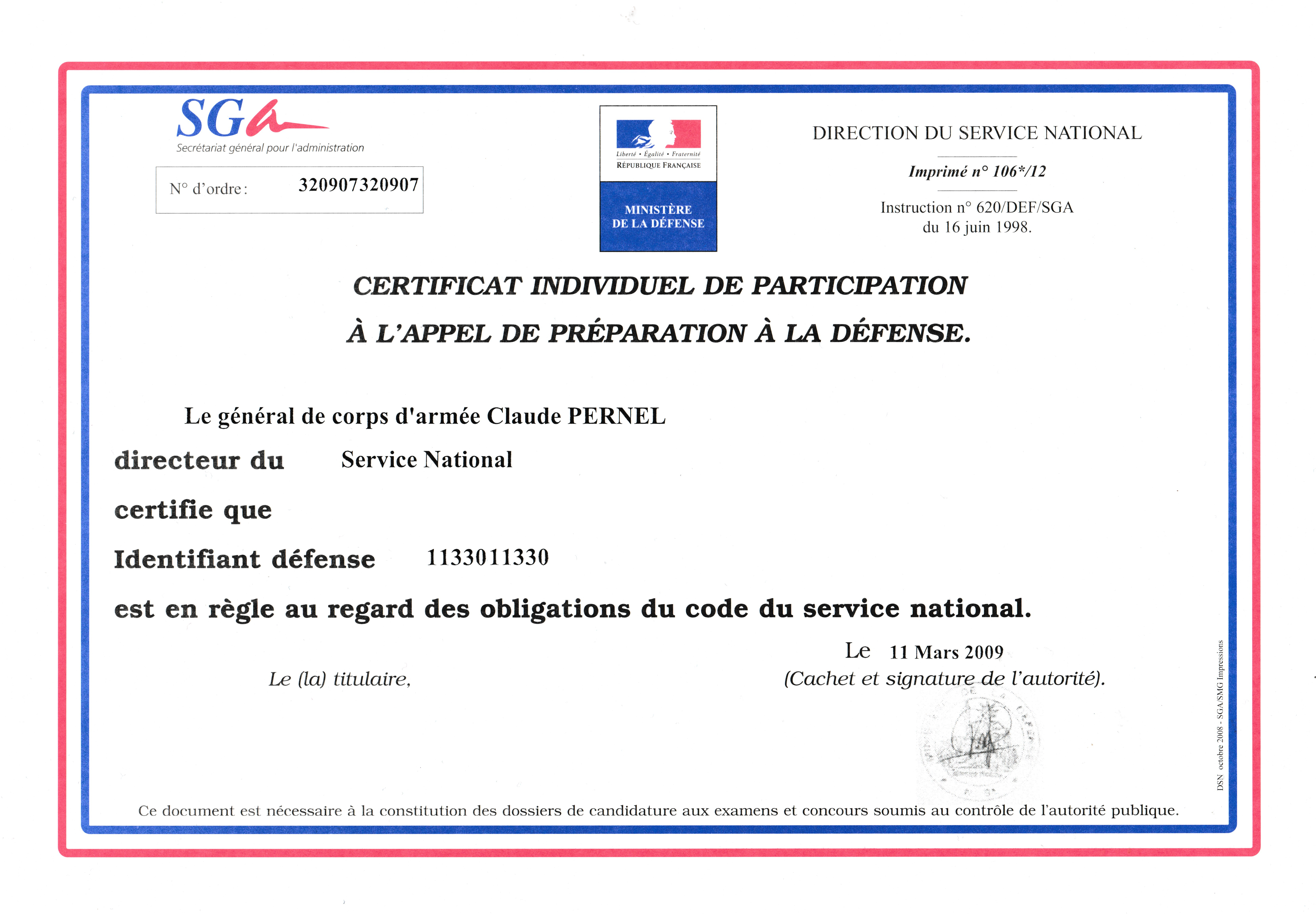
A sample JAPD certificate

In France, while year-long mandatory military service for men was abolished in 1996 by President Jacques Chirac, who wanted to build a professional all-volunteer military, all citizens between 17 and 25 years of age must still participate in the Defense and Citizenship Day (JAPD: Journée d'Appel de Préparation à la Défense, now Journée Défense et Citoyenneté), when they are introduced to the French Armed Forces, and take language tests. A 2015 IFOP poll revealed that 80% of the French people supported some kind of mandatory service, military, or civilian. The rationale for the reintroduction of national service was that "France needs powerful tools to help promote integration, mix young people of different social backgrounds and levels, and to instill Republican values and national cohesion". At the same time, returning to conscription was also popular; supporters included 90% of the UMP party, 89% of the National Front (now the National Rally), 71% of the Socialist Party, and 67% of people aged 18 to 24, even though they would be affected the most. This poll was conducted after the Charlie Hebdo terrorist attacks. In previous years, it averaged 60%.

== Other European millennials ==
The period between the middle to the late twentieth century could be described as an era of "mass politics", meaning people were generally loyal to a chosen political party. Political debates were mostly about economic questions, such as wealth redistribution, taxation, jobs, and the role of government. But as countries transitioned from having industrial economies to a post-industrial and globalized world, and as the twentieth century became the twenty-first, topics of political discourse changed to other questions and polarization due to competing values intensified. While this new period of political evolution was taking place, a new cohort of voters—millennials—entered the scene and these people tend to think differently about the old issues than their elders. Moreover, they are less inclined than previous generations to identify (strongly) with a particular political party.

But scholars such as Ronald Inglehart traced the roots of this new "culture conflict" all the way back to the 1960s, which witnessed the emergence of the Baby Boomers, who were generally university-educated middle-class voters. Whereas their predecessors in the twentieth century—the Lost Generation, the Greatest Generation, and the Silent Generation—had to endure severe poverty and world wars, focused on economic stability or simple survival, the Baby Boomers benefited from an economically secure, if not affluent, upbringing and as such tended to be drawn to "post-materialist" values. Major topics for political discussion at that time were things like the sexual revolution, civil rights, nuclear weaponry, ethnocultural diversity, environmental protection, European integration, and the concept of "global citizenship". Some mainstream parties, especially the social democrats, moved to the left in order to accommodate these voters. In the twenty-first century, supporters of post-materialism lined up behind causes such as LGBT rights, climate change, multiculturalism, and various political campaigns on social media. Inglehart called this the "Silent Revolution". But not everyone approved, giving rise to what Piero Ignazi called the "Silent Counter-Revolution".

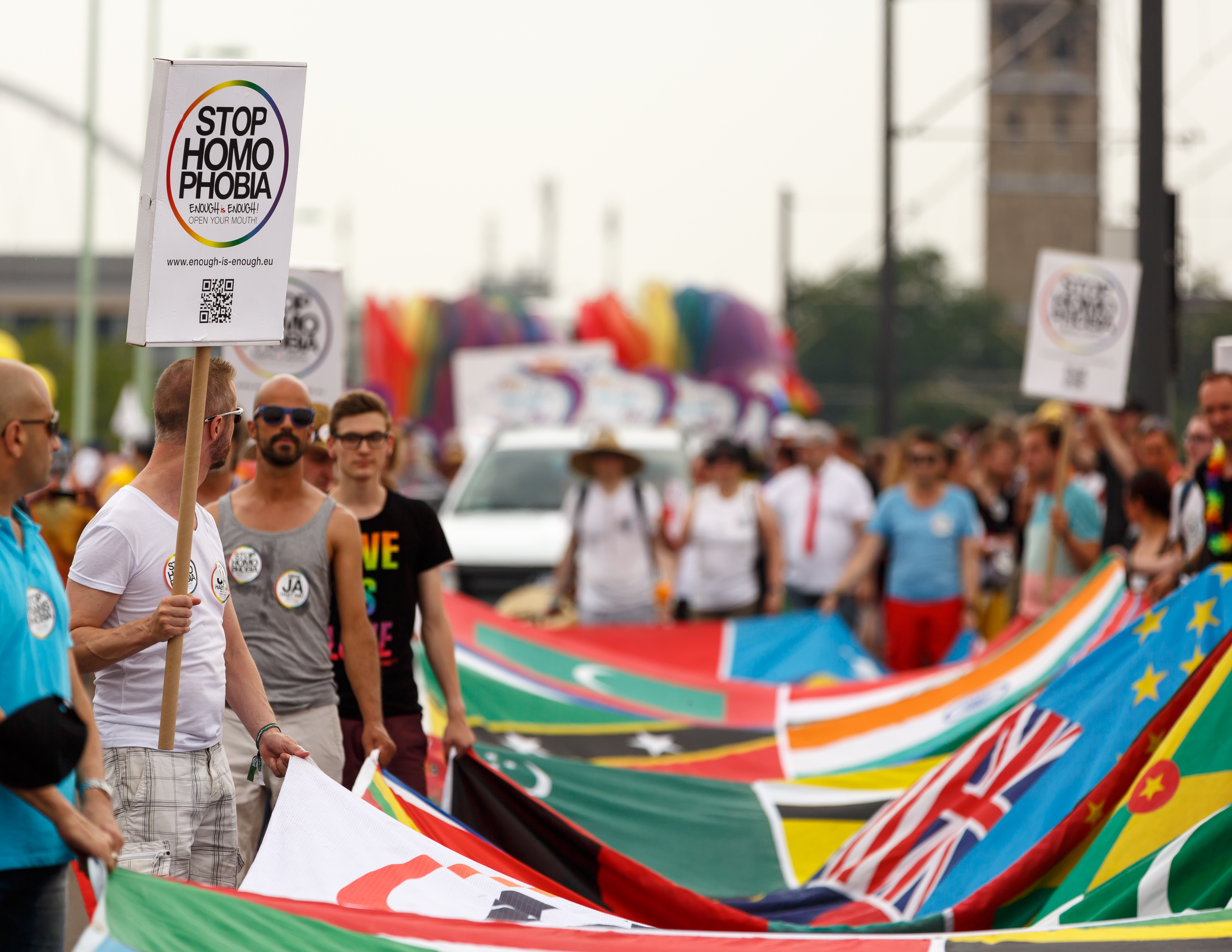
LGBT millennials at Cologne Pride (2015) carrying a banner with the flags of over 70 countries where homosexuality is illegal

The university-educated and non-degree holders have very different upbringing, live very different lives, and as such hold very different values. Education plays a role in this "culture conflict" as national populism appeals most strongly to those who finished high school but did not graduate from university while the experience of higher education has been shown to be linked to having a socially liberal mindset. Degree holders tend to favor tolerance, individual rights, and group identities whereas non-degree holders lean towards conformity, and maintaining order, customs, and traditions. While the number of university-educated Western voters continues to grow, in many democracies non-degree holders still form a large share of the electorate. According to the OECD, in 2016, the average share of voters between the ages of 25 and 64 without tertiary education in the European Union was 66% of the population. In Italy, it exceeded 80%. In many major democracies, such as France, although the representation of women and ethnic minorities in the corridors of power has increased, the same cannot be said for the working-class and non-degree holders.

By analyzing voter data, political scientists Roger Eatwell and Matthew Goodwin came to the conclusion that the popular narrative that the rise of national-populist movements seen across much of the Western world is due largely to angry old white men who would soon be replaced by younger and more liberal voters is flawed. In many European democracies, national-populist politicians and political parties tend to be the most popular among voters below the age of 40. In France, Marine Le Pen and her National Rally (formerly the National Front) won more votes from people between the ages of 18 and 35 during the first round of the 2017 presidential election than any other candidates. In Italy, Matteo Salvini and his League have a base of support with virtually no generational gap. In Austria, more than one in two men between the ages of 18 and 29 voted for the Freedom Party in 2016. The Alternative for Germany's strongest support came not from senior citizens but voters between 25 and 50 years of age. The Sweden Democrats were the second most popular political party for voters aged 18 to 24 and the most popular for those between 35 and 54 before the 2018 Swedish general election. According to SVT, 13% of those aged 18–21 voted for the Sweden Democrats in 2018 and 14% of those aged 22–30, making them the third largest party in both cases. That figure rose to 21% of 31-64 year-olds, making them second biggest in that age group.

== See also ==
- Political views of Generation Z
