= Samajwadi Janata Party (Rashtriya) =

- Abbreviation: SJP(R)
- President: Sanjay Singh Khutail
- Founder: Chandra Shekhar
- Founded: 5 November 1990 (35 years ago)
- Dissolved: 2020
- Split from: Janata Dal
- Headquarters: Narendra Niketan, Indraprastha Estate, New Delhi
- Youth wing: All India Socialist Youth Council
- Ideology: Socialism; Secularism
- Colours: Green
- ECI status: State Party
- Alliance: Third Front (1990–1991); Janata Parivar (2015—2017)

Election symbol
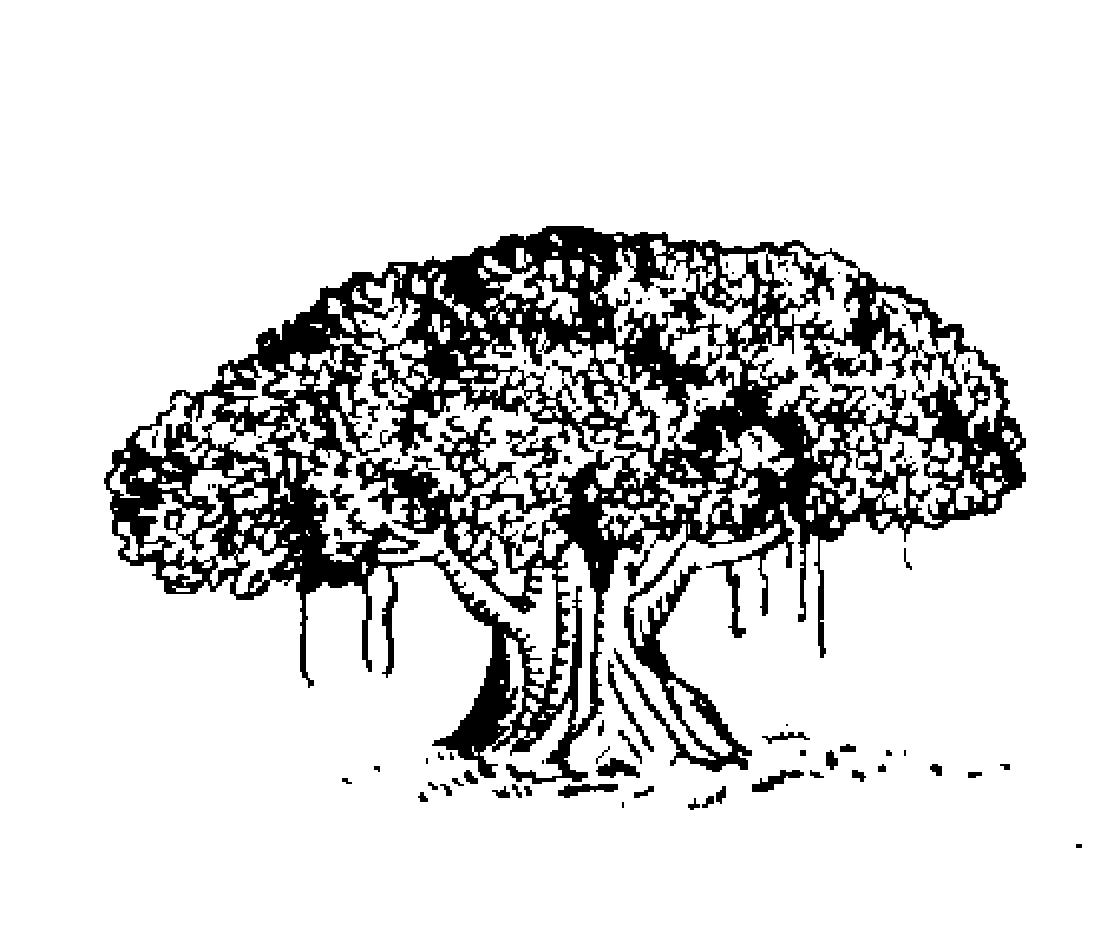

Samajwadi Janata Party (Rashtriya) (SJP(R)) was an Indian political party founded by Chandra Shekhar, who served as prime minister of the country from 1990 to 1991. He led the party until his death on 8 July 2007. At the time of his death, he was the party's sole member of the Lok Sabha.

The party was formed on 5 November 1990 when Shekhar and Devi Lal broke away from the governing Janata Dal. The party was able to gather 60 MPs and form a government, supported by the Indian National Congress (Indira) with Shekhar as prime minister. The SJP(R) government lasted for seven months, from 10 November 1990 to 21 June 1991. Shekhar's government collapsed when the INC(I) withdrew support.

S. R. Bommai was the president of Karnataka state unit till the state party got merged with Janata Dal in 1993 before 1994 Karnataka Assembly elections.

As of 2012 Kamal Morarka, a former cabinet minister in the union government headed by Chandra Shekhar, was the head of the party. The party headquarters were located in Narendra Niketan, ITO Indraprastha Estate, New Delhi, India.
