= Revolutionary Communist Party of Ivory Coast =

Political party in Ivory Coast

- Leader: Achy Ekissi
- Founded: 1990
- Newspaper: Révolution Prolétarienne
- Youth wing: Communist Youth of Côte d'Ivoire
- Ideology: Communism; Marxism–Leninism; Hoxhaism; Anti-revisionism
- International affiliation: ICMLPO

The Revolutionary Communist Party of Ivory Coast (French: Parti Communiste Révolutionnaire de Côte d'Ivoire, PCRCI) is a Marxist-Leninist and Hoxhaist party in Ivory Coast. It has been led by Achy Ekissi since 1990. Its youth wing is the Communist Youth of Ivory Coast. The party newspaper is the Révolution Prolétarienne.

Internationally, it participates in the International Conference of Marxist–Leninist Parties and Organizations, an international network of Communist parties that uphold the line of Enver Hoxha and the Albanian Party of Labour. As such, it is staunchly anti-revisionist.

The party claimed that the French troops acted as accomplices of the former President of Côte d'Ivoire Laurent Gbagbo during the 2004 French–Ivorian clashes.

== See also ==
- List of anti-revisionist groups

== Sources ==
- Sur la Reprise de la Guerre Civile en Cote D'ivoire et les Tueries Perpétrées par l'Armée Française Abidjan Addresse du PCRCI aux Partis et Organisations Communistes, 8 novembre 2004, (Address by Secretary General of the PCRCI, A. EKISSI) (in French)
- Rapport de la Commission d’enquête internationale sur les allégations de violations des droits de l’homme en Côte d’Ivoire (May 2004) on fr.wikisource
