= Communist Youth of Ivory Coast =

Political youth movement in Côte d'Ivoire

Communist Youth of Ivory Coast (Jeunesse Communiste de Côte d'Ivoire) is a political youth movement in Ivory Coast. JCOCI is the youth wing of the Revolutionary Communist Party of Côte d'Ivoire.

On 24 June 2004, the General Secretary of JCOCI, Habib Dodo, was murdered by Student Federation of Ivory Coast activists.
