= All India Socialist Youth Council =

Youth wing of the Samajwadi Janata Party

All India Socialist Youth Council is a political youth movement in India. It was the youth wing of Samajwadi Janata Party. The president of AISYC 1992–1996 was Bakta Charan Das.
