= Youth of the Progress Party =

Danish political organization

FPU logo

Youth of the Progress Party (Danish: Fremskridtspartiets Ungdom) is the youth wing of the Progress Party of Denmark.
