= British Election Study =

The British Election Study is an academic project to analyse the results of British elections that has examined every general election in the United Kingdom since 1964. The lead researchers are based at the University of Oxford and the University of Manchester.

The first study was conducted by David Butler and Donald E. Stokes. Since then the BES has provided data to help researchers understand changing patterns of party support and election outcomes. The British Election Study (BES) is one of the longest running election studies world-wide and the longest running social science survey in the UK.

== Methodology ==
Each wave of the study involves online surveys of around 30,000 people.
